= TRNSMT festival lineups =

TRNSMT is a large annual music festival that takes place in Glasgow Green in Glasgow, Scotland. The festival first took place in 2017. The following page is a list of acts that have performed at TRNSMT.

== 2017 ==
=== Main Stage ===
Friday 7 July	Saturday 8 July	Sunday 9 July
Radiohead	Kasabian	Biffy Clyro
Belle and Sebastian	Catfish and the Bottlemen	The 1975
London Grammar	George Ezra	Two Door Cinema Club
Rag'n'Bone Man	The Kooks	Twin Atlantic
Everything Everything	Stormzy	Blossoms
JP Cooper	Circa Waves	The View
	Cabbage	The Strypes

=== King Tuts Stage ===
Friday 7 July	Saturday 8 July	Sunday 9 July
Honne	The LaFontaines	Tom Grennan
Louis Berry	Sundara Karma	Clean Cut Kid
Saint Motel	Gerry Cinnamon	The Amazons
Be Charlotte	The Van T's	Declan McKenna
The Vegan Leather	Fickle Friends	Lewis Capaldi
Wuh Oh	Yonaka	Vukovi
	Vistas	JR Green
	The Vryll Society	

=== Jack Rocks Stage ===
Friday 7 July	Saturday 8 July	Sunday 9 July
Black Honey	The Wytches	Superfood
The Wholls	Neon Waltz	The Shimmer Band
The Sundowners	Medicine Men	RedFaces
The Phantoms	Vida	Tijuana Bibles
Sahara	Judas	The Blinders
Moonlight Zoo	Paves	White Room
Bang Bang Romeo	The Assist	Strange Bones
Carousel	Sugarmen	Anteros
	Heavy Rapids	Blackwaters
		Foggy City Orphan

== 2018 ==
=== Main Stage ===
Friday 29 June	Saturday 30 June	Sunday 1 July	Friday 6 July	Sunday 8 July
Stereophonics	Liam Gallagher	Arctic Monkeys	Queen + Adam Lambert	The Killers
The Script	Courteeners	Interpol	Texas	CHVRCHES
James Bay	Wolf Alice	Blossoms	Alabama 3	Franz Ferdinand
Kodaline	Gerry Cinnamon	Nothing But Thieves	The Darkness	Friendly Fires
Jessie J	Krept & Konan	Declan McKenna	The Temperance Movement	Jessie Ware
Picture This	Shed Seven	Miles Kane		Lewis Capaldi
	The LaFontaines	Tom Grennan		Hudson Taylor

=== King Tuts Stage ===
Friday 29 June	Saturday 30 June	Sunday 1 July	Friday 6 July	Sunday 8 July
Tom Walker	The Sherlocks	Sigrid	Gun	Nina Nesbitt
Pale Waves	IAMDDB	Fatherson	The Xcerts	Walking On Cars
Marmozets	Kyle Falconer	King No-One	Hunter & The Bear	Jane Weaver
Anteros	The Snuts	Dermot Kennedy	Mason Hill	Gang of Youths
Sam Fender	Bas	Confidence Man	Electric Pyramid	Juanita Stein
The Ninth Wave	Ramz	The Magic Gang	The Amorettes	
	The Academic	Island		
	The Night Café			

== 2019 ==
=== Main Stage ===
Friday 12 July	Saturday 13 July	Sunday 14 July
Stormzy	Catfish and the Bottlemen	George Ezra
Gerry Cinnamon	Bastille	Lewis Capaldi
Years & Years	Richard Ashcroft	Emeli Sandé
AJ Tracey	Sigrid	The Kooks
Fredo	DMA's	The Wombats
Amine	Sundara Karma	Tom Grennan
Mabel	The Snuts	The Amazons
Gus Dapperton	Sam Fender	

=== King Tut's Stage ===
Friday 12 July	Saturday 13 July	Sunday 14 July
Example	The Hunna	Circa Waves
Mist	Steve Mason	Mystery Jets
Mahalia	Jade Bird	SWMRS
Jimothy	Fontaines DC	Catherine McGrath
The Big Moon	Cavetown	Sea Girls
Cassia	The Dunts	Retro Video Club
Inhaler	Arkells	whenyoung
Kobi Onyame	Skinny Lister	

=== Queen Tut's Stage ===
Friday 12 July	Saturday 13 July	Sunday 14 July
Lauren Spiteri	Zoe Graham	The Eves
Lunir	Crystal	Zoee
Carly Connor	Sahara	Tamzene
Cara Rose	Tongue Trap	Stephanie Cheape
Chlobocop	Wet Look	Deni Smith
Scarlett Randle	Swim School	Baby Taylah

== 2020 ==
The 2020 festival was cancelled due to COVID-19, however the planned line up was as follows:

=== Main Stage ===
Friday 10 July	Saturday 11 July	Sunday 12 July
Courteeners	Liam Gallagher	Lewis Capaldi
Ian Brown	Foals	Snow Patrol
Sam Fender	Keane	Rita Ora
Blossoms	AJ Tracey	Amy Macdonald
Aitch	Twin Atlantic	Dermot Kennedy
Yung Bane	Picture This	Declan McKenna
House Gospel Choir	—N/a	Jay1
Sports Team	Vistas	Sea Girls

=== King Tut's Stage ===
Friday 10 July	Saturday 11 July	Sunday 12 July
Little Simz	Jimmy Eat World	Loyle Carter
Joy Crookes	Declan Welsh and The Deceased West	Josef
Beabadoobee	Dylan John Thomas	Ashe
The Regrettes	The Murder Capital	Ryan McCullum
Jeremy Loops	Georgia	Ms Banks
The Lathums	Mirra May	Kawalia
Red Rum Club	Psychedelics Porn Crumpets	Lyra
Shambolics	Mike McKenzie	Tamzene

=== River Stage ===
Friday 10 July	Saturday 11 July	Sunday 12 July
The Ninth Wave	Orla Gartland	Saint Phnx
Voodoos	Rascalton	Chloe Moriondo
Shaybo	Pip Blom	Aaron Smith
Gallus	The Hara	Charlotte
Another Sky	Vukovi	David Keenan
The Mysterines	Spyres	Luke La Volpe
One Nine	St Martiins	Sara 'N' Junbug.

TRNSMT announced their cancellation on 24 April 2020, a day after the First Minister of Scotland Nicola Sturgeon said public events were likely to be banned "for some time to come".

== 2021 ==
The 2021 festival was rescheduled to September instead of the usual slot July due to going COVID-19, many of the same lineup remained the same, however several acts (including Sunday night headliner Lewis Capaldi) pulled out:

=== Main Stage ===
Friday 10 September	Saturday 11 September	Sunday 12 September
Courteeners	Liam Gallagher	Chemical Brothers
Sam Fender	Primal Scream	Snow Patrol
Blossoms	Keane	Dermot Kennedy
Inhaler	Twin Atlantic	Amy Macdonald
AJ Tracey	KSI	Declan McKenna
Yxng Bane	Picture This	Jay1
House Gospel Choir	Vistas	Ella Eyre
Sports Team	Sea Girls	Lyra
—N/a	Nathan Evans	—N/a

=== King Tut's Stage ===
Friday 10 July	Saturday 11 July	Sunday 12 July
Little Simz	Becky Hill	Tom Odell
Joy Crookes	Declan Welsh and The Decadent West	Josef
Griff	Dylan John Thomas	Ash
The Lathums	The Murder Capital	Ryan McMullan
Holly Humberstone	Mirra May	Ms Banks
Berwyn	Retro Video Club	Kawalia
Red Rum Club	Voodoos	Kyle Falconer
Shambolics	Mike McKenzie	Tamzene

=== River Stage ===
Friday 10 September	Saturday 11 September	Sunday 12 September
The Ninth Wave	Lucia and the Best Boys	Saint Phnx
Walt Disco	Baby Queen	Rianne Downey
Vlure	Chubby and the Gang	Aaron Smith
Gallus	The Hara	Daytime TV
Another Sky	Spyres	Swim School
The Mysterines	Theo Bleak	Lucy Blue
One Nine	—N/a	Sara 'N' Junbug.

=== The Boogie Bar ===
Friday 10 September	Saturday 11 September	Sunday 12 September
Nightwave	We Should Hang Out More	Testpress
Dan South	Beth	Hayley Zalassi
Dija	Elisha	K4cie
Taahliah	Rebecca Vasmant	—N/a
Bruce Glenny	—N/a	Bruce Glenny

== 2022 ==
=== Main Stage ===
Friday 8 July	Saturday 9 July	Sunday 10 July
Paolo Nutini	The Strokes	Lewis Capaldi
Sam Fender	Foals	Wolf Alice
Chic and Nile Rogers	The Snuts	DMA's
Tom Grennan	Fontaines D.C.	Sigrid
The Lathums	Wet Leg	Mimi Webb
Ella Henderson	Example	Sigala
The Bootleg Beatles	Griff	Dylan John Thomas
—N/a	Dylan	Nina Nesbitt
—N/a	—N/a	—N/a

=== King Tut's Stage ===
Friday 8 July	Saturday 9 July	Sunday 10 July
Beabadoobee	Jimmy Eat World	Easy Life
M Huncho	Maxïmo Park	Gang of Youths
Saint Phnx	Self Esteem	Thomas Headon
The Regrettes	Wet Leg	Jamie Webster
Callum Beattie	Kenny Hoopla	Alfie Templeman
Luke La Volpe	Pip Millet	Mae Muller
Brooke Combe	Retro Video Club	Everyone You Know
Kitti	CVC	Crawlers

=== River Stage ===
Friday 8 July	Saturday 9 July	Sunday 10 July
The Skinner Brothers	Baby Strange	The Reytons
STONE	Pip Blom	Rianne Downey
Terra Kin	CMAT	Connor Fyfe
Finn Askew	Parliamo	Dylan Fraser
Dead Pony	George O'Hanlon	Luz
The Roly Mo	Medicine Cabinet	Bonnie Kemplay
Etta Marcus	Bemz	Alex Amor

=== The Boogie Bar ===
Friday 8 July	Saturday 9 July	Sunday 10 July
BETH	Hayley Zalassi	Hannah Laing
K4CIE	AISHA	Frankie Elyse
Nico Balducci	Elisha	Maria Airam
Dan South	Bruce Glenny	Bruce Glenny

== 2023 ==
=== Main Stage ===
Friday 7 July	Saturday 8 July	Sunday 9 July
Pulp	Sam Fender	The 1975
George Ezra	Kasabian	Royal Blood
Niall Horan	Aitch	Becky Hills
Paul Heaton	Mimi Webb	The Kooks
The View	Inhaler	Ashnikko
Joesef	Maisie Peters	Jamie Webster
Declan Welsh & The Decadent West	Brooke Combe	Pale Waves
Dead Pony	Swim School	Crawlers

=== King Tut's Stage ===
Friday 7 July	Saturday 8 July	Sunday 9 July
Cat Burns	LF System	Nothing But Thieves
Dean Lewis	The Wombats	The Enemy
WarmDuscher	Teddy Swims	The Amazons
The Big Moon	The Coronas	LoveJoy
Hot Milk	Lucy Spraggan	Bob Vylan
Hamish Hawk	The Mary Wallopers	Dream Wife
The Joy Hotel	Mae Stephens	Lucia & The Best Boys
Boyish	Cassia	Calum Bowie

=== River Stage ===
Friday 7 July	Saturday 8 July	Sunday 9 July
Nati Dreddd	The Blinders	Only The Poets
The Royston Club	Afflecks Palace	Skylights
Flowerovlove	Lauran Hibberd	Uninvited
Cloth	Finn Foxell	Tommy Lefroy
Sights	Heidi Curtis	Paris Paloma
High Vis	The Big Day	Nieve Ella
Slix	Terra Kin	Cathy Jain

=== The Boogie Bar ===
Friday 7 July	Saturday 8 July	Sunday 9 July
Dominique	Hayley Zalassi	T E S T P R E S S
Disco Tits	Arielle Free	Céleste
Eva	Nico Balducci	Polka Dot Disco Club
Bongo's Bingo	Bongo's Bingo	Bongo's Bingo
Dan South	Kooshty	C Frame

== 2024 ==
=== Main Stage ===
Friday 12 July	Saturday 13 July	Sunday 14 July
Liam Gallagher	Gerry Cinnamon	Calvin Harris
Garbage	Courteeners	Chase & Status
The Snuts	Rick Astley	Tom Grennan
Declan McKenna	Dylan John Thomas	Blossoms
Sugababes	Natasha Bedingfield	Alison Goldfrapp
Lauren Spencer Smith	The Vaccines	Baby Queen
Picture This	The Mary Wallopers	CMAT
Jalen Ngonda	NewDad	Rejjie Snow

=== King Tut's Stage ===
Friday 12 July	Saturday 13 July	Sunday 14 July
Example	Cian Ducrot	Enter Shikari
The Last Dinner Party	Vistas	The Reytons
Wunderhorse	Caity Baser	Nova Twins
Matt Maltese	Katie Gregson-MacLeod	Wasia Project
Nieve Ella	Seb Lowe	Rachel Chinouriri
Bella Mae	Dead Pony	Sprints
The Scratch	Royel Otis	Kingfishr
Siights	Psychedelic Porn Crumpets	Somebody's Child

=== River Stage ===
Friday 12 July	Saturday 13 July	Sunday 14 July
Cammy Barnes	Gallus	English Teacher
Pastel	Kerr Mercer	Bilk
Brògeal	Overpass	Daydreamers
Heartworms	Ili	Vida
Ben Walker	Plastiscines	Bby
Tallia Storm	Petch	Future Utopia
Fiona-Lee	The Bottle Rockets	Majesty Palm

== 2025 ==
=== Main Stage ===
Friday 11 July	Saturday 12 July	Sunday 13 July
50 Cent	Biffy Clyro	Snow Patrol
The Script	Fontaines D.C.	Gracie Abrams
Wet Leg	The Kooks	Jade Thirlwall
Schoolboy Q	Inhaler	Myles Smith
Jamie Webster	Sigrid	The Lathums
Twin Atlantic	Wunderhorse	Nathan Evans and Saint Phnx
James Bay	Alessi Rose	Tom Walker
Calum Bowie	Lucia & the Best Boys	Nieve Ella

=== King Tut's Stage ===
Friday 11 July	Saturday 12 July	Sunday 13 July
Confidence Man	Underworld	Shed Seven
Tanner Adell	Jake Bugg	Brooke Combe
The Royston Club	James Marriott	The K's
Good Neighbours	Biig Piig	Nina Nesbitt
Arthur Hill	Amble	Rianne Downey
NOFUN!	Brògeal	Kyle Falconer
Remember Monday	HotWax	Kerr Mercer
	Chloe Qisha	Nxdia

== 2026 ==
=== Main Stage ===
Friday 19 June	Saturday 20 June	Sunday 21 June
Richard Ashcroft	Kasabian	Lewis Capaldi
Wolf Alice	Sonny Fodera	Amy Macdonald
Dylan John Thomas	The Snuts	CMAT
Nile Rodgers & Chic	The Last Dinner Party	Two Door Cinema Club
The K's	The Fratellis	Perrie Edwards
Beluga Lagoon	English Teacher	Jacob Alon
Cammy Barnes	Brogeal	Katie Gregson-MacLeod
	Rianne Downey	Kerr Mercer

=== King Tut's Stage ===
Friday 19 June	Saturday 20 June	Sunday 21 June
The Beta Band	Loyle Carner	Skye Newman
Becky Hill	Clementine Douglas	Caity Baser
NewDad	Rose Gray	Red Rum Club
South Arcade	Keo	Overpass
Luvcat	Madra Salach	Westside Cowboy
Songer	Big Special	Billy Reekie
Cliffords	The Rooks	Finn Forster
	Chasing Abbey	Vida
