= Junior (LaFontaines album) =

Studio album by The LaFontaines
- Released: 14 June 2019
- Recorded: 2018–2019
- Genres: Rock; indie; hip hop
- Length: 28:51
- Label: SO Recordings
- Producers: Kerr Okan; Jamie Keenan; Darren McCaughey; Thomas McNeice

Singles from Junior
- 1. "Up" Released: 15 June 2018; 2. "All In" Released: 12 March 2019; 3. "Alpha" Released: 21 May 2019; 4. "Body" Released: 11 June 2019

Junior is the third studio album by Scottish hip hop and rock band The LaFontaines. It was released on 14 June 2019 by SO Recordings.

== Release ==
The band released single "Up" in the summer of 2018 before playing the opening set on the main stage at day two of TRNSMT festival. The song was played on Annie Mac's BBC Radio 1 show on 18 July 2018.

The second official single from Junior was "All In" which dropped on 12 March 2019 and debuted the band's new line up with Jamie Keenan taking lead vocals for the songs' choruses. The song was released via SO Recordings also marking the band's first release through the independent label.

The third single from the album was "Alpha" which released to all platforms on 21 May 2019. The song quickly became of the band's most popular songs on streaming service Spotify gaining half a million streams in the first month of its release.

The album was released on 14 June 2019.

== Critical reception ==
Professional ratings
Review scores
Source	Rating
Dead Press	8/10 stars
The Skinny	4/5 stars
Rock and Load Mag	9/10

Junior was met with acclaim from critics, receiving praise for its more mature sound and special praise in particular for the records production. At aggregating website Album of The Year, the album has received a normalized rating of 80, based on 2 critical reviews, indicating "generally favorable reviews". Dylan Tuck from The Skinny awarded Junior 4 stars noting the band sound "... more charged than ever" declaring that Junior "ticks all the boxes"

== Track listing ==
All lyrics are written by Kerr Okan, Jamie Keenan, Darren McCaughey; all music is composed by Kerr Okan, Jamie Keenan, Darren McCaughey.

Junior
No.	Title	Length
1.	"All In"	3:36
2.	"Alpha"	3:36
3.	"Anything At All"	3:23
4.	"Switch Out the Light"	3:49
5.	"Pro"	4:19
6.	"Up"	3:46
7.	"Tomorrow Won't Worry Me"	3:36
8.	"Body"	4:06
