= Little House (EP) =

EP by Rachel Chinouriri
- Released: 4 April 2025
- Length: 13:01
- Label: Parlophone
- Producers: Apob; Chloe Kraemer

Rachel Chinouriri chronology
What a Devastating Turn of Events (2024)	Little House (2025)	I Think I Spoke Too Soon (2026)

Singles from Little House
- 1. "Can We Talk About Isaac?" Released: 5 March 2025; 2. "What A Life" Released: 12 September 2025

Little House is the fourth extended play (EP) by the English singer-songwriter Rachel Chinouriri, released on 4 April 2025 through Parlophone. Consisting of four tracks and a duration of around thirteen minutes, it was entirely produced by Apob, who was accompanied by Chloe Kraemer on one track. The EP was co-written by Chinouriri after the release of her debut album, What a Devastating Turn of Events (2024), and centres on a romantic relationship with lighter sounds and themes than its predecessor. For its concept and title, Chinouriri drew inspiration from her own childhood dream of having a little house with a future partner.

The single "Can We Talk About Isaac?" preceded Little House on 5 March 2025, the same day the EP was announced. Upon its release, the project was met with a positive reception from music critics, some of whom praised Chinouriri's songwriting and performance. Reviewers also thought that it worked positively as a preview of the artist's possible second studio album.

== Background and release ==
Rachel Chinouriri released her debut studio album, What a Devastating Turn of Events (2024), to critical acclaim. At the red carpet of the Brit Awards 2025, Chinouriri stated to Clash that she was working on new music. On 5 March 2025, Chinouriri released the single "Can We Talk About Isaac?" and announced the then-upcoming extended play (EP) Little House. Weeks later, the artist began to serve as an opening act for Sabrina Carpenter's Short n' Sweet Tour across Europe. The EP was released on 4 April 2025 through Parlophone. Chinouriri's first North American headlining concert tour began in May 2025, coinciding with the first anniversary of What a Devastating Turn of Events.

An expanded edition of the EP, with bonus track "What a Life", was released on 12 September 2025. A second reissue of the EP was released on 28 November 2025, with a sixth track and title track "Little House".

== Composition ==
The lyrical content of Little House contrast with What a Devastating Turn of Events, which featured heavy and dark themes of personal struggles and trauma. The EP's title and concept were inspired by Chinouriri's dream of having a little house with a partner in the future, which she wanted since she was a child. It was made after the release of the album, in a process where the artist went to psychotherapy and started a romantic relationship. She wanted to expand the emotions in her music catalog as she struggled to write about positive experiences.

The EP opens with "Can We Talk About Isaac?", an upbeat indie pop and alternative pop song described as "typically crowd-pleasing" by George Griffiths from the Official Charts Company. Driven by guitars, the song was compared by Felicity Newton of Dork to the soundtrack album for Angus, Thongs and Perfect Snogging (2008). Lyrically, it is about Chinouriri's relationship with her partner, and describes how it is beneficial to her life. The second track, "23:42", is an alternative rock track with an upbeat production and features an airy vocal performance from Chinouriri. Margaret Farrell from Stereogum wrote that it "sounds a bit like Gorillaz". The EP's closer tracks are stripped-back ballads. "Judas" changes the tone of the previous tracks and contains a mention of death; Newton said that it has a similar approach to What a Devastating Turn of Events. According to Rhian Daly of NME, the song also suggests that Chinouriri was betrayed by a person and she later forgave them. The lyrics of "Indigo" are intimate and find Chinouriri trying to be optimistic in vulnerable moments. Sonically, it grows to a crescendo with backing vocals and electronic beats.

== Critical reception ==
Professional ratings
Review scores
Source	Rating
DIY	4/5 stars
Dork	4/5
NME	4/5 stars
Pitchfork	7.2/10

Music critics believed that Little House positively worked as a preview of what Chinouriri's second album would sound like. Robin Murray from Clash praised the EP's songwriting, which the critic described as Chinouriri's "most impactful and uplifting songwriting yet". Similarly, Newton said that the artist showcased her writing versatility and "emotional authenticity", but wrote that "the tonal shift midway through might give some listeners whiplash". Daly believed Little House proves Chinouriri's artistry regardless of the lyrical themes, and Kayla Sandiford from DIY thought that it captured her musical growth and consolidated her status as one of the most interesting indie pop artists. Rolling Stone UK named the EP one of the best music projects from its release week, and wrote that it is "a strong appetite-whetter" between Chinouriri's albums.

== Track listing ==
Little House track listing
No.	Title	Writer(s)	Producer(s)	Length
1.	"Can We Talk About Isaac?"	Rachel Chinouriri; Ines Dunn; Chloe Kraemer; Daniel Hylton-Nuamah	Kraemer; Apob	4:03
2.	"23:42"	Chinouriri; Aaron Paul O'Brien; Glen Roberts	Apob	3:01
3.	"Judas" (Demo)	Chinouriri; O'Brien; May Weitz	Apob	2:54
4.	"Indigo"	Chinouriri; Roberts; Rich Turvey	Apob	3:01
Total length:				13:01

Reissue tracks
No.	Title	Writer(s)	Producer(s)	Length
5.	"What A Life"	Chinouriri; O'Brien; Ruby Drew Coplestone; Rhys Lewis	Apob	4:06
6.	"Little House"	Chinouriri; O'Brien; Roberts; Coplestone; Lewis	Apob	2:30
Total length:				19:37

== Personnel ==
Credits were adapted from Tidal.

- Rachel Chinouriri – vocals
- Aaron Paul O'Brien – bass, synthesizer (tracks 1, 2, 4); acoustic guitar (1, 3, 4), electric guitar (1, 2), drums (2, 4)
- Daniel Hylton-Nuamah – bass, electric guitar, synthesizer (track 1)
- Ross Higginson – drums (track 1)
- Glen Roberts – shaker, synthesizer, tambourine (track 2)
- Tyler Nuffer – pedal steel guitar (track 3)
- Matt Colton – mastering (track 1)
- Stan Kybert – mastering (tracks 2–4)
- Charlie Holmes – mixing
- Kyle Parker Smith – engineering (track 3)
