= What a Devastating Turn of Events =

Studio album by Rachel Chinouriri
- Released: 3 May 2024
- Genre: Indie rock
- Length: 49:23
- Label: Parlophone
- Producers: Rich Turvey; APOB; Aaron Shadrow; Oli Bayston; HYLNU; Leroy Clampitt; Kenny Beats; TommyD; Josh Scarbrow; Jonah Summerfield

Rachel Chinouriri chronology
Better Off Without (2022)	What a Devastating Turn of Events (2024)	Little House (2025)

Singles from What a Devastating Turn of Events
- 1. "The Hills" Released: 12 October 2023; 2. "Never Need Me" Released: 18 January 2024; 3. "What a Devastating Turn of Events" Released: 28 February 2024; 4. "It Is What It Is" Released: 19 April 2024

What a Devastating Turn of Events is the debut studio album by English singer-songwriter Rachel Chinouriri. It was released on 3 May 2024 through Parlophone, with distribution from Atlas Artists. The album was written between 2022 and 2023, after Chinouriri had decided to shelve a previous full-length project in order to work on new material; it was supported by four singles: "The Hills", "Never Need Me", "What a Devastating Turn of Events" and "It Is What It Is".

Chinouriri mainly defined What a Devastating Turn of Events as an indie rock album, and said that it was thematically split in two sections on purpose, with the former leg including mostly lighter tracks, and the latter being made of songs that tackle heavier and darker topics. Upon its release, it received universal acclaim from critics and peaked at No. 17 on the UK Albums Chart.

== Background and recording ==
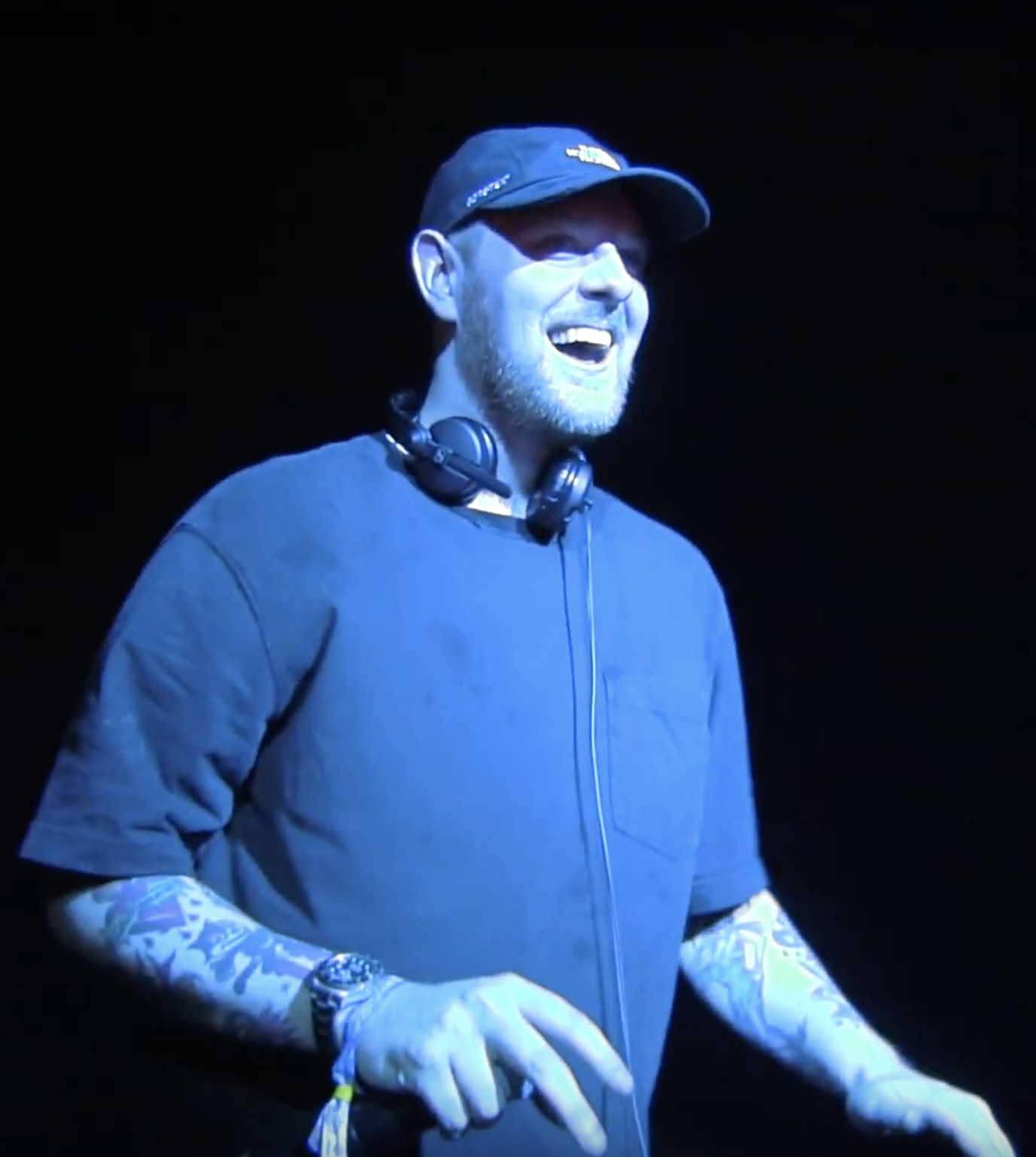
Kenny Beats was one of the producers who contributed to the creation of What a Devastating Turn of Events.

Chinouriri began working on her debut album in 2022, shortly after the release of her mini-album, Four° In Winter. In between the studio sessions, she went on tour both as a headliner, in the UK and the US, and as a supporting act for Lewis Capaldi (during his Broken by Desire to Be Heavenly Sent Tour) and Louis Tomlinson (during the European leg of his Faith in the Future World Tour).

Collaborators for the album include the likes of Rich Turvey, Kenny Beats, Aaron Shadrow and Glen Roberts. Chinouriri started writing and recording songs in England, specifically between Forestdale, London and Hereford, until early 2023, when she travelled to the United States and stayed in Los Angeles for over a month, (Note: The cited NME article reports that Chinouriri's stay in Los Angeles lasted five "fortnights".) in order to avoid multiple plane trips due to her fear of flying. However, she struggled to settle in the American city and connect creatively with other artists, aspects that had a negative impact on her mental health and the quality of her work. As a result, she decided to move back to London to complete the record.

The artist told Spin that she was actually planning to release a different album as her debut project back in 2020, but eventually decided to shelve it, in order to work on new material that would be featured both on Four° In Winter and What a Devastating Turn of Events:

I don't think I would have been happy for my other album to be [my] first album. [...] I sound really young and not confident in those songs. And I think I'm really confident in who I am now as an artist. [...] I don't want to say that this album is "woe is me", but this is the trauma-dump kind of vibe. The place I've been in mentally now is way different and a better place. The music I have should represent that place, essentially.

== Music and lyrics ==
Chinouriri mainly defined What a Devastating Turn of Events as an indie rock album. She stated that she wanted to recreate the visual and sonic aesthetics of the Britpop movement in the 1990s and 2000s, while reclaiming her position in the indie scene, where Black female artists were still underrepresented. She cited artists such as Oasis, The Libertines, Coldplay, Lily Allen, Noisettes and V V Brown as some of the sources of inspiration for the style she had adopted while writing the album.

The album is thematically split in two sections, with the former leg including mostly lighter tracks, and the latter being made of songs that tackle heavier and darker topics. Chinouriri told DIY the choice was intentional, saying:

[The tracklist is meant to] replicate what I felt when I was growing up as a kid. Life could be super normal, but you're always anticipating something major to happen, [...] whether it was traumatic, whether it was a fight, whether it was an argument [or, as] I was raised in an all-white neighbourhood, whether it was a racism thing. I was always looking over my shoulder, anticipating something could happen, but it would always happen when I least expected it. [I wanted the album to convey] this false sense of security, [as you pass through the lighter first half,] then suddenly... boom! You've been hit with a very deep and dark song, and then everything changes...

The record's themes refer to the artist's feelings of frustration towards her first experience in Los Angeles ("The Hills"); her past love relationships ("Never Need Me" and "Dumb Bitch Juice"); the loss of a relative in Zimbabwe who died by suicide after finding out she was pregnant (the title track); struggles with body dysmorphia ("I Hate Myself"); the highs and lows of her family upbringing ("Garden of Eden").

== Release and promotion ==
=== Marketing and singles ===
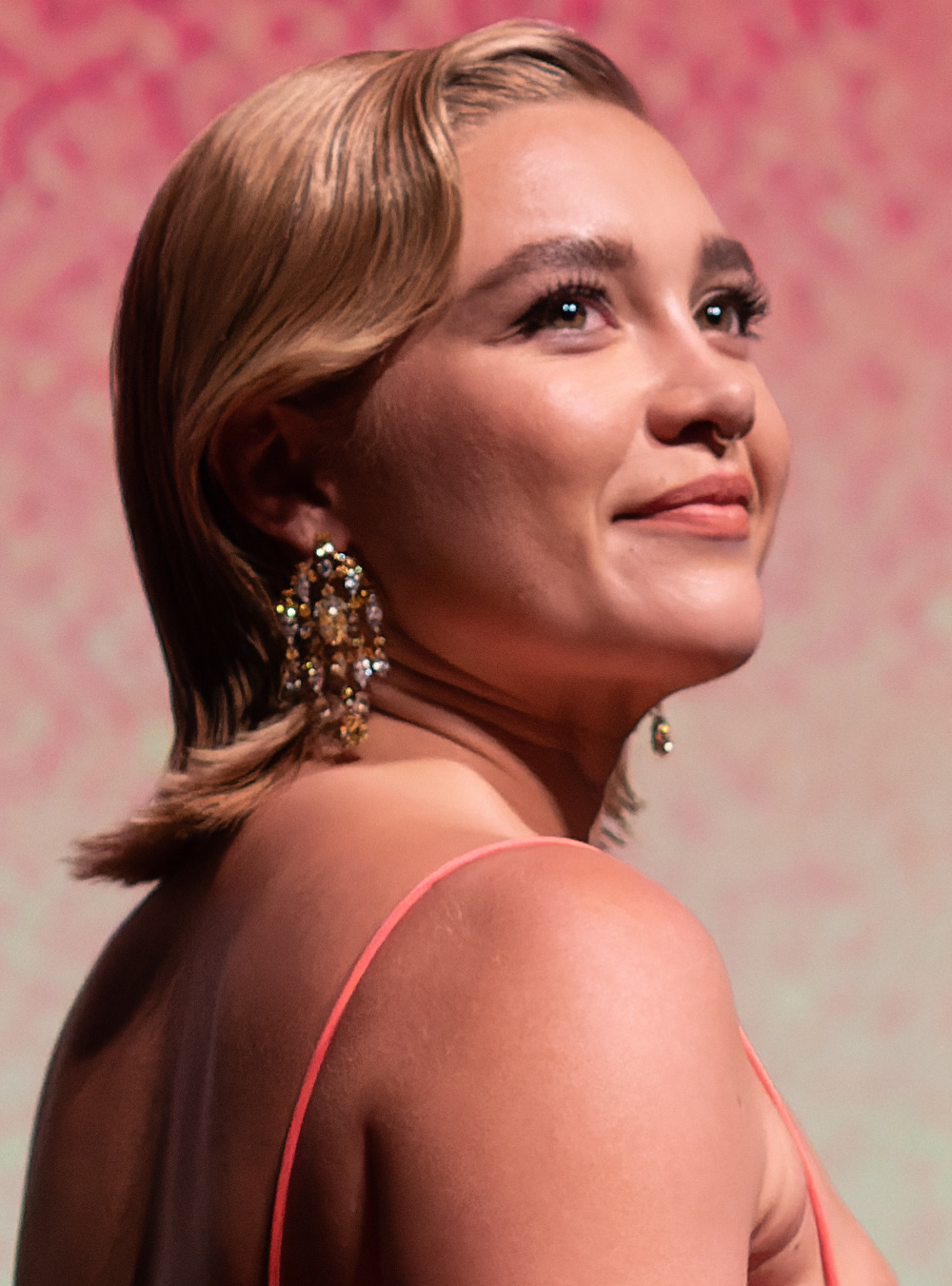
Florence Pugh starred together with Chinouriri in the official music video for the single "Never Need Me".

The lead single from the album, "The Hills", was released on 12 October 2023, along with its accompanying music video. On 15 January 2024, Chinouriri revealed the album's title during a cover interview with NME; she then shared the tracklist and artwork of What a Devastating Turn of Events three days later, when she also released the second single, "Never Need Me", accompanied by a music video starring the artist herself and Florence Pugh. The album's title track was released as the third single on 28 February of the same year, whereas its accompanying music video was shared on 18 March. The fourth and final promotional single from the album, "It Is What It Is", was released on 19 April, along with a visualizer.

The album also contained two previous singles by Chinouriri: an acoustic version of her 2018 single, "So My Darling" – originally released in January 2022, following the rise in popularity of the original song on TikTok – and "All I Ever Asked", released in March 2022 and initially included in her EP from the same year, Better Off Without, before being shared by Sophie Turner in her Instagram Stories and subsequently going viral in December 2023.

In the build-up to the album's release, Chinouriri played a series of in-store shows across the UK in February 2024, before performing three more gigs the following month, respectively, at the KOKO in London, in Brooklyn and at The Echo in Los Angeles.

=== Artwork ===
The album's artwork was revealed upon its announcement on 18 January 2024. Shot by Yana Van Nuffel, it depicts Chinouriri in multiple poses both inside and in front of a council estate festooned with St George's Cross bunting, as a reference to the flag of England. The artist told The Guardian that she decided to include the English flag in the cover art as a celebration of her Black British identity in spite of the racist abuse she had faced growing up.

The cover art's purpose was subject of controversy, with Black studies professor Kehinde Andrews telling the BBC's Newsbeat that he would "question why anybody [would] want to reclaim something which is so connected to whiteness", in reference to systemic racism in the UK and the cultural appropriation of the English flag by the nationalist far-right. While acknowledging the criticism, Chinouriri stated that "if art kind of makes you turn your head a little bit, it's doing the right thing".

== Critical reception ==
Professional ratings
Aggregate scores
Source	Rating
AnyDecentMusic?	7.7/10
Metacritic	83/100
Review scores
Source	Rating
Clash	8/10
DIY	4.5/5 stars
NME	4/5 stars
Pitchfork	7.5/10
The Daily Telegraph	4/5 stars
The Line of Best Fit	8/10
The Needle Drop	7/10
The Observer	4/5 stars
The Skinny	4/5 stars

According to the review aggregator Metacritic, What a Devastating Turn of Events received "universal acclaim" based on a weighted average score of 83 out of 100 from eight critic scores.

Writing for Clash, Robin Murray said the record was "littered with ideas, but also one that thrives on being succinct", noting how the title track was the only song on it to go over the four-minute mark, and praised Chinouriri's creativity and versatility. Lauren Shirreff of The Daily Telegraph wrote that the project showed "the true scope" of the artist's musical influences including Ladysmith Black Mambazo, Coldplay, Lily Allen and Daughter, while also focusing on Chinouriri's decision to split the record in half thematically. Noah Barker of The Skinny highlighted the artist's progress from her previous EPs.

Writing for The Line of Best Fit, Sam Franzini gave positive feedback about the songwriting across the album, saying it "[charted] the highs and lows of life like a pro, finding humour in its dark moments and grace in its upswings". Damien Morris of The Observer similarly praised Chinouriri's songwriting, as well as her vocal delivery, whereas Daisy Carter of DIY showed appreciation for the album's thematic diversity. Sophie Williams of NME also emphasized the emotional impact provided by the album as a whole; for the exact same reason, however, she noted how the inclusion of an acoustic version of the 2018 song "So My Darling" as the closer track created a "noticeably stark" gap with many other songs on the record.

=== Year-end lists ===
Select year-end rankings for What a Devastating Turn of Events
Publication/critic	Accolade	Rank	Ref.
Paste	The 100 Best Albums of 2024	84	
Time Out	The Best Albums of 2024	17	

== Track listing ==
What a Devastating Turn of Events track listing
No.	Title	Writer(s)	Producer(s)	Length
1.	"Garden of Eden"	Rachel Chinouriri; Mary Weitz; Aaron Paul O'Brien; Glen Roberts	Rich Turvey; APOB	3:55
2.	"The Hills"	Chinouriri; Weitz; Aaron Shadrow	Shadrow; Turvey	3:31
3.	"Never Need Me"	Chinouriri; Turvey; Roberts; Oli Bayston; Jonny Coffer	Rich Turvey	3:25
4.	"My Everything"	Chinouriri; O'Brien	APOB; Turvey^{[a]}	3:32
5.	"All I Ever Asked"	Chinouriri; Roberts; Jamie Lloyd Taylor	HYLNU; Bayston	3:37
6.	"It Is What It Is"	Chinouriri; Leroy Clampitt	Clampitt; Turvey	2:59
7.	"Dumb Bitch Juice"	Chinouriri; Kenneth Blume; Sarah Aarons	Turvey	3:31
8.	"What a Devastating Turn of Events"	Chinouriri; Roberts; Daniel Hylton-Nuamah	HYLNU	4:19
9.	"My Blood"	Chinouriri; Weitz; Roberts; O'Brien	Turvey; APOB; Tommy D^{[a]}	3:37
10.	"Robbed"	Chinouriri; Jonny Lattimer; Josh Scarbrow	Turvey; Scarbrow	3:44
11.	"Cold Call"	Chinouriri; Jonah Summerfield	Turvey; Summerfield	2:58
12.	"I Hate Myself"	Chinouriri; Summerfield	Summerfield; Turvey^{[a]}	3:21
13.	"Pocket"	Chinouriri; Weitz; Roberts; O'Brien	APOB	3:06
14.	"So My Darling" (acoustic)	Chinouriri; Hylton-Nuamah; Noah Kittinger; Antonio Verdi	HYLNU	3:48
Total length:				49:23

Deluxe edition vinyl bonus tracks
No.	Title	Length
14.	"All I Ever Asked"	3:37
15.	"Fun"	3:09

Digital deluxe edition bonus tracks
No.	Title	Length
11.	"Marie Kondo"	2:58
16.	"All I Ever Asked" (acoustic)	3:46
17.	"Never Need Me" (acoustic)	4:01
18.	"The Hills" (acoustic)	3:37
Total length:		63:45

Darlings Edition bonus tracks
No.	Title	Length
24.	"She Knows"	3:24

Notes

- ^{^[a]} signifies an additional producer
- 'All I Ever Asked' does not appear on physical standard edition releases.
- The 'Darlings Edition' features the digital standard edition tracklist, in addition to one new track and ten fan voice-notes throughout the album. It also features a voice-note from Chinouriri as bonus content.

== Personnel ==
Musicians

- Rachel Chinouriri – vocals (all tracks), drums (tracks 1, 9); bass, percussion, synthesizer programming (6); claps (13)
- Rich Turvey – guitar (tracks 1–4, 7, 9, 11), bass (1–3, 6, 7, 9, 11), programming (1–3, 6, 9–11), piano (1, 3, 7, 9, 11), keyboards (2–4, 6, 7, 9–12), synthesizer (3)
- APOB – bass, guitar, percussion (tracks 1, 4, 9, 13); synthesizer (1, 4, 9), strings (1); drums, keyboards (4); synth bass (9), claps (13)
- Ross Higginson – drums (tracks 1–3, 7, 9, 10)
- Glen Roberts – backing vocals (tracks 1, 8)
- Aaron Shadrow – guitar (track 2)
- Liam Hutton – drums (track 5)
- Leroy Clampitt – guitar, percussion, synthesizer programming, whistle (track 6)
- Julie Komey-Guaeloupe – vocals (track 6)
- Mae Muller – vocals (track 6)
- Clara Amfo – vocals (track 7)
- Daniel Hylton-Nuamah – guitar (tracks 8, 14), bass (8), additional synthesizer (9)
- Bryony James – cello (track 9)
- Andy Marshall – double bass (track 9)
- Emma Owens – viola (track 9)
- Jordon Bergmams – viola (track 9)
- Hayley Pomfrett – violin (track 9)
- Michael Trainor – violin (track 9)
- Natalia Bonner – violin (track 9)
- Patrick Kiernan – violin (track 9)
- Raja Halder – violin (track 9)
- Josh Scarbrow – guitar (track 10)
- Jonny Lattimer – guitar (track 10)
- Jonah Summerfield – bass, guitar, synthesizer (tracks 11, 12); piano (11)
- Antonio Verdi – vocals (track 14)

Technical

- Matt Colton – mastering (tracks 1–13)
- John Davis – mastering (track 14)
- Tom Longworth – mixing (tracks 1, 2, 4, 5, 7–13)
- Dan Grech – mixing (tracks 3, 6)
- Richard Woodcraft – mixing (track 14)
- Glen Roberts – engineering (tracks 1, 8, 9)
- Chris Taylor – engineering (track 2)
- Isabel Gracefield – string engineering (track 9)
- Rosie Danvers – string arrangement (track 9)
- Dominic Samagaio – engineering assistance (track 2)

== Charts ==
Chart performance for What a Devastating Turn of Events
Chart (2024–2025)	Peak position
Hungarian Physical Albums (MAHASZ)	22
Scottish Albums (Official Charts)	5
UK Albums (Official Charts)	17
