= What's It Like Over There? =

Studio album by Circa Waves
- Released: 5 April 2019
- Length: 30:56
- Label: PIAS, Prolifica
- Producer: Alan Moulder

Circa Waves chronology
Different Creatures (2017)	What's It Like Over There? (2019)	Sad Happy (2020)

Singles from What's It Like Over There?
- 1. "Movies" Released: 27 November 2018; 2. "Me, Myself and Hollywood" Released: 2019; 3. "Times Won't Change Me" Released: 2019; 4. "Passport" Released: 2019

What's It Like Over There? is the third studio album by the English indie rock band, Circa Waves. The album was released 5 April 2019 through PIAS Recordings and Prolifica.

== Critical reception ==
Professional ratings
Aggregate scores
Source	Rating
Metacritic	59/100
Review scores
Source	Rating
AllMusic	3.5/5 stars
DIY	2/5 stars
Dork	4/5 stars
The Independent	4/5 stars
NME	2/5 stars
Q	2/5 stars
The Skinny	4/5 stars

On Metacritic, What's It Like Over There? holds an average critic score of 59 out of 100 indicating "mixed or average reviews based on 6 critics".

Dylan Tuck, writing for The Skinny praised Circa Waves' change in trajectory compared to their first two albums: Different Creatures and Young Chasers and compared the album to the Arctic Monkeys' Tranquility Base Hotel & Casino. Describing the piano-influences in the album, Tuck said "What's It Like Over There? sees the group ditch the surging guitars in favour of more subtle, delicate touches. In a very Arctic Monkey's move, throbbing, angst-fuelled rhythms make way for piano melodies (Times Won't Change Me, Passport), ambitiously pop-infused moments incorporated with an anthemic quality (Sorry I'm Yours, Be Somebody Good), or melancholic yet upbeat ballads (The Way We Say Goodbye)." Tuck ultimately awarded the album four stars out of five.

Dork magazine staff writer, Jamie MacMillan called What's It Like Over There? a "gospel-tinged bluesy piano number". MacMillan further said that "the band have created something that few would have seen coming, a seismic shift away from their usual big guitar sound into something far poppier and unrestrained by tired old tropes." Like Tuck, MacMillan also awarded the album four stars out of five.

Hannah Mylrea, writing for New Musical Express was more critical of What's It Like Over There? Mylrea felt that the album was inconsistent, with only a handful of well composed tracks, with "lacklustre" filler tracks. Mylrea summarized the album by saying "Circa Waves are no longer are the perfect band to accompany you and your pals necking tinnies in the sun, and instead sound more like the soundtrack to a Nicholas Sparks film. ‘What's It Like Over There?’ is the band's sugar rush sound moving into a toothache." Louisa Dixon, writing for DIY, was similarly critical of the album, describing it as "both over-produced and underwhelming".

== Track listing ==
No.	Title	Length
1.	"What's It Like Over There?"	0:20
2.	"Sorry I'm Yours"	3:49
3.	"Times Won't Change Me"	3:13
4.	"Movies"	3:23
5.	"Me, Myself and Hollywood"	2:49
6.	"The Way We Say Goodbye"	4:04
7.	"Be Somebody Good"	3:00
8.	"Passport"	3:27
9.	"Motorcade"	3:42
10.	"Saviour"	3:09
Total length:		30:56

Japan bonus tracks (Disc 2)
No.	Title	Length
1.	"Something More"	3:05
2.	"Two of a Kind"	3:12
3.	"Hunters"	2:55
4.	"Ordinary Life"	4:08
5.	"Movies (Alternate Version)"	3:32
Total length:		47:51

== Charts ==
Chart (2019)	Peak position
Scottish Albums (OCC)	3
UK Albums (OCC)	4
