= Movies (Circa Waves song) =

Single by Circa Waves

from the album What's It Like Over There?
- Released: 27 November 2018
- Length: 3:24
- Label: PIAS
- Songwriter(s): Kieran Shudall
- Producer(s): Alan Moulder

Circa Waves singles chronology
"Goodbye" (2017)	"Movies" (2018)	"Me, Myself and Hollywood" (2019)

Music video
- "Movies" on YouTube

"Movies" is a song by British indie rock band, Circa Waves, from their third studio album What's It Like Over There? (2019).

The single premiered on 27 November 2018, with a lyric video released on the band's YouTube channel. On 10 January 2019, Circa Waves released a corresponding music video. The song charted on Belgium's Ultratop charts, peaking at number 11 in the Walloon Ultratop chart and 39 in the Flemish Ultratop chart. It was their first single since "T-Shirt Weather" to chart.

== Background and composition ==
The single was released with the announcement of their third studio album, What's It Like Over There? It was further announced that Alan Moulder would return as the producer for the album and the single.

== Charts ==
Chart (2019)	Peak position
Belgium (Ultratop 50 Flanders)	39
Belgium (Ultratop 50 Wallonia)	11
