= I Think I Spoke Too Soon =

- Standard edition cover

Studio album by Rachel Chinouriri
- Released: 16 October 2026
- Genres: Synth-pop; pop rock; dance-pop
- Length: 40:18
- Label: Parlophone
- Producers: APOB; Rachel Chinouriri

Rachel Chinouriri chronology
Little House (2025)	I Think I Spoke Too Soon (2026)

Singles from I Think I Spoke Too Soon
- 1. "One Song Away from Crying" Released: 29 July 2026; 2. "Make Believe" Released: 11 September 2026; 3. "Broken Chair" Released: 28 September 2026

I Think I Spoke Too Soon (stylised in sentence case) is the second studio album by the English singer-songwriter Rachel Chinouriri, released on 16 October 2026 through Parlophone, with distribution from Atlas Artists. Collaborators include Mary Weitz and Lucy Dacus. It is primarily a synth-pop, pop rock, and dance-pop album incorporating a variety of genre influences such as disco, alternative rock and Britpop. The album received generally favourable reviews from critics and reached number nine on the UK Albums Chart.

== Background and release ==
In 2024, English singer-songwriter Rachel Chinouriri released her debut studio album, What a Devastating Turn of Events, to critical acclaim. This was followed up in 2025 by the EP Little House, which critics speculated served as a preview to the sound of her second studio album.

I Think I Spoke Too Soon (stylised in sentence case) was announced on 29 July 2026, alongside the release of the lead single, "One Song Away From Crying", and the announcement of a headline tour. In an interview with The Guardian's Olive Pometsey, she explained that the title referred to how she was changing from the person that she was in her early twenties, attributing it to an astrological "shift" believed to occur in one's late twenties. She has also named her journey to sobriety and forgiving oneself for past mistakes as inspirations for the album.

Chinouriri released the second single "Make Believe" on 11 September. A third single, "Broken Chair", was released on 28 September.

== Composition ==
Multiple publications have noted the prominent use of synthesisers in I Think I Spoke Too Soon. According to Pitchfork's Grace Robins-Somerville, the album retains the alternative rock and Britpop influences of Chinouriri's debut album but adds "synthier" production. Julienne Loreto of The Line of Best Fit characterised the album's sound as a "consistent palette of synth-pop, pop rock, and what lies in between". Too Soon has also been described as a dance-pop record. Indie rock, disco, shoegaze, and electronic music influences have been observed in the album as well.

== Reception ==
Professional ratings
Aggregate scores
Source	Rating
Metacritic	77/100
Review scores
Source	Rating
Clash	8/10
The Line of Best Fit	8/10
Morning Star	4/5 stars
MusicOMH	3.5/5 stars
NME	4/5 stars
Pitchfork	7.3/10
Rolling Stone	3.5/5 stars

According to the review aggregator Metacritic, I Think I Spoke Too Soon received "generally favorable reviews" based on a weighted average score of 77 out of 100 from 6 critic scores.

Ian Sinclair of British newspaper Morning Star gave the album 4 out of 5 stars, noting that it was "bursting with ideas and musical styles" and that "there's much to love here".

== Track listing ==
I Think I Spoke Too Soon track listing
No.	Title	Writer(s)	Producer(s)	Length
1.	"One Song Away from Crying"	Rachel Chinouriri; Sarah Aarons; Aaron O'Brien; Eli Teplin; Mary Weitz	Chinouriri; APOB; Teplin^{[a]}	3:39
2.	"Pretty Girls"	Chinouriri; O'Brien; Saint Mino; Teplin; Weitz	Chinouriri; APOB; Saint Mino^{[a]}; Glen Roberts^{[v]}	3:35
3.	"Baby Steps"	Chinouriri; O'Brien; Teplin; Weitz	Chinouriri; APOB; Teplin^{[a]}	2:53
4.	"Favourite Desperation"	Chinouriri; O'Brien; Glen Roberts; Oscar Santander; Weitz	Chinouriri; APOB; Santander^{[c]}; Roberts^{[v]}	3:14
5.	"I'm a Star"	Chinouriri; Ilsey Juber; O'Brien	Chinouriri; APOB; Roberts^{[v]}	2:42
6.	"AAAHHH!!!"	Chinouriri; O'Brien; Roberts; Weitz	Chinouriri; APOB	2:24
7.	"Broken Chair"	Chinouriri; Lucy Dacus; O'Brien; Teplin; Weitz	Chinouriri; APOB; Teplin^{[a]}; Roberts^{[v]}	3:40
8.	"Shiver"	Chinouriri; O'Brien; Roberts; Aaron Shadrow; Weitz	Chinouriri; APOB; Shadrow^{[c]}; Roberts^{[v]}	3:50
9.	"Make Believe"	Chinouriri; Daniel Hylton-Nuamah; O'Brien; Ed Thomas; Weitz	Chinouriri; APOB; HYLNU^{[a]}; Thomas^{[a]}	3:30
10.	"Parasite"	Chinouriri; O'Brien; Roberts; Weitz	Chinouriri; APOB; Roberts^{[v]}	3:38
11.	"The Good Fight"	Chinouriri; O'Brien; Weitz	Chinouriri; APOB; Roberts^{[v]}	3:26
12.	"Crash This Car"	Chinouriri; Hylton-Nuamah; Jamie Rendle; Matt Zara	Chinouriri; APOB; Roberts^{[v]}	3:47
Total length:				40:18

=== Notes ===
- ^{^[c]} indicates a co-producer
- ^{^[a]} indicates an additional producer
- ^{^[v]} indicates a vocal producer
- All tracks are stylised in sentence case, except Aaahhh!!! which is stylised in all caps.

== Personnel ==
Credits are adapted from Tidal.

=== Musicians ===
- Rachel Chinouriri – vocals (all tracks), synthesizer (tracks 2, 7, 10), backing vocals (6, 7)
- APOB – drum programming (all tracks); bass, guitars, synthesizer (1–6, 8–12); 12-string guitar, acoustic guitar (3); backing vocals (7), synth bass (12)
- Sterling Laws – drums, percussion (1–6, 8, 10–12)
- Jack Conroy – guitars (1, 3–5, 10, 12), backing vocals (1, 7)
- Eli Teplin – synthesizer (1, 3, 7, 8)
- Glen Roberts – backing vocals (1, 7), percussion (4–6)
- Todd Simon – flugelhorn, trombone, trumpet (1, 11, 12)
- Phil Scully – drum programming (1)
- Matty Hamish – guitars (2, 4)
- Saint Mino – synthesizer (2)
- Lily Honigberg – viola, violin (3, 7, 8, 11, 12)
- Yi-Mei Templeman – cello (3, 7, 8, 11, 12)
- Lauren Harris – backing vocals (3, 7, 8)
- Oscar Santander – bass, guitars (4)
- Isaac Kronik – guitars (5, 12)
- Mary Weitz – backing vocals (6, 7)
- Ben Sommer – backing vocals (7)
- Hilary Sullivan – backing vocals (7)
- Aaron Shadrow – guitars, synthesizer (8)

=== Technical ===
- Joey Messina-Doerning – engineering
- Kyle Parker Smith – engineering (1, 2, 4, 6)
- Glen Roberts – engineering (1, 4–6, 10–12)
- Todd Simon – engineering (1)
- Chris Kasych – engineering (3, 5, 8, 10–12)
- Brandon Leger – engineering assistance
- Nathan Phillips – mixing
- Ryan Sierakowski – mixing assistance
- Phil Feinman – mastering

== Charts ==
Chart performance for I Think I Spoke Too Soon
Chart (2026)	Peak position
Australian Albums (ARIA)	48
Belgian Albums (Ultratop Flanders)	153
Hungarian Physical Albums (MAHASZ)	38
Scottish Albums (Official Charts)	2
UK Albums (Official Charts)	9
