= All I Ever Asked =

2022 single by Rachel Chinouriri

Single by Rachel Chinouriri

from the EP Better Off Without
- B-side: "Fun"
- Written: 2021
- Released: 8 March 2022
- Genre: Pop; rock
- Length: 3:35
- Label: Parlophone
- Songwriters: Rachel Chinouriri; Glen Roberts; Jamie Lloyd Taylor
- Producers: Oli Bayston; Daniel Hylton-Nuamah

Rachel Chinouriri singles chronology
"So My Darling" (acoustic) (2022)	"All I Ever Asked" (2022)	"Can't Get Enough" (2022)

Sombr singles chronology
"Back to Friends" (2024)	"All I Ever Asked" (remix) (2025)	"Undressed" (2025)

Music video
- "All I Ever Asked" on YouTube

"All I Ever Asked" is a song by the English singer-songwriter Rachel Chinouriri. It was released by Parlophone on 8 March 2022, as the lead single from her third extended play (EP), Better Off Without (2022). She wrote it with Glen Roberts and Jamie Lloyd Taylor, while Oli Bayston and Daniel Hylton-Nuamah handled its production. "All I Ever Asked" is a pop and rock song created after a friend of Chinouriri's breakup, with lyrics about empathy and self-worth. Music critics received it positively, with praise towards the singer's vocal performance.

In 2024, Chinouriri included "All I Ever Asked" on her debut studio album, What a Devastating Turn of Events. She performed it in several events, including music festival appearances and standalone concerts, and as part of Sabrina Carpenter's Short n' Sweet Tour, in which she served as an opening act in 2025. As a result of gaining popularity on the video-sharing app TikTok, "All I Ever Asked" appeared on the UK singles chart, peaking at number 46, and received a silver certification by the British Phonographic Industry. A remix featuring the American singer Sombr was released on 7 February 2025, followed by other alternate versions and a physical release of the original song.

== Release and promotion ==
"All I Ever Asked" was released as a single by Parlophone on 8 March 2022, after being premiered on BBC Radio 1 as Clara Amfo's "Hottest Record in the World". It was accompanied by a music video recorded in Los Angeles in a Super 8 film style. The video stars Chinouriri as she performs the song in bright locations. "All I Ever Asked" was later revealed to be the lead single from Chinouriri's third extended play (EP), Better Off Without, which followed the song on 20 May 2022 and included three other tracks. She performed "All I Ever Asked" in several events, including concerts at Hoxton Hall, London, in 2023.

Chinouriri included "All I Ever Asked" on her debut studio album, What a Devastating Turn of Events, released on 3 May 2024. It was featured on the tenth episode of the American romantic comedy television series Nobody Wants This. Following Chinouriri's appearances in music festivals, "All I Ever Asked" gained popularity on the video-sharing app TikTok. After the American singer Sabrina Carpenter discovered the song, Chinouriri served as the opening act for the Short n' Sweet Tour in 2025. She also supported the singers Lewis Capaldi and Louis Tomlinson in their respective concert tours. Chinouriri's 2025 American tour, the All I Ever Asked For Was A North American Tour, was named after the song. In 2025, "All I Ever Asked" entered the UK singles chart, peaking at number 46, and was certified silver by the British Phonographic Industry for selling 200,000 units in the UK.

A remix featuring the American singer Sombr was released on 7 February 2025; Sombr shared that he is a long-time fan of Chinouriri's works. Two alternative versions of the song followed in April and May 2025, respectively: a live version recorded at the Short n' Sweet Tour and a remix produced by the Brazilian DJ Zerb. On 20 May, the song was issued for 7-inch single vinyl format and included the exclusive track "Fun" as its B-side.

== Composition ==
"All I Ever Asked" is a pop and rock song with perceived elements of indie rock and soft rock; the latter were compared by Clash's Robin Murray to the "bangers" by the rock band Fleetwood Mac. The song's production starts with guitars and grows as the song progresses, along with Chinouriri's voice and its uptempo sound. Before the final chorus, the instrumental decreases to highlight the singer's multitracked performance as she sings: "Just a little more time, was it really that hard to do? / It was all I ever asked of you".

The lyrics of "All I Ever Asked" are a search for empathy and the process of learning to appreciate one's self-worth. Chinouriri was inspired to write "All I Ever Asked" by a friend's breakup, as she reflected on "the feeling of asking someone you love to respect you in the simplest form and realising it's the bare minimum". The singer describes a difficult romantic relationship, in which the partner seems restrained; she narrates it with an intimate and nostalgic approach, and evidences an innocent point of view. The song was written at the end of 2021.

== Critical reception ==
Upon release, music critics praised Chinouriri's vocal performance on the single. Murray believed that it sounds "heavenly" and "touches on the sublime", and later added that the song is a "perfect pop jewel". Liam Inscoe-Jones from The Line of Best Fit wrote that the aforementioned interval when Chinouriri's voice stands out was "one of the most blissful moments in music [from 2022]", and believed that it was "a choir of her own". The Guardian's Damien Morris believed that the "indie, early 00s pop and African a cappella" inspirations of Chinouriri's music "combine beautifully" on the song, commended by the critic as a highlight on Better Off Without.

== Charts ==
Chart performance for "All I Ever Asked"
Chart (2025)	Peak position
UK Singles (OCC)	46

== Certifications ==
Certifications for "All I Ever Asked"
Region	Certification	Certified units/sales
United Kingdom (BPI)	Silver	200,000^{‡}
^{‡} Sales+streaming figures based on certification alone.

== Release history ==
Release dates and formats for "All I Ever Asked"
Region	Date	Format(s)	Version	Label	Ref.
Various	8 March 2022	Digital download; streaming	Original	Parlophone	
Various	7 February 2025	Digital download; streaming	Sombr remix	Parlophone	
Various	18 April 2025	Digital download; streaming	"Short n' Sweet" version	Parlophone	
Various	16 May 2025	Digital download; streaming	Zerb remix	Parlophone	
Various	20 May 2025	7-inch single	Original	Parlophone	
