= Never Going Under =

Studio album by Circa Waves
- Released: 13 January 2023
- Length: 34:33
- Label: Lower Third; PIAS
- Producer: Kieran Shudall

Circa Waves chronology
Sad Happy (2020)	Never Going Under (2023)	Death & Love (2025)

Singles from Never Going Under
- 1. "Hell on Earth" Released: 18 August 2022; 2. "Do You Wanna Talk" Released: 23 September 2022

Never Going Under is the fifth studio album by the English indie rock band Circa Waves, released on 13 January 2023 by Lower Third and PIAS Recordings.

== Background ==
On 18 August 2022, Circa Waves released the first single "Hell on Earth". In an interview with Rolling Stone UK, lead vocalist Kieran Shudall said of the single:

Hell on Earth is about the world moving so fast around you you're struggling to keep up. Record stores closing, politicians lying more than ever, social anxiety at its highest level and that general feeling some days that everything is going wrong.

Circa Waves announced their second single "Do You Wanna Talk", along with the announcement of their fifth studio album on 23 September 2022.

== Critical reception ==
Professional ratings
Aggregate scores
Source	Rating
Metacritic	82/100
Review scores
Source	Rating
AllMusic	4/5 stars
Clash	7/10
The Daily Telegraph	4/5 stars

Never Going Under was met with "universal acclaim" reviews from critics. At Metacritic, which assigns a weighted average rating out of 100 to reviews from mainstream publications, this release received an average score of 82, based on 4 reviews.

== Track listing ==
All tracks are written by Kieran Shudall, except "Want It All Today" written by Kieran Shudall and Sam Rourke.

Never Going Under track listing
No.	Title	Length
1.	"Never Going Under"	2:14
2.	"Do You Wanna Talk"	2:26
3.	"Hell on Earth"	2:45
4.	"Your Ghost"	3:05
5.	"Carry You Home"	3:19
6.	"Northern Town"	3:47
7.	"Electric City"	2:41
8.	"Want It All Today"	2:43
9.	"Golden Days"	3:50
10.	"Hold On"	3:49
11.	"Living in the Grey"	3:54
Total length:		34:33

== Personnel ==
Circa Waves

- Kieran Shudall – vocals, guitar, keyboards, production
- Joe Falconer – guitar, vocals
- Sam Rourke – bass guitar, keyboards, vocals
- Colin Jones – drums, vocals

Additional contributors

- Robin Schmidt – mastering
- Dan Grech-Marguerat – mixing (tracks 1, 2, 4)
- Matty Green – mixing (3)
- Caesar Edmunds – mixing (5–11)
- Connor Dewhurst – artwork

== Charts ==
Chart performance for Never Going Under
Chart (2023)	Peak position
Scottish Albums (OCC)	6
UK Albums (OCC)	15
UK Independent Albums (OCC)	1
