= Death & Love =

Studio album by Circa Waves
- Released: 24 October 2025
- Studio: RAK Studios
- Genre: Indie rock
- Length: 58:14
- Labels: Lower Third; PIAS
- Producer: Kieran Shudall

Circa Waves chronology
Never Going Under (2023)	Death & Love (2025)

Singles from Death & Love
- 1. "We Made It" Released: 30 September 2024; 2. "American Dream" Released: 1 November 2024; 3. "Like You Did Before" Released: 9 December 2024; 4. "Cherry Bomb" Released: 9 July 2025; 5. "Old Balloons" Released: 25 September 2025

Death & Love is the sixth studio album by British indie rock band Circa Waves. Originally released as Death & Love Pt.1 on 31 January 2025 and later released as Death & Love Pt. 2 on 24 October 2025, the two parts collectively form the album Death & Love, which features 18 songs. It was released by Lower Third, an affiliate of PIAS Recordings.

== Background ==
Circa Waves released the single "We Made It" to announce the band's sixth album on 30 September 2024. Lead vocalist and guitarist Kieran Shudall in an interview with NME said that Part 1 of the album was influenced by his emergency heart surgery due to viral pericarditis, a heart inflammation and said of the album:

"I thought I might die before I made this record, and then I didn't, and I got to make an album of music that I loved. The shackles were off, in a way, because I had this newfound joy and excitement for being alive."

After the release of "We Made It", Circa Waves released two singles, "American Dream" on 1 November 2024 and "Like You Did Before" on 9 December 2024, ahead of the January 2025 release of Death & Love Pt.1. Following the release of Part 1, "Cherry Bomb" and "Old Balloons" were released on 9 July 2025 and 25 September 2025, respectively, prior to the launch of Death & Love Pt.2 in October 2025.

== Release ==
Death & Love Pt.1 was released on 31 January 2025 and Death & Love Pt.2 was released on 24 October 2025. Both parts of the album were available via digital download, CD and vinyl.

== Critical reception ==
Professional ratings
Aggregate scores
Source	Rating
Metacritic	82/100
Review scores
Source	Rating
AllMusic	4.5/5 stars
Clash	8/10 (Pt.1), 6/10 (Pt.2)
MusicOMH	3/5 stars
PopMatters	8/10

According to review aggregator website Metacritic, the album received "universal acclaim" from critics from mainstream publications with a weighted average score of 82/100, based on four reviews.

PopMatters writer Rich Wilhelm gave bot Death & Love Pt.1 and Death & Love Pt.2 8/10 ratings. Wilhelm described Death & Love as "2025's best pop albums". AllMusic gave the entire album 4.5/5 stars, describing it as a "rock & roll rage against the dying of the light". Emma Harrison, a writer for Clash, characterized Part 1 as a "stellar offering of euphoric resilience" and gave it 8/10-rating. Harrison later reviewed Part 2, giving it a 6/10 rating. MusicOMH gave Death & Love Pt.2 3/5 stars, with writer John Murphy criticizing the album for "sound[ing] like indie-rock by numbers". Murphy also stated that both parts of the album did a "decent job" at recording a "traumatic" period in the band.

== Track listing ==
All tracks are written by Kieran Shudall.

Death & Love track listing
No.	Title	Length
1.	"American Dream"	2:25
2.	"Like You Did Before"	3:07
3.	"We Made It"	3:14
4.	"Le Bateau"	3:10
5.	"Hold It Steady"	3:26
6.	"Let's Leave Together"	3:20
7.	"Blue Damselfly"	4:01
8.	"Everything Changed"	3:49
9.	"Bad Guys Always Win"	3:11
10.	"Lost in the Fire"	3:00
11.	"Stick Around"	3:24
12.	"Cherry Bomb"	2:58
13.	"Ten Outta Ten"	3:19
14.	"Love Me for the Weekend"	2:49
15.	"Sunbeams"	2:53
16.	"Old Balloons"	3:12
17.	"Sweet Simple Thing"	3:30
18.	"Wave Goodbye"	3:26
Total length:		58:14

== Charts ==
Chart performance for Death & Love Pt.2
Chart (2025)	Peak position
Scottish Album (OCC)	79

== Personnel ==
Circa Waves

- Kieran Shudall – vocals, guitar, keyboards, production
- Joe Falconer – guitar, vocals
- Sam Rourke – bass guitar, keyboards, vocals
- Colin Jones – drums, vocals

== See also ==
- British rock music
- Britpop
