= The LaFontaines =

Scottish rock band

- Origin: Motherwell, Lanarkshire, Scotland
- Genres: Rock, hip hop
- Years active: 2008–2025
- Labels: SO Recordings: A Wolf at Your Door; LAB; 889 Records
- Website: www.thelafontaines.co.uk

The LaFontaines were a rock band from Motherwell, Scotland. Their lineup consisted of Kerr Okan (vocals), Jamie Keenan (drums, vocals) and Darren McCaughey (guitars, production). The band was formed in 2008 and have released four studio albums: Class (2015), Common Problem (2017), Junior (2019), and Business as Usual (2024).

== History ==
=== Formation (2008–2012) ===
The band played their first concert at King Tut's Wah Wah Hut on 26 June 2008 opening for American rap duo The Cool Kids. They then went on to build a local following with shows supporting Beardyman, N-Dubz, Chiddy Bang, Mongrel and Example and Festival appearances at RockNess and Live at Loch Lomond.

In 2011, John Gerard replaced bassist Anna Smith and the band embarked on their first tour of the UK supporting Twin Atlantic. They released their first music video for "Paper Chase" and were selected to perform on the T Break stage at T in the Park. The band's performance was in front of a capacity audience, a first for the T Break stage. A headline Scottish Tour followed this with a sold out date at Stereo in Glasgow.

The following year they continued to tour the UK supporting 3OH!3 and The Blackout and self-released their first single "Light Up the Background".

=== Early releases (2013–2014) ===
On 6 April 2013 the band hosted Club Fontaine, a sold out, formal, '50s-inspired show Glasgow's Classic Grand and that summer headlined the BBC Introducing Stage at T in the Park as well as performing at Wickerman Festival and Belladrum Festival.

The single "All She Knows" was released via LAB Records on 27 October 2013 and saw the band head out on tour with Canterbury to promote this. The track was played on BBC Radio 1 and playlisted by BBC Radio Scotland.

April 2014 saw the band play their first shows in the United States with shows at both The Mercury Lounge and Bowery Ballroom in New York. Returning from the States they headed out on tour with Bad Rabbits to promote their single "Under the Storm", which was released via LAB Records on 27 April 2014. The single entered the Indie Breakers chart top 20 and is the band's most streamed song to date.

They decamped to Woking that summer to record their debut album Class with producer Matt O'Grady (You Me at Six, Don Broco, Deaf Havana) and headed out on their first tour of Europe with Watsky and Anderson Paak, finishing with a sold-out homecoming headline show at Glasgow's ABC with support from Vukovi and Gerry Cinnamon.

=== Class (2015–2016) ===
The band travelled to Marrakesh in early 2015 to film the music video for "King", which would be the first single from their debut album Class.

Class was released on 6 June 2015 via 889 records, a label set up by the band using funding from Creative Scotland and debuted at 10 in the Scottish Album Chart and number 98 in the UK Albums Chart. That summer they opened the main stage at T in The Park and headed out on their own headline UK tour to support the album release as well as support tours with Doomtree and Eliza & The Bear, ending with the band's biggest headline show to date at the Glasgow Barrowlands.

The LaFontaines supported The Summer Set on tour in May 2016 which was followed by festival appearances at 2000 Trees, Belladrum and Secret Garden Party. Guitarist Iain Findlay left the band to focus on management and that November they embarked on a headline UK and Ireland tour to support their new single "Release The Hounds".

=== Common Problem (2017–2018) ===
Common Problem was recorded at the beginning of 2017 in Manchester with Joe Cross (Courteeners, Hurts) and was released on 27 October 2017 via A Wolf at Your Door Records.

That summer the band performed at Download Festival, The Great Escape, TRNSMT, Reehaperbhan and opened the BBC Radio 1Xtra Stage at Leeds & Reading. The first single from the album, "Asleep", was released on 27 August 2017 and was followed by "Common Problem", which saw the band travel to Venice to shoot the music video.

Winter 2017 saw the band head out on their most successful headline tour thus far, including a sold-out show at London's Boston Music Room as well as another sold-out show at Glasgow Barrowlands, where the band were introduced on stage by Game of Thrones actor Rory McCann.

In April 2018, bassist John Gerard left the band and they continued to perform as a four piece with guitarist Neil Mulholland.

The band toured with Don Broco& Yungblud throughout the UK, Ireland and Europe in April/May 2018.

On 15 June 2018 the band released "Up" via SO Recordings. The song was played on Annie Mac's BBC Radio 1 show on 18 July 2018. The band then embarked on a headline tour of the UK, Ireland and Europe throughout September and October.

The LaFontaines replaced J Hus on the main stage at TRNSMT festival on 30 June 2018 opening the 2nd day of the festival. They also appeared on the main stage at Belladrum in Scotland and at Hammer Summer & Eier Mit Speck in Germany that summer.

On 9 December 2018, the band performed at the NH7 Weekender in Pune, India and closed out the year with a homecoming show at Motherwell Concert Hall on 23 December.

=== Junior (2019–2023) ===
On 8 March 2019, the band announced the departure of guitarist/vocalist Neil Mulholland and announced that drummer Jamie Keenan would be taking on lead vocals as well as continuing drumming duties. Four days later the band released new song "All In" as their debut as a three piece while also announcing that new album Junior would be released in June 2019.

Their first show as a trio was opening up for Mike Shinoda at the Roundhouse (venue) in Camden. In March 2019, they supported Deaf Havana throughout the UK and Ireland.

The band's third studio album Junior was released via SO Recordings on 14 June 2019 to critical acclaim. The album charted at number 33 in the UK Albums Chart, giving the band their first top 40 record. They supported the release of the album with the Junior tour across the UK.

That summer the band performed at Y Not Festival, Liverpool Sound City, United Islands of Prague, Home Festival in Venice, Italy, supported Kaiser Chiefs in Inverness & Montrose and opened the BBC Radio 1 Dance Stage at Reading and Leeds Festivals.

In September and October 2019, The LaFontaines embarked on an extensive tour of the UK, Ireland & Europe (dubbed "The Top 40 Tour") in support of Junior which concluded in Paris on the 26th of October

November 2019 saw the band close out the year with an appearance at the VERY TV Festival in Bangkok, Thailand.

On 24 March 2020, the band began releasing a weekly podcast, titled The LaFontaines Podcast, where initially, each week they dissect a short story from Jamie Keenan's book The LaFontaines Solve Twelve of Life's Most Common Problems. The podcast has since moved on to include occasional interviews with musicians, actors and internet personalities in addition to weekly discussions from the band.

The band released a 4-track EP consisting of re-worked acoustic versions of tracks from Junior on 28 August 2020, titled Junior (Acoustic Tapes).

After its initial composition on The LaFontaines Podcast, "Scotland, Bonnie Scotland" – the band's comedy football anthem – was released to coincide with Scotland's UEFA Euro 2020 bid on 2 June 2021. Footballer David Marshall appears alongside the band in the video along with a host of media personalities from across Scotland.

The LaFontaines released the stand alone single "Is It Free?" on 2 November 2021, which coincided with a short UK tour, ending with the band's biggest headline show to date at the O2 Academy Glasgow on Friday 19 November 2021.

The band joined label mates Deaf Havana and Sick Joy on their UK tour throughout March and April 2022

=== Business as Usual (2024) ===
The LaFontaines fourth album 'Business As Usual' was released on 14 June 2024 (exactly five years to the date since their third album 'Junior' was released) and topped the Scottish album charts debuting at number 1, giving their band their first Scottish number 1 album. Largely written during the COVID pandemic, the album was recorded between Rubbergum Studios in Glasgow and Costal Sound Recording Studio in Liverpool with producers Thomas McNeice & Tom Longworth

The band supported the record on their first UK tour since 2021 which began at Glasgow Barrowland on 13 September 2024 and concluded at Omeara in London on 20 September 2024

=== Break-up (2024-2025) ===
On 1 December 2024, the band announced that they were going to disband, and that they would be performing three final shows, one in London and two in Glasgow.

Glass Cheques, a new music project from founding members Jamie Keenan & Darren McCaughey was announced on 18 March 2025. They made their live debut supporting The LaFontaines at their final shows, with headline dates following on 21 May in Glasgow and 27 May in London. They released their first single 'Seeking Adventure' on 18 February 2026 and supported Edwyn Collins on his Spanish tour between April & May 2026.

== Musical style ==
Their style has often been related to genres such as alternative rock, hip hop, pop rock and punk by reviewers. The band are often quoted in interviews saying that the band's sound "really sounds like it shouldn’t work but it does". Infusing hip hop bars in their native Glaswegian tongue with big guitar riffs and anthemic choruses. The band cite being influenced by hip hop, grime, rock and indie music, specifically calling out The Streets, Anderson Paak & Beastie Boys as having an impact on their sound.

== Members ==
=== Present ===
- Kerr Okan – vocals (2008–2025)
- Jamie Keenan – vocals, drums (2008–2025)
- Darren McCaughey – guitar, production (2008–2025)

=== Former ===
- Anna Smith – bass guitar (2008–2011)
- Iain Findlay – guitar (2008–2016)
- John Gerard – vocals, bass guitar (2011–2018)
- Neil Mulholland – vocals, guitar (2016–2019)

== Discography ==
=== Studio albums ===
Title	Details	Peak chart positions	
Title	Details	SCO	UK
Class	Released: 8 June 2015; Label: 889; Formats: CD, vinyl, download	10	98
Common Problem	Released: 27 October 2017; Label: A Wolf at Your Door; Formats: CD, vinyl, download	9	—
Junior	Released: 14 June 2019; Label: So; Formats: CD, vinyl, cassette, download	2	33
Business as Usual	Released: 14 June 2024; Label: So; Formats: CD, vinyl, cassette, download	1	—

=== Extended plays ===
Title	Details
All She Knows	Released: 27 October 2013
Under the Storm	Released: 27 April 2014
Junior (Acoustic Tapes)	Released: 28 August 2020

=== Singles ===
Year	Title	Album/EP
2012	"Light Up the Background"	Non-album single
2013	"All She Knows"	All She Knows
2014	"Under the Storm"	Under the Storm
2015	"King"	Class
2015	"Junior Dragon"	Class
2016	"Release the Hounds"	Common Problem
2017	"Asleep"	Common Problem
2018	"Common Problem"	Common Problem
2018	"Armour"	Common Problem
2018	"Up"	Junior
2019	"All In"	Junior
2019	"Alpha"	Junior
2021	"Scotland, Bonnie Scotland"	Non-album single
2025	“Superstar (2025)”	Non-album single
