= Sad Happy =

Studio album by Circa Waves
- Released: 13 March 2020
- Length: 43:32
- Label: PIAS, Prolifica

Circa Waves chronology
What's It Like Over There? (2019)	Sad Happy (2020)	Never Going Under (2023)

Professional ratings
Aggregate scores
Source	Rating
AnyDecentMusic?	6.7/10
Metacritic	82/100
Review scores
Source	Rating
AllMusic	4.5/5 stars
DIY	2/5 stars
NME	4/5 stars

Sad Happy is the fourth studio album by the English indie rock band Circa Waves. The album was released as a double album with "Happy" being released on 10 January 2020 and "Sad" being released on 13 March 2020 through PIAS Recordings and Prolifica.

== Critical reception ==
Sad Happy was met with universal acclaim reviews from critics. At Metacritic, which assigns a weighted average rating out of 100 to reviews from mainstream publications, this release received an average score of 82, based on 4 reviews.

== Track listing ==
Happy track listing
No.	Title	Length
1.	"Jacqueline"	2:42
2.	"Be Your Drug"	2:28
3.	"Move to San Francisco"	3:01
4.	"Wasted on You"	3:10
5.	"The Things We Knew Last Night"	3:28
6.	"Call Your Name"	3:11
7.	"Love You More"	3:43

Sad track listing
No.	Title	Length
1.	"Sad Happy"	3:41
2.	"Wake Up Call"	2:53
3.	"Sympathy"	2:55
4.	"Battered & Bruised"	2:23
5.	"Hope There's a Heaven"	3:50
6.	"Train to Lime Street"	1:45
7.	"Birthday Cake"	4:22

Japanese edition bonus track
No.	Title	Length
15.	"Holding Up In There"	3:51
Total length:		47:35

== Charts ==
Chart performance for Sad Happy
Chart (2020)	Peak position
Scottish Albums (OCC)	4
UK Albums (OCC)	4
UK Independent Albums (OCC)	2
