= Calum Bowie =

Scottish musician

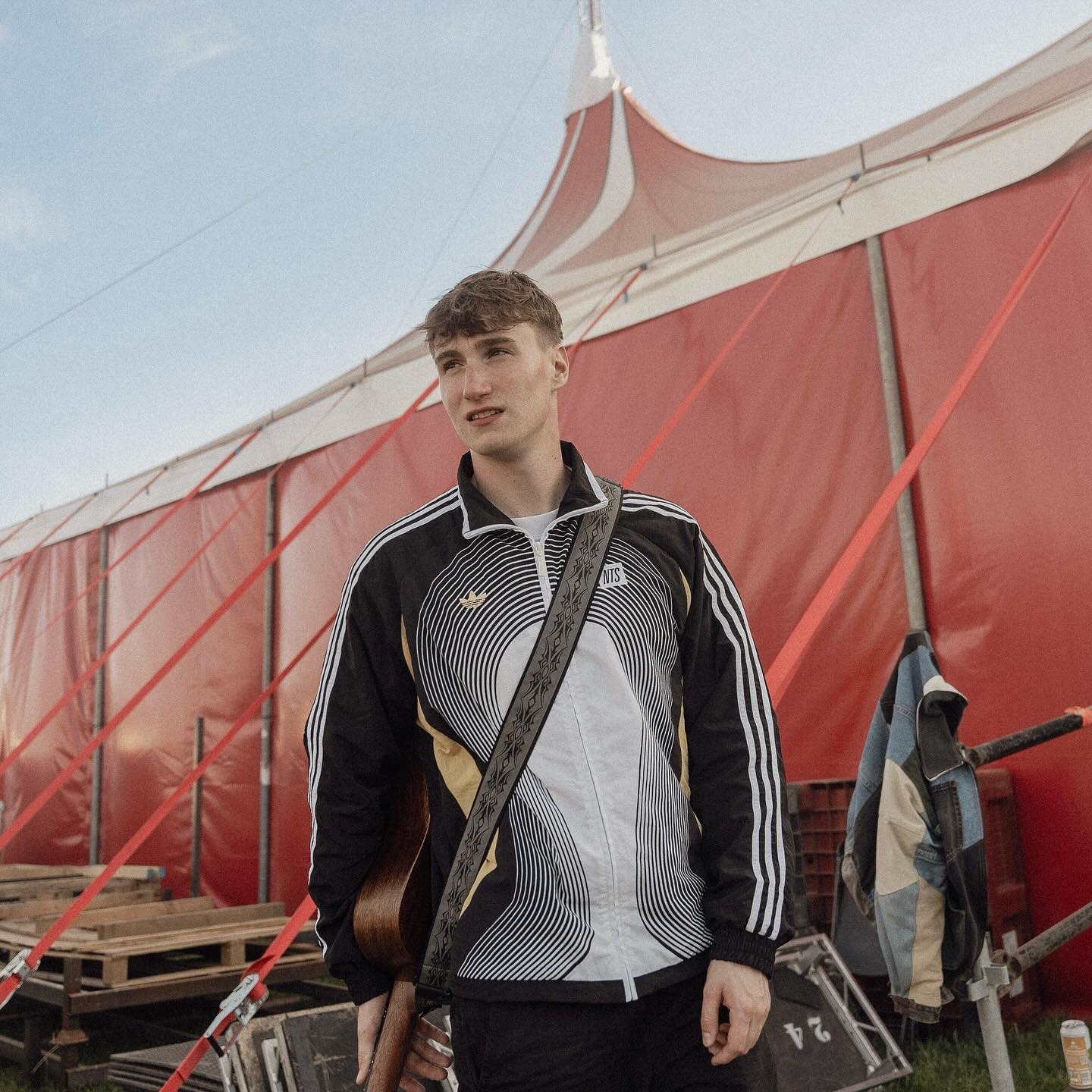
- Calum Bowie at Glastonbury

Background information
- Born: Calum Bowie; 28 December 2000 (age 25); Banchory, Aberdeenshire, Scotland
- Genres: Indie-pop: Singer-songwriter; Folk-pop
- Occupations: Musician; Singer; Songwriter
- Years active: 2018–present
- Label: Capitol Records
- Website: calumbowie.com

Calum Bowie (born 28 December 2000) is a Scottish singer-songwriter from Banchory, Aberdeenshire, now based in Edinburgh. He began playing guitar at the age of eight.

Bowie released his early independent project Lonely Streets around the age of 17 to 18 while attending Banchory Academy. After signing a record deal a few years later, he released his official major-label debut single "We Are The River" on 2 February 2024.

On 21 March 2025, Bowie release his major-label debut EP, "Through The Window". The project debuted successfully, peaking at number four on the Scottish Albums Chart. An expanded version of the EP was released later that year on 5 December, containing a new single "Sliding Doors" and alternate versions of pre-existing songs.

Bowie's music is influenced by artists such as Sam Fender, Ed Sheeran, and Nina Nesbitt. In 2023, he performed at several UK festivals, including The Great Escape, TRNSMT, Kendal Calling, and Y Not1. His 2024 performances include appearances at Glastonbury, Boardmasters, and Belladrum festivals, as well as tours with Dylan Gossett, James Marriott, Myles Smith and Arthur Hill. He has also supported established artists such as James Arthur and Cian Ducrot. He also opened the main stage at TRNSMT 2025.

As of December 2024, Bowie has over 85,000 monthly listeners on Spotify, with his music accumulating more than 3 million global streams. He has gained popularity on social media platforms, particularly TikTok, where his videos have received millions of views.

Bowie's music has been featured on BBC Radio 1's Future Pop, Future Alternative, and Future Artists shows. He has also been featured as 'Single of the Week' on BBC Radio Scotland and has been championed by Janice Forsyth on BBC Radio Scotland's Afternoon Show. In November 2024, Calum has also received the Scottish Breakthrough Artist of the Year award at the Scottish Music Awards. During his most recent tour (2026) he has performed in different areas of the United Kingdom including, Manchester and London.

Despite sharing a surname with David Bowie, Calum is not related to the late musician. Coincidentally, Calum's father is also named David, though he goes by Dave.
