= Rachel Chinouriri =

British singer-songwriter (born 1998)

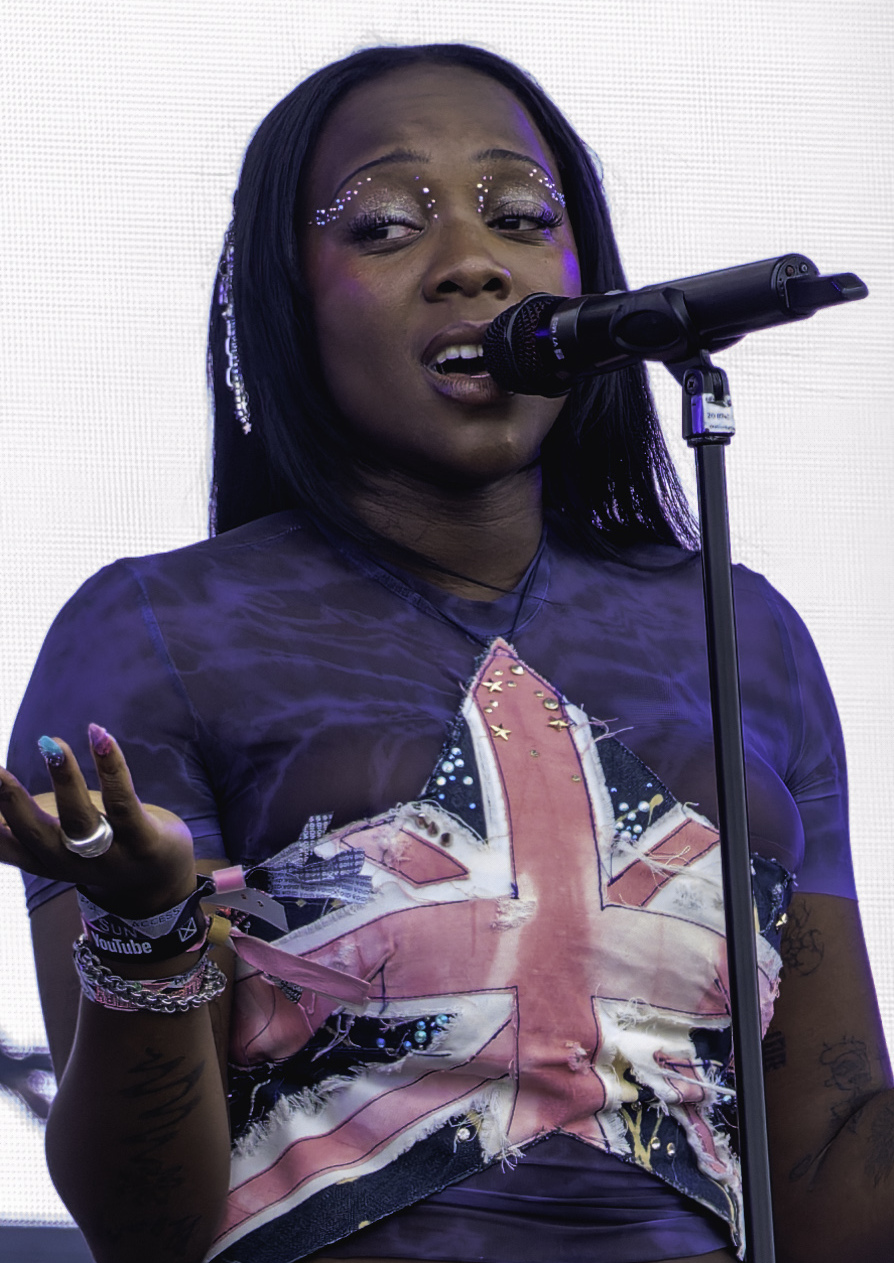
- Chinouriri in 2024

Background information
- Born: 1 November 1998 (age 27); Kingston upon Thames, London, England
- Origin: Croydon, London, England
- Genres: Alternative pop; indie pop; pop rock; indie rock; Britpop revival
- Occupation: Singer-songwriter
- Instrument: Vocals
- Years active: 2018–present
- Label: Parlophone
- Website: www.rachelchinouriri.com

Rachel Chinouriri (born 1 November 1998; pronounced /ˌtʃɪnəˈriːri/, CHIN-ə-REE-ree) is an English singer-songwriter and record producer. After posting numerous songs on SoundCloud, she began releasing music on major streaming platforms in 2018. She released her debut extended play (EP), Mama's Boy, in 2019 to critical acclaim. One of the songs from the EP, "So My Darling", received attention on TikTok when it became a popular audio to use.

Chinouriri was signed to Parlophone, with whom she released her debut mini-album, Four° In Winter, in 2021. Its single "Give Me A Reason" was nominated for a Ivor Novello Award in the category "Best Contemporary Song". She then released her second EP, Better Off Without, in 2022. Chinouriri released her debut studio album, What a Devastating Turn of Events, in May 2024, followed by the EP Little House in 2025. In 2026, Chinouriri released her second studio album I Think I Spoke Too Soon.

== Early life and education ==
Chinouriri was born in Kingston Hospital on 1 November 1998. Her family later moved to the Forestdale area of Croydon, where she was raised from the age of three. Her family had moved to UK from Zimbabwe shortly prior to her birth, and she experienced a "traditional African upbringing". Her four siblings were born in Zimbabwe and they were raised Christian. She attended the performing arts school BRIT School. Her upbringing led her to be curious about British culture, specifically its music, and as a teenager, she became influenced by the discographies of Daughter and Lily Allen. At the age of 17, Chinouriri began writing songs and recorded them on a £20 microphone, uploading them to the music-sharing website SoundCloud via her mother's laptop.

== Career ==
Chinouriri's first gig was supporting Celeste at the Laylow members club in London in October 2017. Chinouriri began formally releasing various singles on major streaming platforms in 2018, which led to her being signed to Parlophone. Her first release with the label was "So My Darling", which she wrote aged 17 and released in 2018. The song received radio play when it was picked as a special play on BBC Radio 1. She was then announced as an act at Field Day festival in 2019. Chinouriri followed "So My Darling" with "Adrenaline" in April 2019. She played a headline show in London in June 2019.

Chinouriri released her debut extended play (EP), Mama's Boy, in August 2019. It was released to critical acclaim. Following the release, she dropped the song "Where Do I Go?", which she said was written about her thoughts on the afterlife. She played at Dot to Dot Festival and Pitchfork Music Festival that year. The song "Beautiful Disaster", featuring Sam Dotia, was released in July 2012. Tom Bibby of Yuck magazine described the song as "an honest and heartfelt portrayal of the isolation and stillness felt in the midnight hours, told through Chinouriri's powerful falsettos", adding that she has proved herself to be "a powerful singer-songwriter". She then released various singles, including "Give Me a Reason", "Darker Place" and "Through the Eye". The latter acted as the lead single for her debut mini-album, Four° in Winter, which was released in September 2021. She released a deluxe edition later that year, with the addition of three new songs.

In January 2022, after the rise in popularity of her 2018 single "So My Darling" on the video sharing app TikTok, Chinouriri re-released the song in acoustic form. At the time of release, the audio had more than 40,000 videos shared on TikTok. In March 2022, she released the single "All I Ever Asked". The song was chosen as that week's "Hottest Record in the World" by BBC Radio 1's Clara Amfo. Chinouriri subsequently announced plans for a second EP that would feature the song, as well as a national tour throughout the UK. That summer, she played at the Great Escape Festival and Boardmasters Festival, and also had a gig supporting Sam Fender.

In early 2023, Chinouriri was one of the openers for Lewis Capaldi on his tour, and humorously told the story of how she had secured the gig through having sent him a drunk DM. She played at a number of summer festivals, including Latitude Festival, Truck Festival, Kendal Calling, Connect Music Festival, and All Points East. Later that year, she was selected as one of the openers for Louis Tomlinson on the Europe leg of his Faith in the Future World Tour.

In January 2024, Chinouriri announced that she would be releasing her debut album, What a Devastating Turn of Events, on 3 May. Four singles were released in the build-up leading to the record: "The Hills", "Never Need Me", the title track and "It Is What It Is". What a Devastating Turn of Events debuted at number 17 on the UK Albums Chart, and at number 5 on the Scottish Albums Chart during the week starting from 10 May 2024. Also in May, the artist performed as one of the headliners on the Introducing Stage at BBC Radio 1's Big Weekend festival in Luton. In June, Chinouriri played on the Other Stage at Glastonbury Festival 2024, playing both her own songs and a cover of Estelle's American Boy. In July, it was announced that she would be the opener for the United Kingdom and European leg of the Short n' Sweet Tour by Sabrina Carpenter.

On 7 February 2025, Chinouriri released a new version of "All I Ever Asked", recorded in collaboration with American singer-songwriter Sombr. On 4 April 2025, Chinouriri released the EP Little House, consisting of four tracks including the single "Can We Talk About Isaac?". Chinouriri has mentioned the EP is written about her "dreams of maybe having a little house with my future partner." On 28 November 2025, she released the song "Little House" as the final song from Little House.

In July 2026, she supported Wolf Alice in Finsbury Park. Later that month, she won the Silver Clef Award for best new music. Chinouriri is scheduled to perform as the opening act for some of the North American dates of the 2026 leg of Gracie Abrams' upcoming The Look at My Life Tour.

On 30 July 2026, Chinouriri released "One Song Away from Crying" as the lead single from her second studio album, I Think I Spoke Too Soon, due for release on 16 October 2026. Alongside the album she announced tour dates for late 2026 and early 2027 in North America, Europe and Oceania.

== Artistry ==
Chinouriri grew up listening to indie music, pop girl groups such as Girls Aloud, The Saturdays and the Sugababes; African a cappella; and Britpop bands like Oasis, Blur, and The Libertines; as well as the likes of V V Brown and Noisettes. She cited Daughter and Ladysmith Black Mambazo among her main influences, while Coldplay is her favourite band. She has also expressed an admiration for Sampha, Kings of Leon, and Phoenix. For her debut album, Chinouriri took inspiration from the sonic and visual aesthetics of the noughties Britpop culture and icons of her childhood.

== Personal life ==
In March 2024, Chinouriri was one of the acts who decided to boycott the South by Southwest music festival in Austin, Texas, over the event's sponsorship deal with the US Army and major defence contractors, and in protest against the Gaza genocide. In a statement of social media, Chinouriri explained her decision by stating that the topic of war was "extremely triggering" for her, as both her parents had served as child soldiers in Zimbabwe before emigrating to the United Kingdom; she also encouraged fans to "support victims of war in any capacity". She lives in Camden.

== Discography ==
=== Studio albums ===
Title	Details	Peak chart positions				
Title	Details	UK	AUS	BEL (FL)	HUN Phys.	SCO
What a Devastating Turn of Events	Released: 3 May 2024; Label: Parlophone; Format: CD, LP, digital download, streaming	17	—	—	22	5
I Think I Spoke Too Soon	Released: 16 October 2026; Label: Parlophone; Format: CD, LP, digital download, streaming	9	48	153	—	2

=== Mini-albums ===
List of mini-albums, with selected details
Title	Details
Four° in Winter	Released: 23 April 2021; Label: Parlophone; Format: Digital download, streaming

=== Extended plays ===
Title	Details	Peak chart positions
Title	Details	SCO
Mama's Boy	Released: 21 August 2019; Label: Marathon; Format: Digital download, streaming	—
Better Off Without	Released: 20 May 2022; Label: Parlophone; Format: Digital download, streaming, LP	—
Live at KOKO	Released: 23 August 2024; Label: Parlophone; Format: Digital download, streaming	—
Little House	Released: 4 April 2025; Label: Parlophone; Format: Digital download, streaming	42

=== Singles ===
==== As lead artist ====
List of singles as lead artist, with selected chart positions and certifications, showing year released and album name
Title	Year	Peak chart positions		Certifications	Album
Title	Year	UK	EST Air.	Certifications	Album
"What Have I Ever Done"	2018	—	—		Non-album single
"So My Darling"	2018	—	—		Non-album single
"Adrenaline"	2019	—	—		Mama's Boy
"Mama's Boy"	2019	—	—		Mama's Boy
"Where Do I Go?"	2019	—	—		Non-album single
"Beautiful Disaster" (with Sam Dotia)	2020	—	—		Four° in Winter
"Give Me a Reason"	2020	—	—		Four° in Winter
"What the World Needs Now"	2020	—	—		Non-album single
"Darker Place"	2021	—	—		Four° in Winter
"Through the Eye"	2021	—	—		Four° in Winter
"November" (featuring Hak Baker)	2021	—	—		Non-album single
"If Only"	2021	—	—		Four° in Winter
"All I Ever Asked"	2022	46	—	BPI: Silver	Better Off Without
"Thank You for Nothing"	2022	—	—		Better Off Without
"Smithereens" (with Boyish)	2022	—	—		Non-album singles
"I'm Not Perfect (But I'm Trying)"	2022	—	—		Non-album singles
"Maybe I'm Lonely"	2023	—	—		Non-album singles
"Ribs"	2023	—	—		Non-album singles
"The Hills"	2023	—	—		What a Devastating Turn of Events
"Never Need Me"	2024	—	—		What a Devastating Turn of Events
"What a Devastating Turn of Events"	2024	—	—		What a Devastating Turn of Events
"It Is What It Is"	2024	—	—		What a Devastating Turn of Events
"Even" (with Cat Burns)	2024	—	—		Non-album single
"Can We Talk About Isaac?"	2025	—	—		Little House
"What a Life"	2025	—	—		Little House
"One Song Away From Crying"	2026	—	83		I Think I Spoke Too Soon
"Make Believe"	2026	—	—		I Think I Spoke Too Soon
"Broken Chair"	2026	—	—		I Think I Spoke Too Soon
"—" denotes recording that did not chart in that territory.

==== As featured artist ====
List of singles as featured artist, showing year released and album name
Title	Year	Album
"Animals (MK Remix)" (Preditah featuring Rachel Chinouriri)	2019	Non-album single
"Stuck" (Kam-Bu featuring Rachel Chinouriri)	2021	Black on Black
"Right Together" (Conducta featuring Rachel Chinouriri)	2021	Non-album single
"Can't Get Enough" (p-rallel featuring Rachel Chinouriri & Venna)	2022	Forward
"End of the Road" (The Snuts featuring Rachel Chinouriri)	2022	Burn the Empire
"Love Me in Chapters II" (Chrissi featuring Rachel Chinouriri)	2023	Non-album single
"Fairytale" (Mac Wetha featuring Rachel Chinouriri)	2023	Mac Wetha & Friends 2
"Parachute" (Shimza featuring Rachel Chinouriri)	2024	Non-album single
"Romeo + Rachel Chinouriri" (PinkPantheress featuring Rachel Chinouriri)	2025	Fancy Some More?
"Chameleon" (Alemeda with Rachel Chinouriri)	2025	But What The Hell Do I Know?

== Tours ==
Headlining

- What a Devastating Turn of Events (2024)
- All I Ever Asked for Was a North American Tour (2025)

Supporting

- Short n' Sweet Tour (2025)
- Everybody Scream Tour (2026)
- The Look at My Life Tour (2026)

== Awards and nominations ==
Year	Award ceremony	Category	Nominee(s)/work(s)	Result	Ref.
2025	Brit Awards	Artist of the Year	Herself	Nominated	
2025	Brit Awards	Best New Artist	Herself	Nominated	
