= The Ninth Wave (band) =

Scottish band

- Origin: Glasgow, Scotland
- Genres: Post-punk; new wave; synth-pop
- Years active: 2017–2022, 2024–present
- Members: Haydn Park-Patterson; Millie Kidd; Kyalo Searle-Mbullu; Calum Stewart

The Ninth Wave is a Scottish band. Formed in Glasgow, the band consists of Haydn Park-Patterson, Millie Kidd, Kyalo Searle-Mbullu and Calum Stewart. They have released two albums and one EP, all of which have been nominated for the Scottish Album of the Year Award.

== History ==
Band members Haydn Park-Patterson and Millie Kidd have known each other since childhood. Park-Patterson, his brother Ronan Park and cousin Finlay Park played in a band entitled The Ninth Wave, a name Park-Patterson and Kidd later adopted for their own musical project. Prior to taking up music professionally, Park-Patterson had been working in a coffee shop. The duo later recruited Kyalo Searle-Mbullu and Calum Stewart, whom they had known from other bands, to join the band. The band have performed at South by Southwest and headlined Glasgow's TRNSMT festival, and have opened for fellow Scottish band Chvrches.

In 2019, the band released their first album, Infancy, which was shortlisted for the Scottish Album of the Year Award. The album also received a nomination for Best Independent Album at the AIM Independent Music Awards. Also in 2019 while filming a video for a song from this album, the band issued a public warning due to the video including a dummy being thrown off a roof.

In 2020, the band released an EP, Happy Days! accompanied by a single, Everything Will Be Fine. The EP went on to be shortlisted for the Scottish Album of the Year award.

In 2022, the band announced that they would be going on an indefinite hiatus after the release of their second album, Heavy Like a Headache. The album was again nominated on the longlist for the Scottish Album of the Year award. They played their final gig before the hiatus on 19 March, describing the gigs in a statement as possibly being their "last ever".

In 2024, the band reunited, performing their first reunited live performance on 11 May, at Saint Luke's church in Glasgow. Following this, in 2026 the band released new single Bitumen

== Musical style and influences ==
Critics have categorised the band as post-punk, synth pop and new wave. Their music often includes elements of gothic rock. Their music often makes use of aggressive drums, synthesizers and jangle guitars with heavy reverb. Their earliest music contained significant influence from shoegaze.

They have cited influences including the Cure, Editors, Gilla Band, the Velvet Underground, Eartheater, Yves Tumor, Kelly Lee Owens, Massive Attack, Young Fathers, Sibylle Baier, Townes Van Zandt, Savages, Sophie and Warpaint. Kidd has described her musical influences as including Grimes, FKA Twigs and Marika Hackman, while Park-Patterson's influences include Rush, AC/DC and Psychedelic Furs.

== Members ==
=== Current members ===
- Haydn Park-Patterson - vocals, guitar
- Millie Kidd - bass, vocals
- Kyalo Searle-Mbullu - keyboard
- Calum Stewart - drums

== Discography ==
=== Albums ===
- Infancy (2019)
- Heavy Like A Headache (2022)

=== EPs ===
- Reformation (2017)
- Never Crave Attention (2018)
- Happy Days! (2020)
