= Boxed In (musician) =

British singer, songwriter, and record producer

- Born: Oliver George Bayston
- Origin: London, England
- Genres: Electro, dance, pop
- Years active: 2012–present
- Labels: Nettwerk Music Group; Domino
- Website: boxedinmusic.com

Oliver George Bayston, known professionally as Boxed In, is a British singer, songwriter and record producer. He has produced music for the likes of Olivia Dean, Mary in the Junkyard, and Fat Dog.

== History ==
The name, Boxed In, is partly inspired by Francis Bacon's infamous painting Head VI, once described as "the operation through which the entire body escapes through the mouth", a phrase which also seemed to befit the act of singing.

After featuring in The Guardian's "New band of the day" in October 2013, Boxed In released his first single "All Your Love Is Gone" through Moshi Moshi Records in November 2013. His eponymous, electro-dance-pop debut album followed in January 2015, released by Nettwerk Records, to a swathe of positive reviews, including from NME, Clash, and The Line of Best Fit. Stylistically, the album drew comparisons with LCD Soundsystem and Hot Chip.

The album, and lead singles "Mystery", "Run Quicker" and "False Alarm", were supported across BBC Radio 1 (including Huw Stephens' It's Album Time session), BBC Radio 6 Music (including a live session with Lauren Laverne), KCRW (the album reached the station's top 10 albums of 2015) and Spotify. This led to sold-out shows at London's XOYO and Oslo (Hackney) venues. After seeing them perform at SXSW in March 2015, KCRW music director Jason Bentley invited the band to Los Angeles to perform alongside TV on the radio at the station's Sound In Focus festival.

On 22 April 2016, producer Dan Carey's Speedy Wunderground label (which invites a band to write and record a track in 24 hours at Carey's South London studio) released its 16th single "Running Out" by Boxed In feat. Formation, a British breakthrough dance-pop act.

Single Jist was released in June 2016, ahead of Boxed In's second album, Melt, which was released in September that year. A second single from the album, Forget, followed a month later, remixed by George FitzGerald.

== Discography ==
- Boxed In (2015)
- Melt (2016)
