= Oslo (club) =

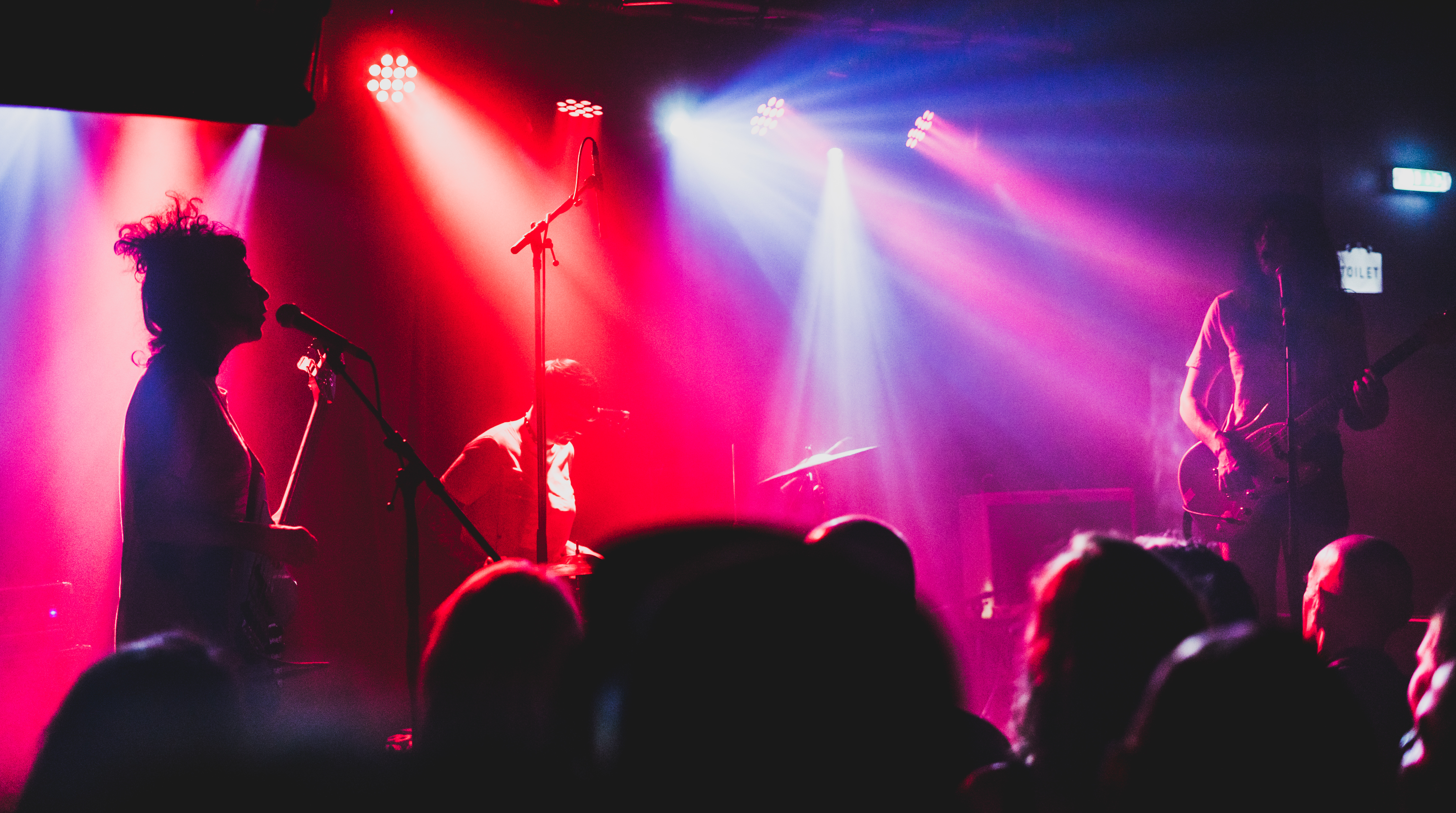
- The Coathangers at Oslo
- Interactive map of Oslo
- Address: 1a Amhurst Road, Hackney; London; United Kingdom
- Coordinates: 51°32′50.22″N 0°3′20.07″W
- Event: music
- Public transit: Hackney Central railway station

Construction
- Opened: 2014

Website
- www.oslohackney.com

Oslo is a live music venue, bar and club, located in Hackney Central, East London. It was one of the first clubs to open in the area.

The venue took over the iconic listed Hackney Central Railway Station Victorian building, and was re-developed on two floors becoming a popular destination for the night life of East London.

The venue's programme includes live music events, club nights, and festivals.

Notable musicians that played in the venue include Sam Smith, Måneskin, Dua Lipa, Marina and the Diamonds, Klaxons, Sky Ferreira, and The Last Dinner Party.

DJs that have played in the venue include AJ Odudu, Frederick Macpherson, Billie JD Porter, George Craig and Jack Peñate.

Jessie J performed an exclusive concert on her birthday on March 27, 2014 while presenter Maya Jama hosted her Halloween Party in 2022.

The venue is operated by national promoter DHP Family Ltd.
