= T-Shirt Weather =

Single by Circa Waves

from the album Young Chasers
- Released: 6 April 2015
- Genre: Surf rock; indie pop
- Length: 3:11
- Label: Virgin EMI

Circa Waves singles chronology
| "Fossils" (2015) | "T-Shirt Weather" (2015) | "Stuck in My Teeth" (2015) |

Music video
- "T-Shirt Weather" on YouTube

"T-Shirt Weather" is a song by British indie rock band Circa Waves from their debut studio album, Young Chasers (2015).

The single was released on 6 April 2015. The single is the band's most successful single to date, earning Silver certification by the British Phonographic Industry. The single charted in the UK, Scotland, Belgium and Japan.

== Charts ==
| Chart (2015) | Peak position |
|---|---|
| Belgium (Ultratop 50 Flanders) | 32 |
| Belgium (Ultratop 50 Wallonia) | 20 |
| Scotland (OCC) | 80 |
| UK Singles Chart (Official Charts Company) | 161 |
| UK Singles Downloads (OCC) | 80 |
| Japan (Japan Hot 100) (Billboard) | 43 |

== Certifications ==
| Region | Certification | Certified units/sales |
|---|---|---|
| United Kingdom (BPI) | Platinum | 600,000^{‡} |
^{‡} Sales+streaming figures based on certification alone.
