= Young Chasers =

Studio album by Circa Waves
- Released: 30 March 2015
- Genre: Indie Rock, Garage Rock
- Length: 41:53
- Label: Virgin EMI

Circa Waves chronology
T-Shirt Weather (2015)	Young Chasers (2015)	Different Creatures (2017)

Singles from Young Chasers
- 1. "Young Chasers" Released: 21 July 2014; 2. "So Long" Released: 5 September 2014; 3. "Fossils" Released: 19 January 2015; 4. "T-Shirt Weather" Released: 6 April 2015; 5. "Stuck In My Teeth" Released: 15 June 2015; 6. "My Love" Released: 13 November 2015

Professional ratings
Aggregate scores
Source	Rating
Metacritic	72/100
Review scores
Source	Rating
Allmusic	4/5 stars
The Guardian	3/5 stars
NME	4/5 stars
Q	3/5 stars

Young Chasers is the debut studio album by British indie rock band, Circa Waves. The album was released 30 March 2015 through Virgin EMI Records. The album has been certified silver in the United Kingdom by British Phonographic Industry.

== Track listing ==
No.	Title	Length
1.	"Get Away"	3:22
2.	"T-Shirt Weather"	3:12
3.	"Fossils"	2:48
4.	"Lost It"	3:08
5.	"My Love"	3:19
6.	"Deserve This"	3:15
7.	"Young Chasers"	2:10
8.	"Good For Me"	2:31
9.	"Stuck In My Teeth"	3:07
10.	"Best Years"	2:53
11.	"The Luck Has Gone"	2:44
12.	"So Long"	3:42
13.	"Talking Out Loud"	3:21
14.	"100 Strangers"	2:21
Total length:		41:53

== Charting ==
Chart (2015)	Peak position
Scottish Albums (OCC)	13
UK Albums (OCC)	10
UK Album Downloads (OCC)	8
