= Clean Cut Kid =

English indie pop band

- Origin: Liverpool, UK
- Genres: Lofi pop, indie alt rock
- Years active: 2014 – present
- Labels: Babe Magnet, Polydor Records
- Members: Mike Halls; Evelyn Halls; Ross Higginson; Gareth Bullock
- Past members: Saul Godman; Anne Robinson; Bradley Walsh; Ben Shephard
- Website: cleancutkid.co.uk

Clean Cut Kid are an English indie pop band from Liverpool, formed in 2012. At present, the band consists of Mike Halls (lead vocals, guitar), Evelyn Halls (backing vocals, keys), Ross Higginson (drums) and Gareth Bullock (bass guitar). Originally, the band also contained Saul Godman (bass) but he departed in late 2017.

The band released their debut album Felt in May 2017, and have played extensive touring schedule to date, covering 91 shows and 31 different festivals across five countries in 2016 alone, as well as support slots on tour with The Courteeners, The Kooks, Michael Kiwanuka, The Killers and Circa Waves.

== History ==
=== Formation ===
Clean Cut Kid formed in 2012 after members Mike Halls and Evelyn Halls were set up on a blind date by a friend. After some time writing together, the pair recruited bassist Saul Godman and later drummer Ross Higginson, both of whom they had known from the local music scene in Liverpool.

=== 2015–2017 ===
The band released their debut single "Vitamin C" through Babe Magnet/Polydor in July 2015 to praise from the likes of DIY Magazine ("Clean Cut Kid are the thing missing in your life") and The Line of Best Fit ("impressive, infectious debut").

=== 2017 – present ===
In February 2017, the band announced via their social media pages and press that their debut album Felt would be coming later that year. The album was released on 5 May 2017.

In October 2017, Mike and Evelyn announced on SoundCheck Podcast that they had started work on their second album the same day they finished Felt. It was also announced that they would be parting ways with Polydor for their next release with a desire to go independent for more creative freedom.

Around the same time, it was announced through the band's Instagram page that bassist Saul Godman had left the band.

== Discography ==
=== Albums ===
- Felt (2017)
- Painwave (2019)
- Mother's Milk (2021)
- Hiss (2022)
- A Crisis of Faith at the Death of a Loved One (2023)
- Seven Sounds, Forever. (2025)

=== Extended plays ===
- We Used to Be in Love (2016)
- Multivitamin (2017)
- Painkiller (2018)

=== Singles ===
Title	Year	Album
"Vitamin C"	2015	Felt
"Runaway"	2015	Felt
"Pick Me Up"	2016	Felt
"We Used to Be in Love"	2016	Felt
"Make Believe"	2016	Felt
"Leaving You Behind"	2017	Felt
"Felt"	2017	Felt
"Emily"	2018	Painwave
"Slow Progress"	2018	Painwave
"Deafening"	2018	Painwave
"I Don't Like You But I Love You"	2019	Painwave
"Good Lord (You've Come So Far)"	2020	Non-album singles
"Worrying"	2020	Non-album singles
"Suffering"	2020	Mother's Milk
"Woman"	2021	Mother's Milk
"Heavy As"	2021	Hiss
"Lewis, Be Brave"	2021	Hiss
"Little Black Space"	2022	Hiss
"Inside My Head"	2022	Hiss
"She Takes a Pill"	2022	Hiss
"Death Narrative"	2023	A Crisis of Faith at the Death of a Loved One
"Black Suit"	2023	A Crisis of Faith at the Death of a Loved One
"Bea's Last Lullaby"	2025	Non-album single
