= Boyish (band) =

American indie rock duo

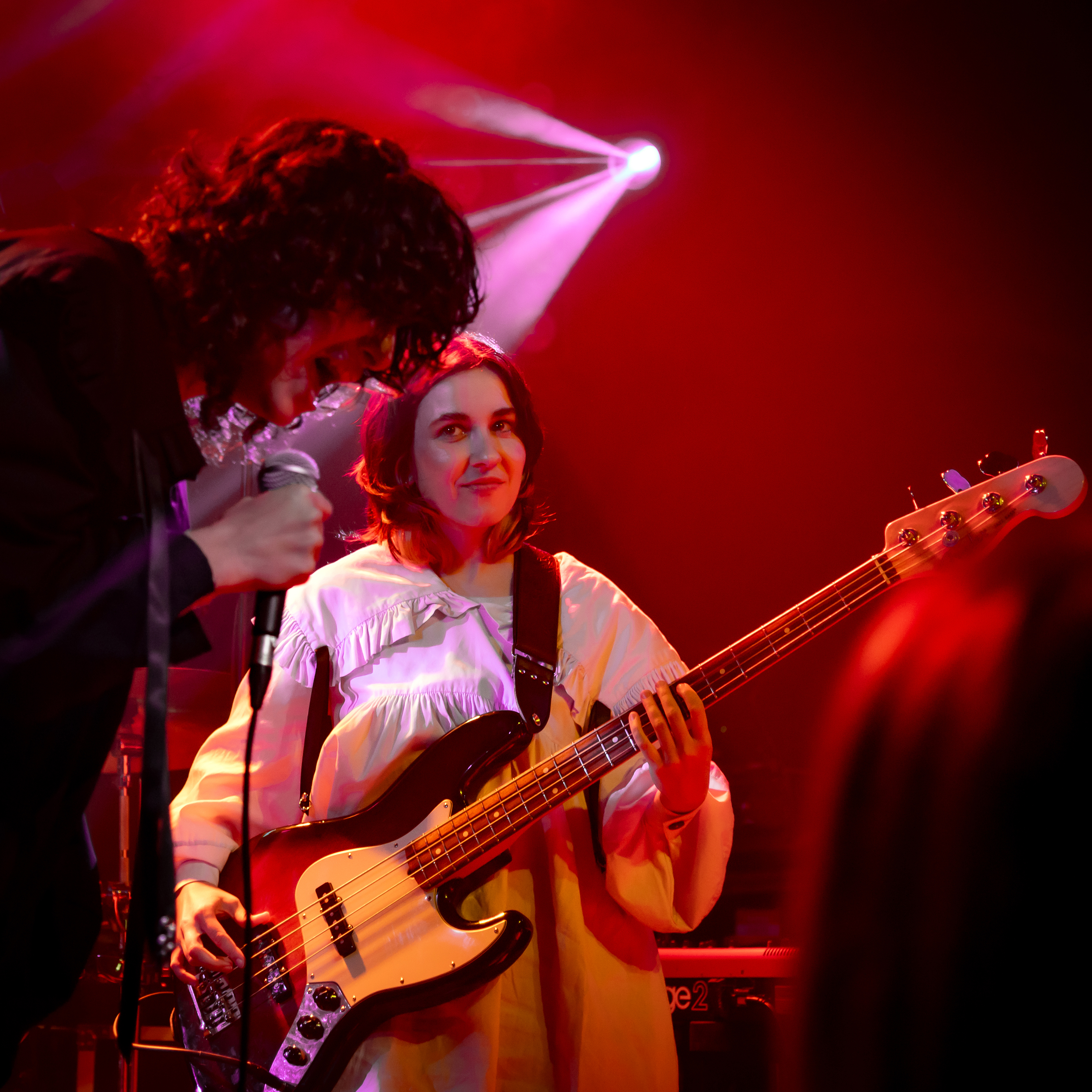
- Boyish, performing at the Troubadour in West Hollywood, CA, February 2024

Background information
- Also known as: The Blue
- Origin: Brooklyn, NY
- Genres: Indie rock, dream pop, shoegaze, alt-country
- Years active: 2016–present
- Label: Invertebrate
- Members: India Shore; Claire Altendahl
- Website: boyishmusic.com

Boyish is an indie rock duo that got its start in Boston before relocating to New York City in 2019. The group currently consists of lead vocalist India Shore, vocalist and guitar player Claire Altendahl.

The band was formed by Shore and Altendahl for an audition at Berklee College of Music under the moniker The Blue before changing their name to Boyish. They have released two studio albums to date: Carnation and Garden Spider. The former was nominated for an Independent Music Awards, featured in the New Yorker, and now streamed over 1 million times. The single 'FUCK YOU HEATHER' from Garden Spider premiered on Atwood Magazine and was played over 3,500,000 times on Spotify. In February 2021, Boyish released "Superstar" the first track off their EP We're all going to die, but here's my contribution, which was released on May 28, 2021 with four tracks. It received positive write-ups from Lyrical Lemonade, Highclouds, and Atwood Magazine. Additionally, the song currently has over 1,600,000 streams and was added to several editorial playlists such as Lorem, All New Indie, Indie Pop & Chill, and Fresh Finds. On May 27, 2022, Boyish released EP My Friend Mica, which was preceded by singles "Smithereens," "Congratulations," and "I Think I Hate It Here." Shore and Altendahl said of their inspiration of the project, "we didn’t have a concept beyond what was happening in our lives at the time" and "The whole EP is like one long journal entry, or a stream of consciousness of the past year. We really tried to take the emotions we were currently wrestling with and direct them into these songs".

In June 2023, Boyish released a single titled "Kill Your Pain", featuring King Princess. They went on to join them as the opening act for their European tour.

== Discography ==
=== Studio albums ===
Title	Details
Gun	Released: 2025; Label: R&R

=== Extended plays ===
Title	Details
Carnation	Released: July 1, 2018; Label: Self-released
Garden Spider	Released: February 14, 2020; Label: Invertabrate
We're All Gonna Die, But Here's My Contribution	Released: February 14, 2021; Label: Amuseio AB
My Friend Mica	Released: May 27, 2022; Label: R&R
Little Demon Boy	Released: September 8, 2023; Label: R&R
We're All Gonna Die, But Here Are Some Covers	Released: May 17, 2024; Label: R&R
