= Circa Waves =

English indie rock band

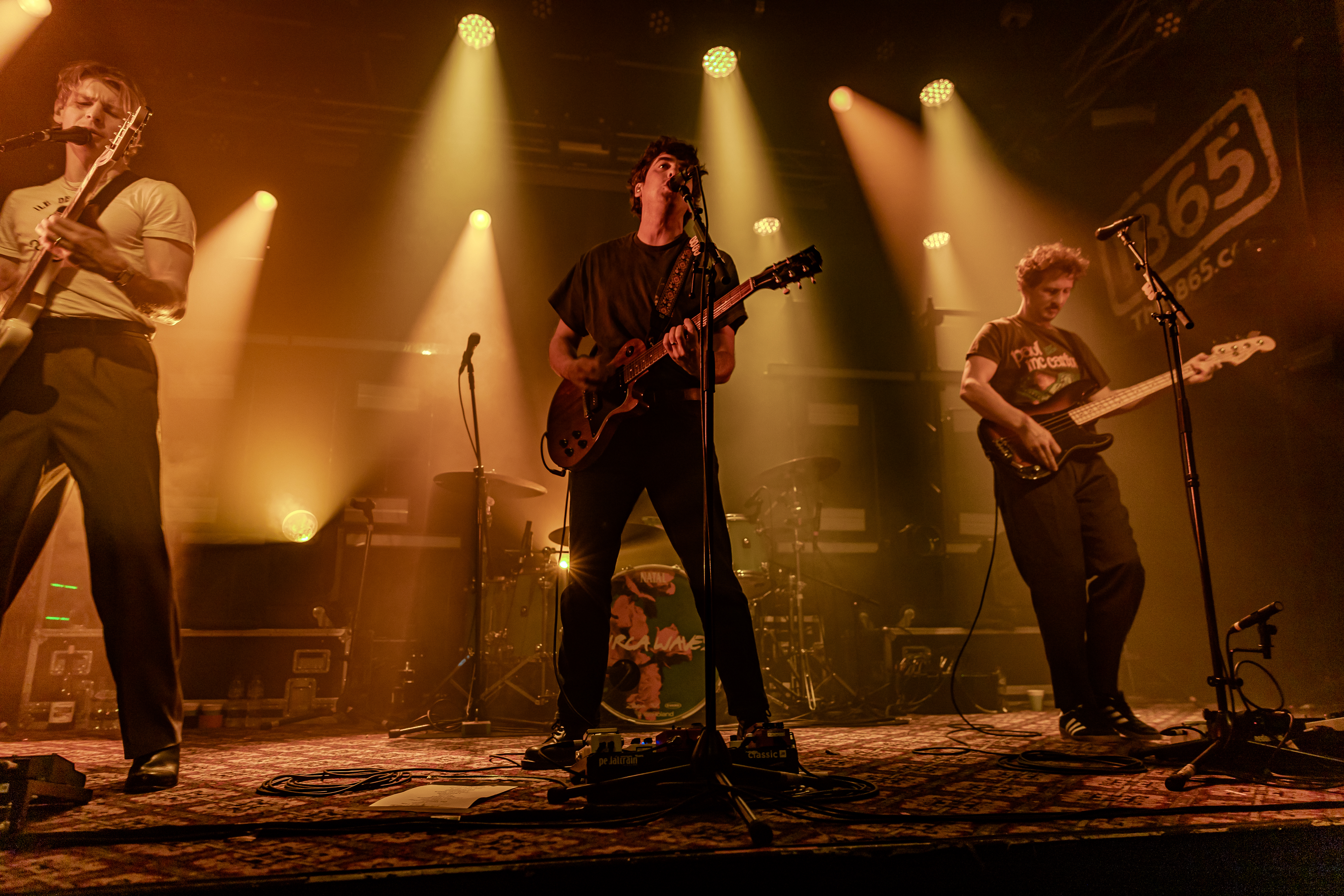
- Circa Waves performing during their Death & Love tour in Southampton, 2025

Background information
- Origin: Liverpool, England
- Genres: Indie rock
- Years active: 2013–present
- Labels: Transgressive; Virgin EMI; Dew Process; Prolifica; PIAS; Lower Third
- Members: Kieran Shudall; Sam Rourke; Colin Jones; Joe Falconer
- Past members: Sian Plummer
- Website: circawaves.com

Circa Waves are an English indie rock band formed in Liverpool in 2013. The band consists of lead vocalist and guitarist Kieran Shudall, guitarist Joe Falconer, bassist Sam Rourke, and drummer Colin Jones.

== History ==
=== Early years (2013) ===
Shudall met both Rourke and Plummer through mutual friends at the annual music festival Liverpool Sound City in 2013, meeting Falconer not long after at the same festival where he worked as a stage manager. Shudall had decided to commit fully to music after spending years in a succession of not-so-big garage bands. During the summer and autumn of 2013 the band played several short UK tours, which included some secret shows. In a July 2014 interview in Paris, Falconer stated regarding the band name's origin, "Kieran wrote the demo for "Young Chasers", recorded it and uploaded it to SoundCloud in one day. As he was uploading it he needed a name and it was the first thing that came into his head in that split second."

=== Debut single and Young Chasers EP (2013–2014) ===
On 2 December 2013, the band released their debut single "Get Away/Good for Me", a double A-side on Transgressive Records handled by Jen Long's Kissibility label. In February 2014, radio DJ Zane Lowe played the band's second single "Stuck in My Teeth" as his Hottest Record in the World. The band opened the NME Awards Tour in March 2014, which also included Temples, Interpol and Royal Blood. On 10 June 2014 Circa Waves released their Young Chasers EP on Virgin Records in the US. A Japanese edition was released on 2 July 2014.

Also during 2014 they supported the 1975 on tour around the UK.

Circa Waves performed at various festivals during the summer of 2014, including Hurricane and Southside Festivals in Germany, Latitude Festival, T in the Park, Glastonbury Festival, and Splendour in the Grass (Australia). They also performed at Arenal Sound (Spain), Summer Sonic Festival in Japan, and at Reading and Leeds Festival at the end of August 2014.

The band also supported the Libertines in September 2014.

=== Young Chasers (2014–2015) ===
The band released their debut studio album, Young Chasers, on 30 March 2015 which reached 10 in the UK Album Charts and performed at a number of festivals, including Glastonbury, Reading and Leeds and Boardmasters. The album has been certified silver in the UK by British Phonographic Industry. In October 2015, the band toured the UK, including a sold out date at Brixton Academy.

=== Different Creatures (2016–2018) ===
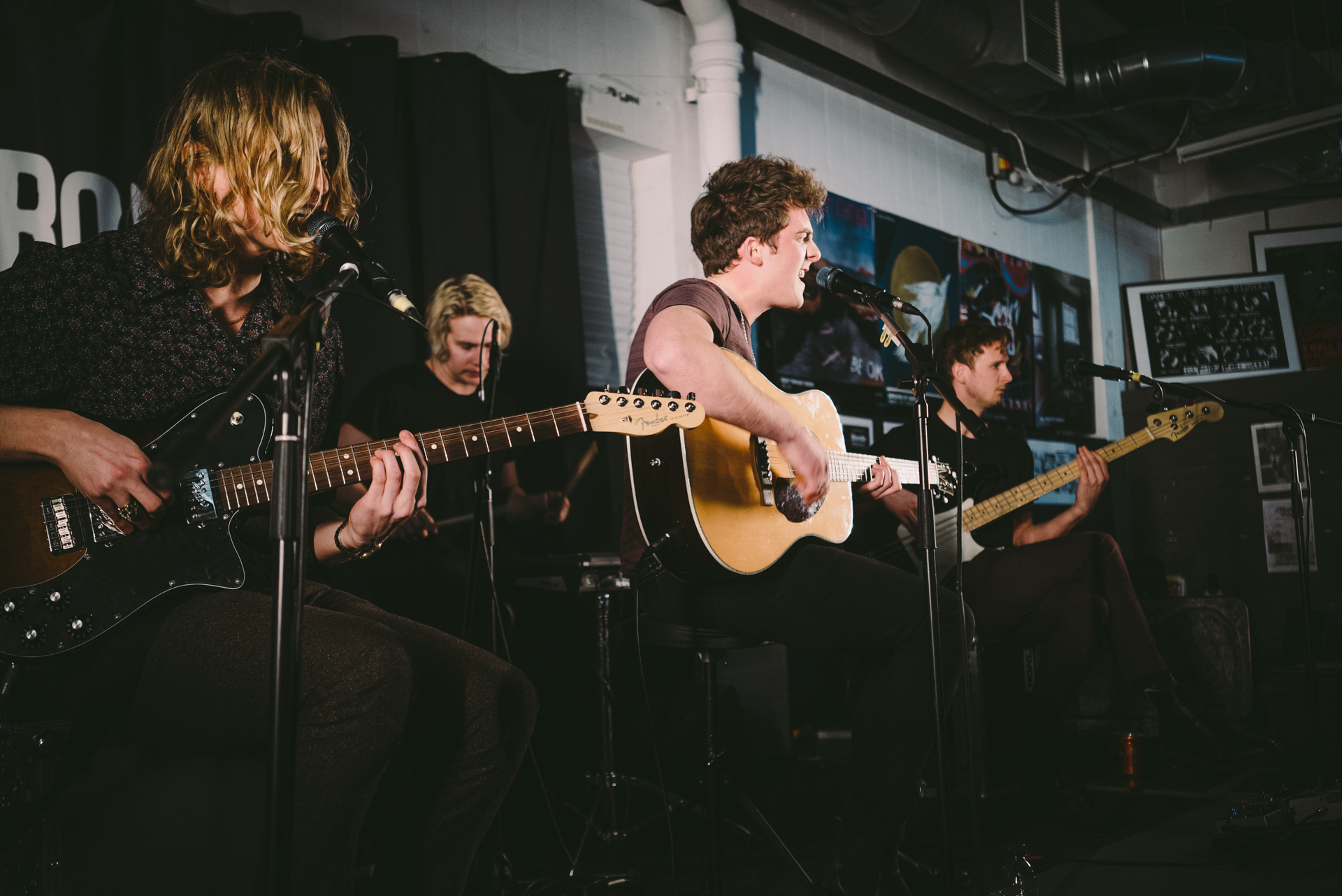
Circa Waves performing at Rough Trade in Nottingham, 2017

Circa Waves announced their second studio album, Different Creatures, on 24 November 2016, releasing the first single from the album "Wake Up" the same day. The album marks a departure from the garage rock sound of the band, in favour of an alternative rock style, with the prevalence of thicker and distorted guitar sound. The Guardian newspaper's review labelled the album 'darker, denser'.

The second single from the album, "Fire That Burns", was released on 26 January 2017. The album was released on 10 March 2017.

The album was released on 10 March 2017, and peaked on the UK Albums Chart at number 11.

=== What's It Like Over There (2019) ===
On 5 April 2019 the band released their third studio album titled, What's It Like Over There?, to critical success. It was supported by the singles, "Times Won't Change Me", "Movies", and "The Way We Say Goodbye". The release marks a return to the more indie sound of the band. The album earned critical acclaim for its mix of indie and pop rock, as well as the experimentation by the band. It peaked at Number 10 on the UK Albums Chart.

=== Sad Happy (2019–2020) ===
On 19 November 2019 the band released the single "Jacqueline" via BBC Radio 1. The single was accompanied by the announcement of their upcoming studio album Sad Happy. The album was released in two parts, with the Happy side released in January 2020 and the Sad side followed in March 2020. According to the band, the double album concept "represents two sides of this tech-saturated, highly insecure age".

=== Never Going Under and Hell On Earth EP (2022–2023) ===
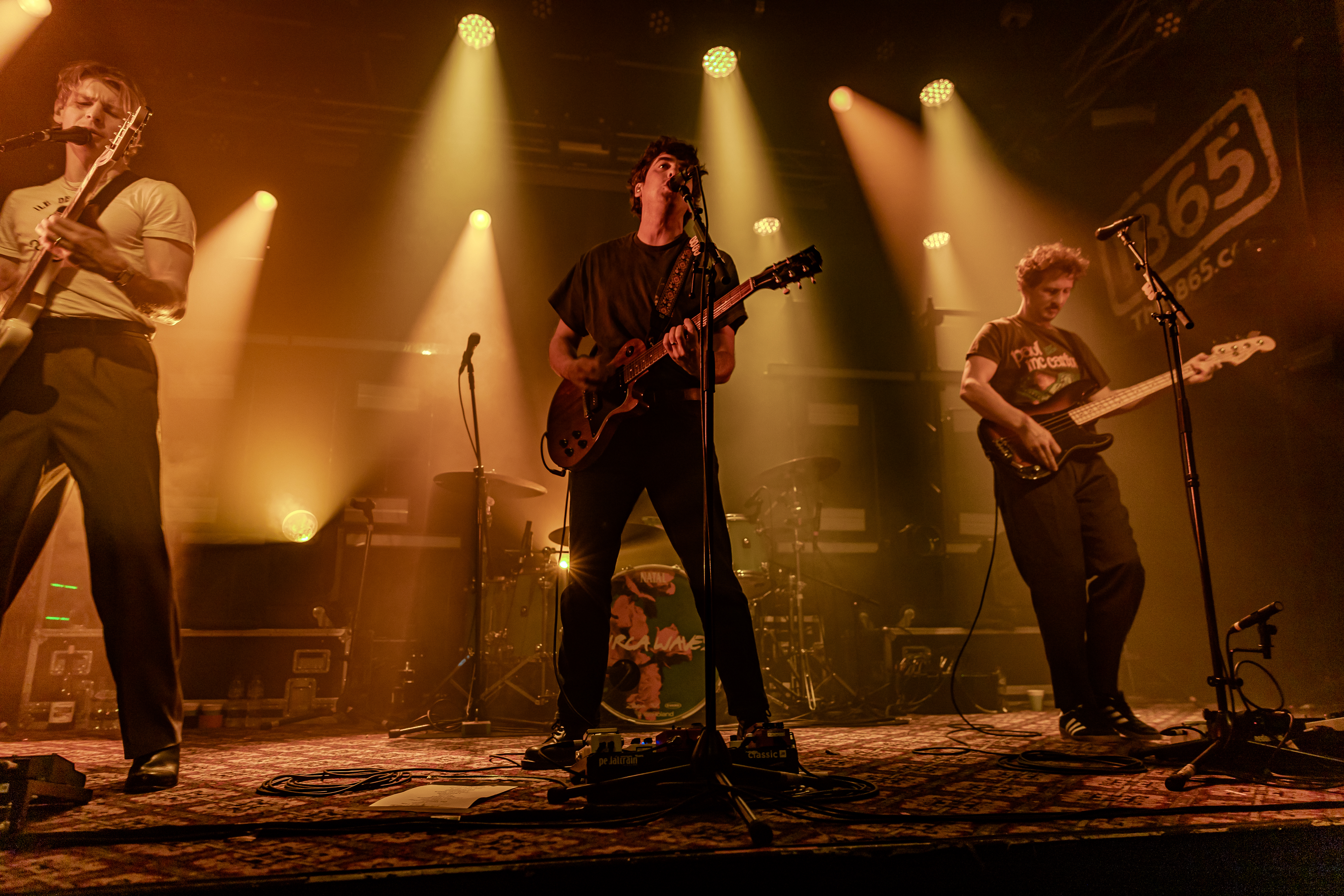
Circa Waves performing during their Death & Love tour in Southampton, 2025

On 17 August 2022, the band released the single "Hell On Earth". The single was accompanied by the release of their EP Hell On Earth two days later on 19 August 2022. Then on 22 September 2022 the band released the single "Do You Wanna Talk" via BBC Radio 1. The single was accompanied by the announcement of their upcoming fifth studio album Never Going Under. It was further supported by the singles, "Carry You Home", Living in the Grey" and "Never Going Under". The album was released on 13 January 2023 and reached Number 1 on the UK Independent Album Chart.

In 2023, Shudall underwent emergency surgery to address a severe blockage in the main artery in his heart. Due to his surgery, the band had to cancel a number of shows. According to Shudall, his health scare had considerable influence on the upcoming sixth studio album Death & Love, Pt. 1.

=== Death & Love (2024–present) ===
On 30 September 2024, the band released the single "We Made It". The single was accompanied by the announcement of the first part of the upcoming sixth album Death & Love, released as Death & Love, Pt. 1. It was further supported by the singles, "American Dream" and "Like You Did Before". The album was released on 31 January 2025.

On 8 July 2025, the band released the single "Cherry Bomb". The album Death & Love released on 24 October 2025.

== Band members ==
Current

- Kieran Shudall – lead vocals, rhythm guitar (2013–present)
- Joe Falconer – lead guitar, piano, backing vocals (2013–present)
- Sam Rourke – bass guitar, keyboard, backing vocals (2013–present)
- Colin Jones – drums (2015–present)

Former

- Sian Plummer – drums (2013–2015)

== Discography ==
=== Studio albums ===
Title	Details	Peak chart positions				Certifications
Title	Details	UK	UK Indie	AUS Hit.	SCO	Certifications
Young Chasers	Released: 30 March 2015; Label: Virgin; Format: Digital download, CD, vinyl	10	—	8	13	BPI: Silver
Different Creatures	Released: 10 March 2017; Label: Virgin; Format: Digital download, CD, vinyl, cassette	11	—	11	13	
What's It Like Over There?	Released: 5 April 2019; Label: Prolifica; Format: Digital download, CD, vinyl, cassette	10	3	17	3	
Sad Happy	Released: 13 March 2020; Label: Prolifica; Format: Digital download, CD, vinyl, cassette	4	2	—	4	
Never Going Under	Released: 13 January 2023; Label: Lower Third; Format: Digital download, CD, vinyl, cassette	15	1	—	6	
Death & Love, Pt. 1	Released: 31 January 2025; Label: Lower Third; Format: Digital download, CD, vinyl, cassette	— (Note: Death & Love, Pt. 1 did not enter the UK Albums Chart, but peaked at number 33 on the UK Album Downloads Chart.)	—	—	—	
Death & Love, Pt. 2	Released: 24 October 2025; Label: Lower Third; Format: Digital download, CD, vinyl, cassette	— (Note: Death & Love, Pt. 2 did not enter the UK Albums Chart, but peaked at number 96 on the UK Album Sales Chart.)	31	—	79	
"—" denotes a recording that did not chart or was not released in that territory.

=== Extended plays ===
Title	Details
T-Shirt Weather	Released: 23 February 2015; Label: Virgin; Format: Digital download
Happy	Released: 10 January 2020; Label: Prolifica; Format: Digital download, streaming
Hell on Earth	Released: 19 August 2022; Label: Lower Third; Format: Digital download, streaming

=== Singles ===
Title	Year	Peak chart positions								Certifications	Album
Title	Year	UK	UK Rock	BEL (FL) Tip	BEL (WA) Tip	JPN	NLD Tip	SCO	SWI Air	Certifications	Album
"Good for Me" / "Get Away"	2013	— (Note: "Good for Me" did not enter the UK Singles Chart, but peaked at number 24 on the UK Physical Singles Chart.)	—	—	—	—	—	—	—		Young Chasers
"So Long"	2014	— (Note: "So Long" did not enter the UK Singles Chart, but peaked at number 43 on the UK Physical Singles Chart.)	—	86	—	—	—	—	—		Young Chasers
"Stuck in My Teeth"	2014	— (Note: "Stuck in My Teeth" did not enter the UK Singles Chart, but peaked at number 11 on the UK Physical Singles Chart.)	—	28	—	—	—	—	—		Young Chasers
"Young Chasers"	2014	— (Note: "Young Chasers" did not enter the UK Singles Chart, but peaked at number 11 on the UK Physical Singles Chart.)	—	—	—	—	—	—	—		Young Chasers
"T-Shirt Weather"	2015	161	—	20	32	43	8	80	—	BPI: Platinum	Young Chasers
"Fossils"	2015	—	—	—	—	—	—	—	—		Young Chasers
"My Love"	2015	— (Note: "My Love" did not enter the UK Singles Chart, but peaked at number 20 on the UK Physical Singles Chart.)	—	—	—	—	—	—	—		Young Chasers
"Something Like You"	2015	— (Note: "Something Like You" did not enter the UK Singles Chart, but peaked at number 83 on the UK Physical Singles Chart.)	—	—	—	—	—	—	—		Non-album single
"Wake Up"	2017	—	35	—	—	—	—	—	—		Different Creatures
"Fire That Burns"	2017	—	—	—	—	—	—	—	—		Different Creatures
"Somebody Else"	2017	—	—	—	—	—	—	—	—		Different Creatures
"Goodbye"	2017	—	—	—	—	—	—	—	—		Different Creatures
"Movies"	2018	—	—	11	39	—	—	—	—		What's It Like Over There?
"Me, Myself and Hollywood"	2019	—	—	—	—	—	—	—	—		What's It Like Over There?
"Times Won't Change Me"	2019	—	—	— (Note: "Times Won't Change Me" did not enter the Wallonie Ultratop, but charted as an "extra tip" on the Ultratop Bubbling Under chart.)	—	—	—	—	—		What's It Like Over There?
"Jacqueline"	2019	—	—	31	—	—	—	—	—		Sad Happy
"Move to San Francisco"	2020	—	—	—	—	—	—	—	—		Sad Happy
"Sad Happy"	2020	—	—	—	—	—	—	—	—		Sad Happy
"Battered & Bruised"	2020	—	—	—	—	—	—	—	—		Sad Happy
"There She Goes" (The La's cover)	2020	—	—	—	—	—	—	—	—		Non-album singles
"Lemonade" (featuring Alfie Templeman)	2020	—	—	—	—	—	—	—	—		Non-album singles
"Miss Christmas"	2020	—	—	—	—	—	—	×	—		Non-album singles
"Hell on Earth"	2022	—	—	—	—	—	—	×	—		Never Going Under
"Do You Wanna Talk"	2022	—	—	—	—	—	—	×	—		Never Going Under
"Carry You Home"	2022	—	—	—	—	— (Note: "Carry You Home" did not enter the Billboard Japan Hot 100 chart, but peaked at number 15 on the Billboard Japan Hot Overseas Songs chart.)	—	×	58		Never Going Under
"Living in the Grey"	2022	—	—	—	—	—	—	×	—		Never Going Under
"We Made It"	2024	—	—	—	—	—	—	×	—		Death & Love, Pt. 1
"American Dream"	2024	—	—	—	—	—	—	×	—		Death & Love, Pt. 1
"Like You Did Before"	2024	—	—	—	—	—	—	×	—		Death & Love, Pt. 1
"Cherry Bomb"	2025	—	—	—	—	—	—	×	—		Death & Love
"Stick Around"	2025	—	—	—	—	—	—	×	—		Death & Love
"—" denotes a recording that did not chart or was not released in that territory. "×" denotes periods where charts did not exist or were not archived

==== Promotional singles ====
Title	Year	Album
"Be Somebody Good"	2018	What's It Like Over There?

=== Other appearances ===
List of other non-single song appearances
Title	Year	Album
"Spend It" (with Peking Duk)	2022	Non-album singles
