= TRNSMT =

Music festival in Glasgow, Scotland

Coordinates: 55.8527805°N 4.2381062°W

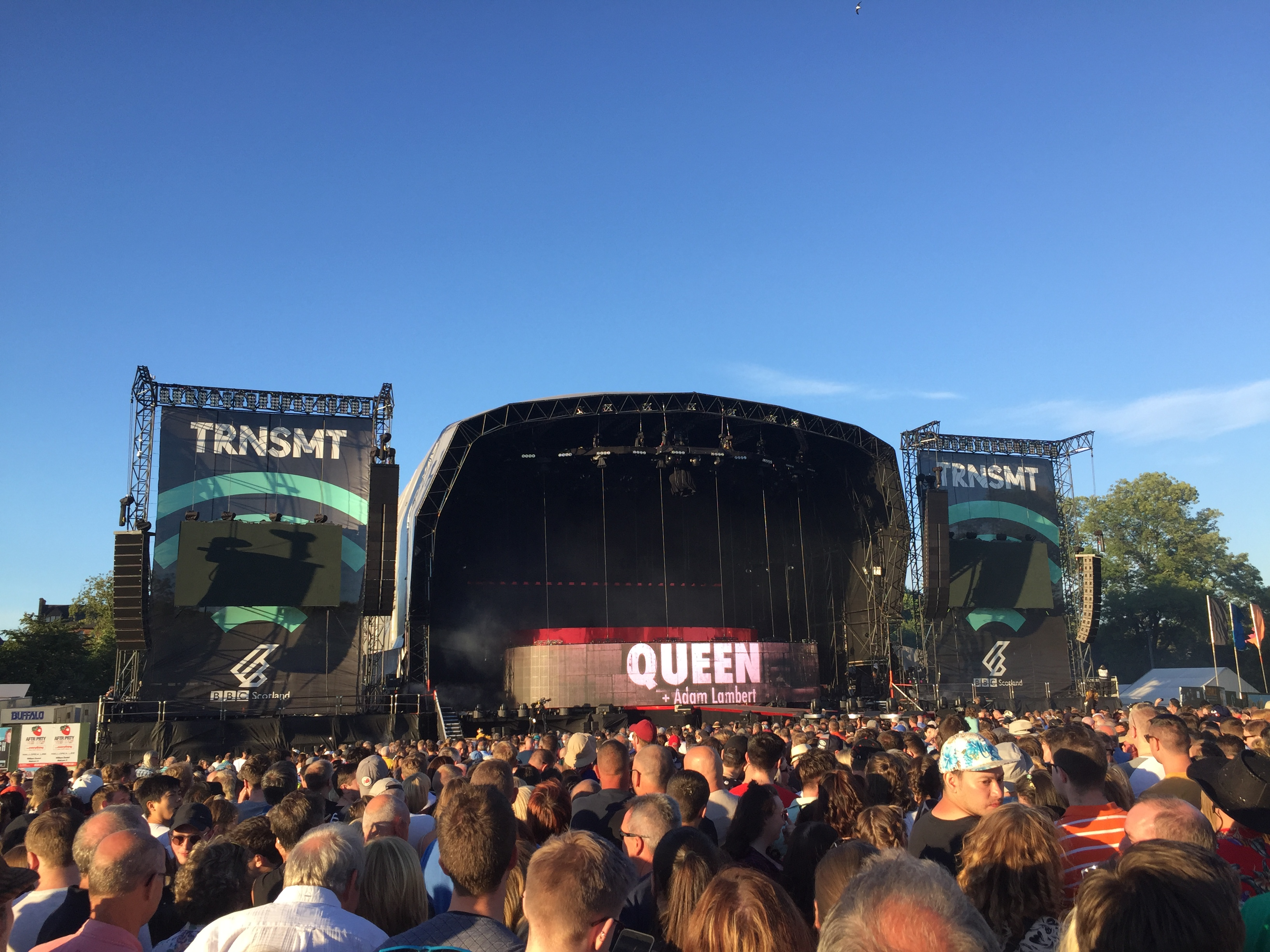
- The Main Stage of the TRNSMT festival at Glasgow Green, Glasgow (2018)
- Genre: Pop, rock, electronica
- Dates: late June/early July
- Locations: Glasgow, Scotland
- Years active: 2017–2019,2022-
- Attendance: 120,000
- Capacity: 50,000
- Website: www.trnsmtfest.com

TRNSMT (pronounced "Transmit") is a music festival staged at Glasgow Green in Glasgow, Scotland, organised by DF Concerts.

== History ==
An early line-up for the first TRNSMT festival was revealed in January 2017, two months after the announcement that T in the Park (also organised by DF Concerts) would not be staged that year. The first festival took place over three days in July 2017 and the organisers said that 120,000 people attended.

Shortly after the first festival concluded, a second event was announced for the following year. In November 2017, the festival organisers announced a change of date. The 2018 event was held over six days, split over two weekends. In 2019 the event returned to being three days covering a single weekend, with a daily capacity of 50,000.

On 24 April 2020, it was announced that the 2020 festival would not go ahead due to the COVID-19 pandemic.

== Awards ==
TRNSMT was named 'best new festival' in December 2017 at the UK Festival Awards in London.

== Criticism ==
The Musicians' Union criticized the 2019 lineup for only 20% of the acts being female. In response the festival announced they would have a female-only 'Queen Tut's' stage. When the first acts were announced for the 2020 festival the head of DF Concerts, Geoff Ellis, defended the lack of female acts announced, saying "we'd love there to be a higher representation of females but there isn't, certainly on the acts we're announcing today, it will be a while until there's a 50/50 balance" and "we need to get more females picking up guitars, forming bands, playing in bands”.

== Headliners ==
For full lineups see TRNSMT festival line-ups

- 2017 – Radiohead, Kasabian, Biffy Clyro
- 2018 – Stereophonics, Liam Gallagher, Arctic Monkeys, Queen + Adam Lambert, The Killers
- 2019 – Stormzy, Catfish and the Bottlemen, George Ezra
- 2021 – Courteeners, Liam Gallagher, The Chemical Brothers
- 2022 – Paolo Nutini, The Strokes, Lewis Capaldi
- 2023 – Pulp, Sam Fender, The 1975
- 2024 – Liam Gallagher, Gerry Cinnamon, Calvin Harris
- 2025 – 50 Cent, Biffy Clyro, Snow Patrol, The Script, Fontaines D.C., Gracie Abrams
- 2026 – Richard Ashcroft, Kasabian, Lewis Capaldi
