= Blossoms discography =

- Studio albums: 6
- EPs: 4
- Compilation albums: 1
- Singles: 21

The English indie pop band Blossoms have released six studio albums, one compilation album and live album, four extended plays and twenty singles. Their debut studio album, Blossoms, was released in August 2016 and peaked at number one on the UK Albums Chart. The album includes the singles "Blow", "Cut Me and I'll Bleed", "Blown Rose", "Charlemagne", "At Most a Kiss", "Getaway", "My Favourite Room" and "Honey Sweet". Their second studio album, Cool Like You, was released in April 2018 and peaked at number four on the UK Albums Chart. The album includes the singles "I Can't Stand It", "There's a Reason Why (I Never Returned Your Calls)" and "How Long Will This Last?". Their third studio album, Foolish Loving Spaces, was released in January 2020. The album includes the singles "Your Girlfriend", "The Keeper" and "If You Think This Is Real Life". Their fourth studio album, Ribbon Around the Bomb, was released in April 2022. The album includes the singles "Care For", "Ribbon Around the Bomb", "Ode to NYC" and "The Sulking Poet". Their fifth studio album, Gary was released in September 2024. The album includes the singles "What Can I Say After I'm Sorry?", "Gary", "Perfect Me", and "I Like Your Look".

== Studio albums ==
Title	Details	Peak chart positions					Sales	Certifications
Title	Details	UK	UK Indie	IRE	NL	SCO	Sales	Certifications
Blossoms	Released: 5 August 2016; Label: Virgin EMI; Formats: Digital download, CD, vinyl, cassette	1	—	12	185	1	UK: 204,313 (Note: United Kingdom sales figures for Blossoms as of October 2026.)	BPI: Gold
Cool Like You	Released: 27 April 2018; Label: Virgin EMI; Formats: Digital download, CD, vinyl, cassette	4	—	46	—	4	UK: 114,602 (Note: United Kingdom sales figures for Cool Like You as of October 2026.)	BPI: Gold
Foolish Loving Spaces	Released: 31 January 2020; Label: Virgin EMI; Formats: Digital download, CD, vinyl, cassette	1	—	67	—	2	UK: 94,428 (Note: United Kingdom sales figures for Foolish Loving Spaces as of October 2026.)	BPI: Silver
Ribbon Around the Bomb	Released: 29 April 2022; Label: Virgin EMI; Formats: Digital download, CD, vinyl, cassette	1	—	—	—	3	UK: 39,535 (Note: United Kingdom sales figures for Ribbon Around the Bomb as of October 2026.)	
Gary	Released: 20 September 2024; Label: ODD SK; Formats: Digital download, CD, vinyl, cassette	1	1	—	—	3	UK: 58,216 (Note: United Kingdom sales figures for Gary as of October 2026.)	
Songs from the Wedding Cake	Released: 2 October 2026; Label: ODD SK; Formats: Digital download, CD, vinyl, cassette	1	1	—	—	2		
"—" denotes an album that did not chart or was not released in that territory.

== Compilation and live albums ==
Title	Details	Peak chart positions	
Title	Details	UK	SCO
Blossoms in Isolation/Live from the Plaza Theatre, Stockport	Released: 23 October 2020; Label: Virgin EMI; Format: Digital download, CD, vinyl, cassette	5	7

== Extended plays ==
Title	Details
Bloom	Released: 12 May 2014; Label: RIP; Format: CD
Blown Rose	Released: 2015; Label: Virgin EMI; Format: 10" vinyl, digital download
Charlemagne	Released: 18 December 2015; Label: Virgin EMI; Format: 10" vinyl, digital download
At Most a Kiss	Released: 2016; Label: Virgin EMI; Format: 10" vinyl, digital download

== Singles ==
=== As lead artist ===
Title	Year	Peak chart positions								Certifications	Album
Title	Year	UK	BEL (FL) Tip	BEL (WA) Tip	EST	FIN Air.	ICE	SCO	SWI Air.	Certifications	Album
"You Pulled a Gun on Me"	2014	— (Note: "You Pulled a Gun on Me" did not enter the UK Singles Chart, but peaked at number 50 on the UK Physical Singles Chart.)	—	—	*	—	—	—	—		Bloom
"Blow"	2014	— (Note: "Blow" did not enter the UK Singles Chart, but peaked at number 12 on the UK Physical Singles Chart.)	—	—	*	—	—	—	—		Blossoms
"Cut Me and I'll Bleed"	2015	— (Note: "Cut Me and I'll Bleed" did not enter the UK Singles Chart, but peaked at number 4 on the UK Physical Singles Chart.)	—	—	*	—	—	—	—		Blossoms
"Blown Rose"	2015	— (Note: "Blown Rose" did not enter the UK Singles Chart, but peaked at number 4 on the UK Physical Singles Chart.)	—	—	*	—	—	—	—		Blossoms
"Charlemagne"	2015	98	— (Note: "Charlemagne" did not enter the Flanders Ultratop Top 50, but charted as an "extra tip" on the Flanders Ultratop Bubbling Under chart.)	— (Note: "Charlemagne" did not enter the Wallonie Ultratop Top 50, but charted as an "extra tip" on the Wallonie Ultratop Bubbling Under chart.)	*	96	—	38	—	BPI: 2x Platinum	Blossoms
"At Most a Kiss"	2016	— (Note: "At Most a Kiss" did not enter the UK Singles Chart, but peaked at number 69 on the UK Singles Downloads Chart.)	— (Note: "At Most a Kiss" did not enter the Flanders Ultratop Top 50, but charted as an "extra tip" on the Flanders Ultratop Bubbling Under chart.)	—	—	—	—	81	—		Blossoms
"Getaway"	2016	— (Note: "Getaway" did not enter the UK Singles Chart, but peaked at number 3 on the UK Physical Singles Chart.)	—	—	—	—	—	—	—	BPI: Silver	Blossoms
"My Favourite Room"	2016	—	—	—	—	—	—	—	—		Blossoms
"Honey Sweet"	2016	—	—	—	—	—	13	—	—	BPI: Gold	Blossoms
"This Moment" (with Chase & Status)	2017	—	—	—	—	—	—	—	—		Tribe
"I Can't Stand It"	2018	77	—	—	—	—	—	60	93	BPI: Silver	Cool Like You
"There's a Reason Why (I Never Returned Your Calls)"	2018	95	—	—	—	—	—	81	—	BPI: Gold	Cool Like You
"How Long Will This Last?"	2018	—	—	—	—	—	—	—	—		Cool Like You
"I've Seen The Future"	2019	—	—	—	—	—	—	—	—		Non-album single
"Your Girlfriend"	2019	100	40	—	—	—	—	59	99	BPI: Platinum	Foolish Loving Spaces
"The Keeper"	2019	— (Note: "The Keeper" did not enter the UK Singles Chart, but peaked at number 100 on the UK Singles Downloads Chart.)	—	—	—	—	—	27	50	BPI: Silver	Foolish Loving Spaces
"If You Think This Is Real Life"	2020	— (Note: "If You Think This Is Real Life" did not enter the UK Singles Chart, but peaked at number 99 on the UK Singles Downloads Chart.)	—	—	—	—	—	—	—		Foolish Loving Spaces
"Christmas Eve (Soul Purpose)"	2020	— (Note: "Christmas Eve (Soul Purpose)" did not enter the UK Singles Chart, but peaked at number 2 on the UK Physical Singles Chart.)	—	—	—	—	—	—	—		Non-album single
"Care For"	2021	—	—	—	—	—	—	*	—		Ribbon Around the Bomb
"Ribbon Around the Bomb"	2022	—	—	—	—	—	—	*	—		Ribbon Around the Bomb
"Ode to NYC"	2022	—	—	—	—	—	—	*	—		Ribbon Around the Bomb
"The Sulking Poet"	2022	—	—	—	—	—	—	*	—		Ribbon Around the Bomb
"To Do List (After the Breakup)" (featuring Findlay)	2023	—	—	—	—	—	—	*	—		Gary
"What Can I Say After I'm Sorry?"	2024	—	—	—	—	—	—	*	—		Gary
"Gary"	2024	— (Note: "Gary" did not enter the UK Singles Chart, but peaked at number 82 on the UK Single Downloads Chart.)	—	—	—	—	—	*	—		Gary
"Perfect Me"	2024	—	—	—	—	—	—	*	—		Gary
"I Like Your Look"	2024	—	—	—	—	—	—	*	—		Gary
"I Wanna Dance with Somebody"	2024	—	—	—	—	—	—	*	—		Gary
"So Hot You're Hurting My Feelings"	2024	—	—	—	—	—	—	*	—		Gary
"Mariah Carey Through Death Valley"	2025	—	—	—	—	—	—	*	—		Gary
"The Honeymoon"	2025	—	—	—	—	—	—	*	—		Gary
"Joke About Divorce"	2026	—	—	—	—	—	—	*	—		Songs from the Wedding Cake
"Meet Me in Love"	2026	—	—	—	73	—	—	*	—		Songs from the Wedding Cake
"Additional Driver" (featuring Declan McKenna)	2026	—	—	—	88	—	—	*	—		Songs from the Wedding Cake
"Husband"	2026	— (Note: "Husband" did not enter the UK Singles Chart, but peaked at number 68 on the UK Single Sales Chart.)	—	—	—	—	—	*	—		Songs from the Wedding Cake
"—" denotes a single that did not chart or was not released in that territory. "*" denotes that the chart did not exist at that time.

== Other charted songs ==
Title	Year	Peak chart positions		Album
Title	Year	EST Air.	JPN Hot	Album
"The Kardashians"	2026	—	16	Songs from the Wedding Cake
"Additional Driver" (Blossoms featuring Declan McKenna)	2026	69	—	Songs from the Wedding Cake
