= Blossoms in Isolation =

Compilation album by Blossoms
- Released: 31 May 2020
- Studio: At home

Blossoms chronology
Foolish Loving Spaces (2020)	Blossoms in Isolation (2020)	Ribbon Around the Bomb (2022)

Blossoms in Isolation is a compilation of cover versions and reworkings of their own songs by the English indie pop band Blossoms, released on 31 May 2020 digitally, with a physical release following on 23 October 2020. It was recorded 'in isolation' during the lockdown imposed by the UK government in response to the COVID-19 pandemic in the United Kingdom.

== Track listing ==
All tracks are written by Tom Ogden, Josh Dewhurst, Charlie Salt, Joe Donovan & Myles Kellock, except where noted.

Blossoms in Isolation track listing
No.	Title	Writer(s)	Length
1.	"Lost"	Christopher Breaux; James Ryan Ho; Micah Otano	3:51
2.	"My Swimming Brain"		3:14
3.	"Paperback Writer"	John Lennon; Paul McCartney	2:19
4.	"There's a Reason Why (I Never Returned Your Calls)"		3:50
5.	"The Less I Know the Better" (featuring Miles Kane)	Kevin Parker	3:41
6.	"If You Think This Is Real Life"		2:43
7.	"Dreaming of You" (featuring James Skelly)	James Skelly	2:19
8.	"Oh No (I Think I'm in Love)"		3:33
9.	"Charlemagne"		2:48
10.	"Your Girlfriend"		2:49
11.	"You're Gorgeous"	Stephen Jones	3:13
12.	"Everyday I Write the Book"	Elvis Costello	3:13
13.	"Please Don't" (featuring Liam Fray)	Liam Fray	3:32
Total length:			40:56

== Charts ==
Chart (2020)	Peak position
UK Albums (OCC)	5

== See also ==
- List of 2020 albums
