= Ribbon Around the Bomb =

Studio album by Blossoms
- Released: 29 April 2022
- Length: 37:09
- Label: Virgin EMI
- Producer: James Skelly; Rich Turvey

Blossoms chronology
Blossoms in Isolation (2020)	Ribbon Around the Bomb (2022)	Gary (2024)

Blossoms studio chronology
Foolish Loving Spaces (2020)	Ribbon Around The Bomb (2022)	Gary (2024)

Singles from Ribbon Around the Bomb
- 1. "Care For" Released: 17 August 2021; 2. "Ribbon Around the Bomb" Released: 25 January 2022; 3. "Ode to NYC" Released: 25 February 2022; 4. "The Sulking Poet" Released: 24 March 2022

Professional ratings
Review scores
Source	Rating
Clash	8/10
Dork	4/5 stars
Evening Standard	4/5 stars
Gigwise	8/10
NME	4/5 stars
Rolling Stone	4/5 stars
The Times	4/5 stars

Ribbon Around the Bomb is the fourth studio album by the English indie pop band Blossoms. It was released on 29 April 2022 by Virgin EMI Records. It was their last album released on Virgin EMI as the band later created their own record label, ODD SK Records.

== Critical reception ==
Ribbon Around the Bomb received positive reviews upon its release. Stephen Ackroyd of Dork praised Blossoms as a "band that don't just connect in the here and now, but who are now making records to last for the long haul." Clash commented that the album was "endearing, prodigiously rich and ambitious" and "might well be their finest body of work to date." Louder Than War described the album as: "Classic, unfussy songwriting, instant hooks abound as the Stockport five-piece produce their most consistent record to date." The Evening Standard gave the album 4/5, praising it by writing: "From ABBA-ish jaunts to NYC odes, the five-piece are sounding rather more worldly". It added: "They're growing up, but haven't lost sight of what makes them so appealing".

NME rated the album 4/5, saying "it's a coming-of-age moment for the band, and there's no question Blossoms have levelled up with this release, sealing their status as giants of the game with more earnest and open songwriting." Gigwise rated the album 8/10, saying: "'Ribbon Around The Bomb' is a grand coming-of-age record. Featuring tight rhythms, compelling pop melodies and thoughtful lyrics, Blossoms signature chiming electric sound has developed in this mature record that puts song-writing at the forefront and solidifies their position as UK indie-pop icons."

Giving the album 8/10, Rolling Stone UK said: "The group have delivered arguably their most introspective effort yet. It dials down on the synths that featured so abundantly before and instead offers a sound that wears a love of classic songwriters proudly on its sleeve." The Times gave the album 4/5, saying: "They have found the music to match the image, taking inspiration from Paul Simon and Harry Nilsson to capture smooth songwriting charm."

== Track listing ==
All tracks are written by Tom Ogden, Josh Dewhurst, Charlie Salt, Joe Donovan, and Myles Kellock, except where noted.

Ribbon Around the Bomb track listing
No.	Title	Writer(s)	Length
1.	"The Writer's Theme"	Ogden; James Skelly	0:35
2.	"Ode to NYC"		2:51
3.	"Ribbon Around the Bomb"		2:34
4.	"The Sulking Poet"		3:34
5.	"Born Wild"		3:42
6.	"The Writer"	Ogden	2:46
7.	"Everything About You"		4:04
8.	"Care For"		2:49
9.	"Cinerama Holy Days"		3:14
10.	"Edith Machinist"		3:12
11.	"Visions"		7:00
12.	"The Last Chapter"	Ogden; Skelly	0:48
Total length:			37:09

Ribbon Around the Bomb (Deluxe Edition) track listing
No.	Title	Writer(s)	Length
1.	"Ode to NYC" (Piano Version)		3:05
2.	"Ribbon Around the Bomb" (Piano Version)		2:42
3.	"The Sulking Poet" (Piano Version)		3:06
4.	"Born Wild" (Piano Version)		3:15
5.	"The Writer" (Piano Version)	Ogden	2:58
6.	"Everything About You" (Piano Version)		4:05
7.	"Care For" (Piano Version)		2:59
8.	"Cinerama Holy Days" (Piano Version)		3:05
9.	"Edith Machinist" (Piano Version)		3:13
10.	"Visions" (Piano Version)		4:39
Total length:			33:07

Ribbon Around the Bomb (Super Deluxe) track listing
No.	Title	Writer(s)	Length
1.	"Intro" (Live at Sefton Park)		1:20
2.	"Your Girlfriend" (Live at Sefton Park)		2:32
3.	"There's a Reason Why (I Never Returned Your Calls)" (Live at Sefton Park)		3:47
4.	"I Can't Stand It" (Live at Sefton Park)		3:54
5.	"Cut Me And I'll Bleed" (Live at Sefton Park)		3:48
6.	"Getaway" (Live at Sefton Park)		2:59
7.	"My Swimming Brain" (Live at Sefton Park)		3:56
8.	"Paperback Writer" (Live at Sefton Park)	Paul McCartney; John Lennon	2:24
9.	"Blown Rose" (Live at Sefton Park)		3:10
10.	"The Keeper" (Live at Sefton Park)		3:58
11.	"Honey Sweet" (Live at Sefton Park)		4:18
12.	"Sunday Was A Friend Of Mine" (Live at Sefton Park)		2:49
13.	"If You Think This Is Real Life" (Live at Sefton Park)		3:35
14.	"Blow" (Live at Sefton Park)		3:37
15.	"Oh No (I Think I'm In Love)" (Live at Sefton Park)		5:43
16.	"At Most A Kiss" (Live at Sefton Park)		4:41
17.	"Charlemagne" (Live at Sefton Park)		3:37
Total length:			1:00:32

== Personnel ==
Blossoms

- Tom Ogden – vocals, acoustic guitar (tracks 2–11); harmonica (2), piano (3, 4, 9, 12), electric guitar (5, 7, 9)
- Josh Dewhurst – acoustic guitar, electric guitar (2–5, 7–11)
- Charlie Salt – bass, background vocals (2–5, 7–11); clavinet (8), acoustic guitar (3,4)
- Joe Donovan – drums (2–5, 7–11)
- Myles Kellock – keyboards (2–5, 7–11)

Additional musicians

- Rosie Danvers – orchestration, cello (1–3, 8, 10, 11)
- Emma Owens – viola (1–3, 8, 10, 11)
- Meghan Cassidy – viola (1–3, 8, 10, 11)
- Ellie Stanford – violin (1–3, 8, 10, 11)
- Hayley Pomfrett – violin (1–3, 8, 10, 11)
- Jenny Sacha – violin (1–3, 8, 10, 11)
- Patrick Kiernan – violin (1–3, 8, 10, 11)
- Zara Benyounes – violin (1–3, 8, 10, 11)
- Fiona Skelly – background vocals (2–5, 7–11)
- Niamh Rowe – background vocals (2–5, 7–11)
- Ian Skelly – percussion (2–5, 7–11)

Technical

- James Skelly – production
- Rich Turvey – production, engineering
- Greg Calbi – mastering
- Craig Silvey – mixing
- Nick Taylor – engineering (1–3, 8, 10, 11)
- TommyD – production assistance (1–3, 8, 10, 11)
- Dani Bennett Spragg – mixing assistance
- Chris Taylor – engineering assistance
- Matthew Watson – engineering assistance
- Nathan Conboy – engineering assistance
- Toby Renwick – engineering assistance
- Will Bennett – engineering assistance

== Charts ==
Chart performance for Ribbon Around the Bomb
Chart (2022)	Peak position
Scottish Albums (OCC)	3
UK Albums (OCC)	1
