= Gary (Blossoms song) =

2024 song by Blossoms

Single by Blossoms

from the album Gary
- Released: 3 June 2024
- Recorded: 2024
- Length: 2:30
- Label: ODD SK Recordings
- Songwriters: Charlie Salt; Tom Ogden; Josh Dewhurst; Joe Donovan; Myles Kellock
- Producer: James Skelly

Blossoms singles chronology
"What Can I Say After I'm Sorry" (2024)	"Gary" (2024)	"Perfect Me" (2024)

"Gary" is a song performed by the English indie pop band Blossoms. The song was released on 3 June 2024 through their independent label ODD SK Recordings as the second single from their fifth studio album of the same name. The song centres around the events of a fibreglass gorilla of the same name being stolen from a garden centre in Carluke, Scotland in 2023.

== Background and composition ==
A replica of Gary the fibreglass gorilla

The song is based on a true story that frontman Tom Ogden heard on the radio in 2023, where an 8-foot fibreglass gorilla was stolen from Reynard Garden Centre in Carluke, Scotland. Ogden explained, "I found the story entertaining when I heard it on the radio, so just as a laugh I went away [and said] I'm going to write a song about it."

== Music video ==
The music video was released alongside the single. Directed by Tom Ogden and his brother Ewan, it follows the events of the previous music video for "What Can I Say After I'm Sorry?", recreating the events of Gary the 8-foot fibreglass gorilla being stolen from the garden centre. Alongside the band members, the music video stars Rick Astley as Andrew Scott, the owner of the garden centre, and Sean Dyche as a crime boss. The video was shot on 16mm film, and was filmed in various locations around Stockport, the Peak District and Derbyshire.

== Personnel ==
Credits are adapted from Tidal.

Blossoms

- Tom Ogden – lead vocals, guitar
- Joe Donovan – drums, percussion
- Charlie Salt – bass, backing vocals
- Josh Dewhurst – lead guitar, percussion
- Myles Kellock – keyboards

Additional contributors

- James Skelly – production
- Matt Colton – mastering
- David Wrench – mixing

== Charts ==
Chart (2024)	Peak position
UK Singles Downloads (Official Charts)	82
