= I Can't Stand It =

I Can't Stand It may refer to:

- "I Can't Stand It" (Eric Clapton song), 1981
- "I Can't Stand It" (Blossoms song), 2018
- "I Can't Stand It!", a song by Twenty 4 Seven
- "I Can't Stand It", a song by The Specials from their album More Specials, featuring Rhoda Dakar
- "I Can't Stand It (The Chambers Brothers song), a 1968 song by The Chambers Brothers
- "I Can't Stand It", a song by the Spencer Davis Group from Their First LP
- "I Can't Stand It", a song by the Velvet Underground from their album VU

== See also ==
- "I Can't Stand Myself (When You Touch Me)", song by James Brown
