= Stockport Town Hall =

Municipal building in Stockport, Greater Manchester, England

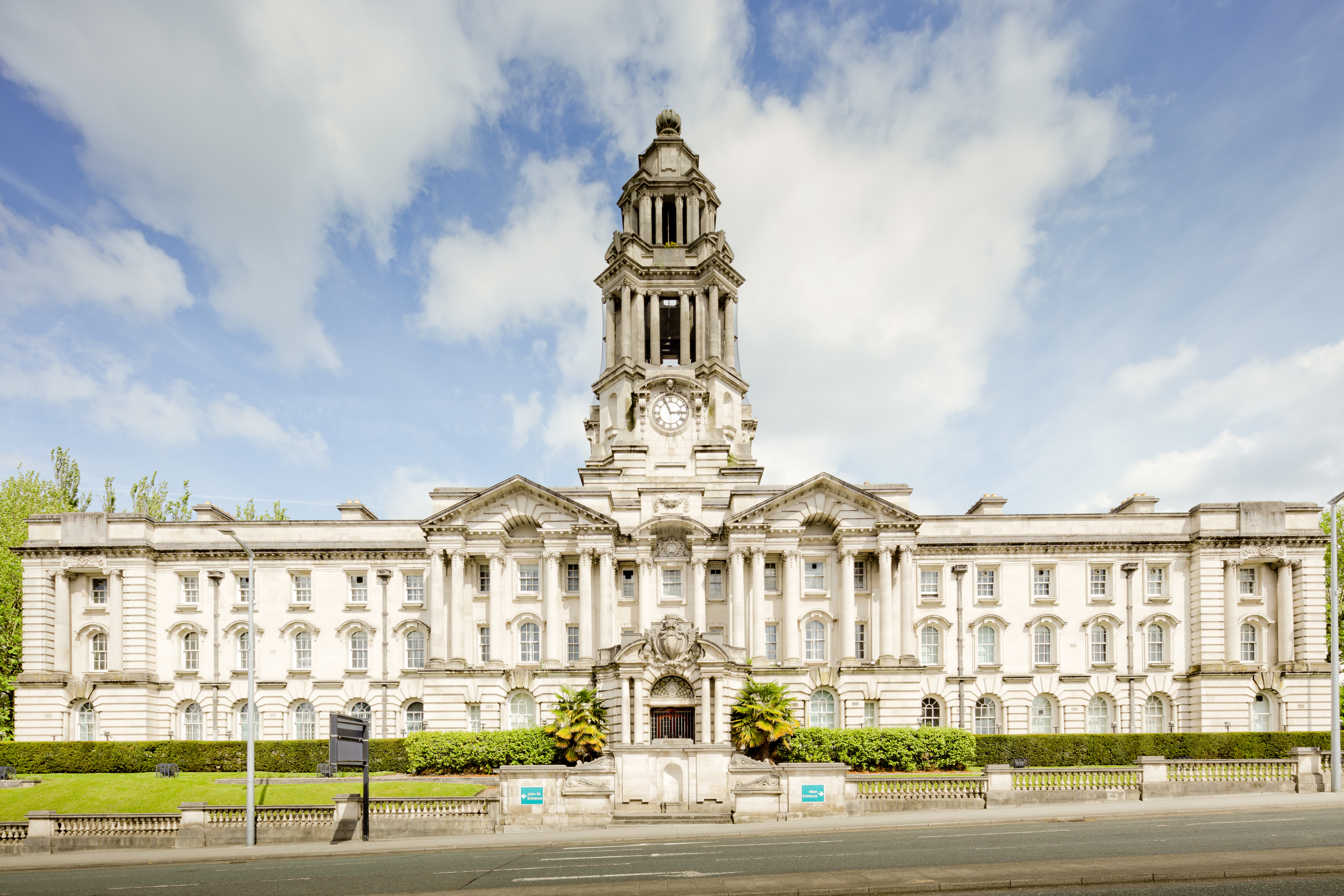
- Stockport Town Hall, 2022

General information
- Architectural style: English Baroque style
- Location: Stockport, Greater Manchester, England
- Coordinates: 53°24′21″N 2°9′31″W
- Inaugurated: 1908
- Owner: Stockport Metropolitan Borough Council (SMBC)

Height
- Height: 40 m (130 ft)

Design and construction
- Architect: Brumwell Thomas

Listed Building – Grade II*
- Official name: Town Hall
- Designated: 10 March 1975
- Reference no.: 1067166

Stockport Town Hall is a building in Stockport, Greater Manchester, England, that houses the government and administrative functions of Stockport Metropolitan Borough Council (SMBC). Stockport Town Hall is a Grade II* listed building.

== History ==
The building, which was designed by the architect Brumwell Thomas in the English Baroque style, was opened by the then Prince and Princess of Wales on 7 July 1908. To commemorate the Royal visit, part of Heaton Lane, a main shopping street in the town, was renamed Prince's Street.

The ballroom in the town hall served as a hospital during the First World War and was used as a home for refugees from the Channel Islands during the Second World War, after they had been occupied by Nazi Germany for most of the war.

The town hall, which had served as the headquarters of the county borough of Stockport for much of the 20th century, continued to be the local seat of government after the enlarged Stockport Metropolitan Borough Council (SMBC) was formed in 1974.

== Description ==
The chamber is decorated with elaborate plasterwork, brass chandeliers and decorative carvings on oak benches. The civic collection of silver, some of which dates from the 15th century, lines the wall of the corridor outside the chamber.

An imposing Italian marble entrance leads to the Edwardian ballroom, which former Poet Laureate Sir John Betjeman described as "magnificent".

The ballroom has a Wurlitzer Publix One theatre organ with four manuals and 20 ranks of pipes, specified by American pianist and organist Jesse Crawford. It was originally installed in the Paramount Cinema on Oxford Road in Manchester in 1930; it had been planned to install one of these in each of the 50 Paramount theatres, however this was the only one to be installed, and the only one of that model to leave the United States. When the theatre was divided, the organ was acquired by the Lancastrian Theatre Organ Trust, loaned to the city of Manchester and relocated to the Free Trade Hall (a process taking four years); and was first used there in September 1977. When the Free Trade Hall closed, it was moved to Stockport Town Hall in 1999.

The town hall, which as the home of Stockport Symphony Orchestra, hosts classical concerts on a regular basis, has been nicknamed "the wedding cake". Blossoms' sixth studio album Songs from the Wedding Cake (2026) was named after the town hall, in which frontman Tom Ogden got married in 2021.

== Gallery ==
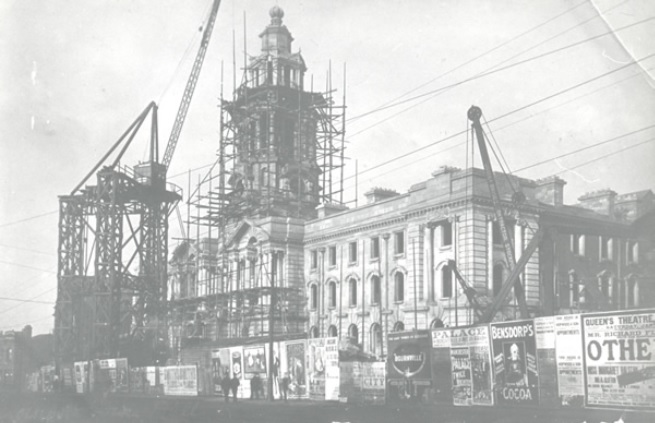
Stockport Town Hall under construction, c. 1907

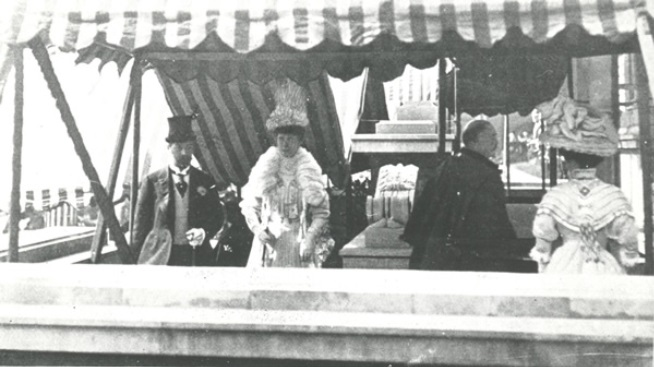
The Prince and Princess of Wales at the opening of Stockport Town Hall, 1908

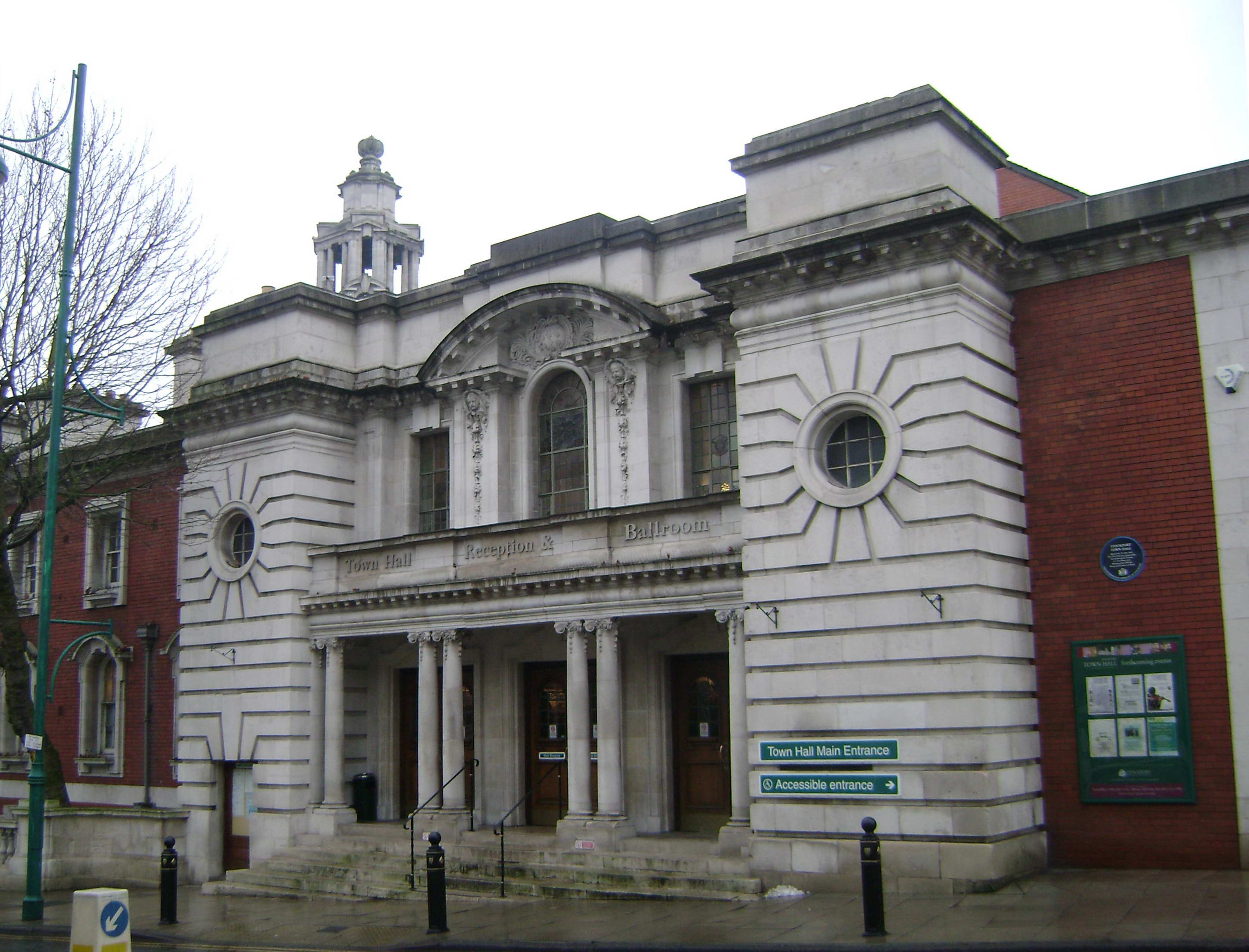
Stockport Town Hall, main entrance, 2009

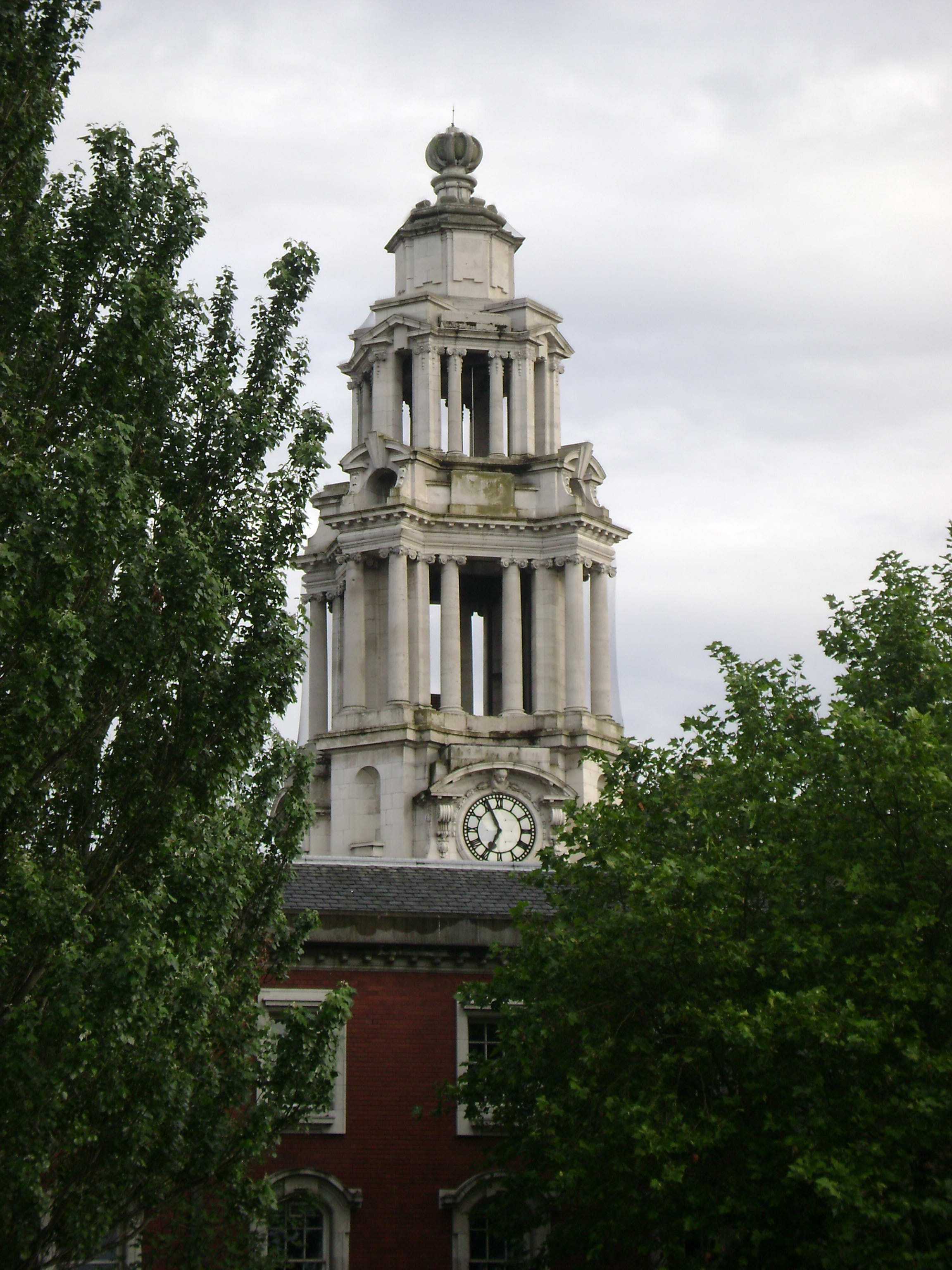
Stockport Town Hall, 2009

== See also ==
- Grade II* listed buildings in Greater Manchester
- Listed buildings in Stockport
