= Gary (album) =

Studio album by Blossoms
- Released: 20 September 2024
- Genres: Indie rock; pop rock
- Length: 30:22
- Label: ODD SK Recordings
- Producers: James Skelly; Josh Lloyd-Watson

Blossoms chronology
Ribbon Around the Bomb (2022)	Gary (2024)	Songs from the Wedding Cake (2026)

Singles from Gary
- 1. "What Can I Say After I'm Sorry?" Released: 1 May 2024; 2. "Gary" Released: 3 June 2024; 3. "Perfect Me" Released: 23 July 2024; 4. "I Like Your Look" Released: 19 September 2024

Singles from Deluxe Edition
- 1. "To Do List (After The Breakup)" Released: 9 October 2023; 2. "Mariah Carey Through Death Valley" Released: 28 February 2025; 3. "The Honeymoon" Released: 31 March 2025

Singles from Covers Edition
- 1. "I Wanna Dance With Somebody" Released: 25 October 2024; 2. "So Hot You're Hurting My Feelings" Released: 22 November 2024

Professional ratings
Review scores
Source	Rating
Clash	8/10
Dork	4/5 stars
Rolling Stone	4/5 stars

Gary is the fifth studio album by the English indie pop band Blossoms. It was released on 20 September 2024 through ODD SK Recordings. The album was supported by the singles "What Can I Say After I'm Sorry?", "Gary", "Perfect Me" and "I Like Your Look". The album and title track were named after a fibreglass gorilla statue of the same name, which was stolen from a garden centre in Lanarkshire, Scotland in 2023.

It debuted atop the UK Albums Chart, becoming the band's fourth UK number-one album, with 21,884 copies sold in its first week in the UK. The album also debuted atop the UK's Vinyl Albums Chart and Record Store Chart, and was noted for having 86% of its total debut sales coming from physical formats.

== Background ==
For this album, the band decided to record the album live, as opposed to rehearsing in the studio and recording bit-by-bit, as the band felt like they were finally good enough to do so. The writing process was also different, with half of the songs being more collaborative, as opposed to Tom Ogden writing the songs himself before bringing them to the band.

A replica of Gary the fibreglass gorilla

While the majority of the album was produced by James Skelly of The Coral, this was the first Blossoms album to feature another producer, with Josh-Lloyd Watson from Jungle producing the tracks "What Can I Say After I'm Sorry" and "Nightclub".

In 2023, the band rented out an Airbnb in Wales to do some songwriting, which CMAT joined them for. The tracks "I Like Your Look" and "Why Do I Give You The Worst Of Me?" emerged from these sessions.

== Release and promotion ==
The album was announced on 3 June 2024, alongside the track listing and a promotional video with Gary Lineker, Gary Neville & Gary Numan. The title track was released at the same time as the announcement, alongside a music video starring Rick Astley & Sean Dyche.

The band performed "Perfect Me" and "What Can I Say After I'm Sorry?" on Later... with Jools Holland, broadcast on 19 October 2024, and performed "Gary" on the Graham Norton Show, broadcast on 25 October 2024.

Alongside the main album, two physical-only special editions were released. One was a deluxe edition featuring nine bonus tracks. The other was "Gary's Covers", featuring renditions of songs by Whitney Houston, The Real Thing, Radiohead, Mario, Neil Diamond, Caroline Polachek, Lady Gaga, and Bob Marley. "I Wanna Dance with Somebody" and "So Hot You're Hurting My Feelings" were released as subsequent singles digitally. "Gary's Covers" later saw a full digital release on 20 December 2024. On 28 February 2025, "Mariah Carey Through Death Valley" was released as the lead single of a forthcoming digital release of the deluxe edition.

== Track listing ==
All tracks are written by Tom Ogden, Josh Dewhurst, Charlie Salt, Joe Donovan & Myles Kellock, except where noted. All tracks are produced by James Skelly, except where noted.

Gary track listing
No.	Title	Writer(s)	Producer(s)	Length
1.	"Big Star"			3:15
2.	"What Can I Say After I'm Sorry?"		Josh Lloyd-Watson; Skelly	2:48
3.	"Gary"			2:30
4.	"I Like Your Look"	Ogden; Dewhurst; Salt; Donovan; Kellock; Ciara Mary-Alice Thompson	Blossoms; Thompson; Skelly	2:56
5.	"Nightclub"		Lloyd-Watson; Skelly	3:01
6.	"Perfect Me"			3:10
7.	"Mothers"			3:32
8.	"Cinnamon"			2:44
9.	"Slow Down"			3:37
10.	"Why Do I Give You the Worst of Me?"	Ogden; Dewhurst; Salt; Donovan; Kellock; Thompson		2:49
Total length:				30:22

Deluxe Edition bonus track listing
No.	Title	Writer(s)	Producer(s)	Length
1.	"The Honeymoon"			3:08
2.	"To Do List (After the Breakup) [Feat. Findlay]"	Ogden; Dewhurst; Salt; Donovan; Kellock; Rupi Kaur		3:15
3.	"Amsterdam in the Rain"		Blossoms	3:48
4.	"Get Happy"		Blossoms	3:23
5.	"Mariah Carey Through Death Valley"			2:47
6.	"Edwyn & Roddy"	Ogden; Dewhurst; Salt; Donovan; Kellock; Thompson	Blossoms	4:51
7.	"Me vs Me"		Blossoms	3:07
8.	"Television"			2:12
9.	"L Is for Love"	Ogden	Ogden	2:00
Total length:				28:31

Covers Edition track listing
No.	Title	Original artist	Length
1.	"I Wanna Dance With Somebody"	Whitney Houston	3:50
2.	"You To Me Are Everything"	The Real Thing	3:09
3.	"Thinking About You"	Radiohead	2:37
4.	"Let Me Love You"	Mario	3:49
5.	"Cracklin' Rosie"	Neil Diamond	3:28
6.	"So Hot You're Hurting My Feelings"	Caroline Polachek	2:58
7.	"Telephone"	Lady Gaga	3:17
8.	"Waiting in Vain"	Bob Marley	4:20
Total length:			27:22

Deluxe Edition with Live Tracks From Wythenshawe Park track listing
No.	Title	Length
1.	"What Can I Say After I'm Sorry" (Live from Wythenshawe Park)	3:08
2.	"The Keeper" (Live from Wythenshawe Park)	4:05
3.	"Care For" (Live from Wythenshawe Park)	2:55
4.	"Honey Sweet" (Live from Wythenshawe Park)	3:50
5.	"If You Think This Is Real Life" (Live from Wythenshawe Park)	4:20
6.	"My Swimming Brain" (Live from Wythenshawe Park)	4:32
7.	"Gary" (Live from Wythenshawe Park)	3:48
8.	"There's a Reason Why (I Never Returned Your Calls)" (Live from Wythenshawe Park)	5:46

== Personnel ==
Blossoms

- Tom Ogden – lead vocals, guitar
- Joe Donovan – drums, percussion
- Charlie Salt – bass, backing vocals
- Josh Dewhurst – lead guitar, percussion
- Myles Kellock – keyboards

Additional contributors

- James Skelly – production (all tracks)
- Robin Dewhurst – keyboards (7)
- Ciara Mary-Alice Thompson – vocals (4)
- Josh Lloyd-Watson – keyboards (5)
- Matt Colton – mastering (all tracks)
- David Wrench – mixing (all tracks)

== Charts ==
Chart performance for Gary
Chart (2024)	Peak position
Scottish Albums (Official Charts)	3
UK Albums (Official Charts)	1
UK Independent Albums (Official Charts)	1
