= I Can't Stand It (Blossoms song) =

Single by Blossoms

from the album Cool Like You
- Released: 1 March 2018
- Length: 2:57
- Label: Virgin EMI
- Songwriters: Tom Ogden; Josh Dewhurst; Joe Donovan; Myles Kellock; Charlie Salt
- Producers: James Skelly; Richard Turvey

Blossoms singles chronology
| "This Moment" (2017) | "I Can't Stand It" (2018) | "There's a Reason Why (I Never Returned Your Calls)" (2018) |

"I Can't Stand It" is a song performed by the English rock band Blossoms. The song was released as a single in the United Kingdom on 1 March 2018 by Virgin EMI Records as the lead single from their second studio album Cool Like You. The song has peaked at number 77 on the UK Singles Chart and number 60 on the Scottish Singles Chart.

Andrew Trendell of NME described the track as a "rush of bittersweet melancholic pop, as if Brett Anderson were fronting OMD".

== Background ==
Speaking to Radio X, Tom Ogden said: "We've got a new single out today, so the all-round vibe with the band is good. We're excited about that." Speaking to NME, Ogden said, "In the end, we recorded it in 21 days or something like that, but over the course of maybe 4 months. We looked back at how can we improve ourselves, before we realised that we’ve gotta take our live setup up another level and have some more upbeat songs."

== Music video ==
A music video to accompany the release of "I Can't Stand It" was first released onto YouTube on 9 March 2018. When talking about the video, Tom Ogden said, "The video was inspired by the film Eternal Sunshine of The Spotless Mind. I’m undergoing a procedure to erase memories of a former love."

== Track listing ==
Digital download - Remixes
| No. | Title | Length |
|---|---|---|
| 1. | "I Can't Stand It" (Hi, I’m Claude Remix) | 4:49 |
| 2. | "I Can't Stand It" (Bodhi Remix) | 6:21 |

== Charts ==
| Chart (2018) | Peak position |
|---|---|
| Scottish Singles Sales (Official Charts) | 60 |
| UK Singles (Official Charts) | 77 |

== Release history ==
| Region | Date | Format | Label |
|---|---|---|---|
| United Kingdom | 1 March 2018 | Digital download; streaming | Virgin EMI Records |
