= Songs from the Wedding Cake =

Studio album by Blossoms
- Released: 2 October 2026
- Recorded: 2026
- Studio: Tilehouse (Denham, Buckinghamshire)
- Length: 42:53
- Labels: Distiller; ODD SK
- Producer: Shawn Lee

Blossoms chronology
Gary (2024)	Songs from the Wedding Cake (2026)

Singles from Songs from the Wedding Cake
- 1. "Joke About Divorce" Released: 20 April 2026; 2. "Meet Me in Love" Released: 15 June 2026; 3. "Additional Driver" Released: 25 August 2026; 4. "Husband" Released: 17 September 2026

Songs from the Wedding Cake is the sixth studio album by the English indie pop band Blossoms. It was released on 2 October 2026 through ODD SK Recordings and Distiller Records. The album is supported by the singles "Joke About Divorce", "Meet Me in Love", "Additional Driver", and "Husband", the latter of which features on the soundtrack of EA Sports FC 27. It peaked at number one on the UK Albums Chart.

== Background and recording ==
The album was recorded at Tilehouse Studios and produced by Shawn Lee, who lead guitarist Josh Dewhurst had contacted online when he was 13 years old, due to being a fan of Lee's work on the soundtrack for the Rockstar Games' video game Bully (2006).

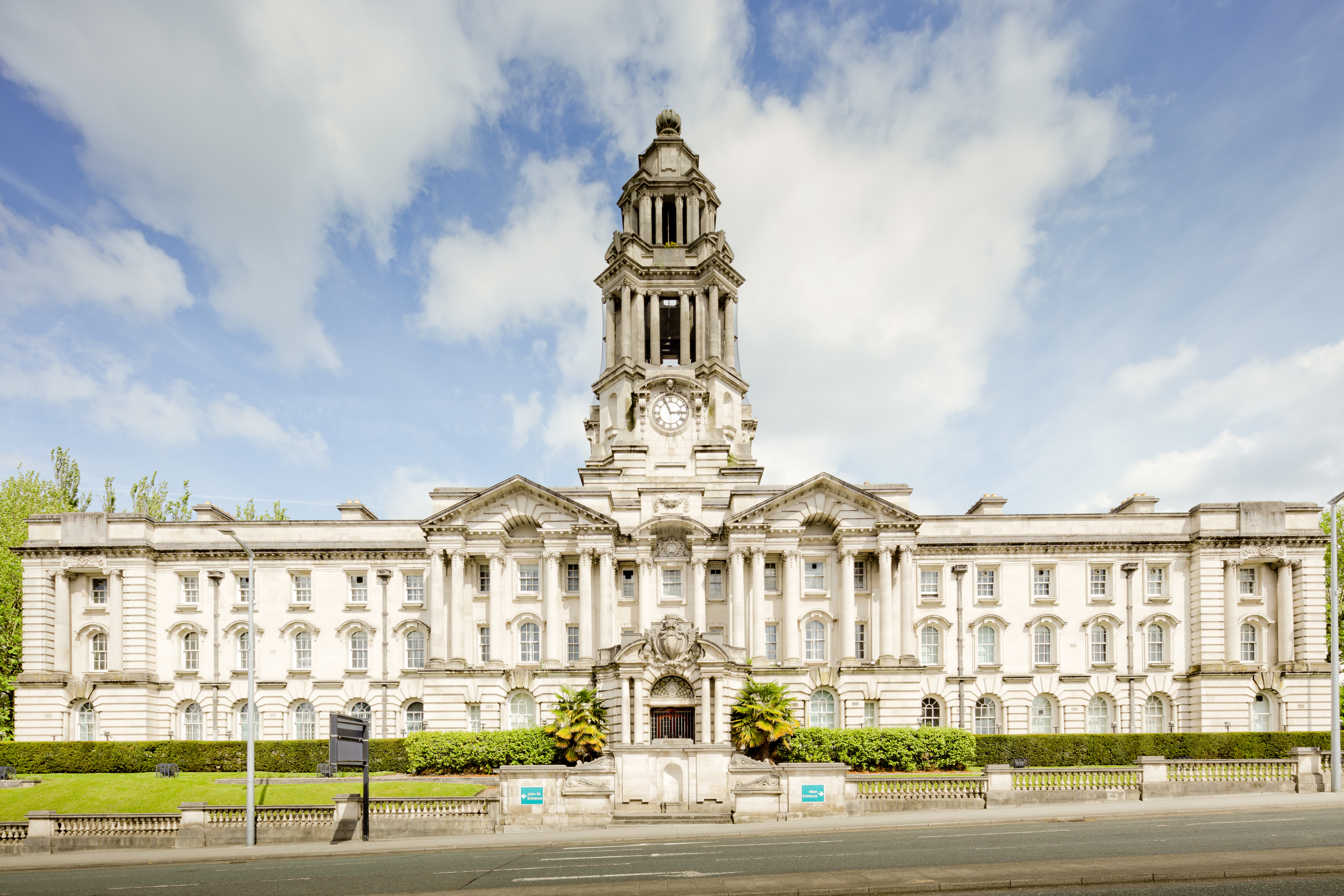
Stockport Town Hall, nicknamed "the wedding cake", which the album is named after

The album takes its name from Stockport Town Hall, which is nicknamed "the wedding cake", where lead vocalist Tom Ogden had got married in 2021.

Similar to the last album Gary, the band stayed in an AirBnb in Anglesey with Declan McKenna for a week to write. The song "Additional Driver" emerged from these sessions, which was recorded in a hot tub. The band went on a songwriting trip to the Lake District with Natalie Findlay and Jules Apollinaire, where they wrote the songs "Meet Me In Love" and "Guts".

== Release and promotion ==
On 20 April 2026, the lead single "Joke About Divorce" was premiered on BBC Radio 1, alongside a music video starring Callum Scott Howells and Rick Astley, who also performs vocals on the track. On 15 June 2026, the second single "Meet Me In Love" was also premiered on Radio 1, with its music video starring Howells, Maya Jama and Declan McKenna, who performs backing vocals on the track.

On 18 June 2026, the band posted an announcement video for the album starring James Buckley, which revealed the album title and cover art. The track listing was also revealed, alongside dates for the band's first ever arena tour, including dates at Manchester's Co-op Live and London's Alexandra Palace, with support from The Royston Club. The band also teased appearances from Rick Astley and Inhaler's Elijah Hewson on the album.

In the days following the announcement, the band crashed three weddings across the north-west, where they rocked up in a van to play short sets. After the final wedding, the band showed up outside 42's Nightclub in Manchester to play a set.

Two more singles followed. On 27 August 2026, the third single "Additional Driver" premiered on Radio 1, featuring Declan McKenna. On 17 September 2026, the final single "Husband" was also premiered on Radio 1, alongside a music video starring Jack O'Connell.

The album's release was marked with a pop-up shop in Stockport selling exclusive merchandise, which generated massive queues of fans.

The band performed "Husband" on The Graham Norton Show, broadcast on 2 October 2026. They also appeared on Saturday Night Live UK on 24 October 2026, performing "Charlemagne" and "Joke About Divorce".

== Track listing ==
All lyrics are written by Thomas Ogden; all music is composed by Ogden, Joshua Dewhurst, Joseph Donovan, Myles Kellock, and Charles Salt, with additional composers noted.

Songs from the Wedding Cake track listing
No.	Title	Writer(s)	Length
1.	"Joke About Divorce"		4:15
2.	"Husband"		3:56
3.	"Meet Me in Love"	Jules Apollinaire; Natalie Findlay	4:02
4.	"The Kardashians"		4:05
5.	"Additional Driver" (featuring Declan McKenna)	Declan McKenna	5:12
6.	"Fall into You"		4:06
7.	"Guts"	Apollinaire; Findlay	3:51
8.	"Uma Thurman"		2:47
9.	"Where Have You Been My Whole Life?"		4:00
10.	"The Deep End"		6:39
Total length:			42:53

Deluxe edition bonus track listing
No.	Title	Writer(s)	Length
11.	"Joke About Divorce" (extended)
12.	"Meet Me in Love" (extended)	Apollinaire; Findlay
13.	"The Kardashians" (extended)
14.	"Additional Driver" (extended; featuring Declan McKenna)	McKenna

Digital Deluxe Download track listing
No.	Title	Length
11.	"Joke About Divorce" (Live at the Deaf Institute)
12.	"Meet Me in Love" (Live at the Deaf Institute)
13.	"Additional Driver" (Live at the Deaf Institute; featuring Declan McKenna)
14.	"Joke About Divorce" (String Quartet version)
15.	"Husband" (String Quartet version)
16.	"Meet Me in Love" (String Quartet version)
17.	"Fall into You" (String Quartet version)
18.	"The Deep End" (String Quartet version)

Live at The Deaf Institute bonus tracks
No.	Title	Length
1.	"Charlemagne" (Live at the Deaf Institute)
2.	"At Most A Kiss" (Live at the Deaf Institute)
3.	"Getaway" (Live at the Deaf Institute)
4.	"Honey Sweet" (Live at the Deaf Institute)
5.	"Onto Her Bed" (Live at the Deaf Institute)
6.	"Texia" (Live at the Deaf Institute)
7.	"Blown Rose" (Live at the Deaf Institute)
8.	"Smashed Pianos" (Live at the Deaf Institute)
9.	"Cut Me And I’ll Bleed" (Live at the Deaf Institute)
10.	"My Favourite Room" (Live at the Deaf Institute)
11.	"Blow" (Live at the Deaf Institute)
12.	"Deep Grass" (Live at the Deaf Institute)
13.	"You Pulled A Gun On Me" (Live at the Deaf Institute)
14.	"Madeleine" (Live at the Deaf Institute)
15.	"Across The Moor" (Live at the Deaf Institute)

== Personnel ==
Credits are adapted from Tidal.

=== Blossoms ===
- Tom Ogden – lead vocals, background vocals (all tracks); acoustic guitar (tracks 1–4, 7, 9), clapping (1, 2, 4), electric guitar (1, 2, 5), piano (1, 4, 10), electric piano (4, 10)
- Charlie Salt – bass guitar, background vocals (all tracks); clapping (1, 2, 4), electric guitar (10)
- Josh Dewhurst – electric guitar (all tracks), percussion (1, 2, 8), clapping (1, 2), acoustic guitar (2, 3, 7, 8), electric piano (3), background vocals (5)
- Joe Donovan – drums (all tracks), clapping (1, 2, 4), background vocals (5)
- Myles Kellock – clapping (1, 2, 4), piano (1, 2, 7, 9), keyboards (1), electric piano (2–10), glockenspiel (4, 9, 10); background vocals, sound effects (5); vibraphone (10)

=== Additional contributors ===
- Shawn Lee – production, mixing, percussion, background vocals (all tracks); acoustic guitar (1, 3, 10), clapping (2, 4), electric guitar (4, 6, 8–10), electric piano (4), synthesizer (8)
- Luke Oldfield – engineering (all tracks), electric guitar (9)
- Pierre Duplan – mixing, additional engineering (3–10)
- Andrea De Bernardi – mastering
- Rick Astley – background vocals (1)
- Declan McKenna – background vocals (3, 5); lead vocals, electric guitar, percussion (5)
- Natalie Findlay – production, background vocals (3, 7); electric piano (3)
- Jules Apollinaire – production, electric guitar, electric piano (3, 7); bass guitar (3), spoken word (7)
- John Simm – additional engineering (5)
- Robin Dewhurst – electric piano (8); organ, piano (10)
- Elijah Hewson – lead vocals (9)

== Charts ==
Chart performance for Songs from the Wedding Cake
Chart (2026)	Peak position
Irish Independent Albums (IRMA)	16
Scottish Albums (Official Charts)	2
UK Albums (Official Charts)	1
UK Independent Albums (Official Charts)	1
