= Blossoms (album) =

Studio album by Blossoms
- Released: 5 August 2016
- Recorded: 2014–15
- Genre: Indie rock; pop
- Length: 40:01
- Label: Virgin EMI
- Producer: James Skelly; Rich Turvey

Blossoms chronology
At Most a Kiss (2016)	Blossoms (2016)	Cool Like You (2018)

Singles from Blossoms
- 1. "Blow" Released: 26 August 2014; 2. "Cut Me and I'll Bleed" Released: 19 January 2015; 3. "Blown Rose" Released: 22 July 2015; 4. "Charlemagne" Released: 5 October 2015; 5. "At Most a Kiss" Released: 5 January 2016; 6. "Getaway" Released: 13 April 2016; 7. "My Favourite Room" Released: 30 June 2016; 8. "Honey Sweet" Released: 5 August 2016

Blossoms is the debut studio album by the English rock band Blossoms. It was released in the United Kingdom on 5 August 2016, by Virgin EMI Records. The album was produced by James Skelly and Rich Turvey. It peaked at number 1 on the UK Albums Chart and number 12 on the Irish Albums Chart, reaching Silver certification in the UK in April 2017. Then in June 2017 it went Gold in the UK after surpassing 100,000 sales.

== Singles ==
"Blow" was released as the lead single from the album on 26 August 2014. "Cut Me and I'll Bleed" was released as the second single from the album on 19 January 2015. "Blown Rose" was released as the third single from the album on 22 July 2015. "Charlemagne" was released as the fourth single from the album on 5 October 2015. The song peaked to number 98 on the UK Singles Chart and number 38 on the Scottish Singles Chart in August 2016. "At Most a Kiss" was released as the fifth single from the album on 5 January 2016. "Getaway" was released as the sixth single from the album on 13 April 2016. "My Favourite Room" was released as the seventh single from the album on 30 June 2016. "Honey Sweet" was released as the eighth single from the album on 5 August 2016.

== Critical reception ==
Professional ratings
Aggregate scores
Source	Rating
Metacritic	71/100
Review scores
Source	Rating
AllMusic	3.5/5 stars
The Independent	4/5 stars
NME	4/5 stars
The Guardian	3/5 stars
The Daily Telegraph	3/5 stars

The album received generally positive reviews from critics. At Metacritic, which assigns a normalized rating out of 100 to reviews from mainstream publications, the album received an average score of 71, based on 10 reviews. Reviewing for AllMusic, Neil Z. Yeung comments, "Blossoms' self-titled first effort sounds less like a debut and more like a greatest-hits album from a veteran group. Years in the making, Blossoms is indeed a compilation of sorts, culling eight of twelve songs from the Stockport band's multiple EPs, which were released as early as 2013. Overall, Blossoms is a strong debut that distills the best of the quintet's diverse influences into a catchy amalgam that opts to shoot for the mainstream rather than stick to the same old sound." Reviewing for The Daily Telegraph, Neil McCormick comments, "Of course, a little nonsense never bothered Blossoms’ Manchester idols Stone Roses or Oasis, but they carried the spirit of the times into their anthemic singalongs. It is as if Blossoms are so intent on being heard in an environment hostile to guitars, they've lost sight of the kind of deeper convictions that actually sets a great rock band apart from the pop hordes. There's plenty to applaud on a promising debut, but, as yet, not enough to believe in."

Reviewing for The Independent, Andy Gill comments, "Stockport’s Blossoms have been acclaimed as saviours of indie-pop for so long now that this debut album is in effect a singles compilation: no fewer than eight of its dozen songs have been singles – though for all their iTunes presence, none has threatened the actual charts. Which is a problem, especially when they involve such sparkling melodies and seemingly blue-chip hooks as the lovely “Charlemagne” and “At Most A Kiss”, the former's nimbly scuttling guitar effortlessly balanced by the latter's lollopy, rolling boogie. Wreathed in mellotron, vibrato guitar and ghostly backing vocals, several songs evoke the windswept psych-pop of The Coral, whose singer James Skelly co-produces Blossoms. But whether the group can straddle the divide between indie cred and chart success remains to be seen." Reviewing for NME, Mark Beaumont comments, "Enter Stockport five-piece Blossoms – this year's biggest guitar-pop shooting stars, named after a pub and looking like snake-hipped garage rockers from the wrong side of Scarysex Central – occasionally sounding like Ellie Goulding. Tipped for greatness by the BBC Sound of 2016 poll, they’re cunningly making a stealth assault on chart territory. Ultimately, Blossoms leap from their chart-bound Trojan horse as modernist rock heroes."

=== Accolades ===
Publication	Accolade	Year	Rank
NME	NME's Albums of the Year 2016	2016	25

== Commercial performance ==
On 8 August 2016, the album was at number one on The Official Chart Update, 7,000 combined sales ahead of Giggs' album, Landlord. On 11 August 2016 the album entered the Irish Albums Chart at number 12. On 12 August 2016, the album entered the UK Albums Chart at number one, 9,500 copies ahead of their nearest rival Giggs. Speaking to the Official Charts Company the band said "We're absolutely made up that the album has gone to Number 1. From the scaffolding yard to the top of the charts, who'd have thought it? Viva Stockport!". The album also reached number one on the Scottish Albums Chart. The following week, the album sold fewer than 8,000 copies, the lowest weekly sale for a UK number one album in modern times.

== Track listing ==
All tracks are written by Tom Ogden, Josh Dewhurst, Charlie Salt, Joe Donovan & Myles Kellock

No.	Title	Length
1.	"Charlemagne"	2:46
2.	"At Most a Kiss"	2:58
3.	"Getaway"	2:59
4.	"Honey Sweet"	3:35
5.	"Onto Her Bed"	2:35
6.	"Texia"	3:27
7.	"Blown Rose"	3:10
8.	"Smashed Pianos"	3:18
9.	"Cut Me and I’ll Bleed"	3:20
10.	"My Favourite Room"	3:30
11.	"Blow"	3:38
12.	"Deep Grass"	4:45
Total length:		40:01

Extended edition
No.	Title	Length
13.	"Winter's Kiss"	3:49
14.	"Madeleine"	3:29
15.	"Smoke"	4:35
16.	"Stormy"	2:33
17.	"Across the Moor"	2:52
18.	"Polka Dot Bones"	3:44
19.	"For Evelyn"	3:06
20.	"Wretched Fate"	3:09
21.	"Fourteen"	3:00
22.	"Misery"	2:03
Total length:		1:12:21

== Personnel ==
Credits adapted from the Blossoms liner notes.

Blossoms

- Tom Ogden – vocals, rhythm guitar, piano (track 5)
- Charlie Salt – bass guitar, backing vocals
- Josh Dewhurst – lead guitar (all tracks except 5 and 10)
- Joe Donovan – drums (all tracks except 5)
- Myles Kellock – keyboards (all tracks except 5)

Additional musicians

- James Skelly – backing vocals (tracks 1 and 3), guitar (track 4)
- Rich Turvey – additional keyboards (all tracks except 2 and 7)
- Ian Skelly – percussion (tracks 3 and 10)

Design

- Salvador Design – design
- Jenna Foxton – photography
- Danny North – photography
- Charlie Salt – photography

Production

- James Skelly – production
- Rich Turvey – production
- Matt Colton – mastering
- David Wrench – mixing
- Marta Salogni – mixing

== Charts ==
=== Weekly charts ===
Chart (2016)	Peak position
Dutch Albums (Album Top 100)	185
Irish Albums (IRMA)	12
Scottish Albums (Official Charts)	1
UK Albums (Official Charts)	1

=== Year-end charts ===
Chart (2016)	Position
UK Albums (OCC)	92

== Certifications ==
Region	Certification	Certified units/sales
United Kingdom (BPI)	Gold	150,062

== Release history ==
Region	Release date	Format	Label
United Kingdom	5 August 2016	Digital download; CD	Virgin EMI
