= Foolish Loving Spaces =

Studio album by Blossoms
- Released: 31 January 2020
- Recorded: May–December 2019
- Studios: Parr Street Studios, Liverpool
- Length: 34:05
- Label: Virgin EMI
- Producers: James Skelly; Rich Turvey

Blossoms chronology
Cool Like You (2018)	Foolish Loving Spaces (2020)	Blossoms in Isolation (2020)

Blossoms studio chronology
Cool Like You (2018)	Foolish Loving Spaces (2020)	Ribbon Around the Bomb (2022)

Singles from Foolish Loving Spaces
- 1. "Your Girlfriend" Released: 20 June 2019; 2. "The Keeper" Released: 22 November 2019; 3. "If You Think This Is Real Life" Released: 27 January 2020

Professional ratings
Aggregate scores
Source	Rating
Metacritic	76/100
Review scores
Source	Rating
AllMusic	4/5 stars
Clash	8/10
The Guardian	3/5 stars
musicOMH	4/5 stars
NME	4/5 stars

Foolish Loving Spaces is the third studio album by the English indie pop band Blossoms. It was released on 31 January 2020 by Virgin EMI Records, and again produced by James Skelly and Rich Turvey. The album was supported by the singles "Your Girlfriend", "The Keeper" and "If You Think This Is Real Life". It debuted atop the UK Albums Chart, becoming the band's second UK number-one album, with 18,945 copies sold in its first week in the UK.

== Background and recording ==
Frontman Tom Ogden began writing the album at his parents' house, where he wrote the first two Blossoms albums, as he had started renovating the home he shared with his girlfriend. He resolved to make his room the first room finished in the renovation process so as to write there; after the work was done, he bought an upright piano and wrote 25 songs after being inspired by Talking Heads' Stop Making Sense, U2's The Joshua Tree and Primal Scream's Screamadelica. The initial plan to record the album in Nashville was abandoned in favour of the "more familiar surroundings" of the Parr Street Studios in Liverpool.

== Track listing ==
All tracks are written by Tom Ogden, Josh Dewhurst, Charlie Salt, Joe Donovan, and Myles Kellock.

Foolish Loving Spaces track listing
No.	Title	Length
1.	"If You Think This Is Real Life"	2:51
2.	"Your Girlfriend"	2:41
3.	"The Keeper"	3:23
4.	"My Swimming Brain"	3:48
5.	"Sunday Was a Friend of Mine"	3:09
6.	"Oh No (I Think I'm in Love)"	3:45
7.	"Romance, Eh?"	2:50
8.	"My Vacant Days"	2:25
9.	"Falling for Someone"	3:35
10.	"Like Gravity"	5:38
Total length:		34:05

Extended edition track listing
No.	Title	Length
11.	"Christmas Eve (Soul Purpose)"	3:45
12.	"It's Going To Be A Cold Winter"	2:16
13.	"Pure Pop"	3:23
14.	"Under The Sun"	4:45
15.	"Something For The Mind"	2:52
Total length:		51:14

Deluxe edition bonus track listing
No.	Title	Length
1.	"If You Think This Is Real Life" (Acoustic)	2:48
2.	"Your Girlfriend" (Acoustic)	2:34
3.	"The Keeper" (Acoustic)	3:09
4.	"My Swimming Brain" (Acoustic)	3:15
5.	"Sunday Was a Friend of Mine" (Acoustic)	2:55
6.	"Oh No (I Think I'm in Love)" (Acoustic)	3:49
7.	"Romance, Eh?" (Acoustic)	2:55
8.	"My Vacant Days" (Acoustic)	2:22
9.	"Falling for Someone" (Acoustic)	3:44
10.	"Like Gravity" (Acoustic)	4:19
Total length:		32:50

== Personnel ==
Credits adapted from Foolish Loving Spaces liner notes.

Blossoms

- Tom Ogden – vocals, rhythm guitar, piano (track 3)
- Charlie Salt – bass guitar, backing vocals, moog bass (track 6)
- Josh Dewhurst – lead guitar, lap steel guitar (track 2)
- Joe Donovan – drums, percussion
- Myles Kellock – keyboards

Additional musicians

- Ian Skelly – additional percussion
- James Skelly – backing vocals (tracks 1, 2, 4, 7 and 10)
- Kim Wedderburne – backing vocals (tracks 1, 3 and 4)
- Mica Townsend – backing vocals (tracks 3, 6, 9 and 10)
- Yvonne Shelton – backing vocals (tracks 1, 3, 4, 6, 9 and 10)
- Zak McDonnell – cymbal (track 1), clapping (track 2)
- Kristopher Bradford – clapping (track 2)
- Rich Turvey – additional keyboards (tracks 1, 2, 3 and 7), piano (track 8)

Design

- Leo Villareal – artwork
- Erik Djurklou – photography
- Ewan Ogden – photography

Production

- James Skelly – production
- Rich Turvey – production
- Ben Claughan – engineering
- Kristopher Bradford – engineering
- Joe LaPorta – mastering
- Kennie Takahashi – mixing

== Charts ==
Sales chart performance for Foolish Loving Spaces
Chart (2020)	Peak position
Irish Albums (IRMA)	67
Scottish Albums (Official Charts)	2
UK Albums (Official Charts)	1

== Certifications ==
Region	Certification	Certified units/sales
United Kingdom (BPI)	Silver	60,000^{‡}
^{‡} Sales+streaming figures based on certification alone.

== See also ==
- List of 2020 albums
