= Plaza Cinema, Stockport =

Cinema in Greater Manchester, England

Plaza Super Cinema and Variety Theatre
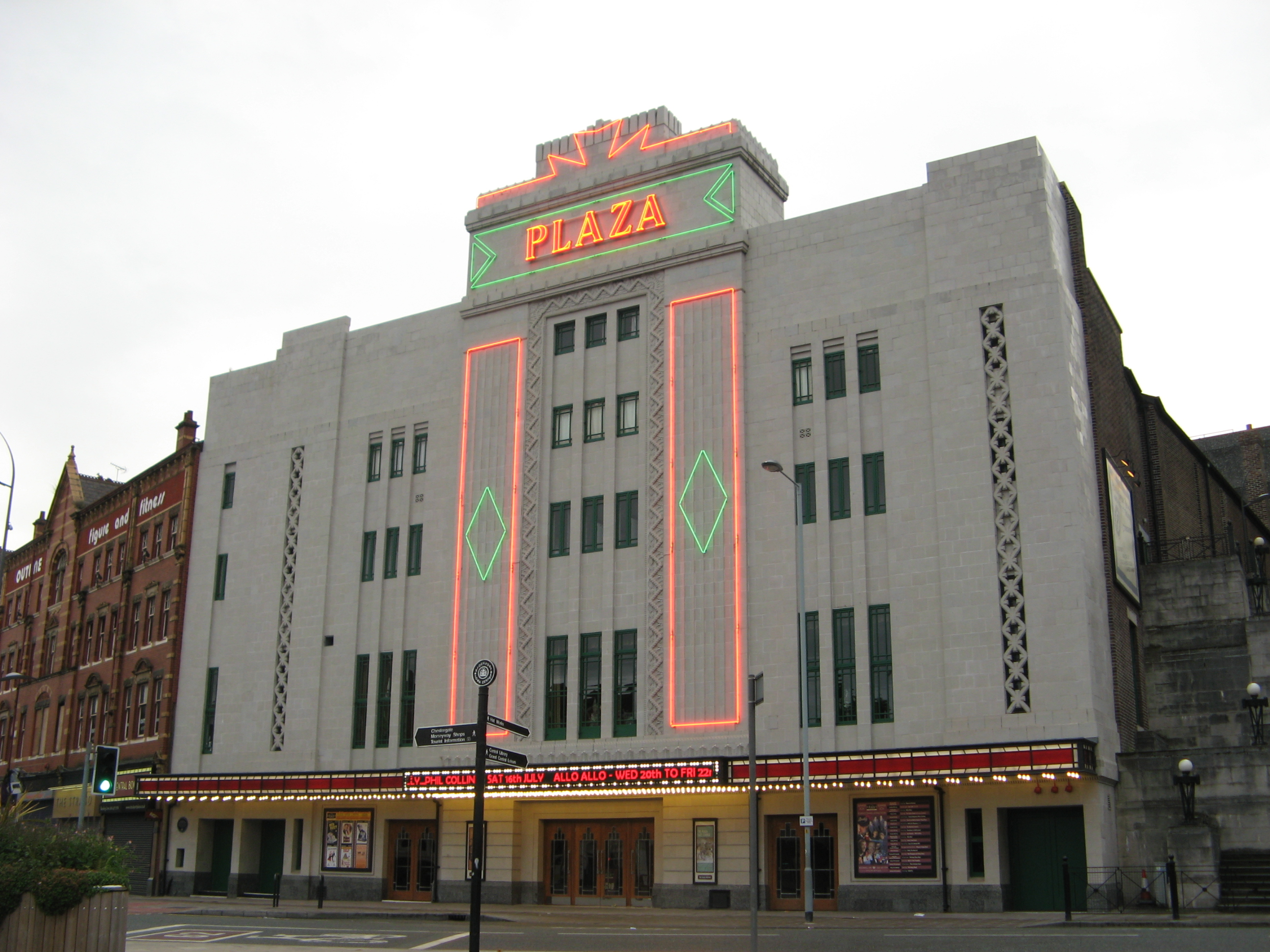
- The Plaza from Mersey Square, 2021

- Location within Greater Manchester

General information
- Location: Stockport, England
- Coordinates: 53.4113°N 2.1572°W
- Construction started: 1932
- Completed: 1933
- Opened: 7 October 1932
- Owner: Stockport Plaza Trust

Technical details
- Structural system: Brick and steel

Design and construction
- Architect: William Thornley
- Designations

Listed Building – Grade II*
- Official name: Plaza Cinema
- Designated: 12 March 1997
- Reference no.: 1257697

Other information
- Seating capacity: 1,314 (seated)

Website
- stockportplaza.co.uk

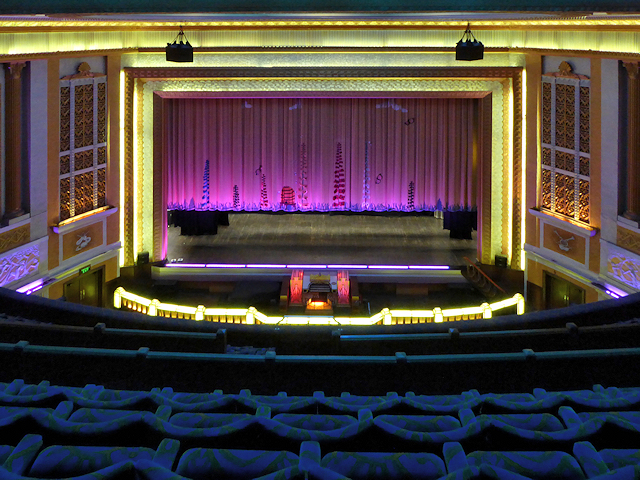
Auditorium of the restored cinema. As a result of excavating a large part of the sandstone cliff behind the site, much of the stage is actually underground beneath Hooper Street.

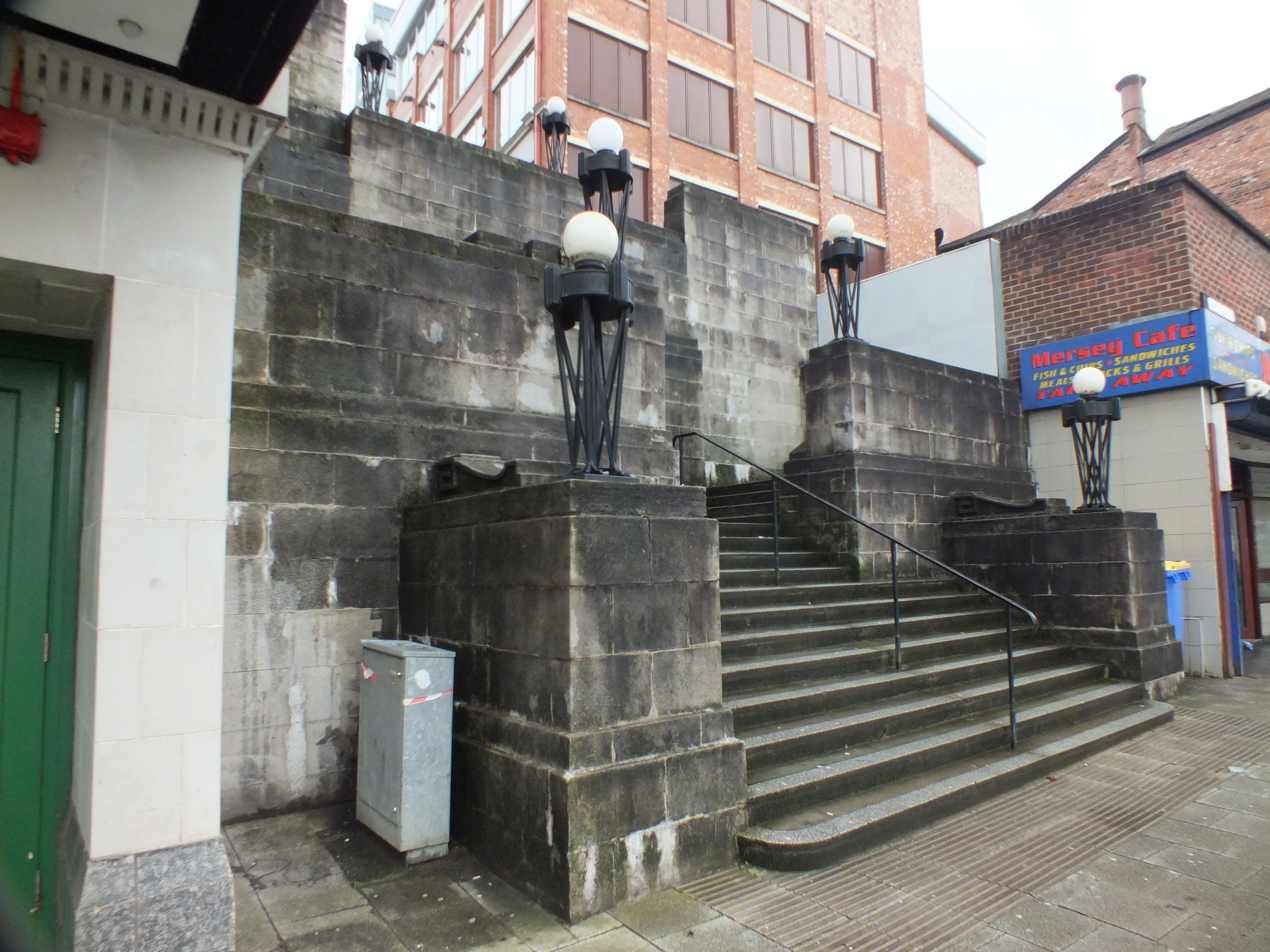
The bottom of the Plaza Steps in Mersey Square, 2013

The Plaza is a Grade II* listed art deco single-screen cinema and theatre in Stockport, Greater Manchester, England. It opened in 1932, its construction having involved the excavation of the sandstone cliff behind it. After an initial closure in 1966 and a subsequent period in use as a bingo hall by Rank Leisure, it has now been restored as a cinema and theatre, showing films and staging live shows.

== Building ==
The building was designed in 1929 by William Thornley and constructed in 1932–33. It is in the Art Deco style, and is of brick, with much internal structural steelwork, and with its front elevation clad in faience, a glazed architectural terracotta. It contains a double-height auditorium with a gallery and small stage. The auditorium is decorated with vaguely Greek and Egyptian plasterwork and mouldings, including a broad proscenium arch, pilasters with Corinthian capitals, and friezes of dancing maidens and musical instruments. Many motifs were derived directly from the 1925 Paris Exhibition of Decorative Arts. These features were enhanced by a sophisticated concealed Holophane lighting system, fragments of which survive. It had an original seating capacity of around 1,873, and in its restored state has 614 seats in the stalls, 318 in the front circle and 254 in the rear circle (the balcony).

There is also a foyer with a long, first-floor restaurant above, overlooking Mersey Square. It was listed in 1997 at Grade II* by Historic England. It is described as a "remarkably lavish exercise in the Art Deco style", and an "exceptionally complete example of a 1930s 'super' cinema, which survives little altered and retains its Compton organ".

=== Compton theatre organ ===
The Plaza's original organ is still in situ. It was built by the John Compton Organ Company and was ready in time for the opening of the cinema on 6 October 1932. It was the first Compton theatre organ to be built with sunburst decorative glass panels, which can be illuminated in a range of colours, and is now one of the very few that remains in its original location.

The Compton organ is a three-manual instrument with a unique 150 stop tab layout which was designed for the Plaza by Norman Cocker, the resident organist from Manchester Cathedral, and Arthur Ward, one of the original Directors of the Plaza. It has in addition 42 toe and thumb pistons. There are 11 ranks of pipes contained in two chambers, one over the other to the right of the stage. These are concealed behind the decorative grille in the wall. There is no electric amplification, as the sound is produced acoustically straight from the organ pipes. The console is on a lift so that it can rise out of the floor, adding to the theatrical effect. As there is no amplification the organist controls the volume using swell pedals that operate shutters in the grille. It is played before shows, and during silent movies, variety shows and musical interludes between films. The organ can supply a large range of effects from sleigh bells to aircraft and sea sounds.

== History ==
=== Early history ===
The first plans for a cinema on this site were made speculatively by William Thornley in 1929. It was a conservative scheme that incorporated a motor garage, a billiard hall, and a restaurant all above a 1,600-seat cinema. Thornley, an architect originating from Bolton who had trained with Bradshaw Gass & Hope, was experienced in designing small-scale silent film cinemas.

Directors of the Ambassador cinema circuit, Fred Read, Alfred Snape and Arthur Ward had just opened the 1,850 seat Regal Cinema 7.9 miles (12.7 km) away in Manchester Road, Altrincham, were looking for a site in central Stockport in 1931. They evaluated Thornley's speculative scheme but rejected his original design. As a condition of buying the site on Mersey Square to develop, they commissioned him to adapt the plans for the Regal Altrincham – which was designed by Drury & Gomersall and described as the 'Cathedral of the Movies' – for the smaller and more restricted Stockport site without reducing the seating capacity for 1,850 patrons. (Note: The Regal, Altrincham was destroyed by fire in 1956. Nothing remains.)

Although he was uncredited due to part of the sale contract, Joseph Gomersall from the Regal's design team is responsible for the interior design rather than Thornley. He had travelled around Europe to sample the latest architectural trends and had a professional background in theatre design.

A row of cottages previously occupying the site were purchased and demolished. A set of limestone steps was then built to connect Mersey Square with the higher-level Lawrence Street, which are now known as The Plaza Steps. 10,000 tonnes of sandstone was excavated to a depth of 42 feet (13 m) to create The Plaza and the adjacent steps, leaving the building partially underground and secured by 111 rock bolts. The Plaza was welcomed by the local cinemagoers but opposed by the local business community, unhappy about the use of labourers from elsewhere while the town was still suffering from the Great Depression. Technically the cinema had all the latest equipment; the projectors that could project silent and sound stock, and a Compton organ to be played during the silent news reels. It opened as a cine-variety venue.

The Plaza first opened its doors to the public on 7 October 1932, with a charity show for Stockport Infirmary. As soon as the mid-1930s, cine-variety had ended and the Plaza shows assumed the familiar pattern of one feature film and a supporting B movie. The Plaza attracted competition and by 1939 there were two further super cinemas in the town centre, and two in the suburbs. (Note: Town Centre: Super; Essoldo, Wellington Road South; Ritz, St Petersgate; Outskirts: Davenport, Buxton Road; Empress, Heaton Norris.)

During World War II (1939–1945), being cut into the rock face led to the Plaza being considered one of the safest to shelter during an air raid. After the war, despite audiences declining nationally, the Plaza was in the 1950s refurbished with the entertainment tax relief incentive, and diversified into CinemaScope and 3D screenings. As well as screening films, it staged variety acts, hosted acrobatic troupes, offered stand-up comedy, concerts and during Christmas 1960, staged its first pantomime.

However, audiences declined as the 1960s went on, during a period where TV ownership was ever increasing. In July 1965, the Plaza was sold to Mecca Bingo for conversion into a bingo hall. The conversion to a bingo hall was refused by Stockport Borough Council planning committee; this ruling was then overturned by appeal to the government and Mecca proceeded with its plan. The Plaza’s final show was on 31 December 1966 and featured Jerry Lewis in Three on a Couch and Audie Murphy in The Texican. The bingo hall opened in February 1967. In the 1970s the first-floor café was converted into "Samantha's" nightclub but this later converted into extra bingo seating.

By 1999, The Rank Group, which had bought Mecca in 1990, decided to close the bingo venue at the Plaza. By the time of closure, it had been listed at Grade II was the last remaining building in the Borough of Stockport still capable of full-scale theatre and entertainment use. Following a local campaign, the building was sold in March 2000 to the Stockport Plaza Trust, a newly established charity which intended to bring back the former use of showing films and staging live shows.

=== Restoration ===
After the sale to the Stockport Plaza Trust, the group of volunteers initially raised over £3 million to put towards some early-stage restorations and the reopening of the Plaza for live shows and vintage film presentations. Its listing was upgraded to Grade II* in August 2000; the lobby, auditorium and café still feature original plasterwork in striking geometric designs along with original tiling, whilst previously lost features such as murals have either been restored or recreated. The first cinema show in December 2000 featured a performance of 42nd Street (1933) which had been the first film shown at the Plaza in 1932. The Compton organ was found to be in working order, it was powered up and a performance of 1930s singalong music was given by Nigel Ogden.

The Plaza was closed during 2009, and a £1.9 million restoration, funded by a National Lottery grant took place. Volunteers restored the Plaza to its original 1932 configuration. The façade has been given a new name sign as well as red and green side panels, all constructed with neon lighting. 2017 saw the installation of new Art Deco seating for the whole auditorium, cast from the original designs.

=== Timeline ===
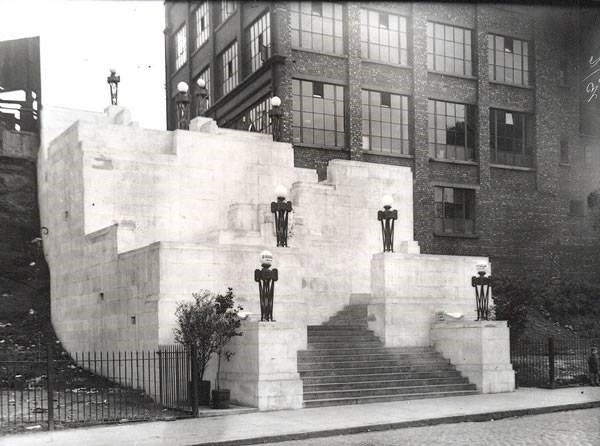
The newly built Plaza Steps prior to the building of the Plaza, 1932

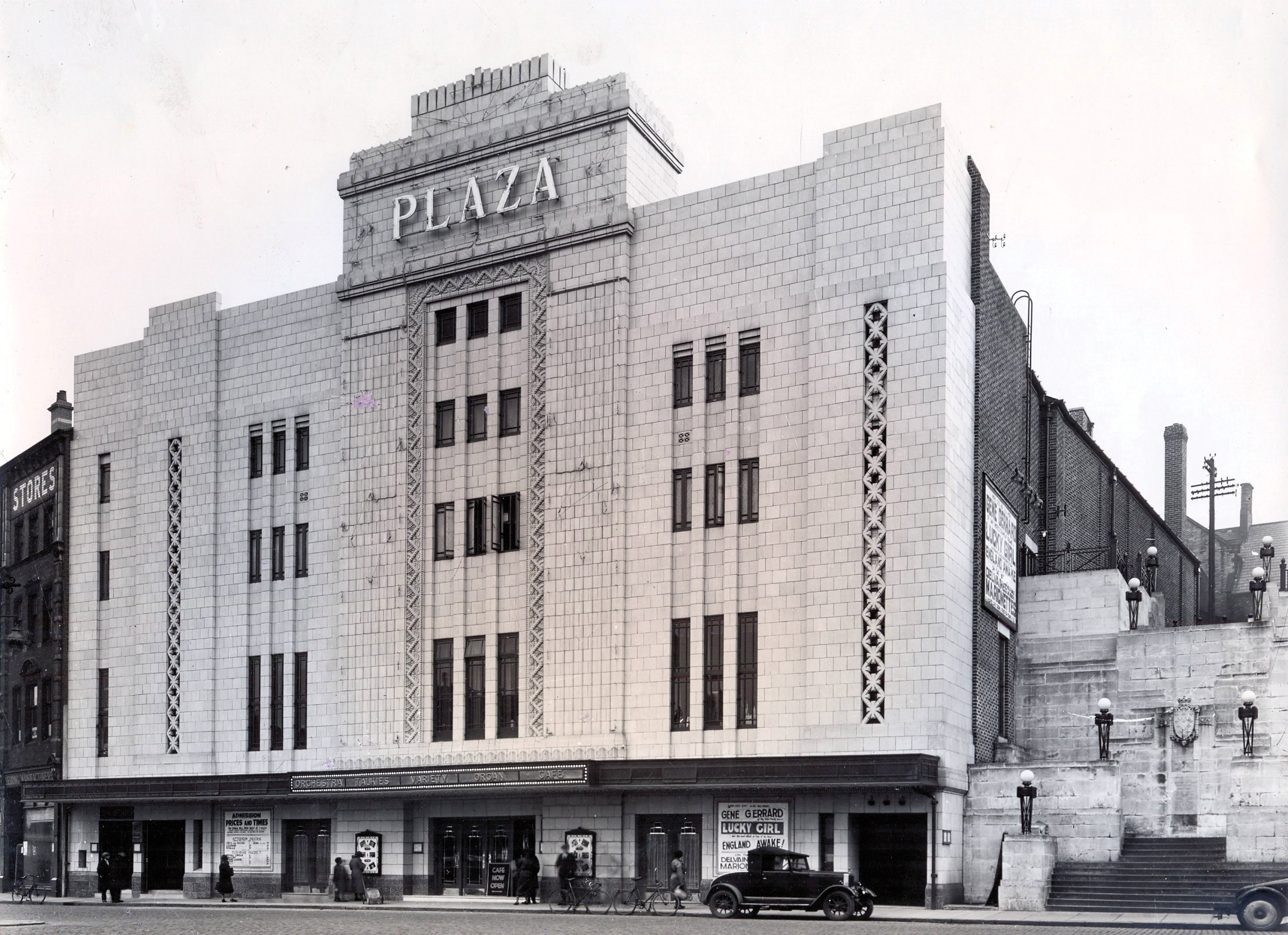
The Plaza façade during the opening week in October 1932

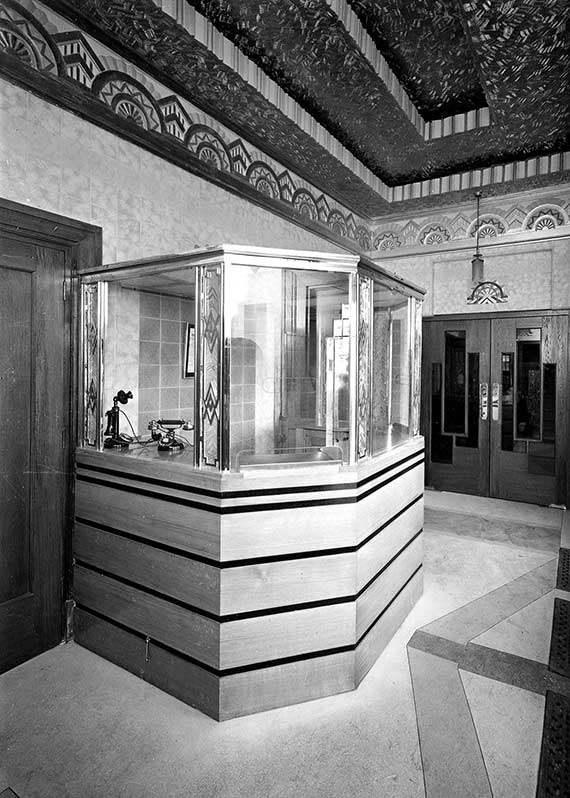
Foyer and pay box on opening day – 7 October 1932

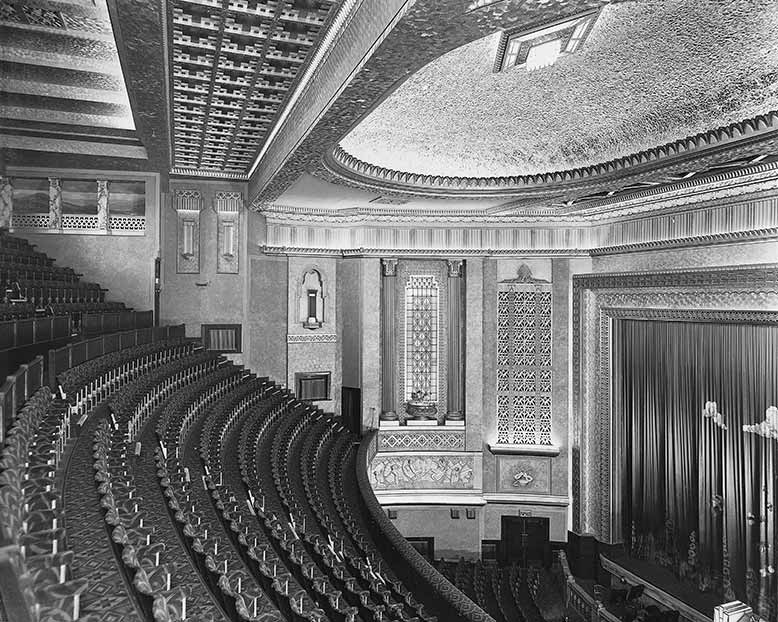
The auditorium on opening day, 1932

The Plaza was the final cinema constructed for the Ambassador Cinema Circuit (1926-1933), beginning with the Ambassador Super Cinema in Pendleton in 1928. This circuit also included the Kingsway Super Cinema in Levenshulme, the Heaton Park Cinema in Whitefield, the Carlton Super Cinema in Clayton, all built in 1929, and the Regal Super Cinema in Altrincham in 1931. All of these have since been demolished, making the Plaza the last surviving cinema from the Ambassador Circuit.

Owners of the Plaza have been:

- Ambassador Circuit (1926–1933)
- Snape & Ward Circuit (1934–1955)
- G.B. Snape Circuit (1956–1965)
- Mecca Bingo (1965–1990)
- The Rank Organisation (1990–1999)
- Stockport Plaza Trust (2000–present)

Cinema

- 1929 (April): First scheme submitted to Stockport Corporation for the construction of Cinema, Mersey Square, Stockport
- 1931: Construction of the Regal Cinema, Altrincham, designed by Drury and Gomersall for the Ambassador Cinema Circuit
- 1932 (Oct): The Plaza Super Cinema opens in Stockport
- 1933 (Sept): Death of Fred Read, Chairman of the Ambassador Cinema Circuit
- 1934: Remaining Ambassador Circuit Directors, Alfred Snape and Arthur Ward assume control under the Snape & Ward Cinema Circuit
- 1936: Death of Director Arthur Ward, son Harold succeeds to his share of the business
- 1937: Front Circle rake altered, balcony front raised, stage level raised
- 1947: Death of Director Alfred Snape, son Brian succeeds to his share of the business
- 1949: Seven day programme introduced (same film for seven days)
- 1953 (Aug): Large 48 ft × 18 ft (14.6 m × 5.5 m) projection screen installed
- 1953: Stockport's first 3D film presentation at – "Sangaree"
- 1954: First CinemaScope presentation
- 1955: Harold Ward exits the business to form the Ward Cinema Circuit
- 1956: Brian Snape took ownership of the Plaza and the remaining Snape & Ward cinemas, renaming the circuit as the G.B. Snape Circuit
- 1960: First pantomime, Babes in the Wood featuring the Dallas Boys
- 1965 (July): Purchased by the Mecca Group
- 1966 (Dec): Closes as a cinema

Bingo hall

- 1967: Modifications to the auditorium to accommodate bingo; removal of roof tiling, loss of external veranda, neon lighting and signage. Flat floor insertion at rear of stalls, and alterations to foyer. Alterations to café area.
- 1967 (Feb): Reopens as a bingo hall
- 1997 (Mar): Cinema listed Grade II by English Heritage
- 1999: Cinema closes as a bingo hall

Restored cinema

- 2000 (Aug): Listing upgraded to Grade II* by English Heritage
- 2000: Purchased by the Stockport Plaza Trust, first restorations started, and re-opened for live shows and vintage film presentations. First cinema show in December 2000 featured a performance of 42nd Street which had been the first film shown at the Plaza in 1932. There was also a variety performance, and Nigel Ogden of BBC Radio 2's The Organist Entertains played the Compton Organ for a 1930s style singalong before the screening. (The organ had been found to be in full working order, only needing the power switched on to be used.)
- 2005: Further restoration plans begin
- 2007: The Heritage Lottery Fund approves an application for funding of £1.9 million towards further restoration
- 2009 (Feb): Jimmy Carr officially closes the Plaza with two sell out shows and work begins on restoration and refurbishment
- 2009 (May): 'Plaza on Tour' commences – a host of events in alternative venues throughout the region during the Plaza's closure
- 2009 (Dec): The Plaza reopens following a £3.2 million restoration
- 2012 (Apr): Plaza obtains a venue licence enabling it to host wedding ceremonies, Louise Burchell and Ben Wainwright become the first to be wed at the Plaza
- 2013: Front Circle rake restored and balcony front lowered to original design, stage surface renewed
- 2014 (Jul/Aug): Brand new Art Deco seating cast from the original designs for the entire auditorium, removing the mixed origin seating.
- 2015 (May): Murals reinstated in the balcony of Wetherlam and Little Langdale Tarn in the Lake District.
- 2015 (Aug): Compton organ restoration including the glass panel sides, pipes and bellows.
- 2016 (July): Murals reinstated in stalls of musical instruments which include cymbals, tambourines, wind and various string instruments.
- 2024 (Aug): New house tab curtains, more exact replicas of the 1932 design are installed, recreated by J&C Joels, theatrical curtain and drapes specialists

== Filming location ==
Used as filming location, including for:

- Life on Mars (series 2, episode 6 – 2007)
- The Maple State, Temperate Lives (2009)
- Just Henry (2011)
- Eric and Ernie (2011)
- Who Do You Think You Are? (Series 10, episode 3; Minnie Driver – 2013)
- Messages Home: Lost films of the British Army (2016)
- Road to Wembley (2016)
- Tina and Bobby (2017)
- Time for Tea [Short Film] (2017)
- Peaky Blinders (Series 5, episode 6 – 2019) as the Bingley Hall in Birmingham
- Federal Charm, Can't Rule Me (2019)
- Bargain Hunt (Series 54, episode 22 – 2019)
- The Stranger (2020) Netflix
- Larkins – "Are We Having Any Fun Yet" (2020)
- Jason Manford – "Muddle Class" (2020)
- Blossoms live at the Plaza Stockport (2020)
- A Certain Ratio – "Keep It Together" music video (2021)
- Blossoms – "Care For" music video (2021)
- Blossoms – "Ribbon Around the Bomb" Album Short Film (2022)
- Nolly – ITV mini series; episode 2 (2022) – Noele Gordon arrives to watch her friend Larry Grayson appear on stage

== See also ==
- Grade II* listed buildings in Greater Manchester
- Listed buildings in Stockport

== Notes and references ==
Notes

Footnotes
