= Cool Like You =

Studio album by Blossoms
- Released: 27 April 2018
- Recorded: December 2016 – January 2018
- Studios: Parr Street Studios, Liverpool
- Genres: Indie pop; pop rock
- Length: 36:55
- Label: Virgin EMI
- Producers: James Skelly; Rich Turvey

Blossoms chronology
Blossoms (2016)	Cool Like You (2018)	Foolish Loving Spaces (2020)

Singles from Cool Like You
- 1. "I Can't Stand It" Released: 1 March 2018; 2. "There's a Reason Why (I Never Returned Your Calls)" Released: 25 April 2018; 3. "How Long Will This Last?" Released: 17 August 2018

Professional ratings
Review scores
Source	Rating
Clash	7/10
Dork	4/5 stars
The Guardian	4/5 stars
musicOMH	3.5/5 stars
NME	4/5 stars

Cool Like You is the second studio album by the English indie pop band Blossoms. It was released in the United Kingdom on 27 April 2018, by Virgin EMI Records. The album was produced by James Skelly and Rich Turvey. It peaked at number 4 on the UK Albums Chart, and at number 1 on the Official Vinyl Albums Chart and it received a silver certification in the United Kingdom in 2019 and a gold certification in 2022.

== Background and recording ==
During periods when the band was not touring, Tom Ogden started recording demos of songs and sending them to producer James Skelly. The song "I Can't Stand It" caught Skelly's attention, describing it as "Kylie Minogue meets New Order", and it became the benchmark for the album.

The album was recorded at Parr Street Studios in Liverpool, where their self-titled debut was recorded, and featured the same producers, Skelley and Richard Turvey. Unlike their debut, the majority of songs were written by Tom Ogden with a synthesiser rather than a guitar. The band also wanted the album to be more upbeat and fast-paced than the first album, with many of the songs ending up faster than their original demos.

The band have cited 1980s synth-pop as inspiration for the synth-based sound on the album, and got some new keyboards similar to those used on the Stranger Things soundtrack.

The title is taken from the track "Cool Like You", which is a tongue-in-cheek response to the music industry, saying "We're not going to be cool like you. We’re going to do our own thing.".

== Release and promotion ==
In the weeks leading up to the album's announcement, a Twitter spat between bandmates Tom Ogden and Joe Donovan led fans to question the future of the band. This was later confirmed to be a fake argument, and was staged for the mockumentary "Where Are Blossoms?", which featured Joe Donovan as an ice cream man and Myles Kellock pursuing a rap career.

The album was announced in February 2018 alongside the track listing and a UK Tour. The lead single "I Can't Stand It" was released on 1 March 2018, with the second single "There's a Reason Why (I Never Returned Your Calls)" being released on 25 April 2018.

== Track listing ==
All tracks are written by Tom Ogden, Josh Dewhurst, Charlie Salt, Joe Donovan & Myles Kellock

No.	Title	Length
1.	"There's a Reason Why (I Never Returned Your Calls)"	3:42
2.	"I Can't Stand It"	2:57
3.	"Cool Like You"	3:05
4.	"Unfaithful"	2:59
5.	"Stranger Still"	3:34
6.	"How Long Will This Last?"	3:20
7.	"Between the Eyes"	3:23
8.	"I Just Imagined You"	2:58
9.	"Giving Up the Ghost"	3:21
10.	"Lying Again"	3:42
11.	"Love Talk"	3:48
Total length:		36:55

Deluxe edition bonus disc
No.	Title	Length
1.	"There's a Reason Why (I Never Returned Your Calls)" (acoustic)	3:41
2.	"I Can't Stand It" (acoustic)	3:22
3.	"Cool Like You" (acoustic)	3:07
4.	"Unfaithful" (acoustic)	3:02
5.	"Stranger Still" (acoustic)	3:26
6.	"How Long Will This Last?" (acoustic)	3:27
7.	"Between the Eyes" (acoustic)	3:22
8.	"I Just Imagined You" (acoustic)	3:04
9.	"Giving Up the Ghost" (acoustic)	3:25
10.	"Lying Again" (acoustic)	3:15
11.	"Love Talk" (acoustic)	3:13
Total length:		1:13:22

== Personnel ==
Credits adapted from Cool Like You liner notes.

Blossoms

- Tom Ogden – vocals, rhythm guitar, keyboards, percussion (track 8)
- Charlie Salt – bass guitar, backing vocals, percussion (track 8), keyboards (track 11)
- Josh Dewhurst – lead guitar, percussion (track 8)
- Joe Donovan – drums
- Myles Kellock – keyboards, talkbox (track 3)

Additional musicians

- James Skelly – backing vocals (tracks 1, 6, 8 and 10), percussion (track 8)
- Rich Turvey – keyboards (tracks 1, 4, 6, 8 and 11), guitars (track 10)

Design

- Salvador Design – album design
- Danny North – photography
- Charlie Salt – additional photography

Production

- James Skelly – production
- Rich Turvey – production
- David Wrench – additional production (tracks 1, 2, 5 and 7), mixing
- Matt Colton – mastering
- Cecile Desnos – engineering
- Grace Banks – engineering
- Charlotte Sutcliffe – engineering assistant
- Daniel Hancox – engineering assistant
- Elliott Parkin – engineering assistant
- Jay Leahey – engineering assistant

== Charts ==
Chart (2018)	Peak position
Irish Albums (IRMA)	46
Scottish Albums (Official Charts)	4
UK Albums (OCC)	4

== Certifications ==
Certifications and sales for Cool Like You
Region	Certification	Certified units/sales
United Kingdom (BPI)	Gold	100,000^{‡}
^{‡} Sales+streaming figures based on certification alone.
