= Your Girlfriend =

2019 song by Blossoms

Single by Blossoms

from the album Foolish Loving Spaces
- B-side: "Torn Up"
- Released: 20 June 2019
- Length: 2:41
- Label: Virgin EMI
- Songwriters: Tom Ogden; Josh Dewhurst; Joe Donovan; Myles Kellock; Charlie Salt
- Producers: James Skelly; Rich Turvey

Blossoms singles chronology
"How Long Will This Last?" (2018)	"Your Girlfriend" (2019)	"The Keeper" (2019)

"Your Girlfriend" is a song performed by the English rock band Blossoms. The song was released as a single in the United Kingdom on 20 June 2019 by Virgin EMI Records as the lead single from their third studio album, Foolish Loving Spaces. The song has peaked at number 100 on the UK Singles Chart and number 59 on the Scottish Singles Chart.

== Background ==
The song was produced by James Skelly, Rich Turvey and the band at Parr Street Studios in Liverpool. Talking about the song, Tom Ogden said, "I think I saw it on the telly or maybe heard it on another song. Someone was saying they’re in love with their friend's girlfriend and I thought ooh that's a good, strange take on a love song. A different angle to go at and it's obviously not about me, just to be clear! I was listening to a lot of Talking Heads at the time, and I think that shines through in the way the song grooves. These are some of my favourite lyrics I’ve ever written, there’s a lot of humour in there." The single cover was taken by Ewan Ogden, Tom Ogden’s brother.

== Music video ==
A music video to accompany the release of "Your Girlfriend" was first released onto YouTube on 20 June 2019. In the video the band dress up as their favourite horror characters, Teen Wolf, Dracula, Frankenstein's monster and the Bride of Frankenstein.

== Track listing ==
Digital download
No.	Title	Length
1.	"Your Girlfriend"	2:41
2.	"Torn Up"	2:42

Digital download
No.	Title	Length
1.	"Your Girlfriend" (Acoustic)	2:37

== Charts ==
Chart (2019)	Peak position
Belgium (Ultratip Bubbling Under Flanders)	40
Scotland Singles (OCC)	59
UK Singles (OCC)	100

== Certifications ==
Region	Certification	Certified units/sales
United Kingdom (BPI)	Gold	400,000^{‡}
^{‡} Sales+streaming figures based on certification alone.

== Release history ==
Region	Date	Format	Label
United Kingdom	20 June 2019	Digital download; streaming	Virgin EMI Records
