= There's a Reason Why (I Never Returned Your Calls) =

Single by Blossoms

from the album Cool Like You
- Released: 25 April 2018
- Length: 3:42
- Label: Virgin EMI
- Songwriters: Tom Ogden; Josh Dewhurst; Joe Donovan; Myles Kellock; Charlie Salt
- Producers: James Skelly; Richard Turvey

Blossoms singles chronology
"I Can't Stand It" (2018)	"There's a Reason Why (I Never Returned Your Calls)" (2018)	"How Long Will This Last?" (2018)

"There's a Reason Why (I Never Returned Your Calls)" is a song performed by the English rock band Blossoms. The song was released as a single in the United Kingdom on 25 April 2018 by Virgin EMI Records as the second single from their second studio album Cool Like You. The song has peaked at number 95 on the UK Singles Chart and number 81 on the Scottish Singles Chart.

An alternate recording of the song features on the soundtrack of Finding Emily.

== Music video ==
A music video to accompany the release of "There's a Reason Why (I Never Returned Your Calls)" was first released onto YouTube on 27 April 2018. The music video was directed by Masashi Muto and was filmed in Tokyo. The video was inspired by The Beatles' famous 1964 musical film. When talking about the video, the band said, "We took influence from The Beatles’ A Hard Day’s Night and tried to capture the camaraderie between us a band of friends. [...] When we wanted to make a video overseas somewhere, it was always going to be Tokyo. We loved being chased around the streets and it made five lads from Stockport feel like the Beatles for a day."

== Track listing ==
Digital download - Remixes
No.	Title	Length
1.	"There's a Reason Why (I Never Returned Your Calls)" (Deiago Remix)	2:19
2.	"There's a Reason Why (I Never Returned Your Calls)" (Satin Jackets Remix)	5:41

== Charts ==
Chart (2018)	Peak position
Scotland Singles (OCC)	81
UK Singles (OCC)	95

== Certifications ==
Region	Certification	Certified units/sales
United Kingdom (BPI)	Gold	400,000^{‡}
^{‡} Sales+streaming figures based on certification alone.

== Release history ==
Region	Date	Format	Label
United Kingdom	25 April 2018	Digital download; streaming	Virgin EMI Records
