= Blossoms (band) =

English indie pop group

- Blossoms performing at the O_{2} Apollo Manchester in 2024

Background information
- Origin: Stockport, Greater Manchester, England
- Genres: Indie pop; indie rock; synth-pop; alternative rock; new wave
- Works: Discography
- Years active: 2013–present
- Labels: Virgin EMI; Skeleton Key; ODD SK Recordings; Distiller
- Members: Tom Ogden; Charlie Salt; Josh Dewhurst; Joe Donovan; Myles Kellock
- Website: blossomsband.co.uk

Blossoms are an English indie rock band from Stockport, Greater Manchester, England. Formed in 2013, the band consists of Tom Ogden (lead vocals, guitar), Charlie Salt (bass guitar, backing vocals), Josh Dewhurst (lead guitar, percussion), Joe Donovan (drums) and Myles Kellock (keyboards, synthesizer).

They were on the BBC's Sound Of new music list for 2016, finishing in fourth place. Blossoms' eponymous debut studio album was one of the twelve LPs nominated for the Mercury Music Prize in 2017. That same year, they were nominated for British Breakthrough Act at the Brit Awards.

To date they have released six studio albums, Blossoms (2016), Cool Like You (2018), Foolish Loving Spaces (2020), Ribbon Around the Bomb (2022), Gary (2024), and Songs from the Wedding Cake (2026), with five of them reaching No. 1 in the UK Albums Chart.

== Career ==
=== Pre-Blossoms and formation ===
Unknowingly at the time, all members lived within two miles of each other whilst growing up. Ogden, Donovan and Dewhurst attended Stockport School, while Salt and Kellock attended Offerton School. They were all born at Stepping Hill Hospital in Stockport. Ogden and Donovan met on a school trip to Alton Towers in Staffordshire, 2005, and the others met through work. Their first concert was in April 2013 at the Night and Day Café on Oldham Street, Manchester.

=== 2013–2015: Early work ===
Upon Salt joining the band, they gained a rehearsal space, his grandfather's scaffolding yard, which they could use without paying for the time. The yard is depicted on the cover of their debut studio album. The band take their name from The Blossoms public house at the corner of Bramhall Lane and Buxton Road in Stockport. Donovan heard both Ogden and Salt mention how apt Blossoms was as a band name on separate occasions, leading to the naming of the band as Blossoms. They have since played shows at the Blossoms.

In January 2014, the band released their first single, "You Pulled a Gun on Me", and on 14 January 2014 they released a music video for the song. The video was self-produced with a small budget of £60. "You Pulled a Gun on Me" was recorded at Eve Studios in Stockport. In Spring 2014, Blossoms were signed to Skeleton Key Records (owned by James Skelly of the Coral). From March through to August 2014, Blossoms embarked upon their first UK tour to promote their extended play (EP) Bloom though they only played weekend shows due to all members of the band still holding full-time jobs, other than Dewhurst who was only 16 and still in full-time education. They got their first write up on the Louder Than War music and culture website, played their first festival (Tramlines in Sheffield at Yellow Arch Studios) and opened for the rock band James at Castlefield Bowl to 8,000 people, on 11 July 2014, which they described as a turning point in the band's future. Skelly produced their first official single "Blow", released 26 August 2014, the music video being shot at the scaffolding yard still being used as a rehearsal space.

In autumn 2014, Blossoms quit their jobs to fully pursue the band. They subsequently went on to do another full UK tour, this time selling out the Manchester date, hosted by Sound Control, a venue made famous by rock bands the Stone Roses and New Order. They also sold out a show at the Deaf Institute, Manchester, on 1 November 2014. Over the winter, Blossoms went back into Parr Street Studios with James Skelly to record "Cut Me and I'll Bleed", for which they announced an extensive UK tour between 31 January and 28 March 2015.

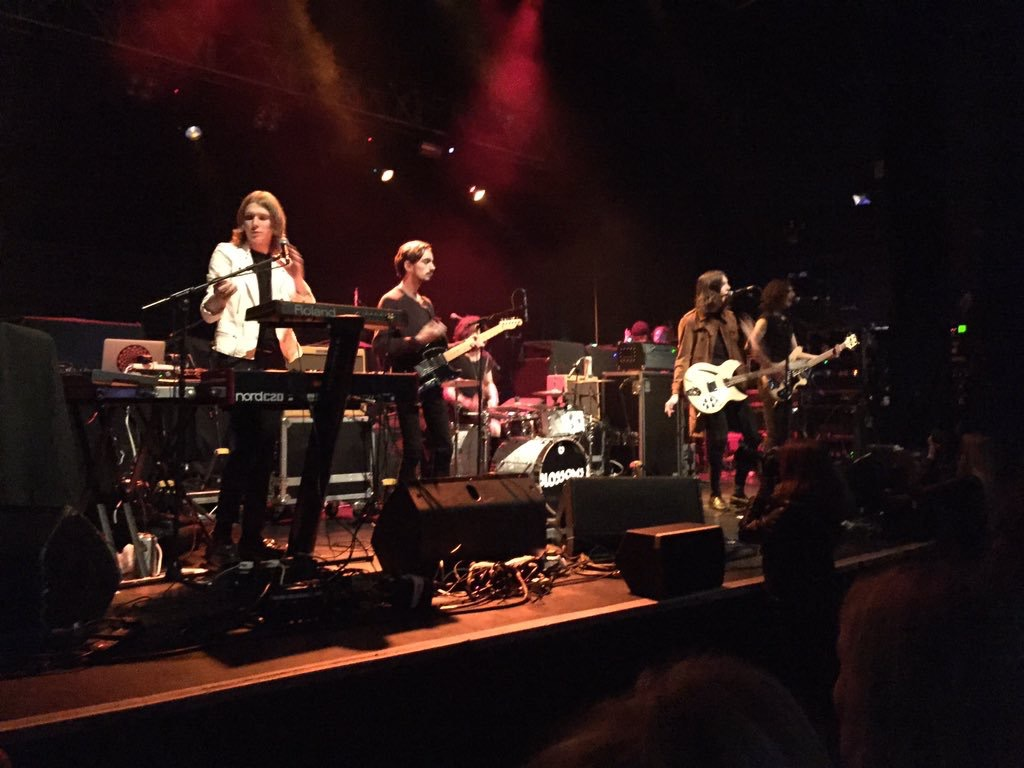
Blossoms performing at The Forum in Kentish Town, London, December 2015

Due to them having a contact in the business, the singer Liam Fray, this promoted them to tour with the Charlatans and Courteeners in March 2015. On 18 March 2015, Blossoms were invited by BBC Music Introducing to play a set for the Official SXSW Showcase at Latitude 30 in Austin, Texas. Blossoms recorded and released the Blown Rose EP between June and July, the music video once again shot at the scaffolding yard, released on 31 July along with the EP itself. This was the first EP released as part of Blossoms' new recording contract with Virgin EMI Records though they only announced the new contract on 18 August 2015. The band still work with James Skelly as their producer.

They went on to play a summer of festivals such as The Great Escape, Y Not and Reading and Leeds whilst also supporting Courteeners for their Heaton Park concert. Blossoms headlined their first festival stage on 5 September 2015 at Tim Peak's Diner as part of Festival Number 6. This was released as a 10" vinyl disc for Record Store Day 2017.

=== 2016–2017: Blossoms ===
Recording for their debut studio album began in September 2015. On 4 October 2015, Blossoms announced that their next single would be "Charlemagne". It was released on iTunes and Spotify on 5 October 2015. On 30 October 2015, the Charlemagne EP was released featuring three other songs ("Across the Moor", "For Evelyn" and "Polka Dot Bones"). "Charlemagne" went on to commercial success and became BBC Radio 1's track of the day and featured on Spotify's 'Spotlight on 2016' list. The commercial success extended through to December, when Charlemagne topped the Christmas vinyl chart.

On 5 January 2016, Blossoms announced their At Most a Kiss EP and released the song, with the video following. Whilst doing promotion for the EP Blossoms played the Radio 1 Live Lounge, covering R&B trio WSTRN's song "In2". They announced on 22 January 2016 that recording for their debut studio album was complete. Whilst on their third headline tour Blossoms had support from indie rock band Viola Beach, who were killed mid-tour in a car crash with their manager on 13 February 2016. Blossoms played a recorded set from a Leamington Spa performance for the remaining tour dates in the slot Viola Beach would have otherwise played in.

The At Most a Kiss EP was released on 23 February 2016. They were nominated for Best Breakthrough Act at the Brit Awards 2017 but lost to Rag'n'Bone Man. On 12 April 2016, Irish DJ Annie Mac played their song "Getaway" for the first time on BBC Radio 1 before a midnight release of the single on iTunes and Spotify. In May it was announced that Blossoms would play their biggest show to date and support the Stone Roses at Etihad Stadium on 15 June 2016, after Ian Brown became a fan of the band. Once again Blossoms were playing a summer of festivals, being clocked up to 41 festivals by Dewhurst. Blossoms' eponymous debut studio album was released on 5 August with "My Favourite Room" and "Honey Sweet" being released to pre-orders early as singles. It was met with mostly favourable reviews and peaked at the top of the UK Albums Chart in its first week, giving Blossoms their first number-one album. Blossoms featured on the August cover of NME magazine. An autumn tour to support the album release also sold out including a performance at the Plaza Cinema, Stockport at midnight on the day of the album's release.

On 9 September 2017, Blossoms performed at Manchester Arena as part of We Are Manchester, an event to mark the reopening of the venue following a terrorist suicide bombing there three months prior.

=== 2018–2019: Cool Like You ===
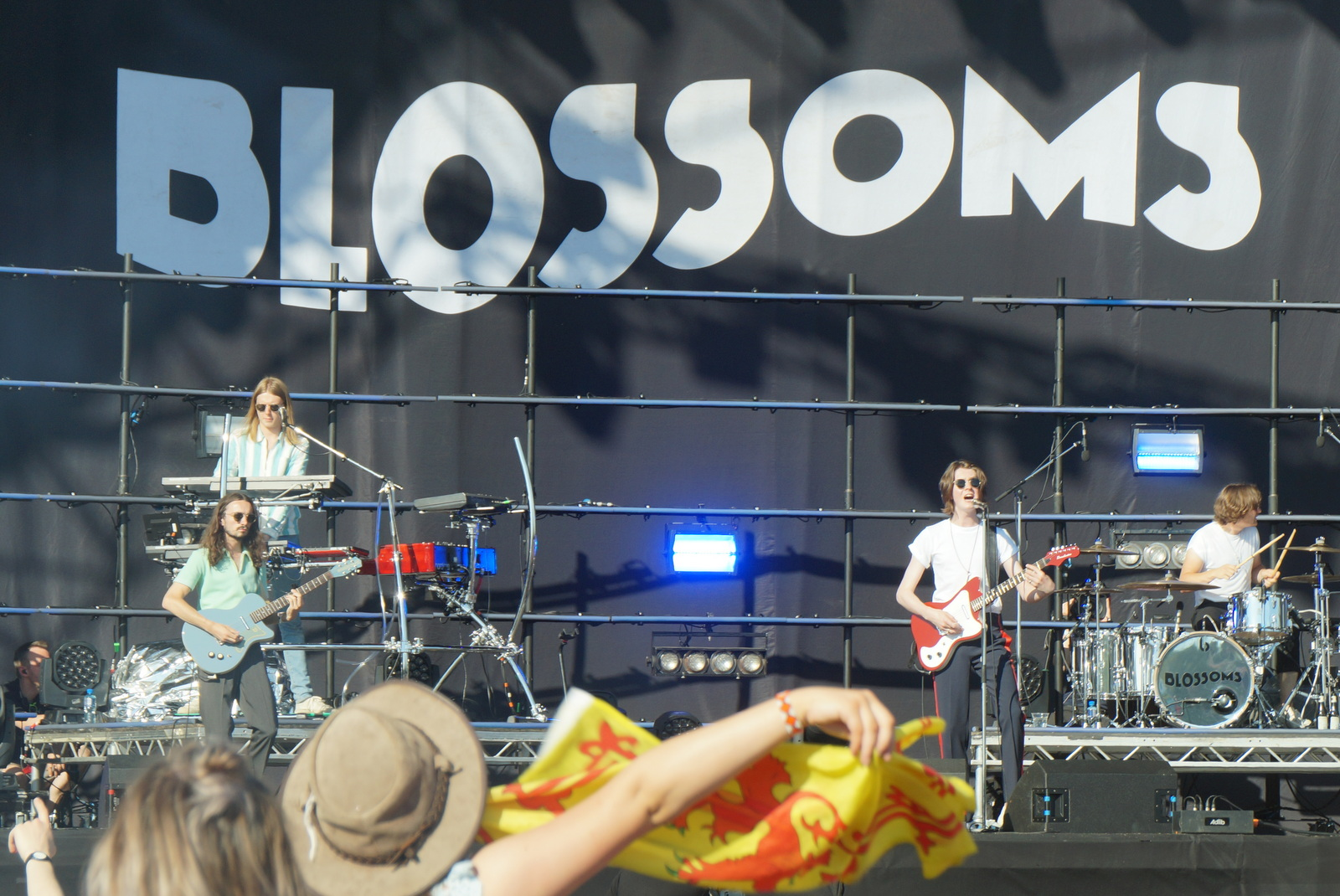
Blossoms performing at TRNSMT in Glasgow, Scotland, 2018

Cool Like You was their second studio album. It was released in the United Kingdom on 27 April 2018, by Virgin EMI Records. The album was produced by James Skelly and Rich Turvey. It peaked at No. 4 on the UK Albums Chart, and at number-one on the Official Vinyl Albums Chart. The band subsequently followed up the album's release with a UK tour which was sold out, including a night at the O_{2} Apollo Manchester in Manchester and three shows at the Plaza in Stockport. After playing some festivals in the summer, Blossoms announced another UK tour for December, including two nights at the Victoria Warehouse in Old Trafford and the Brixton Academy in London. The entire tour sold out within minutes on the day tickets went on sale.

In June 2019 Blossoms played a homecoming concert at Stockport County F.C.'s home ground Edgeley Park, selling out every ticket in under an hour.

=== 2020–2021: Foolish Loving Spaces ===
The band released their third studio album, Foolish Loving Spaces, on 31 January 2020. Preceded by the singles "Your Girlfriend", "The Keeper" and "If You Think This Is Real Life", it went to number-one on the UK Albums Chart. In November 2020, they premiered a 90-minute long documentary film entitled "Blossoms: Back to Stockport" on YouTube and Amazon Prime.

In April 2021 they made national headlines when they were announced as headlining a one-day "trial" festival at Sefton Park on 2 May that year. The festival was notable as the first major festival in the UK for 14 months with no social distancing or face masks, following the worldwide COVID-19 pandemic. In September 2021, they teamed up with Rick Astley, performing cover versions of the Smiths' songs. The band announced further performances with Astley on 8 and 9 October 2021 and went on to play with him at the Glastonbury Festival 2023.

=== 2022–2023: Ribbon Around the Bomb ===
Blossoms performing at the O_{2} Academy Islington in London, 2022

The band released their fourth studio album, Ribbon Around the Bomb, on 29 April 2022. It reached number-one on the UK Albums Chart, their third time achieving this. The album was accompanied by a film based around the album, which was premiered at the Plaza in Stockport alongside a live playthrough of the full album.

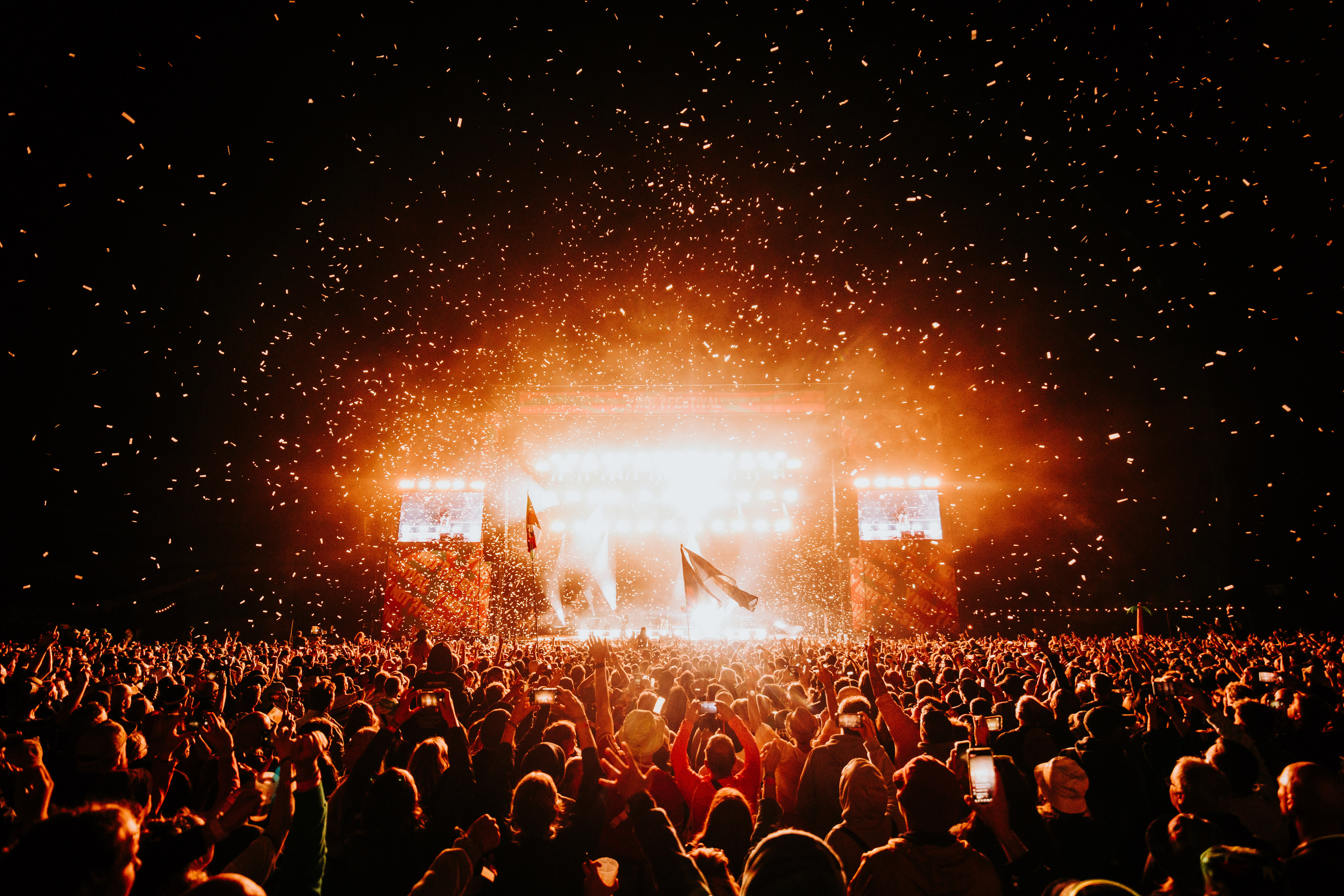
Blossoms performing their headline set on the closing night at Y Not Festival in Pikehall, Derbyshire, 2022

They went on to play a multitude of festivals the following summer, including headline slots at Y Not Festival, Neighbourhood Weekender and Truck Festival. At that year's Glastonbury Festival, the band brought out Melanie C to perform a rendition of "Spice Up Your Life" by the Spice Girls. This was followed by a UK Tour in November and December, ending with four nights at the O_{2} Apollo Manchester.

In the summer of 2023, the band played headline shows at Castlefield Bowl in Manchester and Millennium Square in Leeds, alongside headline slots at Kendal Calling, where their set was introduced by future Prime Minister Andy Burnham, and The Big Feastival.

=== 2024–2026: Gary ===
On 7 October 2023, Blossoms released the single "To Do List (After the Breakup)" featuring Stockport musician Findlay, which was their first release on their independent label ODD SK Recordings, having left Virgin EMI Records.

On 2 November 2023, Blossoms announced their biggest ever headline show at Wythenshawe Park, Manchester on 25 August 2024, including support acts Inhaler, Shed Seven, the K's, Seb Lowe and Ttrruuces. The show was met with critical acclaim, and was followed by a video teaser for the upcoming Oasis reunion.

The band's fifth studio album, Gary, was released on 20 September 2024 and was number-one on the UK Albums Chart a week later. It was preceded by the singles "What Can I Say After I'm Sorry", "Gary", "Perfect Me" and "I Like Your Look". Produced by James Skelly and Josh Lloyd-Watson, the album is named after an 8-foot (2.4 m) fibreglass gorilla that was stolen from a Lanarkshire garden centre in early 2023.

The band then embarked on a UK Tour, which concluded with a five-night Manchester residency, performing at five different venues including Manchester Academy, The Ritz, Albert Hall, Victoria Warehouse and the O_{2} Apollo. The majority of these dates sold out within an hour of tickets going on sale. Support acts for these dates included Red Rum Club, the K's and the Lottery Winners.

The band performed on the Woodsies Stage at Glastonbury Festival 2025, during which they brought out the Irish musician CMAT to perform "I Like Your Look". However, the set was cut short by a few minutes due to the generator going down.

=== 2026–present: Songs from the Wedding Cake ===
On 20 April 2026, the single "Joke About Divorce" was premiered on BBC Radio 1, with a music video starring Callum Scott Howells releasing on the same day. The track was produced by Shawn Lee, and is set to be the lead single off the band's sixth studio album.

The band made a cameo appearance in the British romantic comedy film Finding Emily (2026), whose soundtrack includes songs "There's a Reason Why (I Never Returned Your Calls)" and "Love Talk".

On 18 June 2026, the band announced their sixth studio album Songs from the Wedding Cake, which was released on 2 October 2026, alongside the announcement of the band's first arena tour with support from the Royston Club. The album debuted at number-one on the UK Albums Chart.

To celebrate 10 years of their self-titled debut album, the band played an intimate show at the Deaf Institute in Manchester on 5 August 2026 playing the album in full, which was recorded for a deluxe "Live at the Deaf Institute" edition of Songs from the Wedding Cake.

They appeared on Sky One's Saturday Night Live UK (SNL UK) on 25 October 2026, performing two songs.

== Members ==
Current members

- Tom Ogden – lead vocals, rhythm guitar, piano, harmonica (2013–present)
- Charlie Salt – bass guitar, guitar, backing vocals (2013–present)
- Josh Dewhurst – lead guitar, percussion (2013–present)
- Joe Donovan – drums (2013–present)
- Myles Kellock – keyboards, synthesizer, piano (2013–present); backing vocals (2013–2020, 2025)

Touring musicians

- Collette Williams – percussion, backing vocals (2020–present); guitar, piano (2024–present)
- John Simm – percussion (2020–present)
- Dan Woolfie – guitar (2020–present, select shows and tours); percussion (2023, substitute for Collette Williams); bass guitar (2025, substitute for Charlie Salt)
- Jake Fletcher – guitar, piano, backing vocals (2026–present)

Former touring musicians

- Charles De Cabarrus – guitar (2018–2019)
- Ryan Ellis – guitar (2020–2025)

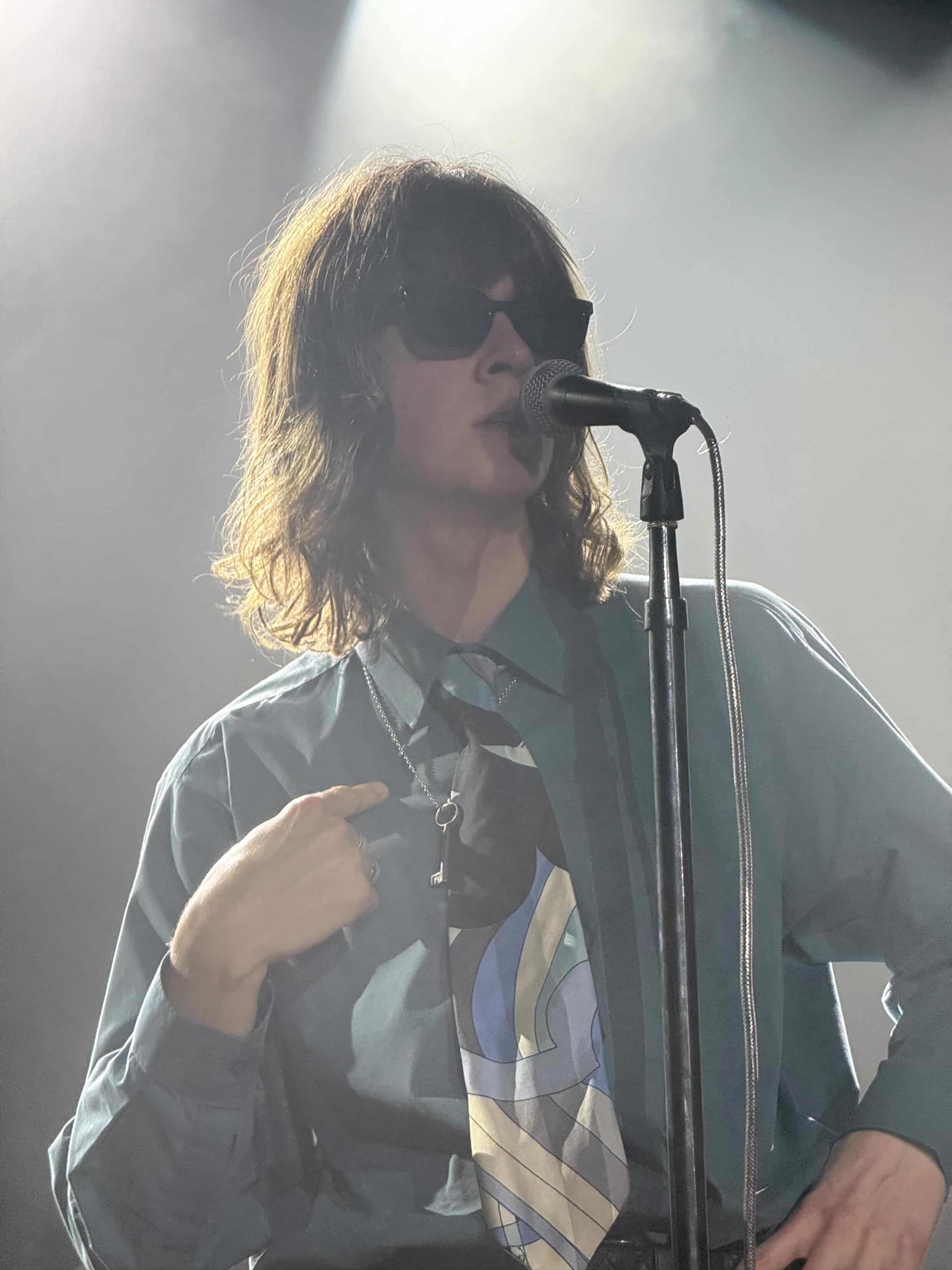
Tom Ogden (lead vocals, rhythm guitar, piano, harmonica) performing in 2026

Charlie Salt (bass guitar, guitar, backing vocals) performing in 2025

Josh Dewhurst (lead guitar, percussion) performing in 2024

Joe Donovan (drums) performing in 2024

Myles Kellock (keyboards, synthesizer, piano) performing in 2024

== Discography ==
- Blossoms (2016)
- Cool Like You (2018)
- Foolish Loving Spaces (2020)
- Ribbon Around the Bomb (2022)
- Gary (2024)
- Songs from the Wedding Cake (2026)
