= Charlemagne (song) =

Single by Blossoms

from the album Blossoms
- Released: 5 October 2015
- Length: 2:46
- Label: Virgin EMI
- Songwriters: Tom Ogden; Charlie Salt; Josh Dewhurst; Joe Donovan; Myles Kellock
- Producers: James Skelly; Rich Turvey

Blossoms singles chronology
"Blown Rose" (2015)	"Charlemagne" (2015)	"At Most a Kiss" (2016)

Music video
- "Charlemagne" on YouTube

"Charlemagne" is a song written and recorded by the English indie rock band Blossoms. The song was released as a digital download in the United Kingdom on 5 October 2015 by Virgin EMI Records as the fourth single from their eponymous debut studio album, and the only single from their extended play (EP) of the same name. It was written by the band, and produced by James Skelly with Rich Turvey. The song has peaked at No. 98 on the UK singles chart and No. 38 on the Scottish Singles Chart.

== Music video ==
A music video to accompany the release of "Charlemagne" was first released onto YouTube on 29 June 2016 at a total length of 2:51.

== Track listing ==
Digital download
No.	Title	Length
1.	"Charlemagne"	2:46

Digital download – Lindstrøm Remix
No.	Title	Length
1.	"Charlemagne" (Lindstrøm Remix)	6:26

Digital download – Nicolas Haelg Remix
No.	Title	Length
1.	"Charlemagne" (Nicolas Haelg Remix)	2:45

Digital download – Jack Wins Remix
No.	Title	Length
1.	"Charlemagne" (Jack Wins Remix)	5:03

== Charts ==
Chart (2016)	Peak position
Finland Airplay (Radiosoittolista)	96
Scottish Singles Sales (Official Charts)	38
UK Singles (Official Charts)	98

== Certifications ==
Region	Certification	Certified units/sales
United Kingdom (BPI)	2× Platinum	1,200,000^{‡}
^{‡} Sales+streaming figures based on certification alone.

== Release history ==
Region	Date	Format	Label
United Kingdom	5 October 2015	Digital download	Virgin EMI
United Kingdom	1 August 2016	Digital download	Virgin EMI
United Kingdom	5 August 2016	Digital download	Virgin EMI
