= Tom Ogden =

English musician (born 1993)

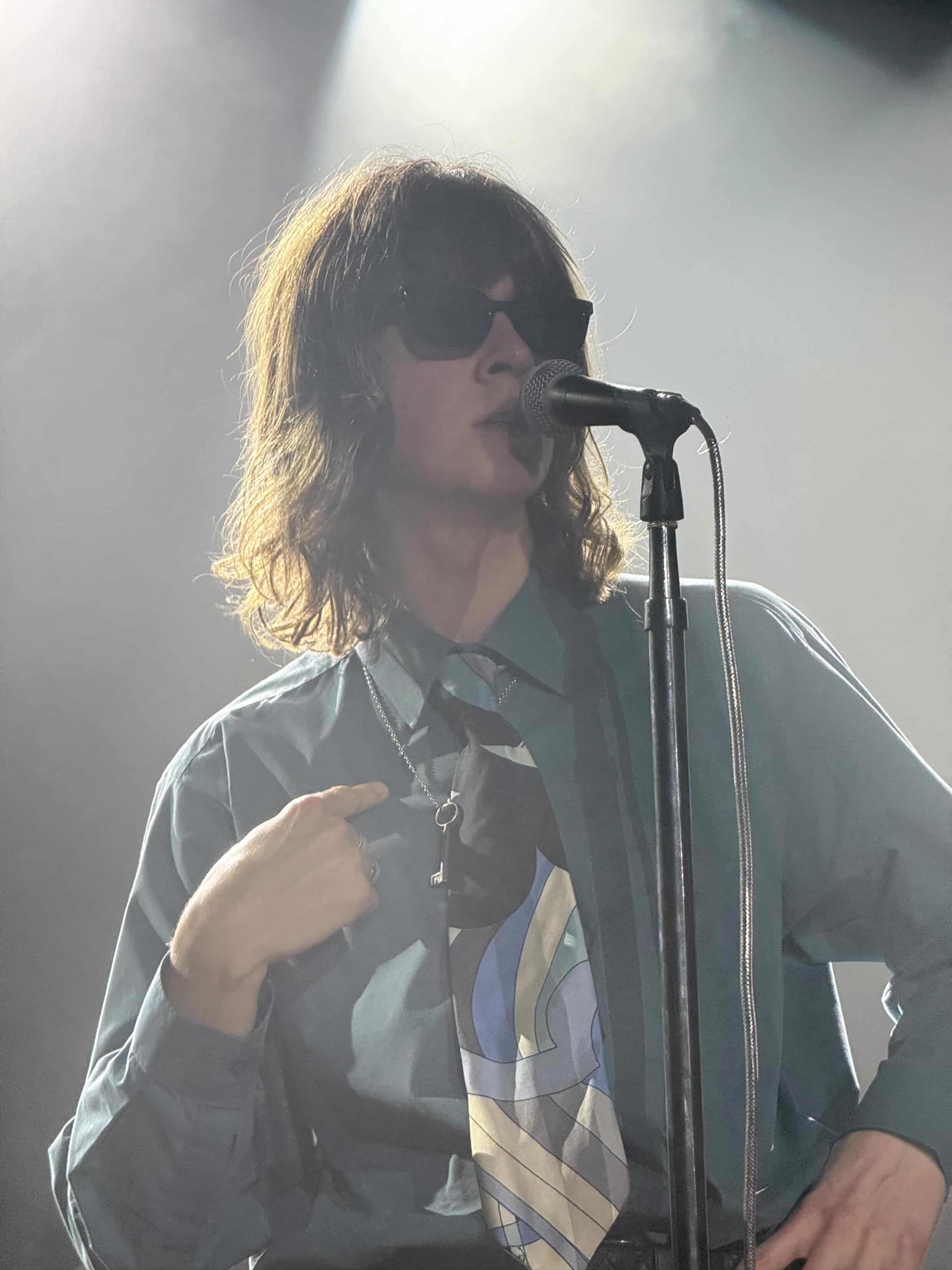
- Ogden performing in Zürich, Switzerland, 2026
- Born: Thomas Ogden; 28 April 1993 (age 33); Stockport, Greater Manchester, England
- Occupations: Musician; singer; songwriter
- Years active: 2009–present
- Spouse: Katie Donovan (m. 2021)
- Musical career
- Genres: Indie pop; indie rock; synth-pop; alternative rock; new wave
- Instruments: Vocals; guitar; piano
- Member of: Blossoms
- Formerly of: Save the Mastersound

Thomas Ogden (born 28 April 1993) is an English musician, singer and songwriter. He is best known as the lead vocalist and primary songwriter of the English indie pop band Blossoms, which he co-founded in 2013.

== Early life ==
Tom Ogden was born on 28 April 1993 at Stepping Hill Hospital in Stockport. Ogden has a brother, Ewan, who is a photographer that frequently works with Blossoms. He is the cousin of actor Daniel Rigby.

He attended Stockport School, and met bandmate Joe Donovan on a school trip to Alton Towers. He later attended Cheadle College.

He wrote his first ever song when he was in Year 8 at school about the World Cup. He learnt to play the piano at school and is self-taught at guitar.

== Career ==
=== Pre-Blossoms ===
Ogden was part of a band called The Kinky Fridays in which Joe Donovan was the drummer. In 2009, Ogden formed the band Save The Mastersound with his friend Kyle Ross. The band lasted three and a half years before splitting in April 2013.

=== Blossoms ===
Since 2013, Ogden has been part of the band Blossoms alongside Josh Dewhurst, Joe Donovan, Myles Kellock and Charlie Salt. Ogden is the primary songwriter in the group, contributing lead vocals, guitars and keyboards. The band have released six studio albums, five of which have reached number one in the UK Albums Chart.

=== Other musical ventures ===
Ogden has songwriting credits on Miles Kane's 2023 album "One Man Band", co-writing and providing backing vocals on the tracks "Troubled Son", "The Wonder" and "Heal" with Kane.

He was a member of the UK Jury for the Eurovision Song Contest 2025, alongside Liz McClarnon, Afrodeutsche, Mark Lippmann and Carl Parris.

=== Business ventures ===
Ogden and his wife Katie opened Bohemian Arts Club in Stockport in May 2023, housing a hair salon on the ground floor and a cocktail bar across the first and second floors, inspired by the pair's experiences of bars they visited whilst touring with Blossoms. On September 2025, it was announced that the cocktail bar would close in order to allow the salon to expand. The bar's final day of operation was on 3 October 2025.

== Personal life ==
Ogden married Katie Donovan, sister of bandmate Joe Donovan, in August 2021 at Stockport Town Hall.

He is a lifelong supporter of Manchester City F.C.

== Discography ==
=== Blossoms ===
- Blossoms (2016)
- Cool Like You (2018)
- Foolish Loving Spaces (2020)
- Ribbon Around The Bomb (2022)
- Gary (2024)
- Songs from the Wedding Cake (2026)

=== Collaborations ===
- Miles Kane – One Man Band (2023) – co-writer and backing vocalist on "Troubled Son", "The Wonder" and "Heal"
