= James Skelly =

English musician (born 1980)

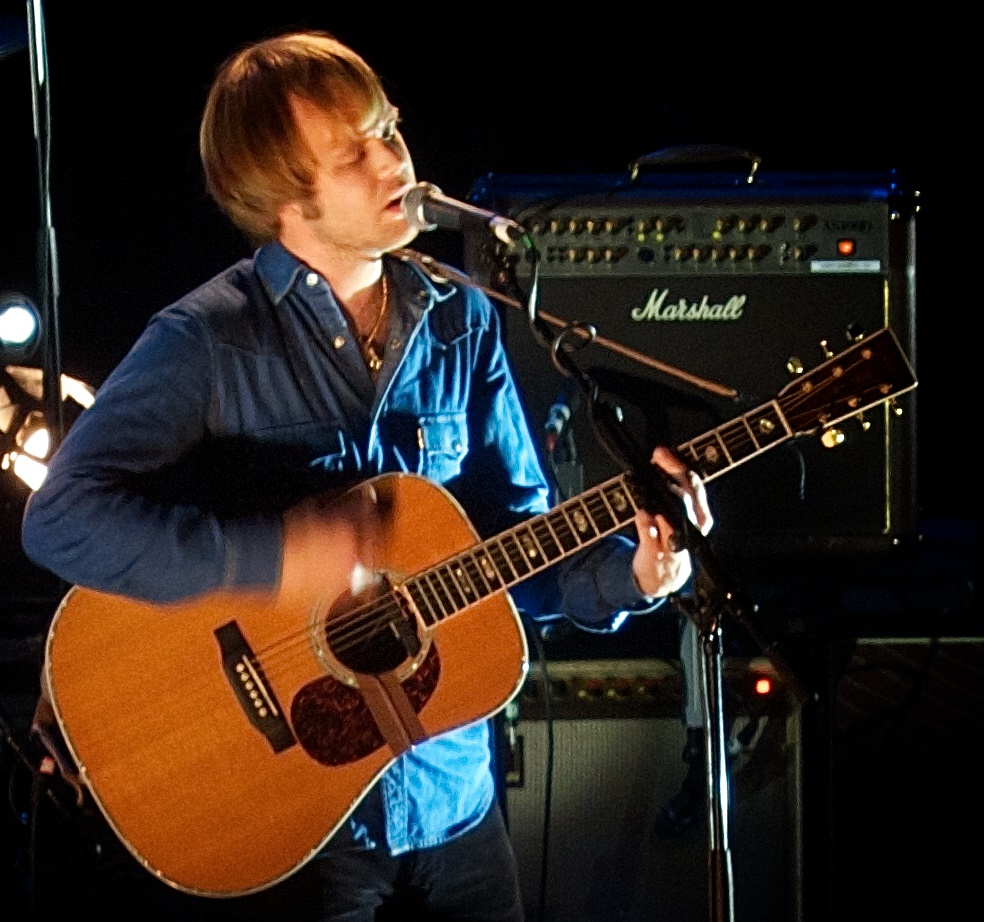
- Live with The Coral, Shepherds Bush Empire 2010

Background information
- Born: James Alexander Skelly; 16 August 1980 (age 46); Birkenhead, Merseyside, England
- Genres: Alternative rock; indie rock
- Occupations: Musician; singer; songwriter; record producer
- Instruments: Vocals; guitar; percussion
- Years active: 1996–present
- Label: Skeleton Key
- Website: jamesskellyandtheintenders.com

James Alexander Skelly (born 16 August 1980) is an English musician who is the frontman of The Coral. He embarked on a solo career when the band went on indefinite hiatus in 2012. The band regrouped in 2015. Skelly is the cousin of fellow musician Miles Kane.

Skelly released his debut solo album, Love Undercover, in June 2013 on Skeleton Key Records, a label he co-founded with Neville Skelly and brother Ian. Skelly was backed by The Intenders, made up of Ian Skelly, Paul Duffy, Nick Power, and former members of Tramp Attack and The Sundowners. Skelly has also gone into record production, working with artists including Blossoms, She Drew The Gun, Cut Glass Kings (previously The Circles), and The Sundowners.

== Discography ==
=== Albums ===
- Love Undercover (June 2013), Skeleton Key Records
