= Courteeners discography =

- The Courteeners
- Studio albums: 7
- EPs: 4
- Live albums: 1
- Compilation albums: 1
- Singles: 25
- Video albums: 1

The discography of English rock band Courteeners consists of seven studio albums, four EPs, 19 singles and one DVD album.

== Albums ==
=== Studio albums ===
List of studio albums, with selected chart positions and certifications
Title	Album details	Peak chart positions				Certifications
Title	Album details	UK	UK Indie	IRE	SCO	Certifications
St. Jude	Released: 7 April 2008; Label: Polydor; Format: CD, CS, DL, LP	1	—	—	3	BPI: Platinum
Falcon	Released: 22 February 2010; Label: A&M; Format: CD, DL, LP	6	—	52	7	BPI: Gold
Anna	Released: 4 February 2013; Label: V2, Cooperative Music; Format: CD, DL, LP	6	38	85	7	BPI: Silver
Concrete Love	Released: 18 August 2014; Label: Cooperative Music; Format: CD, CD+DVD-V, DL, LP	3	1	—	4	BPI: Gold
Mapping the Rendezvous	Released: 21 October 2016; Label: Ignition; Format: CD, CS, DL, LP	4	1	—	1	BPI: Gold
More. Again. Forever.	Released: 17 January 2020; Label: Ignition; Format: CD, CS, DL, LP	2	1	—	1	
Pink Cactus Café	Released: 25 October 2024; Label: Ignition; Format: CD, CS, DL, LP	2	1	—	2	
"—" denotes a release that did not chart or was not released in that territory.

=== Compilations ===
List of compilation albums
Title	Details	Peak chart positions
Title	Details	UK
God Bless the Band	Released: 28 August 2026; Label: Ignition; Formats: CD, CS, DL, LP	2

=== Live albums ===
List of live albums
Title	Details
Live in Manchester	Released: 12 December 2025; Label: Ignition; Formats: DL, LP

=== Other albums ===
List of other albums, with selected chart positions and certifications
Title	Album details	Peak chart positions			Certifications
Title	Album details	UK	UK Indie	SCO	Certifications
St. Jude: Re:Wired	Released: 7 April 2018; Label: Ignition; Format: CD, CS, DL, LP	5	2	5	BPI: Silver

== EPs ==
Title	EP details
Here Come the Young Men	Released: 16 January 2008 (Japan Only); Label: Loog; Format: CD
Live at Manchester Apollo	Released: 10 October 2008; Label: Universal; Format: DL
Take Over the World	Released: 25 April 2010; Label: Polydor; Format: CD, DL
Electric Lick	Released: 6 December 2010; Label: Polydor; Format: CD, DL, LP
How Good It Was	Released: 21 July 2014; Label: Cooperative Music; Format: CD, DL, LP

== Singles ==
Title	Year	Peak chart positions			Certifications	Album
Title	Year	UK	UK Indie	SCO	Certifications	Album
"Cavorting"	2007	192	4	18	BPI: Silver	St. Jude
"Acrylic"	2007	44	—	17	BPI: Silver	Non-album single
"What Took You So Long?"	2008	20	—	7	BPI: Silver	St. Jude
"Not Nineteen Forever"	2008	19	—	10	BPI: 2× Platinum	St. Jude
"No You Didn't, No You Don't"	2008	35	—	6	BPI: Silver	St. Jude
"That Kiss"	2008	36	—	4		Non-album single
"Cross My Heart & Hope to Fly"	2009	— (Note: "Cross My Heart & Hope to Fly" did not enter the UK Singles Chart, but peaked at number 52 on the UK Physical Singles Chart.)	—	—		Falcon
"You Overdid It Doll"	2010	28	—	24		Falcon
"Take Over the World"	2010	114	—	—		Falcon
"Lose Control"	2012	82	—	79		Anna
"Van Der Graaff"	2013	— (Note: "Van Der Graaff" did not enter the UK Singles Chart, but peaked at number two on the UK Physical Singles Chart.)	—	—		Anna
"Are You in Love with a Notion?"	2013	— (Note: "Are You in Love with a Notion?" did not enter the UK Singles Chart, but peaked at number nine on the UK Physical Singles Chart.)	31	—	BPI: Gold	Anna
"Summer"	2014	104	12	98	BPI: Silver	Concrete Love
"How Good It Was"	2014	66	4	42		Concrete Love
"Winter Wonderland"	2015	— (Note: "Winter Wonderland" did not enter the UK Singles Chart, but peaked at number five on the UK Physical Singles Chart.)	49	—		Non-album single
"The 17th"	2016	— (Note: "The 17th" did not enter the UK Singles Chart, but peaked at number 51 on the UK Single Sales Chart.)	10	38		Mapping the Rendezvous
"No One Will Ever Replace Us"	2016	—	—	—		Mapping the Rendezvous
"Heavy Jacket"	2019	—	—	—		More. Again. Forever.
"Better Man"	2019	—	—	—		More. Again. Forever.
"Hanging Off Your Cloud"	2020	—	22	—		More. Again. Forever.
"Solitude of the Night Bus"	2024	—	—	—		Pink Cactus Café
"Pink Cactus Café"	2024	—	—	—		Pink Cactus Café
"Sweet Surrender" (feat. Brooke Combe)	2024	—	—	—		Pink Cactus Café
"The Beginning of the End" (feat. DMA's)	2024	—	—	—		Pink Cactus Café
"The Luckiest Man Alive"	2026	—	—	—		God Bless the Band
"—" denotes a recording that did not chart or was not released in that territory.

== Other charted and certified songs ==
Title	Year	Certifications	Album
"Bide Your Time"	2008	BPI: Silver	St. Jude

== Video albums ==
- Live at the MEN Arena (12 December 2011)
