= God Bless the Band =

Greatest hits album by Courteeners
- Released: 28 August 2026
- Recorded: 2007–2026
- Studio: Various
- Genre: Indie rock
- Label: Ignition

Courteeners chronology
| Pink Cactus Café (2024) | God Bless the Band (2026) |

Singles from God Bless the Band
- 1. "The Luckiest Man Alive" Released: 9 April 2026; 2. "Plus One Forever" Released: 7 July 2026

God Bless the Band is a greatest hits album by English indie rock band Courteeners. It was released on 28 August 2026 by Ignition Music. The standard version of the album includes tracks from the band's first seven albums, St. Jude (2008), Falcon (2010), Anna (2013), Concrete Love (2014), Mapping the Rendezvous (2016), More. Again. Forever. (2020) and Pink Cactus Café (2024), plus two previously unreleased tracks, "The Luckiest Man Alive" and "Plus One Forever", the former of which was released as a single the same day as the announcement of the album, alongside a UK arena tour and an intimate show at Night and Day Café, on 28 August 2026.

== Track listing ==
| No. | Title | Album | Length |
|---|---|---|---|
| 1. | "Are You in Love with a Notion?" | Anna (2013) |
| 2. | "Cavorting" (remastered 2022) | St. Jude (2008) |
| 3. | "Acrylic" | Non-album single (2007) |
| 4. | "You Overdid It Doll" | Falcon (2010) |
| 5. | "Pink Cactus Café" | Pink Cactus Café (2024) |
| 6. | "Summer" | Concrete Love (2014) |
| 7. | "Take Over the World" | Falcon (2010) |
| 8. | "Bide Your Time" (remastered 2022) | St. Jude (2008) |
| 9. | "Small Bones" | Concrete Love (2014) |
| 10. | "The 17th" | Mapping the Rendezvous (2016) |
| 11. | "Fallowfield Hillbilly" (remastered 2022) | St. Jude (2008) |
| 12. | "That Kiss" | Non-album single (2008) |
| 13. | "Lose Control" | Anna (2013) |
| 14. | "Modern Love" | Mapping the Rendezvous (2016) |
| 15. | "Sycophant" | Falcon (2010) |
| 16. | "Hanging Off Your Cloud" | More. Again. Forever. (2020) |
| 17. | "The Luckiest Man Alive" | New song |
| 18. | "What Took You So Long?" (remastered 2022) | St. Jude (2008) |
| 19. | "Not Nineteen Forever" (remastered 2022) | St. Jude (2008) |
| 20. | "Plus One Forever" | New song |

Deluxe edition
| No. | Title | Album | Length |
|---|---|---|---|
| 1. | "Sweet Surrender" | Pink Cactus Cafe (2024) |
| 2. | "Chipping Away" | B-side to Lose Control (2012) |
| 3. | "Smiths Disco" | B-side to Not Nineteen Forever (2008) |
| 4. | "Sunflower" | B-side to How Good It Was (2014) |
| 5. | "Winter Wonderland" | Non-album single (2015) |
| 6. | "The Rest of the World Has Gone Home" | Falcon (2010) |
| 7. | "International" (acoustic) | Concrete Love (2014) |
| 8. | "Beautiful Head" | Concrete Love (2014) |
| 9. | "More. Again. Forever." | More. Again. Forever. (2020) |
| 10. | "20th Century Boy / Cigarettes & Alcohol" (BBC Radio 2 Session – live at Glastonbury) | Previously unreleased, recorded in 2017 |
| 11. | "Here Come the Young Men" | Anna (2013) |

== Charts ==
Chart performance for God Bless the Band
| Chart (2026) | Peak position |
|---|---|
| Scottish Albums (Official Charts) | 2 |
| UK Albums (Official Charts) | 2 |
| UK Independent Albums (Official Charts) | 1 |
