= Liam Fray =

English musician (born 1985)

- Fray with the Courteeners performing at the Oxegen 2008 festival

Background information
- Born: Liam James Fray; 15 May 1985 (age 41); Middleton, Greater Manchester, England
- Genres: Indie rock; acoustic rock; post-Britpop; post-punk revival; synth-pop
- Occupations: Musician; singer-songwriter
- Instruments: Vocals; guitar
- Years active: 2005–present
- Labels: Polydor; PIAS Cooperative

Liam James Fray (born 15 May 1985) is an English musician, best known as the founder and frontman of Manchester-based indie rock band Courteeners, which was formed in 2006. Fray hails from Middleton, Greater Manchester and he references his hometown in multiple songs.

== Background ==
Liam James Fray was born on 15 May 1985 in Middleton, Greater Manchester into a family of teachers. Fray went to school with the three other members of the Courteeners whom he has known since he was 10. He has an older sister, Laura.

Other Manchester bands such as the Smiths and Oasis inspired Fray to write and form the band. "Noel [Gallagher]'s the reason why I picked up the guitar when I was 11-years-old – trying to learn 'Wonderwall'", admitted Fray.

First he studied economics, then creative writing at the University of Salford. He ended up leaving in his second year, when the band started to take off. In 2015, he received an Honorary Doctorate of Arts at a graduation ceremony for the University. In December 2025, Fray was awarded Fellowship of the Royal Northern College of Music in Manchester.

== Career ==
Fray wrote future Courteeners' songs "Not Nineteen Forever" and "Cavorting" during his time at university while working in Manchester's Fred Perry clothes shop and frequently performed at open mic nights as an acoustic singer-songwriter. "I've been gigging since 2005 – I did a year on my own – and in the summer of '06 we [members of the Courteeners] got together and started gigging properly around Christmas."

All the music and lyrics for Courteeners' songs are written by Fray; he claims they are wholly autobiographical. Ex-the Smiths guitarist Johnny Marr once called Fray "an underrated lyricist".

With Courteeners, he has released six studio albums. All of them went Top 10 in the UK Albums Chart; St. Jude (2008) and Falcon (2010) achieved Gold status. The band have achieved their highest chart position so far with their sixth studio album More. Again. Forever. (2020) peaking at No. 2. On 27 May 2017, the band played their biggest headline gig to 50,000 people at Manchester's Emirates Old Trafford.

Aside from the band, Fray also performs acoustic solo shows, playing band's songs. Alone in 2013 he completed two sold-out UK tours. He performed a special solo set at Neighbourhood Festival, the Albert Hall, Manchester on 8 October 2016. Fray then went on to complete a sold out acoustic tour in November/December 2017 alongside Adam Payne, including three sets at the Manchester Albert Hall in the space of 2 days.

Fray also painted the cover artwork for Courteeners' debut album St. Jude (2008), which features Audrey Hepburn. He has appeared twice on the cover of NME magazine, one as an individual and the other with Courteeners.

His favourite artists are the Beatles, the Smiths, Oasis, Stephen Fretwell, Elbow, the National, and the Yeah Yeah Yeahs.

His favourite song is The Ground Beneath Your Feet by Stephen Fretwell on his album Man On The Roof.

Fray uses a cherry Epiphone Riviera electric guitar with a frequensator tailpiece (his main live guitar in the St. Jude (2008) era), G6136DC Gretsch White Falcon Double Cutaway electric guitar (appeared in Falcon (2010) era, main in Anna (2013), Concrete Love (2014) eras), and Gibson Hummingbird acoustic guitar, amongst others.

== Discography ==
Studio albums

- St. Jude (2008)
- Falcon (2010)
- Anna (2013)
- Concrete Love (2014)
- Mapping the Rendezvous (2016)
- More. Again. Forever. (2020)
- Pink Cactus Café (2024)
