= Mapping the Rendezvous =

Studio album by Courteeners
- Released: 28 October 2016
- Recorded: 2016
- Genre: Dance-rock
- Length: 41:16
- Label: Ignition
- Producer: Joe Cross

Courteeners chronology
Concrete Love (2014)	Mapping the Rendezvous (2016)	More. Again. Forever. (2020)

Singles from Mapping the Rendezvous
- 1. "The 17th" Released: 12 August 2016; 2. "No One Will Ever Replace Us" Released: 12 September 2016; 3. "Kitchen" Released: 4 October 2016; 4. "Modern Love" Released: 26 May 2017

Mapping the Rendezvous is the fifth studio album by British rock band Courteeners, released on 28 October 2016. The album was announced in August while "The 17th" was made available on streaming platforms. In November the band embarked on a UK/European tour in support of the album.

== Background ==
Courteeners released their fourth studio album Concrete Love in August 2014, peaking at number three in the UK Albums Chart. It was promoted with two tours of the United Kingdom, various festivals (including Isle of Wight, Glastonbury, T in the Park), and a one-off show at Heaton Park in Manchester to a crowd of 25,000. Following this, bassist Mark Cupello left the band in December 2015 and was replaced by their previous producer Joe Cross. They spent two weeks in Loch Ness, Scotland at a converted chapel, where they demoed new material. Following a month break, they re-listened to the material, which frontman Liam Fray deemed "good but it wasn’t great".

The songs that would end up on their next album were written in Paris, France, with Fray citing the film Victoria (2015) by Sebastian Schipper as the lyrical inspiration. Cross and Fray had spent six weeks in the city; they set up a tiny studio in the apartment they were staying in. Fray said he admired the romanticism involved with France, where he was an unknown person, allowing him to take his time writing. Cross produced Mapping the Rendezvous with assistance from Patrick Phillips. Sessions were held in Real World Studios in Bath, and unnamed places in Loch Ness and Manchester, concluding in July 2016. Cenzo Townshend mixed the recordings, before the album was mastered by Robin Schmidt.

== Composition ==
Mapping the Rendezvous is a dance-rock album; AllMusic reviewer Neil Z. Yeung noted that as with their contemporaries Kaiser Chiefs and Two Door Cinema Club, Courteeners had "evolved from their indie rock early days, favoring melody and pop-leaning numbers that inspire more dancing than rocking out". Fray described it as a party album that also deals with regret. Discussing the album's overall theme, Fray said it was akin to "making bad decisions. Or not thinking too much about the consequences". Describing the influence of Victoria, Fray saw it as "one snapshot of a big night out. It’s romantic, it’s sad, you’re making bad decisions, you regret it in the morning, you do it all again the next night". Alongside to the band, they had a variety of additional musicians contribute to the recordings: Richard McVeigh on trombone, Katherine Curlett on trumpet, Luz Hanks on cello, Emma Richards on viola and Natalie and John Purton on violin.

Mapping the Rendezvous opens with "Lucifer's Dreams", a dance-rock song that evokes the work of Kaiser Chiefs, and is followed by the 1975-lite "Kitchen", a funk rock song that cribs "Sex & Drugs & Rock & Roll" (1977) by Ian Dury. "No One Will Ever Replace Us" deals with falling in love at Glastonbury Festival, as well as the "under-pinning fear about when you’ve got something so good, and you don’t want it to end". With "De La Salle", which was named after a school of the same name and apes the work of Morrissey, Fray contemplates if monks from the 17th century were celebrities in their time. "Tip Toes" is about a person being in love with a best friend from an early age, who would later regret not doing anything about the situation. Sonia de Freitas of Renowned for Sound said "Not for Tomorrow" was "particularly exciting because of the contrasting styles they blend together, and the unexpected rhythmic stabs will get your heart ticking". "The Dilettante" has Fray imagining his life married to a French woman.

"Finest Hour" is a slow-building track, the end of which is reminiscent of "The Universal" (1995) by Blur. The Phoenix-esqie "Modern Love" is the first time Fray had co-written a song with someone, in this case, with Adam Anderson and Theo Hutchcraft of Hurts. Fray and the other members of Courteeners had been friends with the pair for over a decade. Anderson and Hutchcraft had sent a version of the song to Cross, which they were not satisfied with; after Fray heard it, he added guitar parts and altered some of its lyrics. "Most Important" mixes "Lullaby" from their second studio album Falcon (2010) with the drum pattern of "Maps" (2003) by Yeah Yeah Yeahs. The album's closing track "The 17th" had the most direct influence of Victoria, as it comes across as a mix of LCD Soundsystem and Prince. Louder Than War referred to it as a "monstrously huge pop song that wraps itself around a keenly observed lyric about outsider culture and hedonistic escape".

== Release ==
Following recording, the band supported the Stone Roses for a one-off show and appeared at the T in the Park and Reading and Leeds Festivals. On 12 August 2016, Mapping the Rendezvous was announced for release in two months' time; the album's track listing was posted online. "The 17th" was made available for streaming through The Independent's website that same day, before being released as the album's lead single four days later. "No One Will Ever Replace Us" premiered through NME website on 30 August 2016, before released the album's second single on 12 September 2016. "Kitchen" was released the album's third single on 4 October 2016. Three days later, the music video for "No One Will Ever Replace Us" was posted on YouTube. Mapping the Rendezvous was released on 21 October 2016, through Ignition Records. A deluxe edition was released with a DVD of their 2015 Heaton Park performance.

It was promoted with a UK tour the following month, running into December 2016, with support from Cut Up Kid, Milburn and the View. The music video for "Modern Love" was posted online on 10 April 2017, directed by Joe Connor. "The 17th" was released as a twelve-inch vinyl record for Record Store Day, which featured the album version, a radio edit, an acoustic version and two remixes. "Modern Love" was released as the album's fourth and final single on 26 May 2017. The following day, the band performed at home town show at the Emirates Old Trafford in Manchester to a crowd of 50,000, with support from the Charlatans, Blossoms and Cabbage. All of the tickets sold out after three months, and was preceded by two warm-up shows. An acoustic version of "Modern Love" was released on 28 July 2017. Following this, they appeared at that year's Glastonbury Festival and appeared at the We Are Manchester benefit show, which was held for the victims of the Manchester Arena bombing. In October and November 2017, Fray embarked on a solo acoustic tour of the UK.

== Reception ==
Professional ratings
Aggregate scores
Source	Rating
AnyDecentMusic?	6.1/10
Metacritic	69/100
Review scores
Source	Rating
AllMusic	3.5/5 stars
Belfast Telegraph	8/10
The Independent	2/5 stars
NME	3/5 stars
Q	4/5 stars

Mapping the Rendezvous was met with generally favourable reviews from music critics. At Metacritic, the album received an average score of 69, based on six reviews. AnyDecentMusic? gave it an average score of 6.1, based on five reviews.

Yeung praised the band for melding "sonic touchstones from throughout their catalog" to create "one of their strongest works, as addictive as anything" on Concrete Love and their third studio album Anna (2013). Eamon Sweeney of Hot Press felt they "show the strongest signs yet of blossoming into a band who can be taken as seriously as their illustrious musical forefathers". Belfast Telegraph writer Andrew Carless said that the album retained "all the swagger you would expect from the Manchester four-piece, and is a return to form"; Mark Peters of South China Morning Post said this "kind of rock-star swagger [...] grabs headlines and divides music lovers". The Independent's Andy Gill took this to be a negative, stating that the band are "still pretty much mired in Mancunian mores on this latest album". NME writer Barry Nicolson felt they "only made half of a very good album", something that has "plagued" the band since their debut studio album St. Jude (2008).

Mapping the Rendezvous peaked at number four in the UK Albums Chart, topping the Scottish Albums Chart. It was certified silver by the British Phonographic Industry nearly a year after its release, and gold in 2019. "The 17th" peaked at number 17 on the UK Independent Singles Chart and number 38 in Scotland.

== Track listing ==
Track listing per booklet.

No.	Title	Length
1.	"Lucifer's Dreams"	3:27
2.	"Kitchen"	2:55
3.	"No One Will Ever Replace Us"	3:54
4.	"De La Salle"	4:31
5.	"Tip Toes"	3:44
6.	"Not for Tomorrow"	3:28
7.	"Finest Hour"	3:21
8.	"The Dilettante"	3:05
9.	"Modern Love"	3:38
10.	"Most Important"	3:48
11.	"The 17th"	5:25
Total length:		41:16

== Personnel ==
Personnel per booklet.

Courteeners

- Liam Fray – vocals, guitars
- Daniel Moores – guitars
- Joe Cross – bass guitars
- Michael Campbell – drums, backing vocals

Additional musicians

- Richard McVeigh – trombone
- Katherine Curlett – trumpet
- Luz Hanks – cello
- Emma Richards – viola
- Natalie Purton – violin
- John Purton – violin

Production and design

- Joe Cross – producer
- Patrick Phillips – assistance
- Cenzo Townshend – mixing
- Robin Schmidt – mastering
- Laura Fray – art direction
- Robert Watson – front cover photo
- Liam Fray – back cover photo, sleeve photos
- Glyn Roberts – sleeve photos

== Charts and certifications ==
=== Weekly charts ===
Chart performance for Mapping the Rendezvous
Chart (2016)	Peak position
Scottish Albums (OCC)	1
UK Albums (OCC)	4

=== Certifications ===
Certifications for Mapping the Rendezvous
Region	Certification	Certified units/sales
United Kingdom (BPI)	Gold	100,000^{‡}
^{‡} Sales+streaming figures based on certification alone.
