= Dancing at the Edge of the World (album) =

Studio album by Brooke Combe
- Released: 31 January 2025
- Length: 31:40
- Label: Modern Sky UK
- Producer: James Skelly

Brooke Combe chronology
Black Is the New Gold (2023)	Dancing at the Edge of the World (2025)

Singles from Dancing at the Edge of the World
- 1. "Dancing at the Edge of the World" Released: 1 August 2024; 2. "The Last Time" Released: 4 September 2024; 3. "Shaken by the Wind" Released: 24 October 2024; 4. "This Town" Released: 5 December 2024

Dancing at the Edge of the World is the debut studio album by Scottish singer and songwriter Brooke Combe. It was released on 31 January 2025 via Modern Sky UK and follows her 2023 extended play Black Is the New Gold.

== Critical reception ==
Professional ratings
Review scores
Source	Rating
Dork	3/5 stars
The Skinny	4/5 stars

Felicity Jones of Dork awarded the album 3 stars and stated, the album "walks a tightrope between polish and passion." While she praised Combe's talent, saying "when everything clicks – as it does on the effortlessly graceful ‘If I Could Only Be Yours’," she noted that the album "seems afraid to ruffle its own perfectly-pressed clothes," and urges Combe to trust her own blueprint. Jamie Wilde of The Skinny rated the album 4 stars, stating it "shows a maturity far beyond her years" and delivers "ten sumptuous tracks of old-school soul that ooze with the essence of an artist in full bloom", calling it "a varied offering full of soulful tracks."

== Track listing ==
All lyrics are written by Brooke Combe.

Dancing at the Edge of the World track listing
No.	Title	Music	Length
1.	"Prelude"	Combe	0:23
2.	"This Town"	Combe; Danny Murphy	3:03
3.	"Guilt"	Combe; Paul Butler; James Skelly	3:03
4.	"Shaken by the Wind"	Combe; Tom McFarland	2:54
5.	"L.M.T.F.A."	Combe; Jamie Hartman; Murphy	3:07
6.	"The Last Time"	Combe; Murphy	3:20
7.	"Pieces"	Combe; Murphy	3:27
8.	"If I Could Only Be Yours"	Combe; Murphy	3:04
9.	"Lanewood Pines"	Combe; Murphy	2:48
10.	"Butterfly"	Combe; Murphy; Skelly	3:06
11.	"Dancing at the Edge of the World"	Combe; Skelly	3:25
Total length:			31:40

== Personnel ==
- Brooke Combe – vocals (all tracks), keyboards (tracks 2, 4, 6, 8, 11)
- Danny Murphy – guitar (all tracks), background vocals (tracks 2, 6, 8)
- James Skelly – production (all tracks), background vocals (tracks 3, 9, 10)
- Chris Taylor – mixing (all tracks), keyboards (tracks 3, 6, 10)
- Graeme Lynch – mastering
- Charlie Salt – bass guitar (tracks 2–4, 6–11), background vocals (2–4, 9–11)
- Aden Peets – drums (tracks 2–4, 6–11), percussion (2–4, 6, 8, 9)
- Liz Hanks – cello (tracks 2, 4, 7, 9)
- Sean O'Hagan – string arrangement (tracks 2, 4, 7, 9)
- Josie Wells – viola (tracks 2, 4, 7, 9)
- Natalie Purton – violin (tracks 2, 4, 7, 9)
- Paula Smart – violin (tracks 2, 4, 7, 9)
- Will Chadwick – violin (tracks 2, 4, 7, 9)
- Rich Turvey – piano (track 9)

== Charts ==
Chart (2025)	Peak position
Scottish Albums (OCC)	3
UK Albums (OCC)	83
UK Independent Albums (OCC)	4
