= Brooke Combe =

Scottish singer, songwriter and multi-instrumentalist

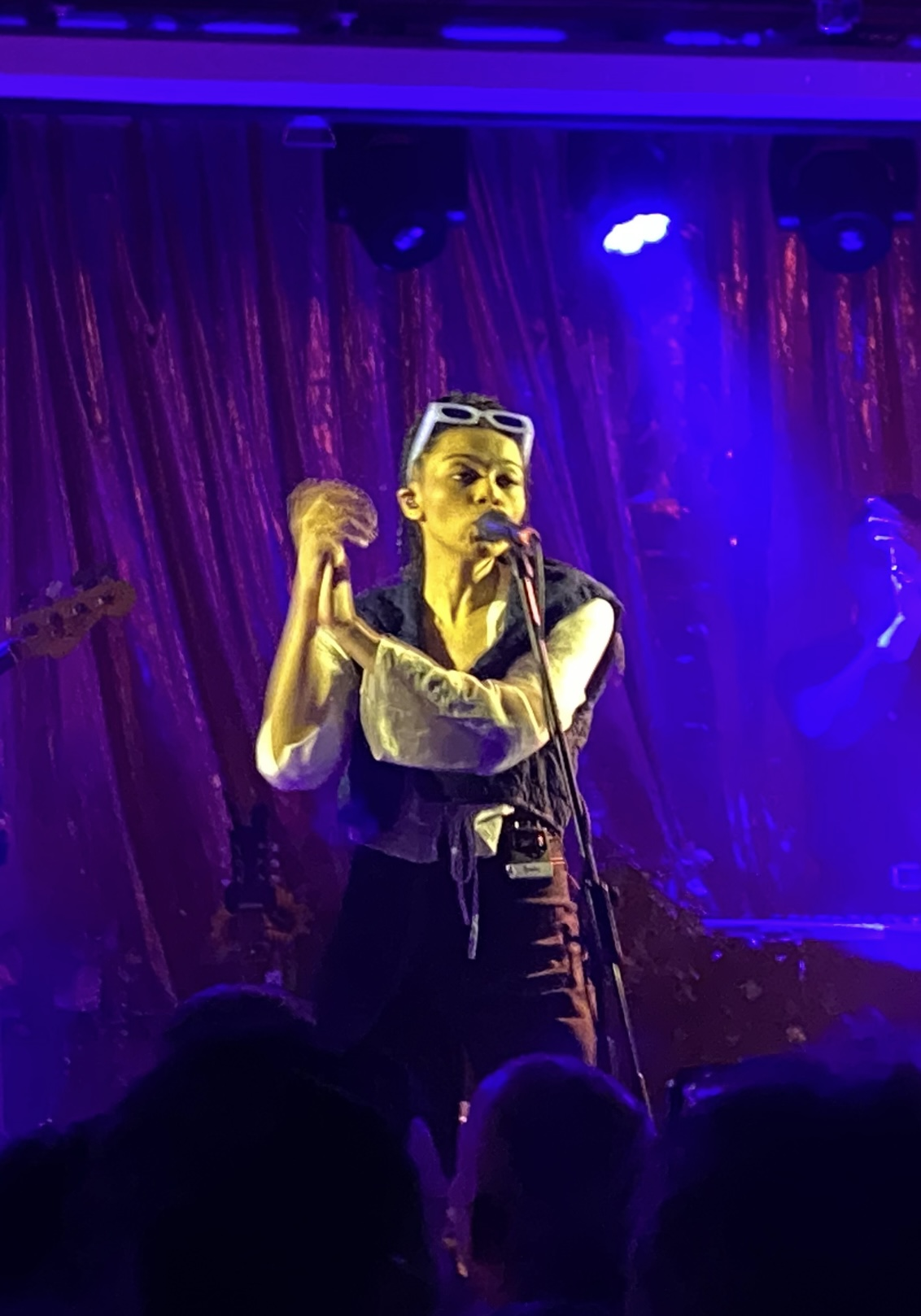
- Combe performing in Leeds, 2025

Background information
- Born: October 29, 1999 (age 26)
- Origin: Dalkeith, Midlothian, Scotland
- Genre: Soul
- Occupations: Singer; songwriter; multi-instrumentalist
- Years active: 2021-present
- Labels: Modern Sky UK; Island Records
- Website: brookecombe.os.fan

Brooke Combe is a Scottish singer, songwriter and multi-instrumentalist, best known for her 2025 breakthrough album Dancing at the Edge of the World.

== Career ==
=== Early life ===
Combe grew up in Dalkeith, a small town near Edinburgh, Scotland, playing instruments from a young age. Raised on her grandparents' collection of classic Motown albums, as well as the '90s neo-soul and R&B loved by her parents, she began to branch out to rock music at 17 and was encouraged by her school music teacher to develop her vocals and to study music at university. Combe began to release covers of her favourite songs online, which quickly grew her audience.

=== 2021-2024: Island Records ===
Combe first came to national prominence with her 2021 debut single, "Are You With Me?", a "glossy", singalong track with a "hand-clapping chorus". She would later sign to major-label Island Records, appeared at the Glastonbury Festival in 2022, and released 2023 mixtape Black is the New Gold, which "explored oppression and ideas of typical femininity through the lens of a tender homage to her Black roots." Combe later began writing her debut album, but became disillusioned when faced by the commercial constraints and expectations of a major label. She dropped out of her contract and began working with producer and frontman of the Coral, James Skelly.

=== 2025-present: Dancing at the Edge of the World ===
In 2025, after her stint on Island Records, Combe independently released Northern soul-influenced debut album Dancing at the Edge of the World to acclaim. In a review for music publication Clash, writer Robin Murray praised the project as an "absolute stormer – vintage styled soul that feels totally refreshing... Combe isn't satisfied with retreading old ground, instead finding her own unique place within an R&B lineage." The Line of Best Fit heralded the album as "a massive step forward". On September 15, Combe was announced to be the opening act for the second half of American singer Benson Boone's American Heart World Tour.

== Discography ==
=== Studio albums ===
- Dancing at the Edge of the World (2025)

=== Extended plays ===
- Black Is the New Gold (2023)

=== Guest appearances ===
Title	Year	Artist	Album
"Sweet Surrender"	2024	Courteeners	Pink Cactus Café

== Awards and nominations ==
Year	Ceremony	Award	Result	Ref
2021	Scottish Music Awards	Best Female Breakthrough	Won	
2022	Scottish Alternative Music Awards	Best Rock/Alternative	Nominated	
2024	Rolling Stone UK Awards	PlayNext Award	Won	

== Tours ==
=== Opening ===
- American Heart World Tour (2025) - Benson Boone
