= Neighbourhood Weekender =

Music Festival in Warrington

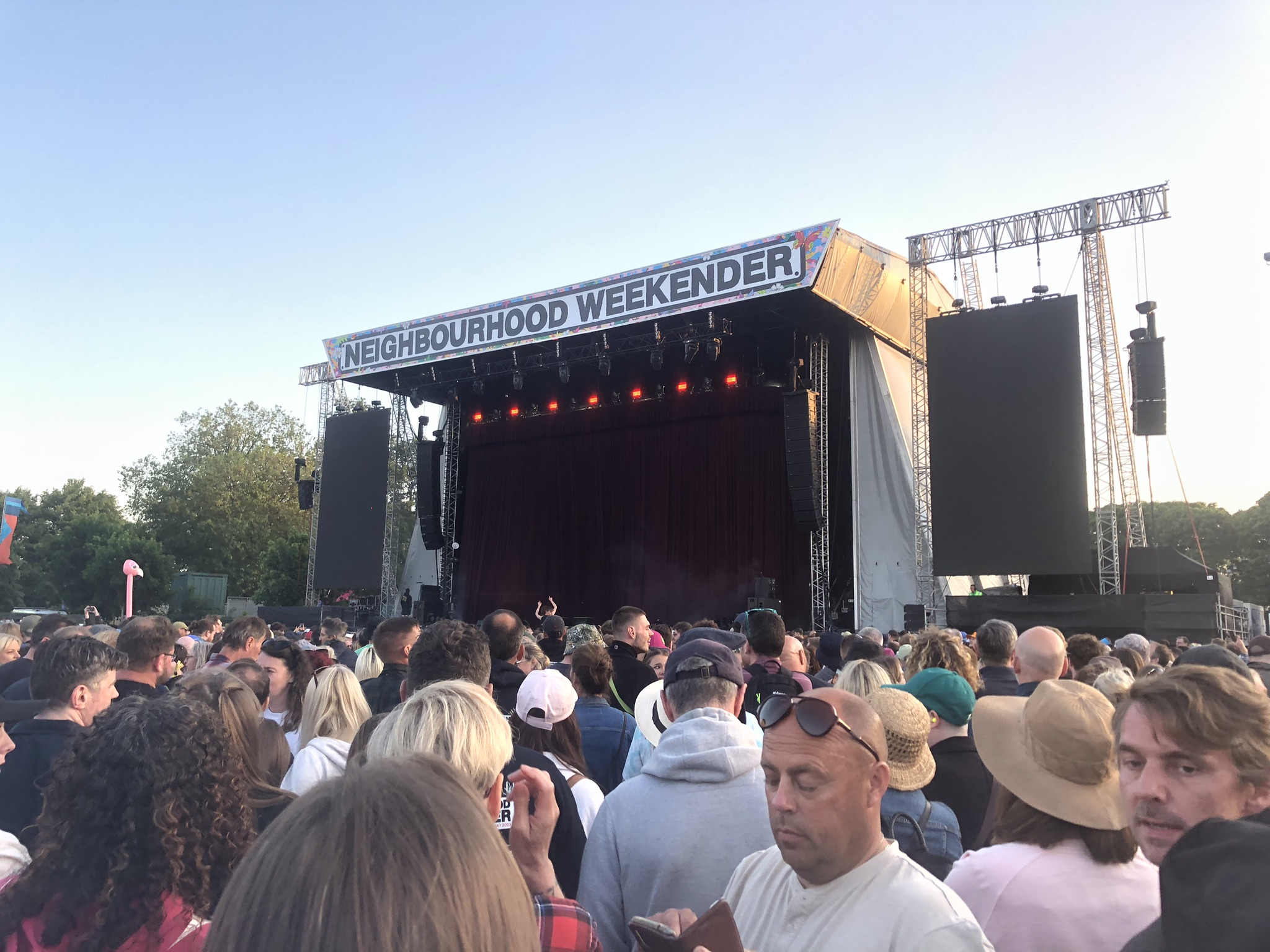
- The Main Stage, 2023
- Frequency: Annually
- Locations: Warrington, England
- Years active: 2018–present (Except 2020 & 2024)
- Attendance: 26,000 (2022)
- Website: nbhdweekender.com

Neighbourhood Weekender (often shortened to NBHD Weekender) is a two-day music festival held annually at Victoria Park in Warrington, England on May bank holiday weekend.

The festival was created in 2018 as a companion to the multi-venue festival 'Neighbourhood Festival' in Manchester, and featured Courteeners and Noel Gallagher's High Flying Birds headlining.

== Lineups ==
=== 2018 ===
Neighbourhood Weekender 2018 took place on Saturday 26 May and Sunday 27 May. It was the first ever iteration of the festival.

| Saturday 26 May | Sunday 27 May |
| Courteeners; Jake Bugg; Kodaline; Circa Waves; Miles Kane; Starsailor | Noel Gallagher's High Flying Birds; Blossoms; Editors; The Coral; The Sherlocks; DMA's |

=== 2019 ===
Neighbourhood Weekender 2019 took place on Saturday 25 May and Sunday 26 May.

| Saturday 25 May | Sunday 26 May |
| George Ezra; Primal Scream; You Me At Six; Nothing But Thieves; Tom Grennan; The Hunna; Maxïmo Park; Pale Waves | Richard Ashcroft; The Vaccines; Slaves; The Charlatans; Gerry Cinnamon; White Lies; The Amazons; Sam Fender |

=== 2020 ===
The 2020 edition was due to take place on Saturday 23 & Sunday 24 May 2020, but was postponed due to the COVID-19 pandemic.

=== 2021 ===
Neighbourhood Weekender 2021 took place from Friday 3 September to Sunday 5 September. It was originally due to take place from Friday 28 May to Sunday 30 May, but was postponed due to the ongoing COVID-19 pandemic, with James replacing Ian Brown. It is currently the only iteration of the festival to feature a Friday entry.

| Friday 3 September | Saturday 4 September | Sunday 5 September |
| Gerry Cinnamon; Circa Waves; Milburn; Jade Bird; Orla Gartland | James (replacing Ian Brown); Sam Fender; Shed Seven; Pale Waves; Easy Life; The Coral; Reverend and the Makers | Catfish and the Bottlemen; The Wombats; Paul Heaton & Jacqui Abbott; Miles Kane; Sundara Karma; Tom Walker; The Lightning Seeds |

=== 2022 ===
Neighbourhood Weekender 2022 took place on Saturday 28 May and Sunday 29 May.

| Saturday 28 May | Sunday 29 May |
| Courteeners; DMA's; Becky Hill; The Lathums; James Bay; The Snuts; The Fratellis | Kasabian; Blossoms; Tom Grennan; Manic Street Preachers; Pale Waves; Razorlight; Inhaler |

=== 2023 ===
Neighbourhood Weekender 2023 took place on Saturday 27 May and Sunday 28 May.

| Saturday 27 May | Sunday 28 May |
| Paul Heaton; The Kooks; The Wombats; Ocean Colour Scene; Jamie Webster; Sugababes | Pulp; Self Esteem; Anne-Marie; Sea Girls; Confidence Man; Gang of Youths |

=== 2024 ===
On 15 November 2023, it was announced that Neighbourhood Weekender would be taking a break in 2024, but would return in 2025.

=== 2025 ===
Neighbourhood Weekender 2025 took place on Saturday 24 May and Sunday 25 May.

| Saturday 24 May | Sunday 25 May |
| James; The Wombats; The Reytons; Ocean Colour Scene; The Snuts; Amy Macdonald | Stereophonics; The Lathums; Inhaler; Dizzee Rascal; Sigrid; CMAT |

=== 2026 ===
Neighbourhood Weekender 2026 took place on Saturday 23 May and Sunday 24 May.

| Saturday 23 May | Sunday 24 May |
| Richard Ashcroft; Kaiser Chiefs; The K's; Example; Sophie Ellis-Bextor; Cast | Blossoms; DMA's; Jamie Webster; Shed Seven; Razorlight; The Royston Club |

=== 2027 ===
Neighbourhood Weekender 2027 is set to take place on Saturday 29 May and Sunday 30 May.

| Saturday 29 May | Sunday 30 May |
| Paul Heaton; The Reytons; Kingfishr; The Vaccines; The Fratellis; Gabrielle | Courteeners; The Royston Club; Rick Astley; The Coral; The View; Professor Green |
