= Take Over the World =

Single by The Courteeners

from the album Falcon
- Released: 25 April 2010 (Digital); 26 April 2010 (Physical)
- Recorded: 2009
- Genre: Indie rock
- Length: 3:21
- Label: Polydor
- Songwriter: Liam Fray
- Producers: Ed Buller, Tom Knott

The Courteeners singles chronology
"You Overdid It Doll" (2010)	"Take Over the World" (2010)	"Lose Control" (2012)

"Take Over the World" is the second single to be released from The Courteeners second album Falcon. It was released as a Digital Download on 25 April 2010, and the CD single was released the following day. The song features in the Visa 2012 Olympics advertising.

== Chart performance ==
A lack of radio airplay meant that "Take Over the World" was The Courteeners' second least successful single, after Cavorting peaked at #192 in 2007. The single debuted on the UK Singles Chart on 2 May 2010 at a current peak of #114.

Chart (2010)	Peak Position
UK Singles Chart	114

== Track listing ==
CD
1."Take Over The World"
2."Piercing Blues"

7" (1)
1."Take Over The World"
2."There is a Light That Never Goes Out (feat. Miles Kane) [Live from XFM Winter Wonderland]

7" (2)
1."Take Over The World (Demo)
2."Why Do You Do It? (Le Mouv Session)"

EP
1."Take Over The World (Demo)
2."Piercing Blues"
3."There is a Light That Never Goes Out (feat. Miles Kane) [Live from XFM Winter Wonderland]"
4."Why Do You Do It? (Le Mouv session)"

== Credits ==
- Engineer – Lee Slater (tracks: 1)
- Mixed By – Jeremy Wheatley (tracks: 1)
- Producer – Ed Buller (tracks: 1), Tom Knott (tracks: 2)
- Written By – Liam Fray
