= You Overdid It Doll =

Single by The Courteeners

from the album Falcon
- Released: 15 February 2010
- Recorded: 2009
- Genre: Indie rock
- Label: Polydor
- Songwriter(s): Liam Fray
- Producer(s): Ed Buller

The Courteeners singles chronology
"That Kiss" (2008)	"You Overdid It Doll" (2010)	"Take Over The World" (2010)

"You Overdid It Doll" is the first single from The Courteeners' second album, Falcon. It was released on 15 February 2010 as both a digital download, CD single and 7" single. As of 21 February 2010, the single has peaked at #28 on the UK Singles Chart, making it The Courteeners's fifth UK Top 40 single. As of 2021, it remains their last UK Top 40 hit.

== Chart performance ==
"You Overdid It Doll" was released on 15 February 2010 as a CD single and 7" single. On 21 February 2010, the single entered the UK Singles Chart for the first time, managing to reach a current peak of #28. "You Overdid It Doll" is now The Courteeners's third single to enter the Top 30.

Chart (2010)	Peak Position
Scotland (OCC)	24
UK Singles (OCC)	28

== Track listing ==
- CD
1. "You Overdid It Doll"
2. "I Never Wanted To"
- 7" (1)
1. "You Overdid It Doll"
2. "Whites of Her Eyes"
- 7" (2)
1. "You Overdid It Doll (Live from Manchester Central 11/12/09)"
2. "Social Fireworks"
- EP
1. "You Overdid It Doll" (Live from Manchester Central)
2. "I Never Wanted To"
3. "Whites of Her Eyes"
4. "Social Fireworks"
