= Concrete Love =

Studio album by Courteeners
- Released: 18 August 2014
- Genres: Indie rock; synth-pop; post-punk
- Length: 46:15
- Label: Cooperative Music
- Producer: Joseph Cross

Courteeners chronology
Anna (2013)	Concrete Love (2014)	Mapping the Rendezvous (2016)

Singles from Anna
- 1. "Summer" Released: 20 June 2014; 2. "How Good It Was" Released: 1 September 2014

Concrete Love is the fourth studio album by British rock band Courteeners, released on 18 August 2014 via Cooperative Music label. It features the band delve further into a post-punk sound and was inspired by 1980s music. Promoted by two singles, Concrete Love received generally favourable reviews from music critics and reached number three on the UK Albums Chart.

== Background ==
Courteeners released their third studio album Anna in February 2013. It peaked at number six in the UK Albums Chart; out of its three singles, "Lose Control" was the only one to chart, reaching number 82 in the United Kingdom. The band promoted the album with two tours of the UK – one at the start of the year and the other at the end – and special performances at Castlefield Bowl. Frontman Liam Fray and Joe Cross, who had produced Anna, went to Montmartre, Paris to work on demos for the band's next album. Cross took his laptop and a few instruments to help them; the pair eventually came up with an album's worth of songs. Following the second UK tour, the band went on hiatus; it did not last long as Fray explained: "the good songs just kept coming and people still seemed quite hungry for us, so we carried on". Following this, Fray and Cross went to Whitby to do further work on the demos.

== Composition and lyrics ==
Concrete Love is an indie rock and synth-pop album that expands on the sound of Anna, drawing from 1980s music. AllMusic reviewer Matt Collar said the band "delve even deeper into a layered post-punk sound that finds them adding more guitars and even strings on some cuts". Fray described the material as "stories, they come from somewhere. They're a little bit less literal, a bit more abstract [...] I've always been a fan of that kind of kitchen sink style of writing. [...] There are little pockets of abstract dotted around. So there's a bit more, 'Let people make their mind up', I guess, than the last record".

"White Horses" features country-leaning acoustic guitars, backed by industrial beats. On "How Good It Was", Fray explained that "it almost felt like a kind of Beach Boy Motown, as a kind of homage to Danny Zuko and it happened". It is an indie pop song dealing with love during one's childhood years. "Small Bones" describes long-distance relationships; the horns heard in evoke the work of Arcade Fire. "Has He Told You That He Loves You Yet" is a pseudo-psychedelic track, sung from the perspective of a father to their teenage offspring. "Black & Blue" has a punk rock rhythm echoing the sound of their first two studio albums, St. Jude (2008) and Flacon (2010), with Fray's vocals recalling Liam Gallagher of Beady Eye.

With "International", Fray mentioned how he spent more time working on it than any other song on the album: "I just felt very bare and very exposed and I didn’t like it at all. It was difficult". The simplistic lyrics of "Next Time You Call" earned it a comparison to Reverend and the Makers. "Summer" is a 1960s sunshine pop song, while "Saboteur" includes a synthesizer-led breakdown. "Saboteur" has robotic-sounding vocals and a psychedelic atmosphere. Fray said "Dreamers" deals with people that are viewed as outsiders from British football: "I’m not just saying it’s a class issue, it’s a taste and a fashion issue too". The closing track, "Beautiful Heads", features a chord progression akin to a Church service. Fray felt "Winter Wonderland" was "custom built for live shows"; he wrote it on a piano at Norah Jones' New York City home, and had previously performed in 2011.

== Release ==
On 20 June 2014, Concrete Love was announced for released in two months' time; the album's track listing and artwork was posted online. Alongside this, "Summer" was made available for streaming. The band held a one-off show at the 100 Club in London, where they debuted five new songs from the forthcoming album. The How Good It Was EP was released on 21 July 2014, containing the outtakes "Hometown One", "Sunflower" and "Why Are You Still With Him?". The music video for "How Good It Was" was posted on YouTube on 6 August 2014. They supported the Killers for a one-off show in Glasgow and appeared at the Reading and Leeds Festivals. Concrete Love was released on 18 August 2014; a deluxe edition included a DVD of footage filmed during their 2013 Castlefield Bowl performances. "How Good It Was" was released as the album's lead single on 1 September 2014. Courteeners embarked on a tour of the UK, which ran into November 2015, ending with a performance at the Liverpool Arena. The London date was stopped abruptly when a fan lit a flare inside the venue; the band were told by various venues and authorities to stop any performances should someone set off a flare. "Next Time You Call" was released as the album's second single on 10 November 2014.

Courteeners performed at Heaton Park in Manchester in June 2015, marking the first time that a band in three years All 25,000 tickets sold out in 40 minutes; they were supported by Peace, Bipolar Sunshine and Blossoms. Following this, Courteeners appeared at the Isle of Wight, Glastonbury, T in the Park and V Festivals. The music video for "Small Bones" was posted on YouTube on 1 November 2015. The band closed out the year with a UK tour, which ended with five consecutive shows O2 Apollo in Manchester, with support from Declan McKenna and Pretty Vicious. "Winter Wonderland" was released as a single on 17 November 2015; the seven-inch vinyl record featured an acoustic version of "Small Bones" as its B-side. Ten days later, Concrete Love was reissued under the name Concrete Love – Extra Love, which consisted of the original album, the How Good It Was EP, "Winter Wonderland", a phone recording of "Next Time You Call" and acoustic versions of "Summer", "How Good It Was", "International" and "Small Bones". The music video for "Winter Wonderland" was posted on YouTube on 21 December 2015. Around this time, bassist Mark Cupello left the band and was replaced by Cross.

== Reception ==
Professional ratings
Aggregate scores
Source	Rating
AnyDecentMusic?	5.6/10
Metacritic	61/100
Review scores
Source	Rating
AllMusic	3.5/5 stars
Gigslutz	3/5 stars
Hot Press	3.5/5
The Irish Times	3/5 stars
The Line of Best Fit	5/10
NME	2.5/5 stars

Concrete Love was met with generally favourable reviews from music critics. At Metacritic, the album received an average score of 61, based on five reviews. AnyDecentMusic? gave it an average score of 5.6, based on six reviews.

Renowned for Sound contributor Andrew Le said aside from a "few shortcomings, the Courteeners’ new album proves why the band has performed well as a live act, as its guitar riffs and choruses should incite sing-alongs at its concerts". The Irish Times writer Lauren Murphy felt the band "fails to offer anything beyond their anthemic indie-rock [...] it’s not quite enough to make these perfectly passable songs remarkable in any way". Sam Willis of The Line of Best Fit ponder if "there['s] anything new here? Absolutely not", explaining that the band had not evolved since their previous work. Gigslutz writer Beth Kirkbride said it felt "very much like it wasn’t left to cook for long enough [...] I’m still hungry after eating it". NME's Barry Nicolson felt that the album's biggest drawback was its "lack of inspiration, perhaps a result of the speedy turnaround between this record and its predecessor".

Concrete Love debuted at number three in the UK Albums Chart, eventually being certified gold by the British Phonographic Industry (BPI) in 2018. It also reached number four in Scotland. "How Good It Was" charted at number 42 in Scotland and number 66 in the UK. "Summer" peaked at number 98 in Scotland and number 104 in the UK. The track was certified silver by the BPI in 2023.

== Track listing ==
All tracks are written by Liam Fray.

No.	Title	Length
1.	"White Horses"	3:58
2.	"How Good It Was"	4:05
3.	"Small Bones"	4:13
4.	"Has He Told You That He Loves You Yet"	4:11
5.	"Black & Blue"	3:51
6.	"International"	4:43
7.	"Next Time You Call"	3:32
8.	"Summer"	3:35
9.	"Saboteur"	3:35
10.	"Dreamers"	5:14
11.	"Beautiful Head"	5:18
Total length:		46:15

== Credits ==
Courteeners

- Liam Fray – vocals, guitars,
- Daniel Moores – guitars
- Mark Cuppello – bass guitars
- Michael Campbell – drums
- Adam Payne – Keyboards
- Continuous

== Charts and certifications ==
=== Weekly charts ===
Chart performance for Concrete Love
Chart (2014)	Peak position
Scottish Albums (Official Charts)	4
UK Albums (Official Charts)	3

=== Certifications ===
Certifications for Concrete Love
Region	Certification	Certified units/sales
United Kingdom (BPI)	Gold	100,000^{‡}
^{‡} Sales+streaming figures based on certification alone.
