= What Took You So Long? (The Courteeners song) =

Single by The Courteeners

from the album St. Jude
- Released: 14 January 2008
- Recorded: 2007
- Genre: Indie rock
- Label: Polydor
- Songwriter(s): Liam Fray
- Producer(s): Stephen Street

The Courteeners singles chronology
"Acrylic" (2007)	"What Took You So Long?" (2008)	"Not Nineteen Forever" (2008)

"What Took You So Long?" is the third single released by indie rock band The Courteeners, available on their debut studio album St. Jude. It was released on 14 January 2008 on a CD single and 7-inch vinyl, reaching #20 in the UK Singles Chart. This song was the Courteeners first single in the top 40.

== Lyrical meaning ==
The song is a lyrical attack on bedroom exiles of the modern day with no experience of the real world and living their lives through internet fora and social networking sites, boasting that their musical taste is superior to that of people with real lives and real social tendencies due to liking a more obscure band. As Fray and Campbell put it in a 2008 interview for Channel 4:

What Took You So Long? is a song about kids who are glued to their computers:- "Oh, yeah, I've heard of this band, right, they're from Canada, they released one song, but it was only on, like, this cassette, that's now illegal in this country, so you can't get 'em-" [Campbell] "…It was eight seconds long…" [Fray] "…But it was brilliant, and we know more about music 'cos we…" …and you know what, get a grip! Go out, and go to gigs, and play guitars instead of at a keyboard and dribbling over a screen. Which is what happens these days. Go and play the fuck out!

The song also features the lyric "Do you know who I am? I'm like a Morrissey with some strings", which did little to disassociate the band with their Manchester roots, but shifted the focus from traditional Manchester "lad-rock" contingents such as Oasis and the Happy Mondays, to the more intellectual and sensitive Smiths.

== Chart performance ==
The single was released on 18 January 2008 as a CD single and was also made available as a 7 inch vinyl. The single entered the UK Singles Chart at a peak of #20, beating the bands prior singles.

Chart (2008)	Peak Position
UK Singles (OCC)	20

== Uses of the song ==
The song was used for a series of television advertisements circa-Winter 2008 for the UK DCSF (Department for Children, Schools and Families) 'Science and Maths' campaign aimed at high school students aged between 11 and 16 years old to showcase the interesting and exciting jobs taking Science and Maths in school, can lead young people to.

== Track listing ==
- CD
1. "What Took You So Long?"
2. "Slowdown"
- 7"
1. "What Took You So Long?"
2. "Not One Could I Give"
