= No You Didn't, No You Don't =

Single by The Courteeners

from the album St. Jude
- Released: 23 June 2008
- Recorded: 2007
- Genre: Indie rock
- Length: 3:58
- Label: Polydor
- Songwriter(s): Liam Fray
- Producer(s): Stephen Street

The Courteeners singles chronology
"Not Nineteen Forever" (2008)	"No You Didn't, No You Don't" (2008)	"That Kiss" (2008)

"No You Didn't, No You Don't" is the fifth single released by indie rock band The Courteeners, it is from their debut studio album St. Jude. It was released on 23 June 2008 on a CD single and two 7 inch singles reaching #35 in the UK Singles Chart.

== Lyrical meaning ==
The lyrics supposedly describe a previous girlfriend claiming that she broke (presumably) Fray's heart and that she knows him better than any other, and seems to look down on him for his ambitions in relation to music, while Fray counters this with the argument that he's a lot more sophisticated and intelligent than he is given credit for and will one day have more success than predicted.

== Chart performance ==
The single was released on 23 June 2008 and managed to enter the UK Singles Chart at a peak of #35, making it The Courteeners' third UK Top 40 entry.

Chart (2008)	Peak Position
UK Singles (OCC)	35

== Track listing ==
- CD
1. "No You Didn't, No You Don't"
2. "I'm Sticking With You" (Velvet Underground cover)
3. "About You Now" (live Sugababes cover)
4. "Dream a Little Dream of Me" (The Mamas & the Papas cover)
- 7" (1)
1. "No You Didn't, No You Don't"
2. "New Romantic" (Laura Marling cover)
- 7" (2)
1. "No You Didn't, No You Don't"
2. "Out to Get You" (James cover)
