= That Kiss =

Single by The Courteeners
- Released: 6 October 2008
- Recorded: 2008
- Genre: Indie rock
- Label: Polydor
- Songwriter(s): Liam Fray
- Producer(s): Stephen Street

The Courteeners singles chronology
"No You Didn't, No You Don't" (2008)	"That Kiss" (2008)	"You Overdid It Doll" (2010)

"That Kiss" is the sixth single released by indie rock band The Courteeners, it is a non-album track. It was released on 6 October 2008 on a CD and two 7" singles reaching number 36 on the UK Singles Chart.

== Track listing ==
- CD
1. "That Kiss"
2. "Jacket"
- 7" (1)
1. "That Kiss"
2. "Saw This and FORT of You"
- 7" (2)
1. "That Kiss"
2. "Car 31"

== Chart performance ==
"That Kiss" was released on 6 October as a CD single along with two alternate 7"s. Despite not being an album release, the single managed to enter the UK Singles Chart at a peak of number 36, making it the band's fourth UK Top 40 entry.

Chart (2008)	Peak position
UK Singles (OCC)	36
