= More. Again. Forever. =

Studio album by Courteeners
- Released: 17 January 2020
- Recorded: 2019
- Genres: Pop; psychedelic
- Length: 39:24
- Label: Ignition

Courteeners chronology
Mapping the Rendezvous (2016)	More. Again. Forever. (2020)	Pink Cactus Café (2024)

Singles from More. Again. Forever.
- 1. "Heavy Jacket" Released: 2 September 2019; 2. "Better Man" Released: 2 December 2019; 3. "Hanging Off Your Cloud" Released: 13 January 2020

More. Again. Forever. is the sixth studio album by British rock band Courteeners. Following their fifth studio album Mapping the Rendezvous (2016), the band released a reimagined version of their debut studio album St. Jude (2008) and scrapped an album's worth of new material. After a co-writing session with Rich Turvey and a tour of the United Kingdom, frontman Liam Fray wrote the majority of what would appear on their next album in early 2019. Recording for it concluded by April 2019; More. Again. Forever. is a pop and psychedelic album that takes influence from the work of LCD Soundsystem, as well as a period of addiction and self-improvement that Fray went through.

More. Again. Forever. received generally favourable from critics, with many praising the songwriting. The album reached number two in the UK and number one in Scotland, while "Hanging Off Your Cloud" reached the top 30 of the UK Independent Singles Chart. "Heavy Jacket" was released as its lead single in September 2019, followed by "Better Man" in December 2019, which coincided with two one-off shows in London and Manchester. "Hanging Off Your Cloud" was released as the album's third single in January 2020; shortly afterwards, Courteeners went on a short UK tour. They performed at the Emirates Old Trafford in Manchester to a crowd of 50,000 in September 2021, which led into a UK tour at the end of the year.

== Background and writing ==
Courteeners released their fifth studio album Mapping the Rendezvous in October 2016, peaking at number four in the UK Albums Chart. It was promoted with a tour of the United Kingdom, a one-off performance at Emirates Old Trafford in Manchester to a crowd of 50,000, and frontman Liam Fray embarking on a solo tour. They released a reimagined version of their debut studio album St. Jude (2008), under the name St. Jude Re:Wired, in early 2018. By August 2018, the band were in the process of writing material; Fray revealed he had scrapped an album's worth of songs as he was unsatisfied with the output.

Fray was hesitant about working with an outside writer, before he was put in contact with Blossoms and She Drew the Gun producer Rich Turvey, who Fray had met through James Skelly of the Coral. Fray and Turvey subsequently wrote four songs across six days. In November and December 2018, Courteeners embarked on a tour of the UK, with support from Gerry Cinnamon and Zuzu; during this, they debuted "Better Man", "Heavy Jacket" and "Hanging Off Your Cloud". A majority of the songs that would end up on the forthcoming album were written within the first seven weeks of 2019, when Fray was abstaining from alcohol. In April 2019, Fray announced that they had finished recording their next album.

== Composition and lyrics ==
More. Again. Forever. is a pop and psychedelic album. The title was influenced by Leslie Jamison's book on sobriety, The Recovering: Intoxication and its Aftermath (2018), which Fray had found while in Oregon. Stewart Mason of AllMusic, the album had a "distinctly dance-friendly sound" inspired by the work of LCD Soundsystem, "focus[ing] on bass grooves and insightful lyrics that marked a late-era maturation for the crew". Fray said it was influenced by "excess, addiction and self-improvement"; for sometime he was unable to "get myself or my head together" and struggled to write anything.

When asked if the album was a "map of your road to recovery", Fray responded that it "wasn’t meant to be that way. I think I’m just too lazy to write about anything else than what’s going on in my head or in my heart". Clash writer Susan Hansen said the "complexity of what it means to be human in this day and age is placed under the microscope" with the album. Fray wrote nearly all of the songs, except for "Better Man", "Hanging Off Your Cloud", "One Day at a Time" and "Is Heaven Even Worth It?"; Fray co-wrote "Hanging Off Your Cloud" with Ola Modupe-Ojo, while the other three were written with Turvey.

The electro-glam "Heart Attack" opens More. Again. Forever., akin to David Bowie fronting Kasabian. "Heavy Jacket" opens with a drum beat and piano part that recalls "9 to 5" (1980) by Dolly Parton, eventually shifting to dance-rock. It comes across as a mix of the Charlatans and Royal Blood; the song includes a reference to actress Caroline Aherne. "More. Again. Forever." echoes the work of Chic, and sees Fray doing spoken-word over a bass-centric backing track. "Better Man" is an indie pop track about one's flaws and looking for self-improvement, while evoking "Losing My Religion" (1991) by R.E.M. The combination of minimalist piano and a string section in "Hanging Off Your Cloud" is reminiscent of the intro section of "Runaway" (2010) by Kanye West.

Discussing the house-lite "Previous Parties", the band viewed their albums from a vinyl perspective, as Fray explained: "Track five is always a slow song to end the first side, then track six [to open the second side] has to be a really big punch again". "The Joy of Missing Out" is a post-punk revival track, anchored by a bass part in the style of Joy Division, that conveys the opposite approach to the "fear of missing out" mentality. "One Day at a Time", as well as "Is Heaven Even Worth It?", is a ballad in the vein of the Lilac Time frontman Stephen Duffy. In a review for The Guardian, journalist Alexis Petridis said "Take It on the Chin" has Fray seeing a therapist "in embarrassment, haunted by the thought that this really isn’t the way that men, particularly northern men, are supposed to behave". The album closes with "Is Heaven Even Worth It?", which sees Fray tackle self-deprecation, viewing people's lives on Instagram, and coming across as desolate despite having anything he wanted.

== Release ==
In May 2019, Courteeners played a benefit show for a homeless charity. In June 2019, the band played two warm up shows with the Coral and Inhaler, leading to an appearance at the Isle of Wight Festival. The day after the latter, they performed at Heaton Park in Manchester in front of a crowd of 50,000, with support from James, DMA's and Pale Waves. Following this, Courteeners appeared at Glastonbury, Tramlines and Kendal Calling festivals. On 2 September 2019, More. Again. Forever. was announced for release in four months' time; alongside this, the album's artwork and track listing was posted online. "Heavy Jacket" was released as its lead single and a lyric video was posted online. The following month, the band released a music video for "Heavy Jacket", the first part of a trilogy that comprised the short film Better. The video features Sarah Beck Mather and Maisy Jones, and sees Fray singing in a nightclub; it was directed by Joe Connor. Better was based on a short story of the same name by Emma Jane Unsworth, who Fray was a big fan of.

"More. Again. Forever." was made available for streaming on 30 October 2019. The band closed out the year with two one-off shows: Olympia in London on 30 November 2019; and Manchester Arena on 14 December 2019, both with orchestras. They were supported by the Coral at London and Miles Kane at Manchester; Courteeners were joined by touring member Elina Lin for the shows. Between these two gigs, "Better Man" was released as single on 2 December 2019. Two days later, the music video for the song was posted online; it was also directed by Connor. Later in the month, "Better Man" was bundled with acoustic versions of "Better Man" and "Heavy Jacket" as extra tracks. "Hanging Off Your Cloud" was released as single on 13 January 2020. More. Again. Forever. was released four days later; it was promoted with six intimate shows across the UK. The music video for "Hanging Off Your Cloud" was posted online on 29 January 2020; it stars a woman having an out-of-body experience while being operated on, and was also directed by Connor.

Courteeners were due to support Kings of Leon for a one-off show and appear at the TRNSMT and Reading and Leeds Festivals; all were cancelled due to the COVID-19 pandemic. In April and May 2020, Fray held a series of shows from his home through Instagram as the pandemic continued. In September 2021, Courteeners appeared at TRNSMT and played two one-off shows: a warm-up show at Scarborough Open Air Theatre with the Coral, leading to a performance at the Emirates Old Trafford with support from Johnny Marr, Blossoms, the Big Moon and Zuzu. The Old Trafford show, which consisted of a crowd of 50,000, sold out within 90 minutes. Courteeners closed out the year with a short UK tour in November 2021, under the banner of Whites of Their Eyes, intended to be a 15-year celebration since their first show in 2006. Following the tour's conclusion, a film of the 2019 Heaton Park show was posted to YouTube.

== Reception ==
Professional ratings
Aggregate scores
Source	Rating
AnyDecentMusic?	7.5/10
Metacritic	78/100
Review scores
Source	Rating
AllMusic	4/5 stars
Clash	8/10
Classic Pop	9/10
Gigwise	8/10 stars
The Guardian	3/5 stars
The Irish News	7/10
NME	4/5 stars

More. Again. Forever. was met with generally favourable reviews from music critics. At Metacritic, the album received an average score of 78, based on six reviews. AnyDecentMusic? gave it an average score of 7.5, based on seven reviews.

AllMusic reviewer Neil Z. Yeung found the album to be "[s]licker and shinier than its rollicking predecessor", adding that it was "near perfect and not a song is wasted". Hansen felt that it showcased the band that was "only bigger, bolder, and stronger than before, and even more powerful than we remember them". Classic Pop writer John Earls said there was "no way anyone could call the 10 taut tunes found on [the album] generic"; he expanding on this by calling it the "glorious noise of a band mucking about with renewed confidence". Sophie Goodall of The Irish News wrote that the album "ultimately sounds nothing like the Courteeners", noting a variety of instruments.

Andrew Trendell of NME said the album "strikes a mature balance. It’s escapist in its sound but humane in its approach to the world. It’s experimental but familiar". Gigwise's Dominic Penna said "what is commendable is that Courteeners not only refuse to rest on their laurels with this record, but cast many of them aside altogether". Hot Press writer Stuart Clark said it was the "sound of band enjoying their conquering heroes status while still endeavouring to make their most audacious record yet". In contrast, Petridis thought the music offers a "mixed bag", adding that "[y]ou’re listening to a band attempting to push the boat out without scaring anyone off".

More. Again. Forever. peaked at number two in the UK, marking their highest position in their home country, while it topped the Scottish Albums Charts. "Hanging Off Your Cloud" charted at number 22 on the UK Independent Singles Chart.

== Track listing ==
All lyrics by Liam Fray, all music by Fray, except where noted.

More. Again. Forever. track listing
No.	Title	Music	Length
1.	"Heart Attack"		3:14
2.	"Heavy Jacket"		3:31
3.	"More. Again. Forever."		5:26
4.	"Better Man"	Fray; Rich Turvey	3:32
5.	"Hanging Off Your Cloud"	Fray; Ola Modupe-Ojo	5:34
6.	"Previous Parties"		3:45
7.	"The Joy of Missing Out"		2:39
8.	"One Day at a Time"	Fray; Turvey	3:49
9.	"Take It on the Chin"		3:56
10.	"Is Heaven Even Worth It?"	Fray; Turvey	3:58

== Personnel ==
Courteeners

- Liam Fray – vocals, guitar
- Daniel Moores – guitar
- Joe Cross – bass guitar
- Michael Campbell – drums
- Ben Colbeck - posters

== Charts ==
Chart performance for More. Again. Forever.
Chart (2020)	Peak position
Scottish Albums (Official Charts)	1
UK Albums (Official Charts)	2
