= Pink Cactus Café =

Studio album by Courteeners
- Released: 25 October 2024
- Length: 35:17
- Label: Ignition

Courteeners chronology
More. Again. Forever. (2020)	Pink Cactus Café (2024)

Singles from Pink Cactus Café
- 1. "Solitude of the Night Bus" Released: 9 July 2024; 2. "Pink Cactus Café" Released: 12 September 2024; 3. "Sweet Surrender" Released: 11 October 2024; 4. "The Beginning of the End" Released: 23 October 2024

Pink Cactus Café is the seventh studio album by British rock band Courteeners. It was released on 25 October 2024 by Ignition Records.

Pink Cactus Café received universally acclaimed reviews from critics, with many praising the songwriting. The album reached number two in the UK and Scotland. The album features collaborations by Brooke Combe, Ian and James Skelly (The Coral), Pixey, Charlie Salt (Blossoms), Ola Modupe-Ojo (Bipolar Sunshine) and Theo Hutchcraft (Hurts)

== Background ==
On 9 July 2024, Courteeners announced the release of their seventh studio album, alongside the first single "Solitude of the Night Bus".

== Critical reception ==
Professional ratings
Aggregate scores
Source	Rating
Metacritic	82/100
Review scores
Source	Rating
Clash	7/10
NME	4/5 stars

Pink Cactus Café was met with "universal acclaim" reviews from critics. At Metacritic, which assigns a weighted average rating out of 100 to reviews from mainstream publications, this release received an average score of 82, based on 4 reviews.

== Track listing ==
Pink Cactus Café track listing
No.	Title	Writer(s)	Length
1.	"Sweet Surrender" (feat. Brooke Combe)	Liam Fray; Theo Hutchcraft	3:34
2.	"Weekend Shy of a Feeling"	Fray; Hutchcraft; Andy Gannon	3:45
3.	"Pink Cactus Café"	Fray; Hutchcraft	3:25
4.	"Where Are We Now?"	Fray; Hutchcraft	3:49
5.	"The Beginning of the End" (feat. DMA's)	Fray; Matt Mason; Johnny Took	3:41
6.	"Solitude of the Night Bus"	Fray; Ola Modupe Ojo	3:18
7.	"First Name Terms" (feat. Pixey)	Fray; Richard Turvey	3:05
8.	"Lu Lu"	Fray; Gannon	3:14
9.	"Love You Any Less"	Fray; Turvey	3:25
10.	"Bitten by Unseen Teeth"	Fray; Hutchcraft	4:01

== Charts ==
Chart performance for ALBUM NAME
Chart (2022)	Peak position
Scottish Albums (OCC)	2
UK Albums (OCC)	2
UK Album Downloads (OCC)	2
UK Independent Albums (OCC)	1
UK Vinyl Albums (OCC)	1
