= Cabbage (band) =

English post-punk rock band

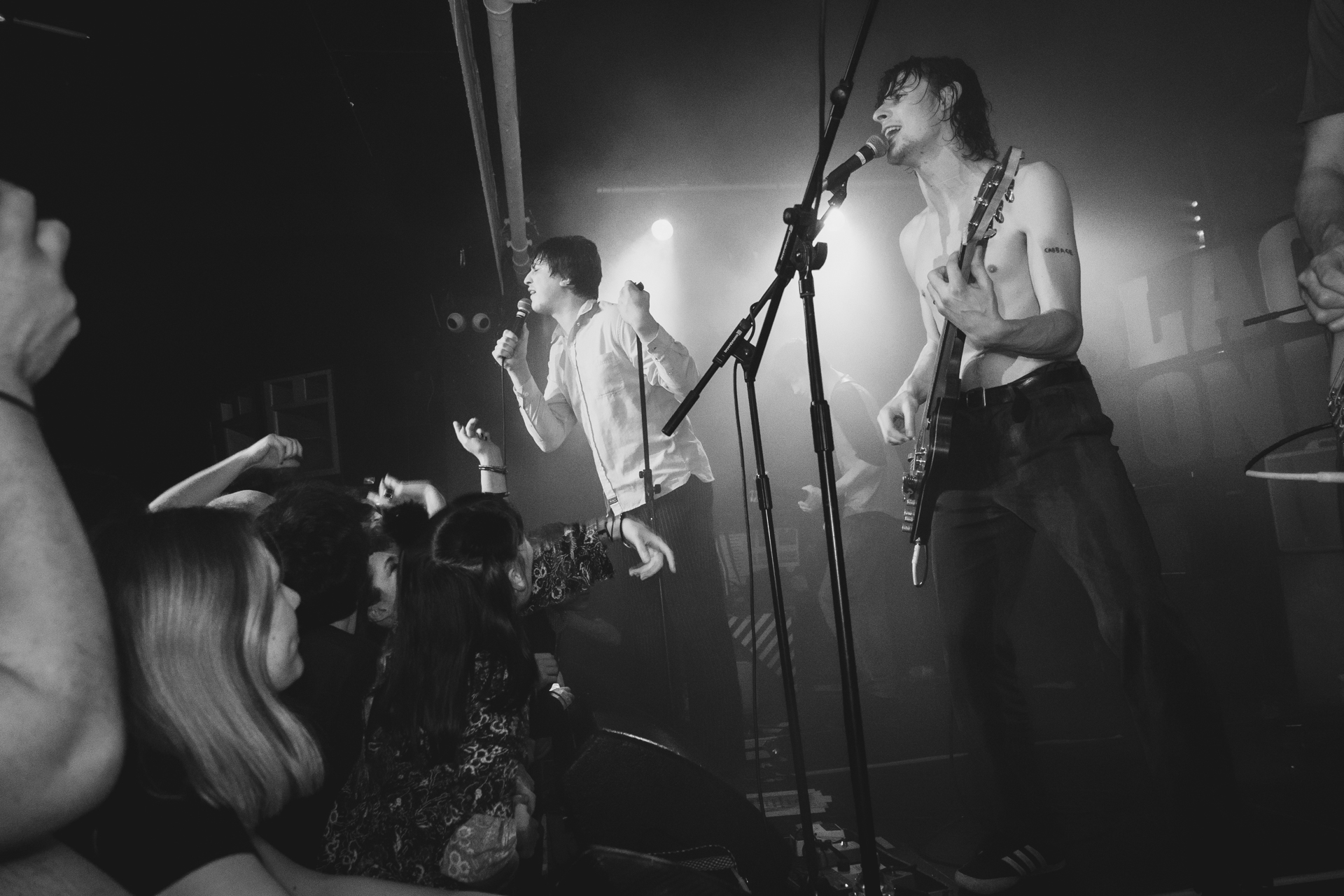

Background information
- Origin: Mossley, Tameside, England
- Genres: Alternative rock, indie rock, post-punk
- Years active: 2014-2021
- Label: Skeleton Key
- Members: Lee Broadbent; Joe Martin; Eoghan Clifford; Patrick Neville; Asa Morley
- Past members: Stephen Evans

Cabbage was an English post punk rock band, formed in 2015 in Mossley, Tameside, England. They are composed of co-frontmen Lee Broadbent and Joe Martin, guitarist Eoghan Clifford, bassist Patrick Neville and drummer Asa Morley.

== History ==
Prior to forming the band, Martin performed around Greater Manchester as a performance poet. Some poems went on to form the basis of Cabbage songs, including Dinnerlady. Broadbent was previously the drummer in Where's Strutter? and Brahma-Loka whom Bill Ryder-Jones produced tracks for at Parr Street Studios in Liverpool. Guitarist Eoghan Clifford was previously the drummer in Mossley band The Fayre, a one time member of Twisted Wheel with past Bassist Stephen Evans and also worked with local singer-songwriter Danny Mahon. Drummer Asa Morley has previously played with Storytellers. In 2019, bassist Stephen Evans departed the band and was replaced by Patrick Neville, who also performs with Mossley band 'Yellow Brain'.

The band released a collection of their early EPs, called Young, Dumb and Full of..., in January 2017.

The band released their debut album Nihilistic Glamour Shots in April 2018 which charted at No. 21 in the UK Albums Chart.

It was announced in November 2021 that they would split up at the end of their final tour.

== Band members ==
=== Current ===
- Lee Broadbent (Wilson Rabello) - Vocals
- Joe Martin - Vocals/Guitar
- Eoghan Clifford - Guitar
- Patrick Neville - Bass
- Asa Morley - Drums

=== Past ===
- Stephen Evans - Bass (2015-2019)

== Discography ==
- Young, Dumb and Full of... (6 January 2017)
- Nihilistic Glamour Shots (30 March 2018)
- Amanita Pantherina (25 September 2020)
