= The Heartbreaks =

English rock band

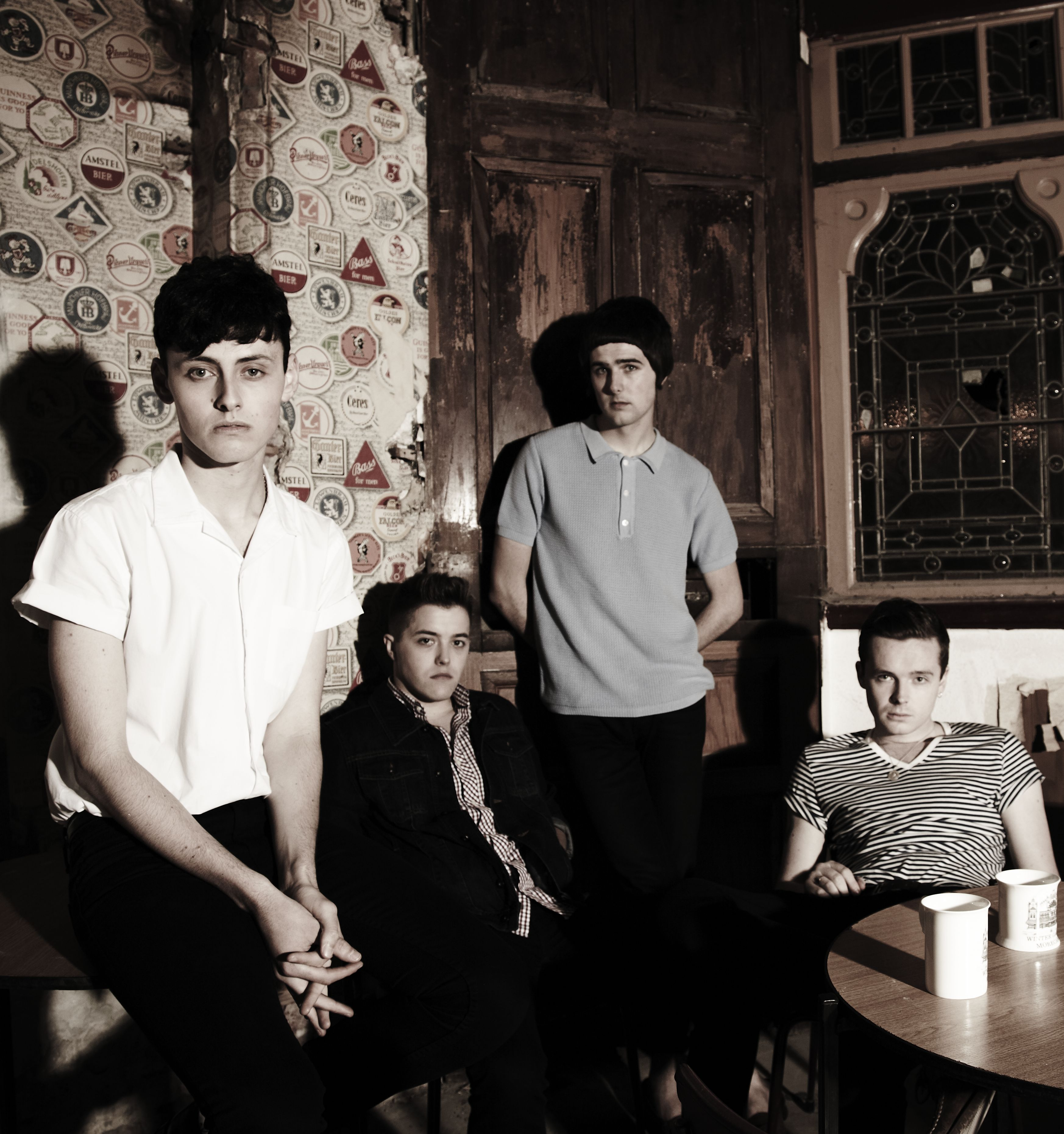

Background information
- Origin: Morecambe, England
- Genre: Indie rock
- Years active: 2009–2015
- Members: Matthew Whitehouse; Joseph Kondras; Ryan Wallace; Chris Deakin

The Heartbreaks are a British alternative rock band formed in Morecambe, Lancashire in 2009. The band consists of singer Matthew Whitehouse, songwriter and drummer Joseph Kondras, guitarist Ryan Wallace and bassist Christopher 'Deaks' Deakin.

== Career ==
=== Early career ===
The band formed in the seaside resort of Morecambe in 2009, brought together by a shared love of soul music, Orange Juice and gritty Northern literature. Before forming the band, Whitehouse and Kondras worked as ice cream men, Wallace was a roofer and Deakin "just floated from place to place". Whitehouse was the 2008–2009 North West's Under 21 Fastest Soft Serve Pourer. The competition was held in Skelmersdale, where he won £35 of WH Smith vouchers and a pair of monogrammed pouring gloves.

The band have been described as "fanatical experts on the British seaside", and many of their early rehearsals took place in an old snooker hall off the promenade,. A few months after forming, the band were named Manchester Evening News Band of 2009.

In February 2010, the band were featured on a compilation EP released by independent label Fierce Panda, called Rip It Up. Their inclusion, an early demo of song, "Jealous, Don't You Know", was given its first airplay by Steve Lamacq, who introduced it on his BBC Radio 6 Music show as "Lipstick on Your Collar meets a juggernaut of guitars which veered off the motorway somewhere in the 1980s". Lamacq would go on to describe a London Heartbreaks show around this time as "like being at the infamous Sex Pistols show at the Free Trade Hall, Manchester, June 1976".

The Heartbreaks released their debut single, Liar, My Dear, through Parlophone subsidiary Seven Sevens, in March 2010. Described as "an achingly beautiful debut" by The Independent, it was followed by a second release on Fierce Panda in August 2010, I Didn't Think It Would Hurt To Think Of You, and a tour with former Libertines frontman Carl Barat, who described them as "the finest support band I think I've ever had". A third single, Jealous Don't You Know, was released through their own imprint, Morecambe Rock, on Tri-Tone/PIASUK in March 2011, and was later remixed by English synthpop duo Hurts. These early singles earned the band comparisons to The Smiths and Manic Street Preachers in the NME, who would also describe The Heartbreaks as one of "the most exciting bands in the UK today".

Throughout 2011, The Heartbreaks supported both Morrissey and Hurts across Europe, and performed for Bono in Milan, Kitsuné in Paris and Burberry in New York, with Chief Creative Officer, Christopher Bailey declaring, "I love their energy, effortless style and very British attitude".

=== Funtimes ===
Funtimes was produced by Tristan Ivemy (Babyshambles, Frank Turner, The Holloways) with additional production from Joe Cross (Hurts, The Sound of Arrows) and the track Remorseful by Edwyn Collins and Sebastian Lewsley. It achieved notable success in Japan where lead single, Delay, Delay, spent eight weeks in the Japan Hot 100, peaking at number nine in the chart. Delay, Delay was voted Track of 2012 by readers of The Fly, beating "Pelican" by The Maccabees with 6,000 votes. The Heartbreaks followed up Funtimes by releasing Polly as a single in September 2012 as well as a re-recorded version of Hand on Heart, with strings arranged by James Banbury of The Auteurs, in February 2013.

After encountering the band in Morecambe, the co-editor of Crap Towns, Sam Jordison, wrote in The Independent about listening to Funtimes, "The music is bursting with energy, love and poison. Best of all, just about every song is about Morecambe. They have looked behind the grime and decline and found poetry. Suddenly, the town seems cool. The Heartbreaks point the way to a brighter future. It's even starting to seem like Morecambe's status as a Crap Town could be a thing of the past".

=== Post Funtimes ===
In early April 2013, Edwyn Collins revealed in an interview with the NME that he would be releasing a co-written 7" single with the band entitled What Are You Doing, Fool? for Record Store Day 2013. The b-side to the release was a cover of Orange Juice song, 'Untitled Melody'.

On 21 October, '¡No Pasarán!’, the first song to be taken from the band's then untitled second album, was made available to download for free from their official site. This was followed by two shows in London and Manchester, where tracks from the new album were performed live for the first time. The shows sold out in just a few hours.

=== We May Yet Stand A Chance ===
In early March, the band announced via Twitter that their second album would be called We May Yet Stand A Chance. Produced by Manic Street Preachers producer Dave Eringa, it is to be released in the UK on 2 June, proceeded by the singles Hey, Hey Lover and Absolved.

When asked what is new about the upcoming release, Whitehouse is quoted as saying, "Oh, many things… Cowboy psychedelia, sleazy bar-room slide, dischordal white-noise wig-outs… It all feels like a natural transition though. Rather than a deliberate ‘change of direction’. Ultimately, we’ve committed to ideas more. Ideas were always inside us but that took seclusion from an increasingly gangrenous music scene to become focused and unforced".

== Discography ==
The Heartbreaks discography
- Studio albums: 1
- Extended plays: 1
- Singles: 7

=== Studio albums ===
Year	Title	Chart Positions	
Year	Title	UK	IRL
2012	Funtimes: Released: 7 May 2012; Label: Nusic Sounds LLP (SICCD006)		
2014	We May Yet Stand A Chance: Released: 2 June 2014; Label: Nusic Sounds		

=== EPs ===
Year	Title	Chart Positions	
Year	Title	UK	IRL
2010	Rip It Up: Released: February 2010; Label: Fierce Panda (NING 229); Various artists EP; The Heartbreaks track: Jealous, Don't You Know (demo)		

=== Singles ===
Year	Single	Album	Chart positions	
Year	Single	Album	UK	JP
2010	"Liar, My Dear"	Non-album release		
2010	"I Didn't Think It Would Hurt To Think Of You"	Non-album release		
2011	"Jealous, Don't You Know"	Non-album release		
2012	"Delay, Delay"	Funtimes	–	9
2012	"Polly"	Funtimes		
2013	"Hand On Heart"	Funtimes		
2013	"What Are You Doing, Fool?" (with Edwyn Collins)	Record Store Day release		
2013	"¡No Pasarán!"	We May Yet Stand A Chance		
2014	"Hey, Hey Lover"	We May Yet Stand A Chance		
2014	"Absolved"	We May Yet Stand A Chance		
