= Not Nineteen Forever =

Single by The Courteeners

from the album St. Jude
- Released: 31 March 2008
- Recorded: 2007
- Genre: Indie rock; post-punk revival
- Length: 4:05
- Label: Polydor
- Songwriter: Liam Fray
- Producer: Stephen Street

The Courteeners singles chronology
"What Took You So Long" (2008)	"Not Nineteen Forever" (2008)	"No You Didn't, No You Don't" (2008)

"Not Nineteen Forever" is the fourth single released by the English indie rock band The Courteeners. Taken from their debut studio album St. Jude, it was released on 31 March 2008 on a CD and two 7" singles. It reached #19 in the UK singles chart making it the highest charting Courteeners single to date. In 2013, it was used by Manchester United to celebrate their 20th Premier League title triumph. The song is featured on Pro Evolution Soccer 2010.

== Background ==
The lyrics concern a conversation between a young man and his older girlfriend, who is disappointed by his wild and hedonistic behaviour that night, and she drives him for 'tea and toast'. He flirts with her in the car, but she reminds him he's only young and needs to get his life together. He goes out again and chases another woman, but she disappears before he can make conversation. He muses about how she probably wasn't worth chasing before understanding his girlfriend's words.

== Release ==
The single was released on 31 March 2008 as both a CD single and as two alternate 7" singles. It managed to enter the UK Singles Chart at a peak of #19, making it the Courteeners' most successful single to date.

== Track listing ==
- CD
1. "Not Nineteen Forever" – 4:05
2. "Smiths Disco" – 2:47
- 7" (1)
1. "Not Nineteen Forever"
2. "Trying Too Hard To Score"
- 7" (2)
1. "Not Nineteen Forever"
2. "If It Wasn't For Me" (demo)

== Charts ==
=== Weekly charts ===
Chart (2008)	Peak position
Scotland (OCC)	10
UK Singles (OCC)	19

== Certifications ==
Region	Certification	Certified units/sales
United Kingdom (BPI)	2× Platinum	1,200,000^{‡}
^{‡} Sales+streaming figures based on certification alone.
