= Courteeners =

English band

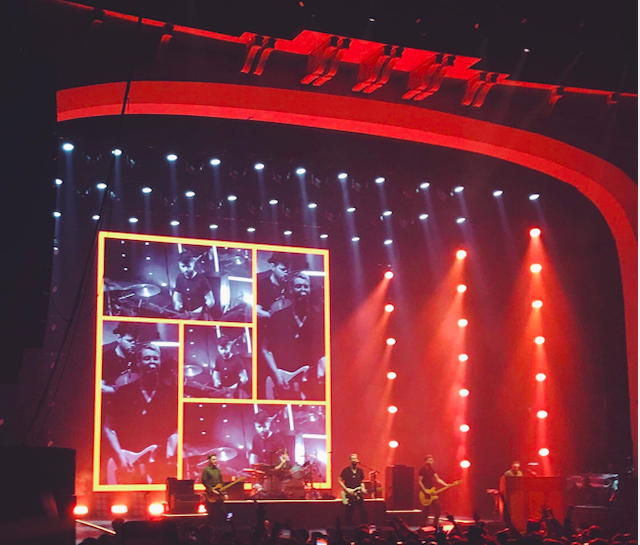
- Courteeners performing at the O₂ Brixton Academy in 2018

Background information
- Origin: Middleton, Greater Manchester, England
- Genres: Indie rock; post-Britpop; post-punk revival; synth-pop
- Years active: 2006–present
- Labels: Polydor; PIAS Cooperative; Ignition
- Members: Liam Fray; Michael Campbell; Daniel "Conan" Moores; Joseph "Joe" Cross; Elina Lin
- Past members: Mark Cuppello
- Website: thecourteeners.com

Courteeners are an English band formed in Middleton, Greater Manchester, in 2006 by Liam Fray, Michael Campbell, and Mark Cuppello, with Daniel "Conan" Moores joining shortly after to replace the band's initial guitarist.; Mark Cuppello was replaced by the band's producer Joe Cross in 2015. They previously toured with pianist Adam Payne, who has been featured on every album, but in 2019 was replaced with Elina Lin. In December 2012, the band dropped "The" from their name, continuing simply as "Courteeners". In 2024, Cross and Lin became official members of the band.

They have released seven studio albums: St. Jude (2008), Falcon (2010), Anna (2013), Concrete Love (2014), Mapping the Rendezvous (2016), More. Again. Forever. (2020) and Pink Cactus Café (2024). Furthermore, the band has released several EPs and two DVD albums.

All the music and lyrics for the Courteeners' songs are written by the band's frontman Liam Fray. He says all of the songs he has written are about personal experiences.

== History ==
=== 2006–2007: Formation ===
The original band members have known each other since they were ten years old, all of them being from Middleton; Liam Fray and Daniel Moores attended Cardinal Langley Roman Catholic High School in Middleton, while Mark Cuppello attended St Monica's RC High School in Prestwich and Michael Campbell attended St Cuthbert's RC High School in Rochdale.

At first Fray studied business studies at university, however soon realised it was a lot harder than he thought and not what he wanted to do. Therefore, he chose to study creative writing as he enjoyed writing poetry and short stories, but not reading. While at the University of Salford (studying creative writing), Fray started performing acoustic sets as a singer-songwriter around bars and at open-mic nights in Manchester. After getting positive reactions from the crowd, Fray decided to leave university and form a band. He recruited long-time friend and neighbour Michael Campbell, who had never played the drums before. Prior to the finalisation of the classic lineup, a guitarist named Andrew (Drew) joined the group alongside bassist Mark Cuppello, before being replaced by rhythm guitarist Daniel "Conan" Moores.

Their first gig was at the Manchester Roadhouse in October 2006, and the band went from strength to strength in Manchester, largely through a word-of-mouth following brought on by extensive gigging and television publicity. The Courteeners released their debut single "Cavorting," on August 6, 2007, by Loog Records. A second single, 'Acrylic' was released on 22 October 2007 reaching number 44 in the UK chart.

=== 2007–2009: St. Jude ===
The Courteeners performing at the OXEGEN '08 festival in Ireland.

The Courteeners were approached by producer, Stephen Street of The Smiths, Blur and Morrissey fame about the possibility of working together. They first released a single "What Took You So Long?" on 14 January 2008, a song which reached No. 20 in the United Kingdom charts. The debut album, St. Jude, was released on 7 April 2008 by Polydor Records. It was launched at Manchester's Market Street HMV store.

The album reached No. 4 in the UK Albums Chart, and has since gone on to achieve gold status. The album was preceded by the release of single "Not Nineteen Forever" on 31 March 2008, entering at No. 19 and becoming their highest-charting single to date. A fifth single, "No You Didn't, No You Don't" was released on 23 June 2008.

The band played to a packed out John Peel tent at the 2008 Glastonbury Festival. and played major slots at V Festival, T in the Park and other festivals across Europe. They played with Kasabian and Primal Scream at the Fuji Rock Festival in Niigata Prefecture in Japan.

"That Kiss" was released on 6 October 2008, produced again by Stephen Street. The song was released as a stand-alone track and entered the charts at number five in the Midweek Top 40.

By October 2008 the band had begun a sell out tour of major venues across the UK including two nights at Manchester Apollo and London's Shepherd's Bush Empire. A first taste of Arena shows came with their December 2008 support slot on the Stereophonics' Decade in the Sun Tour. This saw them appear at huge venues such as the Manchester Arena, London's O2 Arena and Glasgow's Scottish Exhibition and Conference Centre.

December 2008 saw the band crowned inaugural winners of the Guardian's First British Album Award beating off strong competition from Glasvegas, Duffy, Adele and Noah and the Whale. The award was voted for by members of the public and the Guardian journalists. St. Jude clinched a mammoth 53% of the public vote.

In March 2009 the band made their US debut with a headline show at New York's Mercury Lounge, followed by a month touring the States as special guests of Morrissey on his 'Tour of Refusal'. Over 18 dates included appearances at New York's famous Carnegie Hall, the Dallas Palladium and Albuquerque's Sunshine Theatre. They completed their tour of America at the 2009 Coachella Festival in Indio, California, performing on the festival's main stage along with Paul McCartney, Morrissey and Franz Ferdinand. In the UK the band played the 2009 Reading and Leeds Festivals on the main stage along with Arctic Monkeys, The Prodigy and Ian Brown. They also appeared at the 2009 T in the Park Festival as second headliners in the King Tut's Wah Wah Tent.

=== 2009–2012: Falcon ===
The band's second album Falcon was released on 22 February 2010 and has since gone on to achieve gold status. The album was preceded by a single "You Overdid It Doll" on 15 February 2010. The album was recorded at ICP Studios in Belgium and produced by Ed Buller (White Lies, Pulp, Suede). The album was well received by the British music press with NME awarding the album 8/10 and both Mojo & Q Magazines giving the album 4-star reviews. In Falcon's first week it entered the top 10 in 6th place.

Many songs from the band's second album including "The Opener", "You Overdid It Doll" and "Take Over the World" made their live debuts at two UK shows in December 2009. The first at Warrington's Parr Hall was followed by a sold-out headline homecoming show at the 10,000-capacity Manchester Central (formerly known as Manchester GMEX). Tickets for the show sold out within a week.

The first song released from the album was "Cross My Heart and Hope To Fly", making its radio debut on Zane Lowe's BBC Radio 1 show as his Hottest Record in the World. The track was released as a free download through their official website on 7 December 2009 as well as a seven-inch version with a B-side.

Falcon's first official single "You Overdid It Doll" was released a week before the album's release on 15 February 2010. This also saw its radio debut on BBC Radio 1's Zane Lowe show. Lowe, a big supporter throughout the band's career, once again made it his Hottest Record in the World. The single was added to daytime radio playlists including BBC Radio One, XFM, and BBC 6 Music. A UK Tour to coincide with the album's release was announced in December 2009. The tour included dates at London's Brixton Academy, Blackburn's King George's Hall and Blackpool's Empress Ballroom.

The band appeared at many festivals during the summer of 2010, including on the Other Stage at 2010 Glastonbury Festival on Friday 25 June 2010. On Sunday 13 June 2010 the band appeared on the main stage at the Isle of Wight Festival. The performed on the main stage ahead of Paul McCartney's headline appearance that evening. In July 2010 the band returned to the T in the Park festival, appearing on the Saturday evening on the Radio 1/NME Stage. In August 2010, the Courteeners announced a five-date UK tour to take place in December. The tour included the band's largest-ever headline gig at the Manchester Arena. The band returned to Japan at the beginning of August 2010, appearing in Tokyo and Osaka at the Summersonic 2010 festival. In August 2010 the band made their second appearance at V Festival, performing on the 4 music stage.

On 5 November 2010, the Courteeners announced a 5-song EP on their official website which include 2 songs from Falcon, "Lullaby" and "Scratch Your Name Upon My Lips". There are two brand new songs "Three Months" and "Swear Down" plus a cover version of Yeah Yeah Yeahs' "Zero". The EP was released on 5 December 2010. The band performed a sell-out tour of the UK in December 2010 which included the band's biggest headline show to date up until their sold-out 25,000 gig at Heaton Park in June 2015.

On 17 December 2010, the band announced a headline show at Delamere Forest, scheduled for 2 July 2011. The show sold out in 38 minutes, a record for shows performed in the forest. David Barrow, booker for the Forestry Commission said, "Following their triumphant MEN Arena show last weekend I knew we would comfortably sell out, but 38 minutes is a forest record, so it's official the Courteeners are the fastest selling forest act we have had since the gigs kicked off 11 years ago. The previous record was held by JLS last year".

During the 2011 summer festival season they appeared at Isle of Wight Festival and the V Festival. They also played a headline show at Haigh Hall, Wigan in June of that year with support from The Coral and Cherry Ghost. In December the band played three sold-out shows at the Manchester Apollo followed by the DVD Live at the MEN Arena, which featured the band's December 2010 show at the Manchester Arena. In 2012, the band played at the Reading and Leeds Festivals, Scotland's 'T in the Park' and the Chester Rocks Festival.

On 23 June 2012, the band played a free show in Manchester's Albert Square in the shadow of the town hall. The gig was to celebrate the Olympic torch coming to Manchester for the London 2012 Olympics. The band played their first-ever show in Istanbul, Turkey on 16 November 2012. On 7 December 2012 the band played a sold-out show at the 16,000-capacity Manchester Arena.

=== 2013–2014: Anna ===
Their third album Anna, recorded with Hurts producer Joe Cross, was released on 4 February 2013. It preceded by the release of the first single, "Lose Control" in December 2012 when the band introduced themselves as "Courteeners", dropping "The" from their name. On 6 February 2013 it was announced that Anna was Number 1 in the Official midweek UK Chart by the Official UK Charts Company. Sales slipped as the week progressed, and the album charted at Number 6.

In support of the album the band embarked on a UK and European "Anna Tour" with 22 shows in England, Scotland, Ireland, Wales, France, Austria, Italy, Germany, the Netherlands and Switzerland. Tour began on 21 February and ended on 27 April.

On 28 June 2013 they played at the Glastonbury Festival on the John Peel Stage. They played 13 songs and the performance was their fourth appearance at the festival. The band supported The Stone Roses at their reunion gig in London's Finsbury Park on 7 June 2013 and Kings of Leon at Glasgow's Bellahouston Park on 15 August 2013. They also performed at the Belsonic, Benicàssim, T in the Park, V festivals and headlined Mallorca Rocks closing party.

On 5 and 6 July 2013 Courteeners played at Castlefield Bowl, Deansgate, Manchester with support acts including The Strypes, Miles Kane and The Heartbreaks. All 16,000 tickets were sold out in a day.

In December 2013, the band toured the UK once again culminating in their 3rd headline appearance at the 16,000 capacity Manchester Arena.

=== 2014–2016: Concrete Love ===
Courteeners released their new album Concrete Love on 18 August 2014. Again recorded with producer Joe Cross in Paris, Whitby and Ancoats, it debuted at number 3 in the UK Albums Chart, marking the band's highest chart entry to date. The first taster from the album, 'Summer' was made available on streaming in July. The first official release from the album was the How Good It Was EP released on 21 July 2014. It featured the title track and the songs "Hometown One", "Sunflower" and "Why Are You Still With Him?" and reached number 2 on the official UK iTunes chart. Singles from Concrete Love, "Has He Told You That He Loves You Yet" and "Small Bones" became XFM's records of the week. The latter was the last XFM's Record of the Week before the station has rebranded as Radio X.

The band headlined the Radio One/NME Stage at the Reading and Leeds Festivals 2014 and appeared as special guests of The Killers in Summer Sessions gig at Glasgow's Bellahouston Park. They also performed at the Benicàssim and Umbria Rock festivals.

The album was supported by a 19-date UK Tour in October and November, including shows at Brixton Academy in London and Echo Arena Liverpool.

On 5 June 2015, the band played one of their biggest headline gigs at Manchester's Heaton Park, supported by Blossoms, Bipolar Sunshine and Peace. All 25,000 tickets were sold out in 40 minutes. Q Magazine gave the gig 5 out of 5 stars, describing it as "their equivalent of the Stone Roses’ Spike Island or Oasis’ Maine Road... less like a performance, more like a reciprocal communion."

On 9 July 2015, Courteeners supported The Libertines at Dublin's 3Arena. They also played at Glastonbury Festival, Isle of Wight Festival, Ibiza Rocks, V Festival and T in the Park.

On 27 November 2015, the band released Concrete Love – Extra Love, a deluxe expanded edition of their last album Concrete Love. It features a new single, their first Christmas song "Winter Wonderland", a collection of unreleased acoustic versions of Concrete Love album tracks and rare EP tracks.

Liam Fray wrote "Winter Wonderland" on the piano at Norah Jones' New York City home. He played it live for the first time in 2011 after Lou Reed invited him to perform at his Arts club, The Stone in Manhattan. The song was produced by Stephen Street and recorded at London's Miloco Studios in September 2015. On 16 November the single got its first radio play on Radio X. It became both Radio X and BBC Radio 2's Record of the Week and was included in the Radio X's "The 50 Best Tracks of 2015" list.

On 23 November 2015, Courteeners were on the Radio X Road Trip with Chris Moyles to celebrate the newly rebranded Radio X (formerly XFM). They played at O2 Academy Leeds.

On 25 November 2015, it was confirmed that Courteeners have parted ways with their bassist Mark Cuppello. He was replaced by their good friend and long time collaborator Joe Cross.

In November and December the band embarked on a UK tour that initially included 5 consecutive nights at Manchester Apollo which is unprecedented for any band at the venue. After the whole tour including London, Glasgow and Manchester was sold out within minutes, 2 additional Manchester dates were added meaning the band are set to play 7 nights at Manchester Apollo. Courteeners also added and sold out an extra London show at London Forum and a second Glasgow show. They were supported by Fronteers, Blossoms, The Travelling Band, Viola Beach and Reverend & the Makers, among others.

On 19 June 2016, Courteeners supported The Stone Roses at Manchester's Etihad Stadium. They also played at the T in the Park and Reading and Leeds festivals.

=== 2016–2018: Mapping the Rendezvous ===
During their slot at T in the Park on 8 July 2016, Liam Fray mentioned that they had "finished recording their newest album", hinting its upcoming release.

On 11 August 2015, the band announced their fifth album Mapping the Rendezvous, which was once again produced by Joe Cross and released on 28 October 2016. Its first single "The 17th" aired just after midnight that night on Radio X and was released on Spotify and iTunes along with the ability to preorder the upcoming album. It is the first release with the band's new record label, Ignition Records.

Speaking to Radio X, Liam Fray said, "last year was unreal, the biggest and best we've ever had. Now we're back again to show that you don’t have to be perfect to be loved and that lost causes are the ones most worth sticking with. We’ve finally finished our best (and dare I even suggest, sexiest) set of songs ever so get ready to unleash your inner Danny Zuko and prepare to be (at least mildly) impressed."

The deluxe version of the album, which was recorded at Real World Studios In Paris, includes a DVD of the band's sell out headline gig at Heaton Park on 5 June 2015 where they played to 25,000 people.

On 29 August 2016, their second single "No One Will Ever Replace Us" from the upcoming album, was premiered on Radio X. It was released midnight on 30 August on iTunes and Spotify. Their third single from the album entitled "Kitchen" was released on 30 September 2016 at midnight, to a widely mixed reception of views.

In support of the album the band embarked on a UK and European tour playing throughout November and December in England, Scotland, Ireland, Germany, Switzerland and France.

On 27 May 2017, Courteeners played their biggest gig to date, a sold-out headline homecoming show to 50,000 people at Emirates Old Trafford, Manchester with support acts The Charlatans, Cabbage and Blossoms.

On 25 June 2017 Courteeners played at the Glastonbury Festival on The Other Stage. It was their sixth appearance at the festival in 10 years since their debut in 2007. They also performed at the Sziget, Benicassim and NOS Alive festivals.

=== 2018: St. Jude Re:Wired ===
The Courteeners performed a series of shows to celebrate 10 years of their debut release at the King George's Hall in Blackburn then 2 days later at The Royal Albert Hall to support Teenage Cancer Trust on 23 March 2018. The shows were followed by a warm-up show at The 02 Academy in Sheffield and by a sell-out crowd at Manchester Arena on 7 April 2018.

Courteeners also played at the TRNSMT 2018 festival and headlined slots at both Neighbourhood Weekender and Truck Festival.

=== 2019–present: More. Again. Forever. ===
On 29 October 2018, Courteeners announced a new headline show at Heaton Park, Manchester on Saturday 15 June 2019. The line up included James, DMA'S and Pale Waves as support acts. Tickets for the show went on sale on 2 November 2018 and all 50,000 tickets had sold out in less than four hours. In 2020, Courteeners released their sixth studio album, More. Again. Forever. to favourable critical reviews. In September 2021, Courteeners played to a sold out Old Trafford for the second time. In 2022 the band also headlined Neighbourhood Weekender for a second time in 4 years.

=== 2023: St. Jude: 15th Anniversary Edition ===
On 30 August 2022, the band announced that St. Jude would be reissued on 13 January 2023, in a new 2-CD set to mark its 15th anniversary. They announced another gig at Heaton Park for 9 June 2023 the same day, the tickets for which sold out in eight hours, marking the band's third sold-out concert there. The reissued St. Jude topped the UK Albums Chart, becoming the band's first release to do so. It also set an Albums Chart record as the album with the longest gap between release and reaching number one, at 14 years, 9 months and 14 days.

== Other appearances ==
Noel Gallagher invited the band to support him at the Royal Albert Hall on 25 March 2010. The show was in aid of the Teenage Cancer Trust. It was the band's first appearance at the venue.

Aside from the band, the Courteeners' lead singer, guitarist and songwriter Liam Fray also performs acoustic solo shows, playing band's songs. On 18 August 2011 he performed a headline set at the re-opening of Salford Lads' Club with Xfm Manchester. He told the NME: "I used to go to Salford University and I would see from the bus in the morning Japanese and American tourists outside having their picture taken. We were joking about opening the doors at two in the afternoon so everyone at the gig can get their photo on the way in! It's a massive landmark and it's a pleasure and privilege to play it." The show was hosted by XFM Manchester Breakfast Show presenter Tim Cocker and broadcast on the same station. Fray also performed a special solo set at Neighbourhood Festival, the Albert Hall, Manchester on 8 October 2016.

On 13 May 2013 Courteeners played a free set in Albert Square as part of the Manchester United Premier League Victory Parade after their song, "Not Nineteen Forever", was named the official title song by the club following their record 20th league championship victory. The song was also played at a number of matches, including the game when they won the title and the final home game.

== Reception ==
Morrissey has expressed his appreciation of the Courteeners on numerous occasions. After seeing the Courteeners in Camden, Morrissey played their song "What Took You So Long?" on American radio station KRCW, where he heaped praise on the band saying that "Every song was very strong and full of hooks and full of dynamics and I thought, 'this is great' and that so many groups in the UK, they're hyped and they're huge and they're all over the press and they don't really actually have any songs, they don't really have anything to offer ... but it's different with the Courteeners, they actually do have very good, strong songs." Morrissey added to his praise that "I think they will make it here [in the US] and I think you'll come across them." The Courteeners joined Morrissey on his American tour in spring 2009 in support of his new album Years of Refusal.

Following the release of their debut album St. Jude, U2 frontman Bono called the Courteeners "The best band of the past 10 years".

In November 2015, Courteeners were included in the Radio X's "The 15 Greatest Manchester Bands of All Time" list. In 2016, their song "Not Nineteen Forever" was ranked No. 59 in Radio X's "Best of British" (The top 100 best British songs of all time) poll.

== Humanitarian efforts ==
Some of the proceeds of 'Not Nineteen Forever' went to the Manchester United Foundation, raising funds for "Francis House Children's Hospice" and The Christie NHS Foundation Trust.

In December 2014, after a special Paul Heaton's benefit concert 'Hope for Christmas' Courteeners donated over £1,000 to two foodbanks including one of their hometown of Middleton.

In December 2015, Courteeners released their first Christmas song "Winter Wonderland". All the band's profits from the release of this single were donated to UK housing and homeless charity "Shelter".

On 2 April 2016, Courteeners (initially billed as 'Liam Fray') headlined a tribute concert for Viola Beach in Warrington, with all proceeds going towards the families of the band members and their manager. Viola Beach, who were killed in a car crash in Sweden together with their manager Craig Tarry, previously supported Courteeners on three of their UK tour 2015 dates.

On 9 September 2017, Courteeners along with Noel Gallagher, Blossoms and other artists performed at the "We Are Manchester" benefit gig at the reopened Manchester Arena with proceeds going to the Manchester Memorial Fund, a charitable fund to pay for a permanent memorial to the victims of the Manchester attack. The venue involved in May's terror attack at an Ariana Grande concert that left 22 people dead.

On 24 May 2019, Courteeners along with Blossoms, Bugzy Malone and other artists performed at Victoria Warehouse for the inaugural ‘Raise The Roof’ benefit gig, the proceeds went towards the homeless in the city area.

== Awards and nominations ==
- Guardian First British Album Award 2008 (Inaugural year)
  - Guardian First British Album Award – St. Jude – Winners

== Band members ==
=== Current members ===
- Liam Fray – lead vocals, guitar (2006–present)
- Daniel "Conan" Moores – guitar (2006–present)
- Michael Campbell – drums and percussion, backing vocals (2006–present)
- Joseph "Joe" Cross – bass (2024–present; touring 2015-2024)
- Elina Lin – keyboards and backing vocals (2024-present; touring 2019-2024)

=== Former members ===
- Mark Cuppello – bass (2006–2015)
- Andrew "Drew" – guitar (2006)

=== Former touring members ===
- Adam Payne – keyboards and backing vocals (2008–2018)

== Discography ==
Studio albums

- St. Jude (2008)
- Falcon (2010)
- Anna (2013)
- Concrete Love (2014)
- Mapping the Rendezvous (2016)
- More. Again. Forever. (2020)
- Pink Cactus Café (2024)
