= Anna (Courteeners album) =

Studio album by Courteeners
- Released: 4 February 2013
- Recorded: 2012
- Genre: Indie pop
- Length: 42:03
- Labels: V2, Cooperative Music
- Producer: Joseph Cross

Courteeners chronology
Falcon (2010)	Anna (2013)	Concrete Love (2014)

Singles from Anna
- 1. "Lose Control" Released: 10 December 2012; 2. "Van Der Graaff" Released: 6 May 2013; 3. "Are You in Love with a Notion?" Released: 6 December 2013

Anna is the third studio album by British rock band Courteeners. It was released on 4 February 2013 through V2 Records and Cooperative Music. Following their second studio album Falcon (2010), the band took a break at the end of 2010. They played a few shows in 2011, spending most of the year working on their next album, debuting some new songs in the process. After frontman Liam Fray broke his ankle, he re-listened to the material they had up to that point and felt they could be improved on. Following a meeting with Joseph Cross, he was enlisted to produce the band's next album; sessions were held at 80 Hertz Studios. Anna is an indie pop album that leans more into the electronic elements found on Falcon.

Anna received mixed reviews from critics, with some commenting on the production, while others thought the songs were uninspired. The album reached number six in the United Kingdom, number seven in Scotland and number 85 in Ireland. Following its completion, Courteeners appeared at various festivals leading up to a one-off show at the Manchester Arena, and the release of the lead single "Lose Control" in December 2012. The band toured the UK shortly afterwards; "Van Der Graaff" was released as the album's second single in May 2013. They ended the year with another UK tour, and the release of the album's third and final single "Are You in Love with a Notion?" in December 2013. "Lose Control" charted on the lower end of the Scottish and UK Singles Charts. Anna was certified silver in the UK by the British Phonographic Industry in 2017.

== Background ==
Courteeners released their second studio album Falcon through A&M Records in February 2010. It peaked at number six in the UK Albums Chart; out of its three singles, "You Overdid It Doll" reached the highest at number 24 in the United Kingdom. The album was promoted with two tours of the UK, as well as various festival appearances, including Glastonbury, Isle of Wight and T in the Park. During one performance, they debuted three new songs, one of which being "Push Yourself". The touring cycle for the album concluded by December 2010; frontman Liam Fray said the band would take a brief break before starting to work on their next album. Sometime after, they had accumulated six-to-seven new songs, though Fray was unsure of what direction they would take. He explained that the material on Falcon were written as acoustic songs, whereas for the new material, he was "building [them] up and getting drum beats and bass parts down" prior to them entering a studio.

In June and July 2011, the band performed at Delamere Forest, in addition to playing at the Haigh Live and Isle of Wight Festivals. During these shows, they debuted "Save Rosemary in Time". They spent the rest of the year working on their new album at a studio in Manchester, with the intent on releasing it early in the following year. At the end of the year, the band played three UK shows in their hometown of Manchester in December 2011. They debuted three new songs, included "Lose Control" and "Welcome to the Rave". Fray broke his ankle on New Year's Day 2012, tearing ligaments in the process, resulting in him needing four months to recover. This period of time allowed him to re-listen to the songs they had up to that point, which he felt could be improved upon.

Fray became aware of Joseph Cross from his production work on Happiness (2010) by Hurts, as well as Cross' own material under the moniker Performance. Fray intentionally wanted to work with someone within the members' age range; he met Cross while at a party, who inquired about what new material the band had. Fray told him about "Lose Control" and "Welcome to the Rave", by which Cross was interested based on the descriptions Fray had given him. The pair later met up and discussed various topics, before eventually talking about what the band wanted from their next album. Fray wished for it to be more up-tempo to counter the mid-pace tone of Falcon. Anna was recorded at 80 Hertz Studios with Cross as the producer. In July 2012, Fray announced the album was finished and in the process of being mixed.

== Composition and lyrics ==
Anna is an indie pop album that expands on the use of synthesizers and incorporation of electronic sounds that were partially alluded to with Falcon. The piano work in the opening song "Are You in Love with a Notion?" evokes the sound of Doves, and describes a woman who enjoys the idea of love than the person she is with. "Lose Control" toys with indie disco and arena rock, recalling the Falcon track "You Overdid It Doll". Both it and "Are You in Love with a Notion?" are energetic songs with 1980s new wave production. "Van Der Graaff" comes across as a mix of the works of Doves and Sigur Rós. Fray said it dealt with "choices, temptation [...] Something that you want, but you know you really shouldn’t. The angel and the devil on either shoulder scenario". "Push Yourself" is reminiscent of the disco-rock direction of Two Door Cinema Club and Franz Ferdinand. Fray referred to it as "industrial Motown", which they almost jokingly titled it.

"When You Want Something You Can't Have" is a ballad that was inspired by "The Only Living Boy in New York" (1970) by Simon & Garfunkel, while "Welcome to the Rave" is synthesizer-centric song. Discussing "The Sharks Are Circling", Fray said over time the guest list for their shows would get "longer, you recognise less and less people, and I just started to put my foot down. I don’t know who you are, if you want to come – buy a ticket like everyone else". "Marquee" is a violin-driven song that lacks drums, while "Money" is a glam rock and space rock track, styled after the work of Muse and Kings of Leon. The album's closing song "Here Come the Young Men" features guitar riffs in the style of the Vaccines. It evolved out of "Gin on Friday", a song that dated back from the period of their 2007 debut single "Cavorting"; while "Gin on Friday" revolved about being in one's late teens, "Here Come the Young Men" saw the band "looking back over those years, but also saying that we’re not finished yet".

== Release ==
Between June and August 2012, Courteeners appeared at the Chester Rocks, T in the Park and Reading and Leeds Festivals festivals, as well as a one-off show in Manchester to coincide with that year's Olympic Games. On 8 November 2012, Anna was announced for release in three months' time; alongside this, the album's track listing was posted online. Four days later, the artwork was revealed, showing a woman in front of cooling towers, wearing sunglasses with a reflection of a horse in them. Fray said they wanted to hire a newcomer to do the art, instead of finding a well-known artist, eventually coming across Paul X Johnson through mutual friends. Fray described the final artwork as attempting to "convey that kind of elegance but a bit more industrial". In December 2012, the band played another one-off show in Manchester, this time at the Manchester Arena, with support from the View, and at XFM's Winter Wonderland radio festival.

Though originally scheduled for 28 January 2013, "Lose Control" was released as the album's lead single a month early on 10 December 2012; the seven-inch vinyl record edition featured "Chipping Away" as its B-side. The music video for "Lose Control" was posted on YouTube four days later. Anna was released on 4 February 2013. It was promoted with two in-store acoustic performances and a UK tour that lasted until March 2013, with support from the Tapestry. A music video for "Van Der Graaff" was released on 10 April 2013, consisting of live footage. The song was released as the album's second single on 6 May 2013; the seven-inch vinyl edition featured a live version of "Last of the Ladies" as its B-side, while the digital download version included "Let Down Your Guard" and a remix of "Van Der Graaff".

They played a warm-up show in Liverpool, leading up to an appearance at Glastonbury Festival. In July 2013, they played two shows at the Castlefield Bowl in Manchester, with support from Miles Kane, the Heartbreaks, the Strypes, James Skelly & the Intenders and Findlay. In September 2013, the band performed at the Ibiza Rocks festival and Fray embarked on a solo acoustic tour of the UK, some shows included matinee performances. The music video for "Are You in Love with a Notion?" was posted on YouTube on 13 November 2013. In December 2013, the band toured across the UK to close out the year, after which they went on hiatus. "Are You in Love with a Notion?" was released as the album's third single on 6 December 2013; the seven-inch vinyl edition featured a remix of "Are You in Love with a Notion?" as its B-side, while the digital download version included the remix and an acoustic demo.

== Reception ==
Professional ratings
Aggregate scores
Source	Rating
AnyDecentMusic?	5.3/10
Metacritic	59/100
Review scores
Source	Rating
AllMusic	3/5 stars
Clash	3/10
Evening Standard	3/5 stars
God Is in the TV	2.5/5
Hot Press	5/10
The Irish Times	2/5 stars
Islington Gazette	2/5 stars
musicOMH	3/5 stars
NME	7/10
PopMatters	8/10 stars

Anna was met with mixed reviews from music critics. At Metacritic, the album received an average score of 59, based on nine reviews. AnyDecentMusic? gave it an average score of 5.3, based on 12 reviews.

PopMatters contributor Ben Olson saw Anna as being "every bit as infectious as their impressive debut, but it is bigger, glossier, and clearly intended to be played in massive, sold out stadiums". BBC Music's Natalie Hardwick noted that the album was "strategic in its experimentation, but represents a fairly dramatic departure from its makers’ brand, so hats off to that". AllMusic reviewer Heather Phares said the album follows the "polished, anthemic vein" of Falcon, while "bring[ing] back some of the swagger [from their debut] that was missing from those songs". God Is in the TV writer Ben P Scott said the album's biggest drawback was that the "good stuff seems to be at the start and end of the record [...] most of what you’ll hear in between these bookends is quite underwhelming". The Irish Times's Lauren Murphy echoed a similar sentiment, stating that the most prominent issue with the band's "output is that it’s simply far too ordinary", explaining that it "rarely switch[es] tempo beyond a sturdy, mid-placed plod".

Islington Gazette's Stephen Moore commented that the "sluggish feel to much of the LP that drowns out, or at least distracts from, what was once a key strength". Jamie Carson of Clash said it was "full of uninspired and recycled riffs starkly illuminated by the God awful woe-is-me-I’m-northern lyrics". NME writer Jamie Fullerton said Anna "falls frustratingly short of hitting the back of the net", though acknowledged that "[a]t its best it’s the sound of a band shining brighter than most in recent memory". Evening Standard writer Rick Pearson added to this, stating that Fray "Fray veers from swaggering rabble-rouser [...] to trembling balladeer [...], without ever establishing an identity of his own". He ended that "overall result is unconvincing: the jury is still out on The Courteeners". musicOMH contributor Howard Gorman countered this by writing that Fray's "solid vocals keep the album on track and worthy of hearing through to the end".

Though Anna was in the running to top the UK Albums Chart during the mid-week, it ultimately peaked at number six, losing out to the Les Misérables soundtrack. It was certified silver in the UK by the British Phonographic Industry (BPI) in 2017. The album also reached number seven in Scotland and number 85 in Ireland. "Lose Control" charted at number 79 in Scotland and number 82 in the UK. "Are You in Love with a Notion?" was certified silver in the UK by the BPI in 2020.

== Track listing ==
All tracks are written by Liam Fray.

No.	Title	Length
1.	"Are You in Love with a Notion?"	4:15
2.	"Lose Control"	3:48
3.	"Van Der Graaff"	3:41
4.	"Push Yourself"	3:25
5.	"When You Want Something You Can't Have"	4:06
6.	"Welcome to the Rave"	4:07
7.	"Save Rosemary in Time"	3:27
8.	"The Sharks Are Circling"	4:17
9.	"Marquee"	3:59
10.	"Money"	3:23
11.	"Here Come the Young Men"	3:40

== Credits ==
The Courteeners

- Liam Fray – vocals and guitars
- Daniel Moores – guitars
- Mark Cuppello – bass guitars
- Michael Campbell – drums

Additional personnel

- Continuous
- Rob Crane – design
- George Atkins – engineer
- Adam Payne – keyboards
- Robin Schmidt – mastering
- Mike Crossey – mixing
- Paul X. Johnson – painting

== Charts and certifications ==
=== Weekly charts ===
Chart performance for Anna
Chart (2013)	Peak position
Irish Albums (IRMA)	85
Scottish Albums (Official Charts)	7
UK Albums (Official Charts)	6
UK Album Downloads (Official Charts)	2
Chart (2015)	Peak position
UK Independent Albums (Official Charts)	38

=== Certifications ===
Certifications for Anna
Region	Certification	Certified units/sales
United Kingdom (BPI)	Silver	60,000^{‡}
^{‡} Sales+streaming figures based on certification alone.
