= Cavorting =

Single by the Courteeners

from the album St. Jude
- Released: 6 August 2007
- Length: 3:06
- Label: Polydor
- Songwriter(s): Liam Fray
- Producer(s): Tom Knott

The Courteeners singles chronology
"Cavorting" (2007)	"Acrylic" (2007)

"Cavorting" is the first single by the Manchester indie rock band the Courteeners. The single was released in the United Kingdom on 6 August 2007 as both a CD single and a 7-inch vinyl. It was the lead single from the band's first album, St. Jude.

== Chart performance ==
"Cavorting" was met with local success on its release on 6 August 2007, debuting on the UK chart at number 192. It was NME's Single of The Week.

== Track listing ==
CD Single
No.	Title	Length
1.	"Cavorting"	3:06
2.	"No You Didn't, No You Don't"	3:59

Vinyl
No.	Title	Length
1.	"Cavorting"	3:06
2.	"No You Didn't, No You Don't"	3:59

== Credits ==
- Producer – Tom Knott
- Written by [words and music) – Liam Fray

== Charts ==
Chart (2007)	Peak position
UK Singles (OCC)	192

== Certifications ==
Region	Certification	Certified units/sales
United Kingdom (BPI)	Silver	200,000^{‡}
^{‡} Sales+streaming figures based on certification alone.

== Release history ==
Region	Date	Format
United Kingdom	6 August 2007	CD Single
United Kingdom	6 August 2007	Vinyl
