= St. Jude (album) =

Studio album by the Courteeners
- Released: 7 April 2008
- Recorded: Late 2007
- Genre: Indie rock
- Length: 38:38
- Label: Polydor
- Producers: Stephen Street; Ben Hillier; Rob Kirwan

The Courteeners chronology
St. Jude (2008)	Falcon (2010)

Singles from St. Jude
- 1. "What Took You So Long?" Released: 14 January 2008; 2. "Not Nineteen Forever" Released: 31 March 2008; 3. "No You Didn't, No You Don't" Released: 23 June 2008

St. Jude is the debut studio album by the English rock band the Courteeners, released on 7 April 2008 by Polydor Records. There is also a special edition album which includes a second disc of acoustic versions of songs which feature on the actual album. Although the album was released to mixed reviews from critics, it has become a somewhat cult success though many fans are more favorable to the versions of songs seen on Here Come the Young Men EP and various other demos. In support of the album the band embarked on a European tour.

== Background and recording ==
Singer-songwriter Liam Fray had been playing acoustic shows around his hometown of Middleton, Greater Manchester for sometime prior to forming the Courteeners in 2006 with his childhood friends Daniel Moores on guitar, Mark Cupello on bass and Michael Campbell on drums. They self-released an EP, titled Ltd E.P., which consisted of early versions of "Kings of the New Road", "How Come", "Slow Down" and "Fallowfield Hillbilly". The band signed a recording contract with Loog Records, which was owned by Polydor Records, to release their debut single "Cavorting" and its B-side "No You Didn't, No You Don't" in August 2007.

When rehearsing material that would end up on the album, Fray and Campbell performed the songs in his garage. As the pair lacked a microphone equipment, Fray would end up shouting the words. While recording, Street told Fray "'you don’t have to shout this, you can sing if you want’. So it was nice to live with the songs for a bit, tackle the peaks and troughs and give some of them a bit more of a delicate feel". The album was recorded at Olympic Studios in London over six weeks in late 2007.

== Composition and lyrics ==
St. Jude is an indie rock album that takes aspect of bands from Manchester: the attitude of Oasis; the production work of the Smiths, who Street previously worked with; and the jangle pop and psychedelic elements of the Stone Roses. It is named after Christian saint Jude the Apostle, while celebrity culture serves as a reoccurring topic throughout it. Discussing his lyrical approach, Fray said: "I don't really think about it, to be honest. [...] I used to love English in school and I was always writing. I'm quite observational as well, which comes from just being nosey". He added that he wrote several of the tracks while working at a Fred Perry store on Police Street in Manchester. The album's sound has been compared to a British iteration of Kings of Leon, as exemplified by "Kings of the New Road", as well as Arctic Monkeys and the Libertines.

St. Jude opens with "Aftershow", where its opening guitar strum giving way to the pounding drums sets the tone for the rest of the material, evoking the work of Kaiser Chiefs. Fray said he had uploaded an earlier, live version of the track to Myspace in 2005, making it the band's first song. The staff at NME said "Cavorting" has Fray "tumble into a cliquey scenester club night, decree it’s 'full of over-rated, dehydrated goggle-eyed girls' and stumble out again convinced he’s far too big a rock’n’roll star to bother with any of them". "Bide Your Time" is critical of modern mores, and is reminiscent of the sound of the Kinks and the Libertines. Fray wrote it while he was holidaying in Turkey, and said it was about acquiring cheap alcohol. "What Took You So Long?" is a homage to Stagecoach buses and queueing at the post office. The title arose from Fray taking time at a post office during work hours, only for his manager to remark "what took you so long?". He thought the intro section evoked the sound of Interpol. The Motown-lite "Please Don't" sees Fray sing in a high register, akin to Ian Brown of the Stone Roses, while discussing the theme of separation. Fray explained that they were into girl groups from the 1960s, such as the Ronettes and the Shirelles. The Arctic Monkeys-esque "If It Wasn't for Me" is about looking out for one's friends.

"No You Didn't, No You Don't" sees Fray reminisce about doing cocaine during his teenage years, backed by a guitar riff in the style of Johnny Marr. Fray said it discusses other "people who don't really know you" and features Madonna, who happened to be in the studio, doing handclaps. "How Come" cribs the sound of Oasis; it talks about having manners. "Kings of the New Road" features a darker sound with its gothic guitarwork. It evolved out of a jam session that Street encouraged them to work on further. "Not Nineteen Forever" comes across as a mix of New Order and the Strokes with its disco rhythm section as it details disintegrating relationships. It has an optimistic atmosphere as Fray describes teenagers' insecurities and romantic moments, referencing the 42s nightclub in Manchester, which the band used to attend. He came up with the song in his bedroom after playing the chords to "Someday" (2002) by the Strokes in the wrong order. "Fallowfield Hillbilly" is about a person that Fray met on a bus who claimed they were an expert on Joy Division. It references "Hand in Glove" (1983) by the Smiths, and features guitar riffs evoking the work of Oasis. The album concludes with the acoustic song "Yesterday, Today & Probably Tomorrow"; in the background, noise can be heard from the Piccadilly station in Manchester. On some editions of the albums, it is followed by seven silent tracks, eventually leading to hidden track "Acrylic", which sees Fray call out bands that try to ape the sound of the Libertines.

== Release ==
The Courteeners toured throughout 2008 and 2009 for St. Jude.

The Courteeners went on a tour of the United Kingdom in September 2007. The following month, they released the non-album single "Acrylic", which was promoted with a supporting slot for the Coral. A promotional seven-inch vinyl record was released to coincide with this, featuring an acoustic version of "Bide Your Time". The Courteeners closed out the year with UK tour in December 2007. A music video for "What Took You So Long?" premiered through Digital Spy's website on 4 January 2008. The song was then released as the lead single from the band's forthcoming album on 14 January 2008; the CD edition included "Slow Down". Two versions were released on seven-inch vinyl: the first with "Not One Could I Give", while the other featured a live version of "What Took You So Long?". The band embarked on a UK tour that continued into February 2008.

On 6 February 2008, St. Jude was announced for release in two months' time. Fray played a one-off acoustic show in London in March 2008. "Not Nineteen Forever" was released as the second single from the album on 31 March 2008; the CD edition included "Smiths Disco". Two versions were released on seven-inch vinyl: the first with "Trying Too Hard to Score", while the other featured a demo version of "If It Wasn't for Me". St. Jude was released on 7 April 2008. The artwork is a painting that Fray made of actress Audrey Hepburn. It was promoted with a tour of the UK throughout the month. Over the next few months, the band performed at various festivals, including T in the Park, Ibiza Rocks, Wireless and V Festivals.

"No You Didn’t, No You Don’t" was released as the album's third single on 23 June 2008; the CD edition included covers of "I'm Sticking with You" by the Velvet Underground, "About You Now" (2007) by Sugababes and the standard "Dream a Little Dream of Me" (1931). Two versions were released on seven-inch vinyl: the first with a cover of "New Romantic" (2007) by Laura Marling, while the other featured a cover of "Out to Get You" (1993) by James. The following month, the Here Come the Young Men mini-album was released in Japan, collecting all of the songs from the "Cavorting" and "Acrylic" singles. In September and October 2008, they toured the UK again. Coinciding with this, "That Kiss" was released as a non-album single. The live EP, Live at Manchester Apollo, recorded at their most recent tour, was released on 10 October 2008. Fray then played a solo, one-off show in London that same month as part of The Best British Sound: Best of the Festivals concert series. The Courteeners closed out 2008 and opened 2009 with New Years shows in Leeds and Sheffield. They played a two UK shows and a headlining US show in New York City, prior to a stint supporting Morrissey on his tour of the US, which ran into April 2009.

St. Jude was re-pressed on vinyl in 2018 as part of that year's Record Store Day. Preceded by a version of "Not Nineteen Forever", the Courteeners released a reimagined version of the album, under the name St. Jude Re:Wired, through Ignition Records that same year. This version was birthed from Fray revisiting the Courteeners' back catalogue while on a solo acoustic tour in late 2017. On the day following the final show of the tour, Fray and the other members of the band went into a studio to re-work St. Jude. It promoted this with two headlining performances in London and Manchester, as well as performing at the Neighbourhood Weekender, TRNSMT and Truck Festivals. A version of "Please Don't" with Blossoms was released in July 2020; a music video was filmed at each members' house due to the COVID-19 pandemic. In 2023, the album was reissued as a two-CD set with B-sides, outtakes and acoustic versions.

== Critical reception ==
Professional ratings
Aggregate scores
Source	Rating
Metacritic	60/100
Review scores
Source	Rating
AllMusic	3/5 stars
Gigwise	6/10 stars
God Is in the TV	1/5
The Guardian	1/5 stars
NME	7/10
musicOMH	4/5 stars
The Observer	3/5 stars
Uncut	3/5 stars
Yahoo! Music	7/10 stars

St. Jude was met with generally favourable reviews from music critics. At Metacritic, the album received an average score of 60, based on seven reviews.

AllMusic reviewer Stewart Mason thought Fray was not a "distinctive frontman or as an instantly memorable songwriter, but the best parts of St. Jude are at least superior to, say, Menswear or Cast". He added that the "more measured material throws enough changeups to keep the album from getting tiring". Huw Jones of Gigwise said Street's production work aided the album's "extremely commercially viable" sound, as it "resonates with the warm recycled familiarity of so many bands that have gone before". He said it was "short lived enjoyment as opposed to repeated longevity". The staff at NME thought musical references to previous acts only accounted for half of the album's content, while the second half is "where ‘St Jude’ really begins to confound expectations and reveal a seldom-seen sensitivity". God Is in the TV writer Bill Cummings considered the band to a share a similar vein to Status Quo, in the way they are "musically tired, derivative and boring". The Guardian's Maddy Costa gave a similar sentiment, stating that the band were "troglodytes on the rampage; if the garage fuzz of Kings of the New Road is effective, it's only because it's so derivative". Yahoo! Music reviewer Jamie Gill was slightly more sympathetic, acknowledging that while it "may be occasionally derivative, but it's also solid, confident and, musically at least, rewarding".

musicOMH contributor Taras Binns felt Fray had "something quite constructive to say" unlike the band's contemporaries, as he is "capable of scribbling down some damn good, meaningful words". Mason praised Fray's "endearingly yobbish vocals and unabashed sentimental lyrical streak"; Jones highlighted Fray's "undoubtedly appealing" vocals, though noted that it was "by no means an exclusive sound", linking it to the band's Manchester contemporaries. Cummings felt that Fray lacked the "wit, sensitivity and duality" of singers such as John Cooper Clarke, Jarvis Cocker or Morrissey, as his "vocal tone is so flat and repetitive that you wonder how people could bear it live". He added that the lyrics "lack the wry eye of a [Alex] Turner or even his way with a melody". Costa noted that Fray was "aiming at a kind of sardonic wit," only to come across as "sneering, arrogant and aggressive" instead, backed by him "howling on the loud songs, whining on the quiet ones".

== Commercial performance and accolades ==
St. Jude originally peaked at number 4 on the UK Albums Chart, where it sold 105,000 copies by the time its follow-up Falcon was released in 2010. It eventually topped the charts upon its 2023 reissue, the band's first album to do so. It was certified gold in the UK by the British Phonographic Industry (BPI) in 2008 and platinum in 2023. As of November 2016, it has sold 166,150 copies in the UK. It also reached number three in Scotland. "What Took You So Long?" charted at number seven in Scotland and number 20 in the UK. "Not Nineteen Forever" charted at number ten in Scotland and number 19 in the UK, becoming their highest-charting song in that country. It was first certified silver in 2017 and went double platinum in 2024. "No You Didn't, No You Don't" charted at number six in Scotland and number 35 in the UK. In 2021, "Bide Your Time" and St. Jude Re:Wired were both certified silver by the BPI, followed by "Cavorting" in 2023.

In December 2008 St. Jude won the inaugural Guardian's First British Album Award, beating out albums by Glasvegas, Duffy, Adele, and Noah and the Whale. The award was voted for by members of the public and The Guardian journalists. St. Jude clinched a mammoth 53% of the public vote.

== Track listing ==
All tracks are written by Liam Fray.

No.	Title	Length
1.	"Aftershow"	2:32
2.	"Cavorting"	3:06
3.	"Bide Your Time"	3:20
4.	"What Took You So Long?"	3:39
5.	"Please Don't"	3:18
6.	"If It Wasn't for Me"	2:40
7.	"No You Didn't, No You Don't"	3:59
8.	"How Come"	2:50
9.	"Kings of the New Road"	2:53
10.	"Not Nineteen Forever"	4:04
11.	"Fallowfield Hillbilly"	3:04
12.	"Yesterday, Today & Probably Tomorrow"	3:13
Total length:		38:38

Special edition disc

1. "Cavorting" (Original Recording)
2. "No You Didn't, No You Don't" (Original Recording)
3. "Acrylic"
4. "Kimberley"
5. "An Ex Is an Ex for a Reason"
6. "Bide Your Time" (Acoustic)
7. "Acrylic" (Acoustic)
8. "What Took You So Long?" (Acoustic)
9. "Not Nineteen Forever" (Acoustic)

== Charts and certifications ==
=== Weekly charts ===
2008 chart performance for St. Jude
Chart (2008)	Peak position
Scottish Albums (Official Charts)	3
UK Albums (Official Charts)	4

2023 chart performance for St. Jude
Chart (2023)	Peak position
Scottish Albums (Official Charts)	1
UK Albums (Official Charts)	1

=== Certifications ===
Certifications for St. Jude
Region	Certification	Certified units/sales
United Kingdom (BPI)	Platinum	300,000^{‡}
^{‡} Sales+streaming figures based on certification alone.
