= Falcon (album) =

Studio album by the Courteeners
- Released: 22 February 2010
- Recorded: August 2009
- Studio: ICP, Brussels, Belgium
- Genre: Arena rock, indie rock
- Length: 49:20
- Label: A&M
- Producer: Ed Buller

The Courteeners chronology
St. Jude (2008)	Falcon (2010)	Anna (2013)

Singles from Falcon
- 1. "You Overdid It Doll" Released: 15 February 2010; 2. "Take Over The World" Released: 26 April 2010; 3. "Lullaby"/"Scratch Your Name Upon My Lips" Released: 6 December 2010

Falcon is the second studio album by English rock band the Courteeners. It was released through A&M Records on 22 February 2010. While touring the United States in 2009 as part of promotion for their debut studio album St. Jude (2008), the band wrote new material on their tour bus. In August 2009, the band recorded its follow-up with Ed Buller at ICP studios in Brussels, Belgium. Falcon has an arena and indie rock sound, influenced in part by the work of Elbow, and is slower-paced than their previous album.

Before the end of 2009, the Courteeners played two shows in the United Kingdom. "You Overdid It Doll" was released as the lead single from Falcon in February 2010, which was then promoted with a tour of the UK the following month. "Take Over the World" followed as the second single from the album in April 2010. Over the next few months, they played at various festivals, leading up to another UK tour in late 2010, with support from Miles Kane and I Am Kloot. "Lullaby" and "Scratch Your Name Upon My Lips" were released as a Double A-Side single in December 2010.

Falcon received generally favourable reviews from critics, many of whom commented on the shift in musical direction. The album reached number six in the UK, after selling 24,000 copies in the first week of its release. Alongside this, it also appeared at number seven in Scotland and number 52 in Ireland. "You Overdid It Doll" charted at number 24 in Scotland and number 28 in the UK, while "Take Over the World" peaked at number 114 in the UK. Falcon was certified gold in the UK by the British Phonographic Industry in 2014.

== Background and recording ==
The Courteeners released their debut studio album St. Jude in April 2008, peaking at number four in the UK Albums Chart. All of its singles – "What Took You So Long?", "Not Nineteen Forever" and "No You Didn't, No You Don't" – reached the top 40 in the United Kingdom, with "Not Nineteen Forever" peaking the highest at number 19. The band promoted the album with two tours of the UK, shortly after its release, and one near the end of 2008. They played two UK shows prior to supporting Morrissey on his tour of the United States in April and May 2009. During one of the UK shows, they debuted three new tracks, namely "Sycophant", "Tear Me Apart" and "Good Times Are Calling".

While touring the US, the Courteeners wrote new material on their tour bus with guitars, shakers and keyboards. By July 2009, they were also performing "Bojangles". For seven weeks from August 2009, the band recorded their follow-up at ICP studios in Brussels, Belgium. By this point, they had accumulated 26-to-27 songs for their next album. In between sessions, they performed at the Reading and Leeds Festivals. Ed Buller produced sessions, while Lee Slater acted as engineer. Michael Bauer mixed all of the recordings, bar "Take Over the World", which was done by Jeremy Wheatley.

== Composition and lyrics ==
Falcon is an arena rock and indie rock album that Fray said was partially influenced by the work of Elbow. musicOMH contributor Camilla Pia noted that the Oasis influence of their debut had "pretty much disappeared" with Falcon, though it was replaced with a "Glasvegas, U2 and most of all Elbow" sound. AllMusic reviewer Heather Phares said Buller "helped them slows things down and take them more seriously" as musicians. Drowned in Sound writer Aaron Lavery referred to it as a "slower, much more introspective prospect than its predecessor, with Fray’s lyrics softened by time spent on the road". Touring member Adam Payne contributed piano and keyboards throughout the album's songs.

The album starts with the string-enhanced "The Opener", which sees Fray discuss his hometown and his relationship with his girlfriend. "Take Over the World" straddles between the indie sound of the band's past work and balladry, evoking "Viva la Vida" (2008) by Coldplay during its chorus sections. "Cross My Heart & Hope to Fly" features staccato guitar parts in the vein of the xx. "You Overdid It Doll" recalled the upbeat rhythm of "Da Ya Think I'm Sexy?" (1978) by Rod Stewart and the overall funk sound of Reverend and the Makers. "Lullaby" is a 1980s-esque synth-pop song that is followed by "Good Times Are Calling", which has a Doves-esque structure and a start-stop chorus. "The Rest of the World Has Gone Home" deals with the theme of loneliness in the style of Babyshambles, while "Sycophant" is a rock song that touches on folk and psychedelia. The rock balladry of "Cameo Brooch" is followed by "Scratch Your Name Upon My Lips", a love song detailing a long-distance relationship that spans 6,000 miles, incorporating rhythms used by Franz Ferdinand. "Last of the Ladies" is a piano ballad, leading into the closing song "Will It Be This Way Forever", which has electronic influences and apes the work of Oasis.

== Release ==
"Cross My Heart & Hope to Fly" was made available as a free digital download from the band's website on 7 December 2009. A promotional seven-inch vinyl record was released featuring an alternate version of "Sycophant". The following day, Falcon was announced for release in two months' time. Following this, the band ended the year with two one-off gigs, one at Parr Hall in Warrington and the second at the Central Convention Complex in Manchester with support from Buzzcocks and the Whip. On 5 January 2010, the album's track listing was posted online. The music video for "You Overdid It Doll" was posted on YouTube on 4 February 2010. The song was released as the lead single from the album 11 days later; the CD edition included "I Never Wanted To". Two versions were released on seven-inch: the first with "Whites of Her Eyes", while the other featured "Social Fireworks" and a live version of "You Overdid It Doll". Shortly after this, the band played a small show as part of the NME Awards.

Falcon was released on 22 February 2010; a two-disc deluxe edition was also released, featuring "Revolver", "Bojangles", "You're the Man", "Meanwhile Back at the Ranch" and "Forget the Weight of the World". The Japanese version included "Meanwhile Back at the Ranch", "Revolver" and the non-album track "That Kiss" as bonus tracks. It was promoted with a tour of the UK in the following month and an appearance at a Teenage Cancer Trust benefit show. The music video for "Take Over the World" was posted on YouTube on 23 April 2010. The song was released as the album's second single on three days later. The CD version included "Piercing Blues", while the seven-inch vinyl edition featured "Why Do You Do It?" and a demo of "Take Over the World".

Between June and August 2010, the band performed at the Glastonbury, Isle of Wight, T in the Park, iTunes, Oxegen, Underage and V Festivals. In November 2010, the band played at The Big Reunion festival; the following month, they embarked on a short tour of the UK, with support from Miles Kane and I Am Kloot. The Electric Lick EP was released on 5 December 2010, consisting of two new songs "Three Months" and "Swear Down", a cover of "Zero" (2009) by the Yeah Yeah Yeahs, in addition to "Lullaby" and "Scratch Your Name Upon My Lips"; the ten-inch vinyl edition included . The following day, "Lullaby" and "Scratch Your Name Upon My Lips" were released as a double A-side single. The band released their first video album, titled Live at Manchester MEN Arena, in December 2011, which had been filmed at the Manchester arena in December 2010. Falcon was re-pressed on vinyl in 2019 as part of that year's Record Store Day.

== Reception ==
Professional ratings
Aggregate scores
Source	Rating
AnyDecentMusic?	5.3/10
Metacritic	63/100
Review scores
Source	Rating
AllMusic	2.5/5 stars
Drowned in Sound	4/10
London Evening Standard	4/5 stars
The Guardian	2/5 stars
Mojo	4/5 stars
musicOMH	2/5 stars
NME	8/10 stars
Q	4/5 stars
Yahoo! Music	5/10 stars

Falcon was met with generally favourable reviews from music critics. At Metacritic, the album received an average score of 63, based on nine reviews. AnyDecentMusic? gave it an average score of 5.3, based on 14 reviews.

Phares theorised the shift in sound "comes from a need for the band to prove that there’s more to their sound than breathless rock and sneering lyrics". Though she added that "too much soul-baring is as bad as too many putdowns; maybe next time the band will find some balance between the extremes of this album" and the previous. Chris Roberts of BBC Music felt there was "enough musical flourishes and pining ballads to earn the band the Elbow comparisons they blatantly desire". Pia saw it as a "marked improvement" from their debut, praising the "newly discovered emotional depth to Fray's songwriting", while lambasting the band for not pushing themselves beyond their influences. Digital Spy writer Alex Fletcher, on the other hand, stated that the band had "too much chug in their guitars and anthemic ambition to be billed as copyists of Elbow's more intricate and delicate stylings".

Laver criticized the band for offering "nothing more than backing for the entirety of the record," which he felt ran at a "rather pedestrian pace". The Guardian editor Will Dean wrote that "most things fall between the cracks – either sub-Guy Garvey/Conor Oberst ballads [...] you just suspect the Courteeners could do better". Yahoo! Music reviewer Julian Marszalek wrote that "what hampers" the album was the "small and obvious palette that they paint from - a soupcon of Oasis here, a dab of Elbow there and some typical indie garnishes all over the place". Ally Carnwath of The Observer echoed a similar sentiment, stating that "[t]here's a development of sorts here but it extends only to leavening brash indie swagger with bolted-on string sections and heart-on-sleeve anthemics". The Line of Best Fit writer Erik Thompson thought it "relies too heavily on repetitive, unimaginative choruses and very little on authenticity and heart".

Falcon peaked at number six in the UK Album Charts, selling 24,000 copies in its first week of release. It was certified silver and gold in the UK by the British Phonographic Industry (BPI) in 2013 and 2014, respectively. The album also reached number seven in Scotland and number 52 in Ireland. "You Overdid It Doll" charted at number 24 in Scotland and number 28 in the UK. "Take Over the World" charted at number 114 in the UK.

== Track listing ==
All lyrics and music by Liam Fray.

No.	Title	Length
1.	"The Opener"	5:19
2.	"Take Over the World"	3:44
3.	"Cross My Heart & Hope to Fly"	4:01
4.	"You Overdid It Doll"	4:09
5.	"Lullaby"	4:09
6.	"Good Times Are Calling"	3:15
7.	"The Rest of the World Has Gone Home"	3:27
8.	"Sycophant"	4:31
9.	"Cameo Brooch"	4:20
10.	"Scratch Your Name Upon My Lips"	4:29
11.	"Last of the Ladies"	3:25
12.	"Will It Be This Way Forever?"	4:39
Total length:		49:20

== Personnel ==
Personnel per booklet.

The Courteeners

- Liam Fray – vocals, guitars
- Daniel Moores – guitars
- Mark Cuppello – bass guitars
- Michael Campbell – drums

Additional musicians

- Adam Payne – piano, keys

Production and design

- Ed Buller – producer
- Lee Slater – engineer
- Michael Bauer – mixing (except track 2)
- Jeremy Wheatley – mixing (track 2)
- Village Green – design, images

== Charts and certifications ==
=== Weekly charts ===
Chart performance for Falcon
Chart (2010)	Peak position
Irish Albums (IRMA)	52
Scottish Albums (OCC)	7
UK Albums (OCC)	6

=== Certifications ===
Certifications for Falcon
Region	Certification	Certified units/sales
United Kingdom (BPI)	Gold	100,000^{*}
^{*} Sales figures based on certification alone.
