= List of UK Dance Albums Chart number ones of 2024 =

These are the Official Charts Company's UK Dance Albums Chart number ones of 2024. The chart week runs from Friday to Thursday with the chart-date given as the following Thursday.

== Chart history ==
Issue date	Album	Artist(s)	Record label	Ref.
4 January	The Annual 2024	Various Artists	Ministry Of Sound	
11 January	The Annual 2024	Various Artists	Ministry Of Sound	
18 January	The Very Best of Ultra-Sonic	Ultra-Sonic	Central Station	
25 January	The Annual 2024	Various Artists	Ministry of Sound	
1 February	The Annual 2024	Various Artists	Ministry of Sound	
8 February	The Annual 2024	Various Artists	Ministry of Sound	
15 February	We Love Your Ears - Optimo 25 - P1	Various Artists	Above Board Projects	
22 February	The Annual 2024	Various Artists	Ministry of Sound	
29 February	The Annual 2024	Various Artists	Ministry of Sound	
7 March	The Annual 2024	Various Artists	Ministry of Sound	
14 March	Dostrotime	Squarepusher	Warp	
21 March	The Annual 2024	Various Artists	Ministry of Sound	
28 March	Three	Four Tet	Text	
4 April	Tides	Hybrid Minds	Hybrid Music	
11 April	Dave Pearce Dance Anthems	Various Artists	New State	
18 April	Dave Pearce Trance Anthems	Various Artists	New State	
25 April	Silence is Loud	Nia Archives	Island	
2 May	Orbital	Orbital	FFRR	
9 May	Hyperdrama	Justice	Because Music	
16 May	Best Workout 2024	Workout Remix Factory	Jol	
23 May	The Annual 2024	Various Artists	Ministry Of Sound	
30 May	The Annual 2024	Various Artists	Ministry Of Sound	
6 June	Sun & Smoke	Theef	A Strangely Isolated Place	
13 June	Believe Me Now?	Becky Hill	Polydor	
20 June	Brat	Charli XCX	Atlantic	
27 June	Family Only	Bru-C	0207 Def Jam	
4 July	Kygo	Kygo	Columbia/Kygo	
11 July	Sound of Silver	LCD Soundsystem	DFA/EMI	
18 July	II	Kiasmos	Erased Tapes	
25 July	Walking on a Dream	Empire of the Sun	Capitol	
1 August	Reverie	Gorgon City	Positiva	
8 August	Brat	Charli XCX	Atlantic	
15 August	Pacha - Ibiza Classics	Various Artists	New State	
22 August	96 Months	Calvin Harris	Columbia	
29 August	96 Months	Calvin Harris	Columbia	
5 September	Dave Pearce Dance Anthems	Various Artists	New State	
12 September	Everything Squared	Seefeel	Warp	
19 September	Ten Days	Fred Again	Atlantic	
26 September	Cascade	Floating Points	Ninja Tune	
3 October	In Waves	Jamie xx	Young	
10 October	In Waves	Jamie xx	Young	
17 October	Selected Ambient Works Vol. II	Aphex Twin	Warp	
24 October	Brat	Charli XCX	Atlantic	
31 October	3AM (La La La)	Confidence Man	I Oh You	
7 November	Strawberry Hotel	Underworld	Smith Hyde	
14 November	Strawberry Hotel	Underworld	Smith Hyde	
21 November	A Beginner's Guide	Orbital	London	
28 November	Dave Pearce Trance Anthems	Various Artists	New State	
5 December	The Annual 2025	Various Artists	Ministry Of Sound	
12 December	Any Signs of Love	Crazy P	Walk Don't Run	
19 December	Rtrn II Jungle	Chase & Status	Virgin	
26 December	Brat	Charli XCX	Atlantic	

== See also ==
- List of UK Albums Chart number ones of 2024
- List of UK Dance Singles Chart number ones of 2024
- List of UK Album Downloads Chart number ones of 2024
- List of UK Independent Albums Chart number ones of 2024
- List of UK R&B Albums Chart number ones of 2024
- List of UK Rock & Metal Albums Chart number ones of 2024
- List of UK Compilation Chart number ones of the 2020s
