= List of UK Independent Albums Chart number ones of 2024 =

These are the Official Charts Company's UK Independent Albums Chart number ones of 2024.

== Chart history ==
Issue date	Album	Artist(s)	Record label	Ref.
5 January	My 21st Century Blues	Raye	Human Re Sources	
12 January ^{[a]}	A Matter of Time	Shed Seven	Cooking Vinyl	
19 January	Pick-Up Full of Pink Carnations	The Vaccines	Super Easy	
26 January	Hell, Fire and Damnation	Saxon	Militia Guard	
2 February	Ballad of a Bystander	The Reytons	The Reytons	
9 February	Natural Magick	Kula Shaker	Strange Folk	
16 February	Don't Take It Personal	Dizzee Rascal	Big Dirte 3	
23 February ^{[a]}	Tangk	Idles	Partisan Records	
1 March	Millennials	The Snuts	Happy Artist	
8 March	The Mandrake Project	Bruce Dickinson	BMG	
15 March	Bleachers	Bleachers	Dirty Hit	
22 March	My 21st Century Blues	Raye	Human Re Sources	
29 March	Glasgow Eyes	The Jesus and Mary Chain	Fuzz Club	
5 April	Interplay	Ride	Wichita	
12 April	I Wonder if the World Knows	K'S	LAB	
19 April	Halo Effect	Kris Barras Band	Earache	
26 April	Orbital	Orbital	FFRR	
3 May	The Big Decider	The Zutons	Icepop	
10 May	Undefeated	Frank Turner	Xtra Mile	
17 May	A Place in Your Heart	Gabrielle	BMG	
24 May	Lives Outgrown	Beth Gibbons	Domino	
31 May	TRU	Meekz	Neighbourhood	
7 June	Golden Hour: Part.1	Ateez	KQ Entertainment	
14 June	A Trip a Stumble a Fall Down on Your Knees	Seasick Steve	So Recordings	
21 June	Midnight Butterflies	Sea Girls	ALT	
28 June	9 Sad Symphonies	Kate Nash	Kill Rock Stars	
5 July	Theatre of the Absurd Presents C'est la Vie	Madness	BMG	
12 July	Love Your Neighbour	The Rifles	Cooking Vinyl	
19 July	L.A. Times	Travis	BMG	
26 July	Heavy Jelly	Soft Play	BMG	
2 August	=1	Deep Purple	EarMUSIC	
9 August	No Name	Jack White	Third Man	
16 August ^{[a]}	This Is How Tomorrow Moves	Beabadoobee	Dirty Hit	
23 August	Satellites	The Script	BMG	
30 August	Romance	Fontaines D.C.	XL	
6 September	Wild God	Nick Cave and the Bad Seeds	PIAS	
13 September	Woof.	Fat Dog	Domino	
20 September	My Method Actor	Nilüfer Yanya	Ninja Tune	
27 September	Gary	Blossoms	Odd SK Recordings	
4 October ^{[a]}	Liquid Gold	Shed Seven	Cooking Vinyl	
11 October	The Last Flight	Public Service Broadcasting	SO Recordings	
18 October	Day By Day	Skinny Living	Skinny Living	
25 October ^{[a]}	Tension II	Kylie Minogue	BMG	
1 November	Pink Cactus Café	Courteeners	Ignition	
8 November	All Pleasure	Thus Love	Captured Tracks	
15 November ^{[a]}	Together at Home	Michael Ball and Alfie Boe	BMG	
22 November	Together at Home	Michael Ball and Alfie Boe	BMG	
29 November	Mahashmashana	Father John Misty	Bella Union	
6 December	Together at Home	Michael Ball and Alfie Boe	BMG	
13 December	Together at Home	Michael Ball and Alfie Boe	BMG	
20 December	Clifton Park	The Reytons	The Reytons	
27 December	Romance	Fontaines D.C.	XL	

== Notes ==
- ^{a} – The single was simultaneously number-one on the Album chart.
- ^{b} - The artist was simultaneously number one on the Independent Singles Chart.
