= List of UK Independent Singles Chart number ones of 2024 =

These are the Official Charts Company's UK Independent Singles Chart number-one singles of 2024.

== Chart history ==
Chart date (week ending)	Song	Artist(s)	Record label	References
4 January	"Merry Xmas Everybody"	Slade	BMG	
11 January	"My Love Mine All Mine"	Mitski	Dead Oceans	
18 January	"My Love Mine All Mine"	Mitski	Dead Oceans	
25 January	"My Love Mine All Mine"	Mitski	Dead Oceans	
1 February	"My Love Mine All Mine"	Mitski	Dead Oceans	
8 February	"Praise Jah in the Moonlight"	YG Marley	YG Marley	
15 February	"Praise Jah in the Moonlight"	YG Marley	YG Marley	
22 February	"Praise Jah in the Moonlight"	YG Marley	YG Marley	
29 February	"Praise Jah in the Moonlight"	YG Marley	YG Marley	
7 March	"End of Beginning"	Djo	Djo	
14 March	"End of Beginning"	Djo	Djo	
21 March	"End of Beginning"	Djo	Djo	
28 March	"End of Beginning"	Djo	Djo	
4 April	"End of Beginning"	Djo	Djo	
11 April	"End of Beginning"	Djo	Djo	
18 April	"End of Beginning"	Djo	Djo	
25 April	"End of Beginning"	Djo	Djo	
2 May	"End of Beginning"	Djo	Djo	
9 May	"A Bar Song (Tipsy)"	Shaboozey	American Dogwood/Empire	
16 May	"A Bar Song (Tipsy)"	Shaboozey	American Dogwood/Empire	
23 May	"Million Dollar Baby"	Tommy Richman	ISO Supremacy/Pulse	
30 May	"A Bar Song (Tipsy)"	Shaboozey	American Dogwood/Empire	
6 June	"A Bar Song (Tipsy)"	Shaboozey	American Dogwood/Empire	
13 June	"A Bar Song (Tipsy)"	Shaboozey	American Dogwood/Empire	
20 June	"A Bar Song (Tipsy)"	Shaboozey	American Dogwood/Empire	
27 June	"A Bar Song (Tipsy)"	Shaboozey	American Dogwood/Empire	
4 July	"A Bar Song (Tipsy)"	Shaboozey	American Dogwood/Empire	
11 July	"A Bar Song (Tipsy)"	Shaboozey	American Dogwood/Empire	
18 July	"A Bar Song (Tipsy)"	Shaboozey	American Dogwood/Empire	
25 July	"A Bar Song (Tipsy)"	Shaboozey	American Dogwood/Empire	
1 August	"A Bar Song (Tipsy)"	Shaboozey	American Dogwood/Empire	
8 August	"A Bar Song (Tipsy)"	Shaboozey	American Dogwood/Empire	
15 August	"A Bar Song (Tipsy)"	Shaboozey	American Dogwood/Empire	
22 August	"A Bar Song (Tipsy)"	Shaboozey	American Dogwood/Empire	
29 August	"A Bar Song (Tipsy)"	Shaboozey	American Dogwood/Empire	
5 September	"A Bar Song (Tipsy)"	Shaboozey	American Dogwood/Empire	
12 September	"A Bar Song (Tipsy)"	Shaboozey	American Dogwood/Empire	
19 September	"A Bar Song (Tipsy)"	Shaboozey	American Dogwood/Empire	
26 September	"A Bar Song (Tipsy)"	Shaboozey	American Dogwood/Empire	
3 October	"A Bar Song (Tipsy)"	Shaboozey	American Dogwood/Empire	
10 October	"A Bar Song (Tipsy)"	Shaboozey	American Dogwood/Empire	
17 October	"A Bar Song (Tipsy)"	Shaboozey	American Dogwood/Empire	
24 October	"Somedays"	Sonny Fodera, Jazzy and D.O.D.	Solotoko	
31 October	"Somedays"	Sonny Fodera, Jazzy and D.O.D.	Solotoko	
7 November	"Somedays"	Sonny Fodera, Jazzy and D.O.D.	Solotoko	
14 November	"A Bar Song (Tipsy)"	Shaboozey	American Dogwood/Empire	
21 November	"A Bar Song (Tipsy)"	Shaboozey	American Dogwood/Empire	
28 November	"A Bar Song (Tipsy)"	Shaboozey	American Dogwood/Empire	
5 December	"A Bar Song (Tipsy)"	Shaboozey	American Dogwood/Empire	
12 December	"Merry Xmas Everybody"	Slade	BMG	
19 December	"Merry Xmas Everybody"	Slade	BMG	
26 December	"Merry Xmas Everybody"	Slade	BMG	

== Notes ==
- ^{a} – The single was simultaneously number-one on the singles chart.
- ^{b} - The artist was simultaneously number one on the Independent Albums Chart.

== Number-one Indie artists ==
Position	Artist	Weeks at number one
1	Shaboozey	27
2	Djo	9
3	Mitski	4
3	YG Marley	4
3	Slade	4
4	Sonny Fodera	3
5	Tommy Richman	1

== See also ==
- List of UK Dance Singles Chart number ones of 2024
- List of UK R&B Singles Chart number ones of 2024
- List of UK Rock & Metal Singles Chart number ones of 2024
- List of UK Independent Albums Chart number ones of 2024
