= Victorious Festival =

Music festival in Portsmouth, United Kingdom

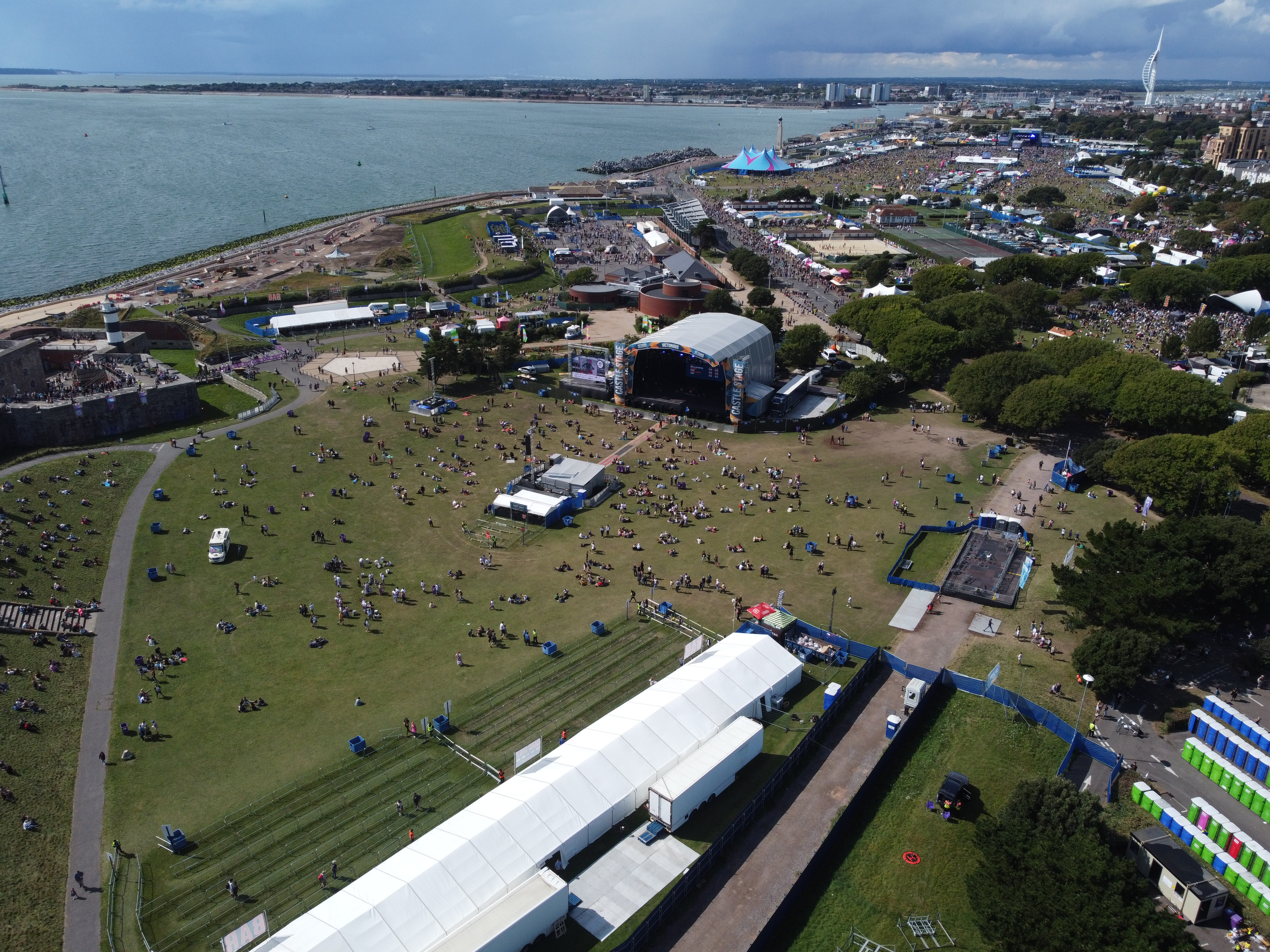
- Castle Stage in 2023
- Genre: Rock; pop
- Frequency: Annually
- Venue: Portsmouth Historic Dockyard (2012–2013), Southsea Seafront (2014–present)
- Country: England
- Years active: 2012 – present
- Capacity: 80,000
- Website: victoriousfestival.co.uk

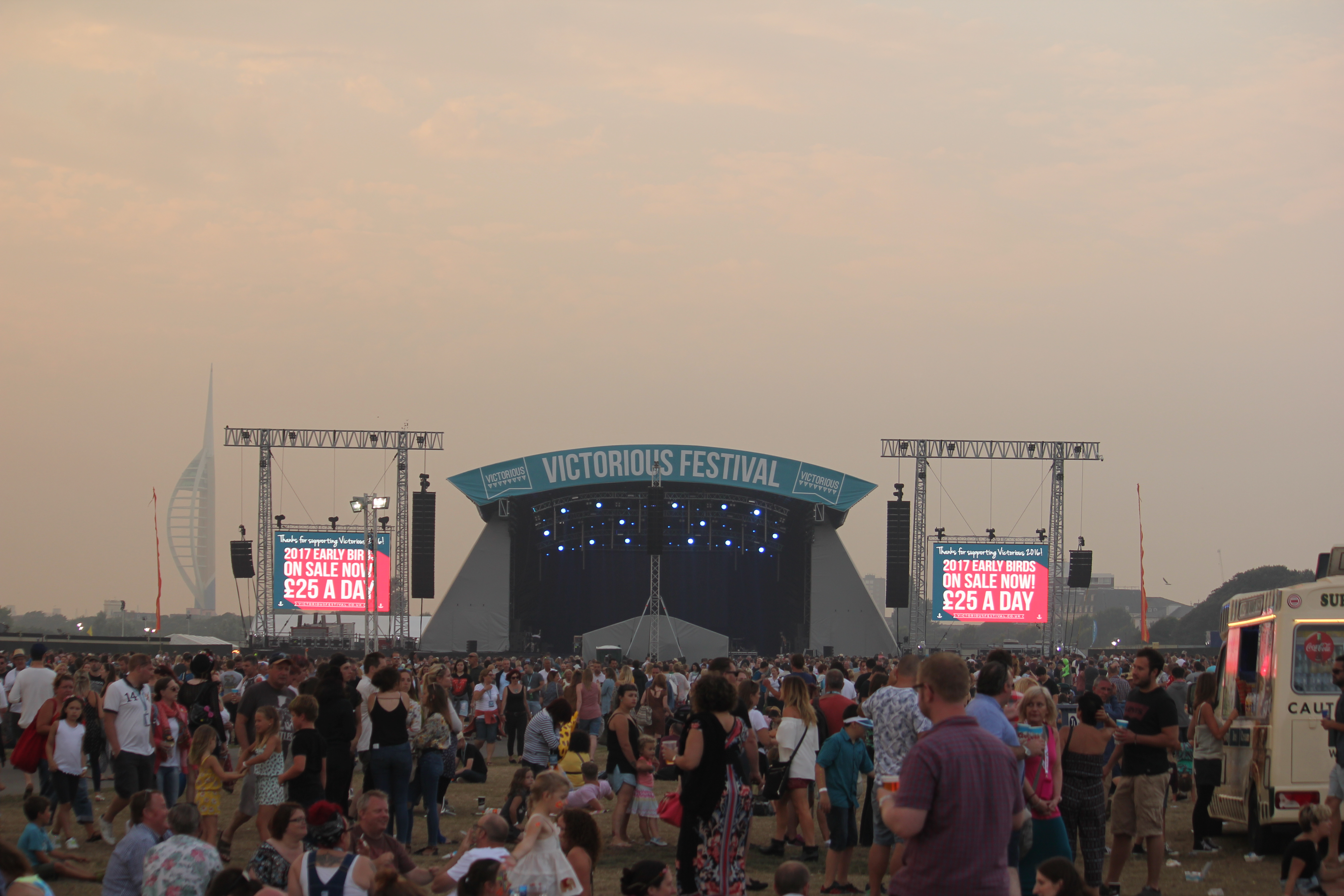
Common stage at Victorious Festival, 2016

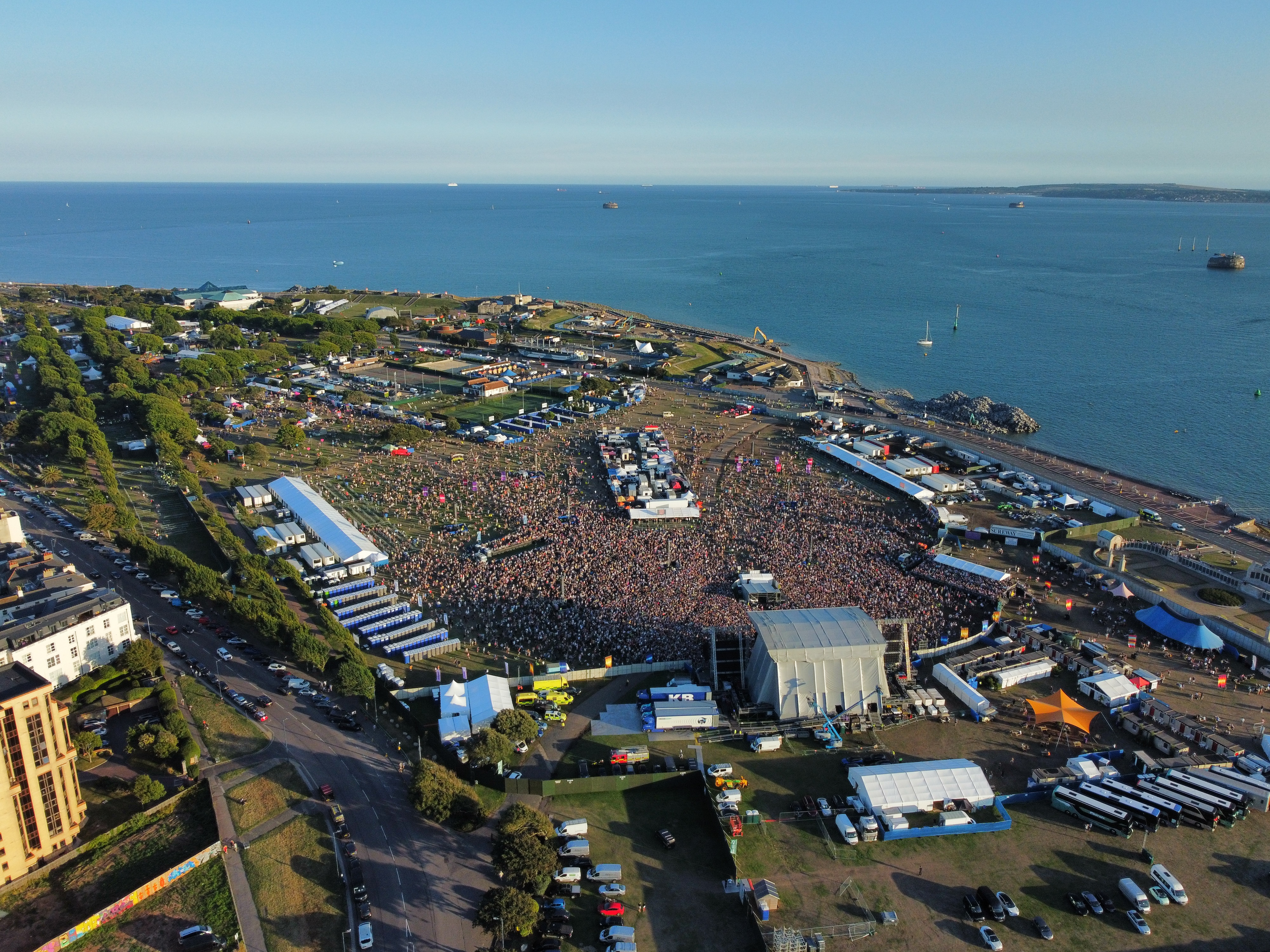
Aerial view of the Common Stage, 2022

Victorious Festival is a three-day music festival held in Portsmouth, United Kingdom. It was founded in 2012.

== History ==
In its first year, the festival was named the Victorious Vintage Festival. The first official Victorious Festival was 2013. The festival was held in Portsmouth Historic Dockyard, before moving to Southsea Seafront in 2014.

Southsea Castle, Southsea Skatepark, the D-Day Museum and other local attractions are within the festival boundaries and are only accessible to ticket holders during that time.

Victorious has a charitable arm called Victorious in the Community. The aim of this arm is give back to Portsmouth by supporting local charities and good causes in the area. Part of the proceeds from ticket sales is given to the local D-Day Museum.

The 2017 festival extended the duration to include a first night party headlined by Madness. Camping facilities were provided for the 2017 festival at a site at Farlington playing fields after camping on Southsea Common was ruled out. Portsmouth City Council has agreed to allow the festival until 2027 and hoped that the festival would bring over £5.8m a year for the local economy. In 2017, a majority stake in the festival was sold to Global Entertainment with the hope that bigger acts might be secured in future. Superstruct Entertainment, the live entertainment platform backed by Providence Equity Partners, part-owns the festival after it entered definitive agreement for the acquisition of several live music and entertainment festivals from Global Media & Entertainment in April 2019. The festival is still run and operated by the same local team of people that founded it. The daily capacity of the 2019 festival was 65,000.

The 2020 edition of the festival was cancelled in May 2020 due to the COVID-19 pandemic, but returned the following year.

The festival has a significant economic impact on Portsmouth each year. In 2022 the impact was measured at £15m and in 2023 it was estimated to be "around £20m" and is a huge boost to tourism in Portsmouth.

The Portsmouth News reported that nearly 80,000 people attended the festival each day in 2024.

In 2024, the festival won Major Festival of the Year in the UK Live Awards.

The 2026 festival took place from 28 to 30 August at Southsea Common. Headliners included Richard Ashcroft, The Black Keys and Kasabian. More than 150,000 people attended over the three days.

== Controversy ==
In 2025, Irish band The Mary Wallopers had their set on the Friday cut as they displayed a Palestinian flag on stage. As a result, several other bands including The Last Dinner Party, The Academic and Cliffords cancelled their sets in protest. The event organisers initially stated that the decision to end their set was made due to a "discriminatory" chant rather than the display of the flag, but later retracted this, apologised to the band and pledged to make a "substantial donation" to humanitarian relief efforts in Gaza.

== Lineups ==
Edition	Year	Attendance	Headliners	Notable acts
1	2012	35,000	Dodgy, The Lightning Seeds, Mark Morriss, Bog Rolling Stones	Beth Oliver Band, England Road, The Ricardos, Freestyle Funk Collective
2	2013	45,000	Level 42, The Feeling, Maxïmo Park, Katy B	Fenech-Soler, The Joy Formidable, Charlotte Church, Totally Enormous Extinct Dinosaurs, DJ Yoda, Mike Skinner
3	2014	80,000	Dizzee Rascal, Seasick Steve, Tom Odell, Ocean Colour Scene	Razorlight, Naughty Boy, British Sea Power, Scouting for Girls, Sophie Ellis-Bextor, Shed Seven, Menswear, The Pigeon Detectives, Public Service Broadcasting, John Bramwell, Slow Club
4	2015	100,000	Basement Jaxx, Ray Davies, Flaming Lips, Tinie Tempah	The Darkness, Texas, We Are Scientists, The Magic Numbers, Primal Scream, The Fratellis, Ella Eyre, Super Furry Animals, Johnny Marr
5	2016	120,000	Manic Street Preachers, High Flying Birds, Annie Mac, Mark Ronson	Travis, The Coral, Levellers, Boomtown Rats, Echo and the Bunnymen, Editors, Wretch 32, DMA's, The Selecter, Public Service Broadcasting, Milky Chance, Space, Will Young, Slow Readers Club, The Horrors, Raleigh Ritchie, Izzy Bizu, Teleman, Wolfmother, Ash, Jack Savoretti, Emmy The Great, Beans on Toast, Natty, Liam Bailey
6	2017	120,000 +	Madness, Stereophonics, Elbow, The Charlatans, Rita Ora, Olly Murs	Frank Turner, Jake Bugg, Franz Ferdinand, The Dandy Warhols, The Craig Charles Funk & Soul Club, Slaves, Feeder, Frightened Rabbit, KT Tunstall, Sundara Karma, Raye, Lady Leshurr, Band of Skulls, Deaf Havana, Pete Doherty, Temples, Field Music, British Sea Power, Shy FX, Turin Brakes, Sikth, Echobelly
7	2018		The Libertines, Kaiser Chiefs, Paul Weller, Paloma Faith, Brian Wilson, The Prodigy, Years & Years, Friendly Fires	The Lightning Seeds, Happy Mondays Shed Seven, Everything Everything, Billy Bragg, Gaz Coombes, The Pigeon Detectives, Sleeper, Gabrielle Aplin, Coasts, Cabbage, Duke Special, Barry Hyde, Example + DJ Wire, Embrace, Gomez, The Amazons, Reverend and The Makers, The Bluetones, Tom Walker, Lucy Spraggan, Gengahr, Chris Helme
8	2019		Two Door Cinema Club, The Specials, Rudimental, Bloc Party, New Order, Clean Bandit	Doves, The Zutons, Dodgy, James Bay, Ocean Colour Scene, The Hives, Fun Lovin' Criminals, Professor Green, Lewis Capaldi, The Rifles, Badly Drawn Boy, The Vaccines, Razorlight, Ziggy Marley, Basement Jaxx, Starsailor, Ash, The Futureheads
	2020 (Cancelled due to COVID-19 pandemic)		Ian Brown, The Streets, Manic Street Preachers, Royal Blood, Nile Rodgers & Chic	The Kooks, Circa Waves, Peter Hook and The Light, Terrorvision, Rag'n'Bone Man, Craig David, Blossoms, The Fratellis, Feeder, La Roux, Twin Atlantic, Morcheeba, Reef, Stereo MC's, Bombay Bicycle Club, Johnny Marr, Miles Kane, DJ Fresh, Mystery Jets, Eve, Cast, Glasvegas, Jaguar Skills
9	2021	73,220	Madness, The Streets, Manic Street Preachers, Royal Blood, Nile Rodgers & Chic	The Kooks, Feeder, Peter Hook and The Light, Terrorvision, Lottery Winners, Rag'n'Bone Man, Craig David, Blossoms, The Fratellis, Frank Turner, Morcheeba, Reef, The Lathums, Stereo MC's, Black Honey, Seth Lakeman, Porridge Radio, Bad Sounds, Bloxx, The Mysterines, Wild Front, Rews, Lauran Hibberd, Emily Burns, Andrew Cushin, Me and The Moon, Supergrass, Fontaines D.C., Annie Mac, Miles Kane, Ella Eyre, Melanie C, Jade Bird, Clean Bandit, Cast, Glasvegas, The Snuts, Jaguar Skills, Pigs Pigs Pigs Pigs Pigs Pigs Pigs, Beans on Toast, Kawala, Lily Moore, Billie Marten, Fenne Lily, Liz Lawrence, The Clockworks, Louis Berry, Nia Wyn, Roxanne De Bastion
10	2022		Stereophonics, Paolo Nutini, Bastille, Sam Fender	James, Nothing But Thieves, The Wombats, Declan McKenna, Becky Hill, Sugababes, Example (musician), Sophie Ellis-Bextor, Self Esteem, We Are Scientists, Little Man Tate, Sam Ryder, Baby Queen, Coach Party, WorryWorry
11	2023		Jamiroquai, Kasabian, Mumford & Sons	Alt-J, Raye, Jake Bugg, Katy B, Mae Muller, The View, Newton Faulkner, Kaiser Chiefs, Pale Waves, Kate Nash, Ellie Goulding, Ben Howard, Sigrid, The Vaccines
12	2024		Fatboy Slim, Snow Patrol, Jamie T, Biffy Clyro	Courteeners, Pixies, Becky Hill, Wet Leg, IDLES, Louis Tomlinson, Jess Glynne, The Snuts, The Lathums, Holly Humberstone, Arlo Parks, SOFT PLAY, Yard Act, The Snuts, Maxïmo Park, The Lottery Winners, Peace, The Lightning Seeds, The Amazons, CMAT, Natasha Bedingfield, The Pigeon Detectives, The Murder Capital, Katie Gregson-MacLeod, The Royston Club, Do Nothing, Echobelly, Tors, Cameron Hayes, Crystal Tides, Red Rum Club, Brooke Combe, Personal Trainer
13	2025		Queens of the Stone Age, Vampire Weekend, Kings of Leon	Kaiser Chiefs (replaced Michael Kiwanuka after withdrawing), Madness, Nelly Furtado, The Last Dinner Party, Travis, Bloc Party, Gabrielle, The Reytons, Wunderhorse, The Mary Wallopers, Everything Everything, Shed Seven, Caity Baser, Public Service Broadcasting, The Zutons, Reverend and the Makers, The Charlatans, Rizzle Kicks, Jamie Webster, The K's, Sprints, Lime Garden, October Drift, Circa Waves, Scouting for Girls, The Academic, FEET, The Manatees, The Rosadocs, Bradley Simpson, Starsailor, The Waeve, overpass, Polly Money, Harvey Jay Dodgson
