= Are You Satisfied? =

Studio album by Slaves
- Released: 1 June 2015
- Genre: Punk rock
- Length: 37:37
- Label: Virgin EMI Records
- Producer: Jolyon Thomas

Slaves chronology
Sugar Coated Bitter Truth (2012)	Are You Satisfied? (2015)	Take Control (2016)

Singles from Are You Satisfied?
- 1. "Hey" Released: 18 August 2014; 2. "The Hunter" Released: 17 November 2014; 3. "Feed The Mantaray" Released: 23 March 2015; 4. "Cheer Up London" Released: 1 June 2015; 5. "Sockets" Released: 4 September 2015

Are You Satisfied? is the debut album of English punk duo Slaves. It was released on 1 June 2015. It reached number 8 in its first week on the UK Albums Chart. The album was nominated for the 2015 Mercury Music Prize. A deluxe edition was released on 13 November 2015 which featured their single "Where's Your Car Debbie" and one of its B-sides, 3 songs from their "Sugar Coated Bitter Truth" EP, 2 tracks from BBC Radio 1's Live Lounge and other new songs.

== Reception ==
Professional ratings
Aggregate scores
Source	Rating
Metacritic	71/100
Review scores
Source	Rating
Clash	7/10
DIY	3/5 stars
Drowned in Sound	4/10
The Guardian	3/5 stars
NME	8/10

The album received positive reviews from critics, racking up an average rating of 71/00 on Metacritic. Clash Music reviewed their debut album, calling it a "solid debut" and rating it seven out of ten, however, Crack placed the album at number 1 in their list of the worst albums of 2015, and described the duo as "papier-mache punks with their mockney lip-flapping, fag-paper-thin-sentiment, derivative riffs, embarrassingly prescriptive pseudo-politics and sixth form poetry."

== Track listing ==
Are You Satisfied? track listing
No.	Title	Length
1.	"The Hunter"	3:00
2.	"Cheer Up London"	2:33
3.	"Sockets"	3:26
4.	"Despair and Traffic"	2:18
5.	"Do Something"	2:27
6.	"Are You Satisfied?"	1:30
7.	"Wow!!! 7AM"	3:42
8.	"Hey"	2:25
9.	"Live Like an Animal"	3:35
10.	"Ninety Nine"	3:15
11.	"She Wants Me Now"	2:31
12.	"Feed the Mantaray"	2:54
13.	"Sugar Coated Bitter Truth"	4:01
Total length:		37:37

Deluxe edition
No.	Title	Length
14.	"Where's Your Car Debbie?"	2:23
15.	"Beauty Quest"	3:49
16.	"White Knuckle Ride"	3:36
17.	"Shutdown (BBC Radio 1 Live Lounge)"	3:00
18.	"Daft Punk Is Playing at My House (BBC Radio 1 Live Lounge)"	2:57
19.	"Why Would You?"	1:45
20.	"OK"	2:21
21.	"I Shine My Shoes with a Dirty Vest"	1:21
22.	"Tricky (Demo)"	3:43
Total length:		62:02

== Personnel ==
Adapted from the albums liner notes.

- Isaac Holman – vocals, drums; piano on "Are You Satisfied?"
- Laurie Vincent – guitar, synths, backing vocals
- Jolyon Thomas – synths, additional percussion

== Charts ==
Chart (2015)	Peak position
UK Albums (OCC)	8
