= Heavy Jelly (disambiguation) =

Heavy Jelly is a 2024 album by Soft Play.

Heavy Jelly may also refer to:

- Heavy Jelly, band renamed from Skip Bifferty (1969)
- Heavy Jelly, British band that released an eponymous album in 1970, see Jackie Lomax
- Heavy Jelly, band created by Simon Napier-Bell whose records were only issued in the United States
