= List of UK Rock & Metal Albums Chart number ones of 2024 =

The UK Rock & Metal Albums Chart is a record chart which ranks the best-selling rock and heavy metal albums in the United Kingdom. Compiled and published by the Official Charts Company, the data is based on each album's weekly physical sales and digital downloads.

== Chart history ==
Issue date	Album	Artist(s)	Record label(s)	Ref.
5 January	The Dark Side of the Moon	Pink Floyd	Rhino	
12 January	Paramore	Paramore	Atlantic/Fueled By Ramen	
19 January	Here Comes the Rain	Magnum	Steamhammer	
26 January	Saviors	Green Day	Reprise	
2 February	Unbroken	New Model Army	EarMUSIC	
9 February	Bed of Nails	Florence Black	Florence Black	
16 February	It Leads to This	The Pineapple Thief	Kscope	
23 February	The Circus and the Nightwhale	Steve Hackett	Inside Out	
1 March	Live in Paris 1973	Can	Mute	
8 March	The Mandrake Project	Bruce Dickinson	BMG	
15 March	Invincible Shield	Judas Priest	Columbia	
22 March	Back in Black	AC/DC	Atlantic	
29 March	Jar of Flies	Alice in Chains	Columbia	
5 April	Heaven :x: Hell	Sum 41	Rise	
12 April	Robert Johnson's Tombstone	Thunder	STC	
19 April	Halo Effect	Kris Barras Band	Earache	
26 April	Dark Matter	Pearl Jam	EMI	
3 May	Dark Matter	Pearl Jam	EMI	
10 May	What Doesn't Kill You	Marisa and the Moths	Tonesick	
17 May	You Won't Go Before You're Supposed To	Knocked Loose	Pure Noise	
24 May	From Hell I Rise	Kerry King	Reigning Phoenix Music	
31 May	Post Human: Nex Gen	Bring Me the Horizon	RCA	
7 June	Anno Domini 1989–1995	Black Sabbath	BMG	
14 June	The Dark Side of the Moon	Pink Floyd	Rhino	
21 June	V	Black Country Communion	Mascot	
28 June	I Want to Disappear	The Story So Far	Pure Noise	
5 July	Keep Me Fed	The Warning	EMI	
12 July	Dancing on the Frontline	Enter Shikari	SO Recordings	
19 July	The Dark Side of the Moon	Pink Floyd	Rhino	
26 July	Heavy Jelly	Soft Play	BMG	
2 August	Rite Here Rite Now	Ghost	Loma Vista	
9 August	Rite Here Rite Now	Ghost	Loma Vista	
16 August	The Dark Side of the Moon	Pink Floyd	Rhino	
23 August	Where the Colours Meet	Scarlet Rebels	Earache Records	
30 August	This World Fucking Sucks	Cassyette	23	
6 September	Stories from Time and Space	Hawkwind	Cherry Red	
13 September	Luck and Strange	David Gilmour	Sony	
20 September	Luck and Strange	David Gilmour	Sony	
27 September	Yesterwynde	Nightwish	Nuclear Blast	
4 October	Post Human: Nex Gen	Bring Me the Horizon	RCA	
11 October	Luck and Strange	David Gilmour	Sony	
18 October	Supercharged	The Offspring	Concord	
25 October	Luck and Strange	David Gilmour	Sony	
1 November	Cartoon Darkness	Amyl and the Sniffers	Rough Trade	
8 November	Luck and Strange	David Gilmour	Sony	
15 November	Earth to Grace	Massive Wagons	Earache	
22 November	From Zero	Linkin Park	Warner Music	
29 November	From Zero	Linkin Park	Warner Music	
6 December	From Zero	Linkin Park	Warner Music	
13 December	From Zero	Linkin Park	Warner Music	
20 December	From Zero	Linkin Park	Warner Music	
27 December	From Zero	Linkin Park	Warner Music	

== See also ==
- List of UK Rock & Metal Singles Chart number ones of 2024
