= List of UK Dance Singles Chart number ones of 2024 =

The UK Dance Singles Chart is a weekly music chart compiled in the United Kingdom by the Official Charts Company (OCC) from sales of songs in the dance music genre (house, drum and bass, dubstep, etc.) in record stores and digital downloads. The chart week runs from Friday to Thursday with the chart-date given as the following Thursday.

This is a list of the songs which were number one on the UK Dance Singles Chart during 2024.

== Chart history ==
Chart date (week ending)	Song	Artist(s)	References
4 January	"Prada"	Cassö, Raye and D-Block Europe	
11 January	"Prada"	Cassö, Raye and D-Block Europe	
18 January	"Murder on the Dancefloor"	Sophie Ellis-Bextor	
25 January	"Murder on the Dancefloor"	Sophie Ellis-Bextor	
1 February	"Murder on the Dancefloor"	Sophie Ellis-Bextor	
8 February	"Murder on the Dancefloor"	Sophie Ellis-Bextor	
15 February	"Murder on the Dancefloor"	Sophie Ellis-Bextor	
22 February	"Murder on the Dancefloor"	Sophie Ellis-Bextor	
29 February	"Murder on the Dancefloor"	Sophie Ellis-Bextor	
7 March	"Murder on the Dancefloor"	Sophie Ellis-Bextor	
14 March	"Prada"	Cassö, Raye and D-Block Europe	
21 March	"Prada"	Cassö, Raye and D-Block Europe	
28 March	"Prada"	Cassö, Raye and D-Block Europe	
4 April	"Prada"	Cassö, Raye and D-Block Europe	
11 April	"Prada"	Cassö, Raye and D-Block Europe	
18 April	"Prada"	Cassö, Raye and D-Block Europe	
25 April	"Prada"	Cassö, Raye and D-Block Europe	
2 May	"Prada"	Cassö, Raye and D-Block Europe	
9 May	"Prada"	Cassö, Raye and D-Block Europe	
16 May	"Prada"	Cassö, Raye and D-Block Europe	
23 May	"Prada"	Cassö, Raye and D-Block Europe	
30 May	"Prada"	Cassö, Raye and D-Block Europe	
6 June	"Prada"	Cassö, Raye and D-Block Europe	
13 June	"Prada"	Cassö, Raye and D-Block Europe	
20 June	"Prada"	Cassö, Raye and D-Block Europe	
27 June	"I Don't Wanna Wait"	David Guetta and OneRepublic	
4 July	"I Don't Wanna Wait"	David Guetta and OneRepublic	
11 July	"I Don't Wanna Wait"	David Guetta and OneRepublic	
18 July	"I Don't Wanna Wait"	David Guetta and OneRepublic	
25 July	"I Don't Wanna Wait"	David Guetta and OneRepublic	
1 August	"Kisses"	Bl3ss and Camrinwatsin featuring Bbyclose	
8 August	"Kisses"	Bl3ss and Camrinwatsin featuring Bbyclose	
15 August	"Kisses"	Bl3ss and Camrinwatsin featuring Bbyclose	
22 August ^{[a]}	"Backbone"	Chase & Status and Stormzy	
29 August ^{[a]}	"Backbone"	Chase & Status and Stormzy	
5 September	"Backbone"	Chase & Status and Stormzy	
12 September	"Backbone"	Chase & Status and Stormzy	
19 September	"Backbone"	Chase & Status and Stormzy	
26 September	"Backbone"	Chase & Status and Stormzy	
3 October	"Backbone"	Chase & Status and Stormzy	
10 October	"Backbone"	Chase & Status and Stormzy	
17 October	"Backbone"	Chase & Status and Stormzy	
24 October	"Somedays"	Sonny Fodera, Jazzy and D.O.D.	
31 October	"Somedays"	Sonny Fodera, Jazzy and D.O.D.	
7 November	"Somedays"	Sonny Fodera, Jazzy and D.O.D.	
14 November	"Somedays"	Sonny Fodera, Jazzy and D.O.D.	
21 November	"Somedays"	Sonny Fodera, Jazzy and D.O.D.	
28 November	"Somedays"	Sonny Fodera, Jazzy and D.O.D.	
5 December	"Somedays"	Sonny Fodera, Jazzy and D.O.D.	
12 December	"Somedays"	Sonny Fodera, Jazzy and D.O.D.	
19 December	"The Days"	Chrystal	
26 December	"The Days"	Chrystal	

- ^{a} – the single was simultaneously number-one on the singles chart.

== Number-one artists ==
Position	Artist	Weeks at number one
1	Cassö	17
1	Raye	17
1	D-Block Europe	17
2	Chase & Status	9
2	Stormzy	9
3	Sophie Ellis-Bextor	8
3	Sonny Fodera	8
3	Jazzy	8
3	D.O.D.	8
4	David Guetta	5
4	OneRepublic	5
5	Bl3ss	3
5	Camrinwatsin	3
6	Chrystal	2

== See also ==
- List of number-one singles of 2024 (UK)
- List of UK Dance Albums Chart number ones of 2024
- List of UK R&B Singles Chart number ones of 2024
- List of UK Rock & Metal Singles Chart number ones of 2024
- List of UK Independent Singles Chart number ones of 2024
