= The Velvet Ditch =

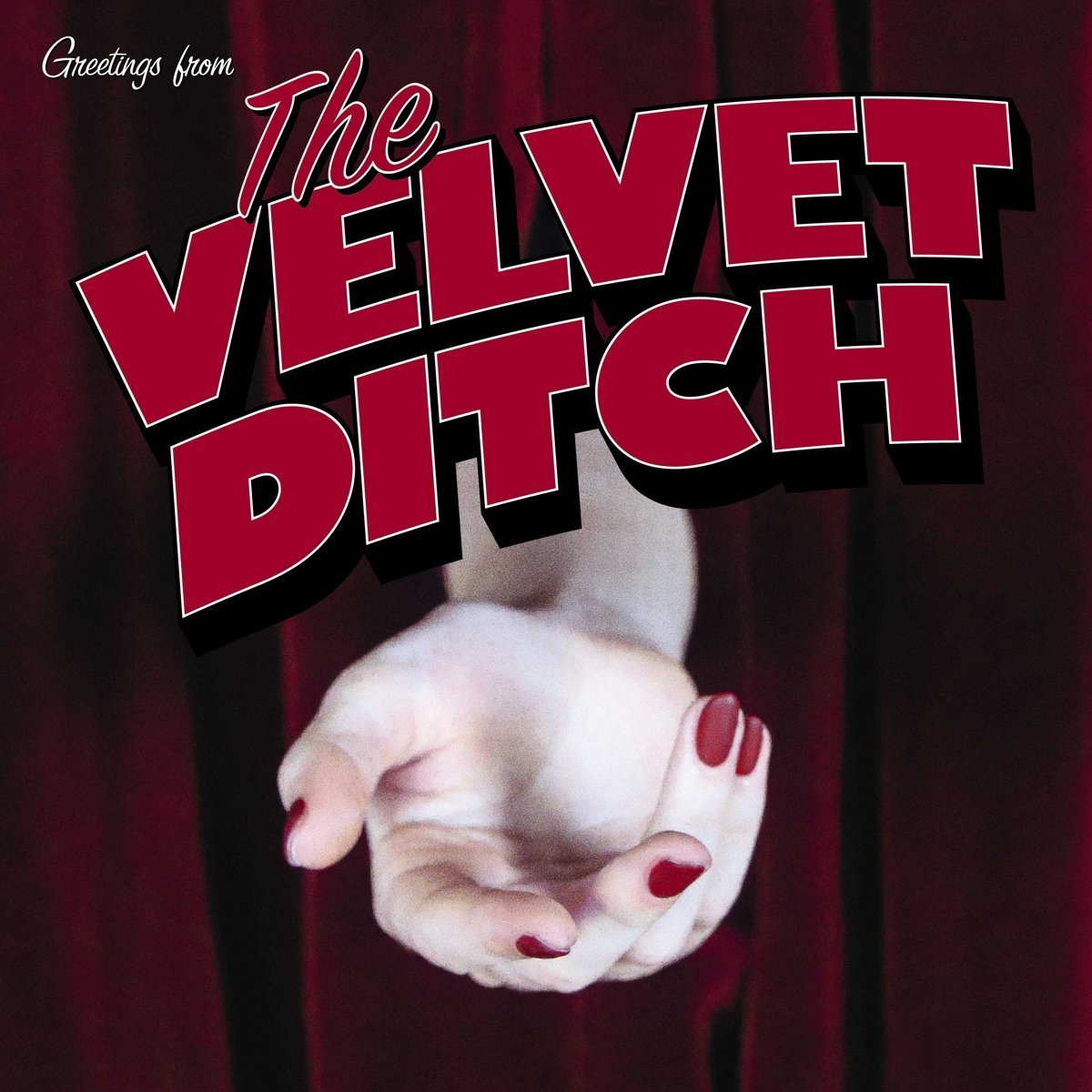

EP by Slaves
- Released: July 19, 2019
- Genre: Punk rock, hardcore punk
- Length: 10:30
- Label: Virgin EMI Records
- Producer: Jolyon Thomas

Slaves chronology
Acts of Fear and Love (2018)	The Velvet Ditch (2019)	Heavy Jelly (2024)

Professional ratings
Review scores
Source	Rating
DIY	4.5/5 stars
NME	3/5 stars
Sputnikmusic	2.8/5

The Velvet Ditch is the second EP by English punk rock duo Slaves, released on 18 July 2019. It was the band's final release before they changed their name to Soft Play in 2022.

== Track listing ==
All tracks are written by Laurie Vincent and Isaac Holman.

No.	Title	Length
1.	"One More Day Won't Hurt"	2:47
2.	"It Makes Me Sick"	1:47
3.	"The Velvet Ditch"	2:17
4.	"When Will I Learn?"	3:39
Total length:		10:30
