= W.L. (album) =

Studio album by the Snuts
- Released: 2 April 2021
- Recorded: 2019–2021
- Studio: The Firepit, London; DTLA Studios, Los Angeles; Serenity Studios, Los Angeles; Club Ralf, London; Eastcote Studios, London; 3Lamps Studio, Glasgow
- Genre: Indie rock
- Length: 45:17
- Label: Parlophone
- Producer: Tony Hoffer; Rich Costey; Inflo; Mark Ralph; Jack Cochrane; Richard Woodcraft

The Snuts chronology
Mixtape (2020)	W.L. (2021)	W.L. (Live from Stirling Castle) (2021)

The Snuts studio albums chronology
W.L. (2021)	Burn the Empire (2022)

Deluxe cover

Singles from W.L.
- 1. "All Your Friends" Released: 23 May 2019; 2. "Maybe California" Released: 6 September 2019; 3. "Juan Belmonte" Released: 18 August 2019; 4. "Coffee & Cigarettes" Released: 28 February 2020; 5. "Elephants" Released: 11 June 2020; 6. "Always" Released: 2 October 2020; 7. "Somebody Loves You" Released: 4 February 2021; 8. "Glasgow" Released: 1 April 2021

W.L. is the debut studio album by Scottish indie rock band the Snuts, released on 2 April 2021 through Parlophone. It entered at number 1 on the UK Albums Chart, making it the first debut album by a Scottish band to do so since the View's Hats Off to the Buskers in 2007.

== Background and release ==
Formed in 2015, the Snuts gained a strong following playing what they describe as "anthemic indie rock" and in November 2018 the band signed with big label Parlophone. In March 2020, the band released their Mixtape EP, showcasing some different influences and styles, and it was met with success, peaking in the Top 20 of the UK Albums Chart.

The album, W.L., was announced on 3 December 2020, with lead singer Jack Cochrane describing it as "our lifetime work. It’s a collection of milestones and melodies that time stamp a dream we had becoming a reality". The Mixtape EP was released just over a week before the UK went into lockdown due to the COVID-19 pandemic, meaning that the band were unable to tour. The band decided they would wait until the end of the pandemic to release W.L., but after "sitting on the record for three years" and with no "resemblance of normality anytime soon", they decided that the album needed to be released. The album was then meant to be released on 19 March 2021, but was delayed for two weeks in order "to combat potential freight delays caused by Brexit and Covid-19". In order to promote the album, the Snuts performed an exclusive live stream gig at Stirling Castle on 26 March, which was then released on 7 April as a live album. Cochrane also played an acoustic set inside Hamilton Mausoleum, which was then aired on the BBC Scotland music show TUNE.

== Singles and composition ==
The album features a total of 8 singles and the album collates the majority of the Snuts' previously released songs. "All Your Friends" was the band's first proper release on Parlophone in May 2019 and along with "Coffee & Cigarettes" appeared on the Mixtape EP. On this EP were also the songs "Boardwalk" and "Don't Forget It (Punk)", which are included on W.L.. "Elephants" peaked at number 2 on the Scottish Singles Chart upon release in June 2020 and "Always" topped the chart in December 2020, making it the last number one before the chart was discontinued. "Somebody Loves You" was released on 4 February 2021 in support of the Scottish Refugee Council.

"Glasgow" and "Sing for Your Supper" were the band's debut and third single, respectively, released in 2016. They were, however, demo versions and the versions on W.L. have been re-recorded. The new version of "Glasgow" was used in a clip to announce the album. On re-recording "Glasgow", Cochrane described it as "heartbreaking", adding "you just try to do it justice. People already loved it, so we basically just got a bottle of wine each and recorded it live to just try to keep as much of that youthful about what we were doing." "Glasgow" was then released as the final single from the album on 1 April 2021, with Cochrane saying that he wanted it "to be the song that kind of introduces this record into the world".

Cochrane has said that many of the tracks were written 10 years ago, when they were around 15 years old. The opening track, the stripped down "Top Deck" is one such example, with the first verse written then, but the second verse was written when recording the album. "Always" is a heartfelt and emotional love song, which shows the band's creativity and progression. The next song, "Juan Belmonte" is an indie rock and roll song, named after the Spanish bullfighter. "All Your Friends" is a "new twist on a familiar social stigma around the drug epidemic that nobody seems to want to talk about". The next track, "Somebody Loves You" is similar to "Always" in that it is a heartfelt and poignant song. It was inspired after Cochrane saw the words "Somebody Loves You" spray painted across Glasgow and is about not taking the small things for granted. "No Place I'd Rather Go" is about missing home and people and had been performed live in 2018 during a concert at the SWG3 in Glasgow.

"Boardwalk" is "set in a stripped back, almost melancholic atmosphere accompanied by intricate guitars and a choir of angels, it shows a more delicate side to their songwriting and shines a spotlight on Jack’s uniquely raw vocals." The following track, "Maybe California" was described as "a true statement piece, oozing indie flair and elevating the band’s fresh and authentic sound". "Don’t Forget It (Punk)" features thrashing guitars and is a comeback to bands who slated them at the beginning, as the band, coming from Whitburn, didn't fit into either the Edinburgh or Glasgow music scene. "Coffee & Cigarettes" is "a song that celebrates the simpler things in life" and harks back to garage rock. "Elephants" is a more poppy song, again showing the band's diverse catalogue, and "is about believing in your own ability in times of struggle and diversity".

The deluxe edition features four tracks that are stripped back and/or acoustic. Cochrane said that "with the deluxe [edition] it's important to try and get the stuff that you would really love to get out there, that maybe never got finished in time". The track "4 Baillie Street" refers to where one of Cochrane's friends lived in Whitburn and they would gather in his loft.

== Recording ==
The album features songs produced by several producers. The band recorded the singles "Elephants", "Always", "Glasgow", the previously unreleased "No Place I'd Rather Go" and the new version of "Sing for Your Supper" at The Firepit in London with producer Tony Hoffer. "Boardwalk" (with additional production by Hoffer), "All My Friends", "Coffee & Cigarettes" and "Microwave" were recorded at DTLA Studios and Serenity Studios in Los Angeles with producer Inflo who is not credited on the album. "Maybe California" was produced by Rich Costey and recorded at Eastcote Studios in London. "Juan Belmonte" was produced by both Inflo and Costey, with recording split between Los Angeles and London. "Don't Forget It (Punk)" was originally produced by Inflo in Los Angeles; however, Cochrane said that "we had some differences with that song", so when the band went back to Glasgow, they decided to record it themselves at 3Lamps Studio, with production by Cochrane. "Somebody Loves You" was recorded at Club Ralph in London with producer by Mark Ralph. The first track, "Top Deck", as well as the remaining three bonus tracks, "Blur Beat", "4 Baillie Street" and "Waterbirds", were produced by Cochrane and engineer Richard Woodcraft at The Firepit.

== Packaging and title ==
The album is available on CD, vinyl and cassette as well as on download and streaming services. The standard release features 13 tracks, whereas the deluxe version features an additional 4 tracks. There were also a further 3 tracks which were exclusively available through pre-order on iTunes. The deluxe version features a slightly different artwork and the CD release will come in a softpack casing, whereas the standard is in a jewel case. The cassette release is available with four different O-card cover sleeves, a photo of each member of the band.

The album title is commonly incorrectly believed to refer to West Lothian. However, it in fact refers to 'Whitburn Loopy', with Cochran's saying "every town in Scotland has what we call young teams, but it's basically gangs. It's a nod to how we started out on the streets and in the forest, playing the guitar, drinking cider and stuff like that. I feel like because the record is such a progression, it's nice to name it something that meant a lot to us back then."

== Reception and chart performance ==
Professional ratings
Review scores
Source	Rating
Belfast Telegraph	6/10
Dork	4/5 stars
Far Out	8/10
Gigwise	7/10
i	2/5 stars
The Independent	4/5 stars
NME	4/5 stars
The Scotsman	3/5 stars

The album was overall met with positive reviews. Reviewing for the NME, Nick Reilly wrote that the band "deliver a record of impressive contrasts" and that "come festival season, should we have one, you sense that this genre-hopping gamble will pay off; it’s more ample proof that guitar music doesn’t just have a place in 2021, but that listeners are in tune enough to embrace and support its variety." Connor Fenton for Dork concluded that the Snuts "manage to invoke a lifetime of feeling in just thirteen bangers that are bursting with adrenaline and melancholy alike. 'W.L' is a masterclass in ballads and risk-taking that proves music works best when it comes from the heart."

W.L. topped the UK Albums Chart with sales of 20,455 album-equivalent units (of which 1,392 were streaming sales). However, it was a close race with Demi Lovato's comeback album Dancing with the Devil... the Art of Starting Over; in the end there were only 272 chart sales between the two. The Snuts were helped out by Lewis Capaldi who recorded a message on social media asking his fans to buy W.L.. Cochrane later said that he "owed him [Capaldi] a few pints" and that "it was nice of him to come out of hiding and do his bit for the young team". Following the number-one chart position, W.L. dipped to number 17 the following week, before disappearing from the top 100 the week after. On the Scottish Albums Chart, W.L. fared better – after topping the chart, it remained in the top-10 for a further two weeks and in total has spent 30 non-consecutive weeks in the top 100.

== Track listing ==
All tracks are written by the Snuts (Jack Cochrane, Callum Wilson, Joe McGillveray and Jordan Mackay), except where noted.

No.	Title	Writer(s)	Length
1.	"Top Deck"		2:38
2.	"Always"		3:23
3.	"Juan Belmonte"		3:11
4.	"All Your Friends"		3:28
5.	"Somebody Loves You"	The Snuts; Aiden Halliday	3:26
6.	"Glasgow"		4:26
7.	"No Place I'd Rather Go"		4:10
8.	"Boardwalk"		3:37
9.	"Maybe California"		2:21
10.	"Don't Forget It (Punk)"		2:10
11.	"Coffee & Cigarettes"	The Snuts; Inflo	2:45
12.	"Elephants"		3:23
13.	"Sing for Your Supper"		6:19
Total length:			45:17

Deluxe edition
No.	Title	Length
14.	"Blur Beat"	3:25
15.	"4 Baillie Street"	3:25
16.	"Microwave"	3:39
17.	"Waterbirds"	3:05
Total length:		58:51

iTunes exclusive pre-order only tracks
No.	Title	Writer(s)	Length
18.	"Somebody Loves You" (One Take in the Firepit)	The Snuts; Aiden Halliday	3:03
19.	"Top Deck" (Alternative Version)		3:16
20.	"Idols"		2:13
Total length:			67:23

== Personnel ==
The Snuts

- Jack Cochrane – lead vocals (1–17), guitar (1–15, 17), piano (16)
- Callum Wilson – bass guitar (2–13, 16), backing vocals (10)
- Joe McGillveray – guitar (2–13, 16), backing vocals (10)
- Jordan Mackay – drums (2–13, 16), backing vocals (5, 6, 10)

Additional musicians

- Ian Burdge – cello (1, 14, 15, 17)
- Tony Hoffer – guitar (2)
- Richard Woodcraft – synthesiser (10)

Technical

- Tony Hoffer – producer (2, 6, 7, 12, 13), additional production (8), mixing (2, 4, 6–8, 11–13)
- Rich Costey – producer (3, 9), mixing (3, 9)
- Inflo – producer (3, 4, 8, 11, 16)
- Mark Ralph – producer (5), mixing (5)
- Jack Cochrane – producer (1, 10, 14, 15, 17), creative direction
- Richard Woodcraft – producer (1, 14, 15, 17), engineer (1, 2, 6, 7, 12–15, 17), mixing (1, 10, 14–17)
- Cameron Lister – assistant engineer (2, 6, 7, 12, 13)
- Nathaniel Graham – assistant engineer (2, 6, 7, 12, 13)
- Adam 'Cecil' Bartlett – engineer (3, 9)
- Tom Campbell – engineer (3, 4, 8, 11, 16)
- Josh Green – engineer (5)
- Gemma Chester – assistant engineer (5)
- Christopher 'Hof' Goldie – engineer (10)
- Matt Colton – mastering (1, 2, 5–7, 10, 12–17)
- Joe LaPorta – mastering (3, 4, 8, 9, 11)
- Mike Lythgoe – creative direction, design
- Callum Wilson – illustrations
- Francesca Costa – artwork commissioner
- Ronan Park – cover photography
- Gary Williamson – booklet photography

== Charts ==
Chart performance for W.L.
Chart (2021)	Peak position
Scottish Albums (OCC)	1
UK Albums (OCC)	1
UK Album Downloads (OCC)	1
UK Vinyl Albums (OCC)	1

== Certifications ==
Certifications for W.L.
Region	Certification	Certified units/sales
United Kingdom (BPI)	Silver	60,000^{‡}
^{‡} Sales+streaming figures based on certification alone.
