= Burn the Empire =

Studio album by the Snuts
- Released: 30 September 2022
- Recorded: 2021–2022
- Studio: Angelic Studio (Brackley, Northamptonshire); The Toyshop (London); Abbey Road Studios (London)
- Genre: Indie rock
- Length: 32:50
- Label: Parlophone
- Producer: Nathaniel "Detonate" Ledwidge; Clarence Coffee Jr.

The Snuts studio albums chronology
| W.L. (2021) | Burn the Empire (2022) | Millennials (2024) |

Singles from Burn the Empire
- 1. "Burn the Empire" Released: 23 November 2021; 2. "Zuckerpunch" Released: 23 February 2022; 3. "End of the Road" Released: 4 May 2022; 4. "The Rodeo" Released: 21 June 2022; 5. "Knuckles" Released: 6 September 2022

Burn the Empire is the second studio album by Scottish indie rock band the Snuts, released on 30 September 2022 through Parlophone.

== Background and release ==
In 2021, the Snuts topped the UK Albums Chart with their debut album, W.L.. It was recorded over three years and included tracks that had been written as early as ten years prior. However, this was not the case with their second album, Burn the Empire, which was written and recorded in eight weeks. Lead singer Jack Cochrane also described the band as being "more cautious" with their songwriting and messages in W.L., something that drastically has changed with the politically fuelled Burn the Empire, as the success and acceptance of their debut album made it feel "a lot easier to use our voices in a more direct manner".

The band also worked more closely with the producers for Burn the Empire. Whereas W.L. largely featured songs only written by the band, Burn the Empire consists of songs co-written with their producers Nathaniel "Detonate" Ledwidge and Clarence Coffee Jr.. Bass guitarist Callum Wilson described Detonate as "[focusing] mainly on musicianship and instrumentation" and introducing the band to new rhythms they hadn't explored before. Wilson also said that Coffee, from Miami, "brings this whole American angle, but he loves London and hates America, so he brings a nice edge to the writing. And melodically I think he can sing in f**king 15 octaves or something – he's unbelievable. So he's helped Jack, even just construct songs vocally and melodically".

Cochrane has said that the Arctic Monkeys were a key influence in the way that "they've managed to stay razor-sharp cool all the way through what they do, but they evolve in a way that people understand". The band "bounce between styles", something that was also seen on W.L., with Cochrane stating that "we've just always had the intention of not putting ourselves in a jangly, indie guitar band box. It's been done, we love it, but it's never a box we wanted to be put in".

Nearly four months after the release of W.L., the band announced in late July 2021 that they had already written and recorded the majority of their follow-up album. The release of the album was announced a year later in June with the release date set for 7 October 2022. However, on 5 September 2022, the band tweeted that they had asked Parlophone if they could release the album earlier so fans could hear the songs before the beginning of their tour, but that the label had refused. The band then urged fans to "bombard" Parlophone to release the album earlier. Several days later, Parlophone released a response addressed to the Snuts fans stating that "the fans will always come first when it comes to music… [and that] we're looking into everything that we can do". On 13 September, the Snuts announced that the release date had been brought forward by a week to 30 September.

== Singles ==
The title track, "Burn the Empire", was released as the first single in November 2021. It opens with a sample of former Cabinet minister Tony Benn offering a reason for creeping authoritarianism in the UK. The song looks at the discontent and unrest in the UK, with Cochrane saying that "I think young people have always wanted a fairer and more equal society and it's the voices of the old, the discontent and the ignorant that try and squash that".

The second single, "Zuckerpunch", released in February 2022, criticises social media and the effect it has psychologically and on society. The titles takes its name from Facebook founder Mark Zuckerberg, with clips of him frequently interspersed in the song's official lyric video.

The Snuts released their first collaborative song for the third single. Released in May, "End of the Road" features vocals by English singer Rachel Chinouriri. Cochrane described the song as a "musical anecdote" and "a remedy for heartache". Chinouriri added that "you can hear the difference in mine and Jack's accents, which I think adds something unique to the song".

"The Rodeo" was released as the fourth single in June. It was the final song to be written for Burn the Empire and was inspired by the Beatles documentary Get Back. Cochrane explained that after watching the documentary, the band went into the studio and "just played the first thing that came into our heads and from there The Rodeo was born". The music video was filmed in Mexico whilst the band were on tour there. It was inspired by Escaramuza charra, the only female equestrian event in the Mexican charrería, and the video features rider Regina Segura Martínez.

The fifth and final single released was "Knuckles" in September. Cochrane described the lyrics as being "inspired by the notion of the strong female spirit I've been lucky enough to be surrounded by throughout life. It's about resilience and strength".

== Recording ==
Burn the Empire was produced and co-written by long-time collaborators Nathaniel "Detonate" Ledwidge and Clarence Coffee Jr. The entirety of the album was recorded at Angelic Studio in Brackley, owned by Miloco Studios, except for "End of the Road" which was also recorded at the Front Room in Abbey Road Studios and the Toyshop in London, also part of Miloco Studios.

== Packaging ==
The album was released on CD, vinyl, cassette and on download and streaming services. Originally, there was only the standard 11-track release; however on 4 October 2022, the Snuts released a bonus track edition of the album on download and streaming services with two live tracks as well as a track that had been previously only available as an iTunes-exclusive preorder of W.L.. Alongside the stand black vinyl release, an exclusive clear vinyl will be released, featuring a different cover. The cassette will be released with four different O-card cover sleeves depicting a Zippo, clipper, matchbox or matches, in keeping with the idea of burning.

== Reception ==
Professional ratings
Review scores
| Source | Rating |
|---|---|
| Clash | 8/10 |
| Far Out | 4/5 stars |
| Gigwise | 7/10 |
| NME | 4/5 stars |
| The Scotsman | 3/5 stars |
| The Telegraph | 4/5 stars |

Reviewing for the NME, Ali Shutler described Burn the Empire as "wonderfully unhinged" and that it "might flicker between wanting to tear everything down and preaching compassionate understanding while it mashes together different genres, but there's still a fierce focus to the record". Shutler concluded with that "every decision, no matter how bonkers, is followed through with confidence and conviction giving the entire thing a reckless energy that champions total freedom". Fiona Shepherd for The Scotsman described the album as a "confident follow-up... [with] no second album bloat here – Burn the Empire takes care of business with less look-what-we-can-do filler than its predecessor". Whilst overall positive about the album, Shepherd was more critical of several songs, namely, "End of the Road", describing it as "banal", and "Cosmic Electronica", describing it as "a not entirely successful experiment in tooled-up electro rock". Joe Tayson for Far Out wrote that "The Snuts have always experimented with different sonic landscapes and been open to trying new ideas. However, one constant aspect that knits Burn The Empire together is honest, compassionate storytelling". He added that whilst the album can be a "source of escapism", "it's a record designed to challenge and make for an uncomfortable listen, it's necessary for these complex times".

== Track listing ==
All tracks are written by the Snuts (Jack Cochrane, Callum Wilson, Joe McGillveray and Jordan Mackay), Nathaniel "Detonate" Ledwidge and Clarence Coffee Jr. except where noted.

Burn the Empire track listing
| No. | Title | Writer(s) | Length |
|---|---|---|---|
| 1. | "Burn the Empire" | | 3:08 |
| 2. | "Zuckerpunch" | The Snuts, Ledwidge, Coffee, Harry Palmer | 2:30 |
| 3. | "The Rodeo" | | 3:04 |
| 4. | "13" | | 3:10 |
| 5. | "Knuckles" | The Snuts, Ledwidge, Coffee, Caroline Sans, Dan Ewins | 2:40 |
| 6. | "End of the Road" (featuring Rachel Chinouriri) | The Snuts, Ledwidge, Coffee, Chinouriri | 3:41 |
| 7. | "Pigeons in New York" | | 2:31 |
| 8. | "Hallelujah Moment" | | 2:15 |
| 9. | "Cosmic Electronica" | | 3:57 |
| 10. | "Yesterday" | | 3:02 |
| 11. | "Blah Blah Blah" | | 2:53 |
| Total length: | | | 32:50 |

Burn the Empire digital-only extended edition bonus tracks
| No. | Title | Length |
|---|---|---|
| 12. | "Idols" (Originally pre-order only on W.L.) | 2:13 |
| 13. | "End of the Road" (Live, Alternate Version) | 3:28 |
| 14. | "Elephants" (featuring Bemz; Live from Brixton Academy) | 4:52 |
| Total length: | | 42:43 |

== Personnel ==
The Snuts

- Jack Cochrane – lead vocals (1–11), guitar (1–9, 11), acoustic guitar (10)
- Joe McGillveray – guitar (1–9, 11), backing vocals (1–9, 11)
- Callum Wilson – bass guitar (1–9, 11), backing vocals (1–9, 11)
- Jordan Mackay – drums (1–9, 11), backing vocals (1–9, 11)

Additional musicians

- Clarence Coffee Jr. – backing vocals (1, 2, 4, 7, 9)
- Dan Ewins – drum programming (1, 2, 4, 6–9, 11), programming (1, 10), electric guitar (1, 2, 4–6, 8, 9, 11), bass guitar (1, 2, 5, 6, 8, 9, 11), acoustic guitar (4), bass guitar programming (6), slide guitar (9), piano (10)
- Nathaniel "Detonate" Ledwidge – piano (4), keyboards (4, 9)
- Rachel Chinouriri – vocals (6)
- Davide Rossi – strings (6), strings arrangement (6)

Technical

- Nathaniel "Detonate" Ledwidge – producer (1–11)
- Clarence Coffee Jr. – producer (1–11), executive producer
- Dan Ewins – additional production (1–11), engineer
- Sur Back – additional production (5)
- Rob Kinelski – mixing at the Fortress of Amplitude
- Eli Heisler – assistant mixing
- Miles Showell – mastering at Abbey Road Studios

== Charts ==
Chart performance for Burn the Empire
| Chart (2022) | Peak position |
|---|---|
| Scottish Albums (OCC) | 1 |
| UK Albums (OCC) | 3 |
| UK Album Downloads (OCC) | 3 |
| UK Vinyl Albums (OCC) | 2 |
