= Acts of Fear and Love =

Studio album by Slaves
- Released: 17 August 2018
- Genre: Punk rock
- Length: 29:39
- Label: Virgin EMI
- Producer: Joylon Thomas

Slaves chronology
Take Control (2016)	Acts of Fear and Love (2018)	The Velvet Ditch (2019)

Singles from Acts of Fear and Love
- 1. "Cut and Run" Released: 12 June 2018; 2. "Chokehold" Released: 31 July 2018; 3. "Magnolia" Released: 12 October 2018

Professional ratings
Aggregate scores
Source	Rating
Metacritic	77/100
Review scores
Source	Rating
Clash	8/10
DIY	4/5 stars
NME	4/5 stars
Q	3/5 stars
The Independent	4/5 stars
The Line of Best Fit	8/10

Acts of Fear and Love is the third studio album by English punk rock duo Slaves, released on 17 August 2018. It was the final studio album released by the band before they changed their name to Soft Play in 2022.

== Track listing ==
All music is composed by Slaves

No.	Title	Lyrics	Length
1.	"The Lives They Wish They Had"	Laurie Vincent; Isaac Holman	2:51
2.	"Cut and Run"	Vincent; Jolyon Thomas; Holman	2:42
3.	"Bugs"	Vincent; Holman	3:00
4.	"Magnolia"	Vincent; Holman	4:02
5.	"Daddy"	Vincent; Holman	1:50
6.	"Chokehold"	Vincent; Holman	3:21
7.	"Photo Opportunity"	Vincent; Holman	3:30
8.	"Artificial Intelligence"	Vincent; Holman	3:13
9.	"Acts of Fear and Love"	Vincent; Holman	5:05
Total length:			29:39

== Personnel ==
Slaves

- Isaac Holman - lead vocals, drums, handclaps
- Laurie Vincent - guitars, backing vocals, handclaps

Production

- Joylon Thomas - producer, mixing, engineering
- Dick Beetham - mastering
- James Mottershead - engineering
- Kristian Donaldson - engineering assistant

== Charts ==
Chart (2018)	Peak position
Scottish Albums (OCC)	8
UK Albums (OCC)	8
