= Take Control (album) =

Studio album by Slaves
- Released: 30 September 2016
- Recorded: Jackson Browne's studio, Santa Monica, California
- Genre: Punk rock; post-punk
- Length: 42:22
- Label: Virgin EMI
- Producer: Mike D

Slaves chronology
Are You Satisfied? (2015)	Take Control (2016)	Acts of Fear and Love (2018)

Singles from Take Control
- 1. "Spit It Out" Released: 30 September 2016; 2. "Take Control" Released: 28 October 2016

Professional ratings
Aggregate scores
Source	Rating
Metacritic	72/100
Review scores
Source	Rating
AllMusic	3.5/5 stars
NME	4/5 stars
The Line of Best Fit	8/10
Clash	7/10
Drowned in Sound	7/10
PopMatters	6/10
The Music	4/5 stars
The Guardian	2/5 stars
The Soundboard	4/10

Take Control is the second studio album by English punk rock duo Slaves, released on 30 September 2016. The album was produced by former Beastie Boys member Mike D, who also makes a guest appearance on the song "Consume or Be Consumed". Lead single "Spit It Out" debuted at number 37 on the UK Rock & Metal Singles Chart upon its initial release, later re-entering at number 28.

== Background ==
Producer Mike D said of the album and the band:

I feel right now the world needs an album like this. Something that is more raw, more alive and less polished. I was impressed with the band's strong point of view. They actually speak their minds about social topics [...] The initial conversation I had with [guitarist] Laurie [Vincent], there were so many influences he mentioned that I love – from the Gang of Four to The Cramps to The Damned to Public Image Ltd to The Slits and on and on. All records that I truly loved and I couldn't believe he knew all of them so well for a person his age.

Vincent said that the album is "more well-rounded" than their debut album, and that it "dips a bit further in to politics" with their aim being to "inspire people to have an opinion". There will also be "a few songs where [they] play [their] instruments differently and Isaac might be on bass while Vincent plays guitar, and Isaac raps a bit". The duo wanted to "write some heavier music" that was "very guitar-based and thrashy" but had to slow the songs down due to "various injuries".

== Promotion ==
In order to promote Take Control, Slaves initially announced a 15-date UK tour in November 2016, although later announced a smaller-scale "Back in the Van" UK tour for September 2016 to precede the release of the album, in which the band are set to play much smaller venues across the UK, which normally "never get bands coming back to them" when they become more widely known. In order to acquire tickets, buyers had to pre-order the album from the band's website before tickets went on sale. Tickets for all venues had fully sold out within an hour.

== Accolades ==
Publication	Accolade	Year	Rank
NME	NME's Albums of the Year 2016	2016	38

== Track listing ==
No.	Title	Writer(s)	Length
1.	"Spit It Out"	Isaac Holman, Laurie Vincent	2:41
2.	"Hypnotised"	Holman, Vincent	2:59
3.	"Consume or Be Consumed" (featuring Mike D)	Mike D, Holman, Vincent	3:20
4.	"Take Control"	Holman, Vincent	1:52
5.	"Mr. Industry" (skit)	Holman, Vincent	0:12
6.	"Rich Man"	Holman, Vincent	2:17
7.	"Play Dead"	Holman, Vincent	2:35
8.	"Lies"	Holman, Vincent	4:05
9.	"Fuck the Hi-Hat"	Holman, Vincent	0:44
10.	"Gary" (skit)	Holman, Vincent	0:14
11.	"People That You Meet"	Joel Amey, Holman, Vincent	3:41
12.	"Steer Clear" (featuring Baxter Dury)	Fabienne Débarre, Holman, Vincent	2:53
13.	"Cold Hard Floor"	Holman, Vincent	4:15
14.	"STD's / PhD's"	Holman, Vincent	3:12
15.	"Angelica"	Holman, Vincent	3:38
16.	"Same Again"	Holman, Vincent	3:44
Total length:			42:22

== Charts ==
Chart (2016)	Peak position
Scottish Albums (Official Charts)	9
UK Albums (Official Charts)	6
