= List of UK R&B Albums Chart number ones of 2024 =

The logo of the Official Charts Company, responsible for compiling all of the official music charts in the United Kingdom, including the R&B albums chart.

The UK R&B Albums Chart is a weekly chart, first introduced in October 1994, that ranks the 40 biggest-selling albums that are classified in the R&B genre in the United Kingdom. The chart is compiled by the Official Charts Company, and is based on sales of CDs, downloads, vinyl and other formats over the previous seven days.

The following are the number-one albums of 2024

== Number-one albums ==
Issue date	Album	Artist(s)	Record label	Ref.
4 January	Straight Outta Compton	N.W.A	Priority	
11 January	Straight Outta Compton	N.W.A	Priority	
18 January	Straight Outta Compton	N.W.A	Priority	
25 January ^{[a]}	Rolling Stone	D-Block Europe	D-Block Europe	
1 February	Quaranta	Danny Brown	Warp	
8 February	Back to Black	Amy Winehouse	Island	
15 February	Back to Black	Amy Winehouse	Island	
22 February	Don't Take It Personal	Dizzee Rascal	Big Dirte 3	
29 February	This Is Me... Now	Jennifer Lopez	BMG	
7 March	Thanks for Hating	Potter Payper	36TL	
14 March	Reflection	Skrapz	1&Only	
21 March	Back to Black	Amy Winehouse	Island	
28 March	Do Not Disturb	Nemzzz	Nemzzz	
4 April	Tyla	Tyla	SInce 93/Atlantic	
11 April	Back to Black	Amy Winehouse	Island	
18 April	Humble as the Sun	Bob Vylan	Ghost Theatre	
25 April	Back to Black	Amy Winehouse	Island	
2 May	Back to Black	Amy Winehouse	Island	
9 May	Against All Odds	Mazza L20	Rebel	
16 May	Signed To the T	Kaymuni	36 TL	
23 May	The Loop	Jordan Rakei	Decca	
30 May	Back to Black	Amy Winehouse	Island	
6 June	TRU	Meekz	Neighbourhood	
13 June	Smile?	K-Trap	Thousand8	
20 June	Back to Black	Amy Winehouse	Island	
27 June	Kneecap	Kneecap	Heavenly	
4 July	Crash	Kehlani	Atlantic	
11 July	Back to Black	Amy Winehouse	Island	
18 July	Back to Black	Amy Winehouse	Island	
25 July ^{[a]} ^{[b]}	The Death of Slim Shady (Coup de Grâce)	Eminem	Interscope	
1 August	British Trap Royalty	Morrisson	NQ	
8 August ^{[a]} ^{[b]}	The Death of Slim Shady (Coup de Grâce)	Eminem	Interscope	
15 August	Vultures 2	Kanye West and Ty Dolla Sign	YZY	
22 August	Vultures 2	Kanye West and Ty Dolla Sign	YZY	
29 August	Back to Black	Amy Winehouse	Island	
5 September	Days Before Rodeo	Travis Scott	Cactus Jack/Epic	
6 September	Back to Black	Amy Winehouse	Island	
13 September	The FORCE	LL Cool J	LL Cool J	
20 September	The Death of Slim Shady (Coup de Grâce)	Eminem	Interscope	
27 September	The Death of Slim Shady (Coup de Grâce)	Eminem	Interscope	
4 October	Quit While You're Ahead	Nines	Zino	
11 October	Leon	Leon Bridges	Columbia	
18 October	The Death of Slim Shady (Coup de Grâce)	Eminem	Interscope	
25 October	Burn the Right Things Down	Maverick Sabre	FAMM	
1 November ^{[a]}	Chromakopia	Tyler, the Creator	Columbia	
8 November	Chromakopia	Tyler, the Creator	Columbia	
15 November	Conglomerate	Fimiguerrero/Len/Lancey Foux	Lizzy	
22 November	Access All Areas	Flo	Island	
29 November ^{[a]} ^{[b]}	GNX	Kendrick Lamar	Interscope	
6 December	The Death of Slim Shady (Coup de Grâce)	Eminem	Interscope	
13 December	Back to Black	Amy Winehouse	Island	
20 December	Missionary	Snoop Dogg and Dr. Dre	Interscope	
27 December	Back to Black	Amy Winehouse	Island	

== Notes ==
- ^{a} - The album was simultaneously number-one on the UK Albums Chart.
- ^{b} - The artist was simultaneously number-one on the R&B Singles Chart.

== See also ==
- List of UK Albums Chart number ones of the 2020s
- List of UK R&B Singles Chart number ones of 2024
