= The Snuts =

Scottish indie rock band

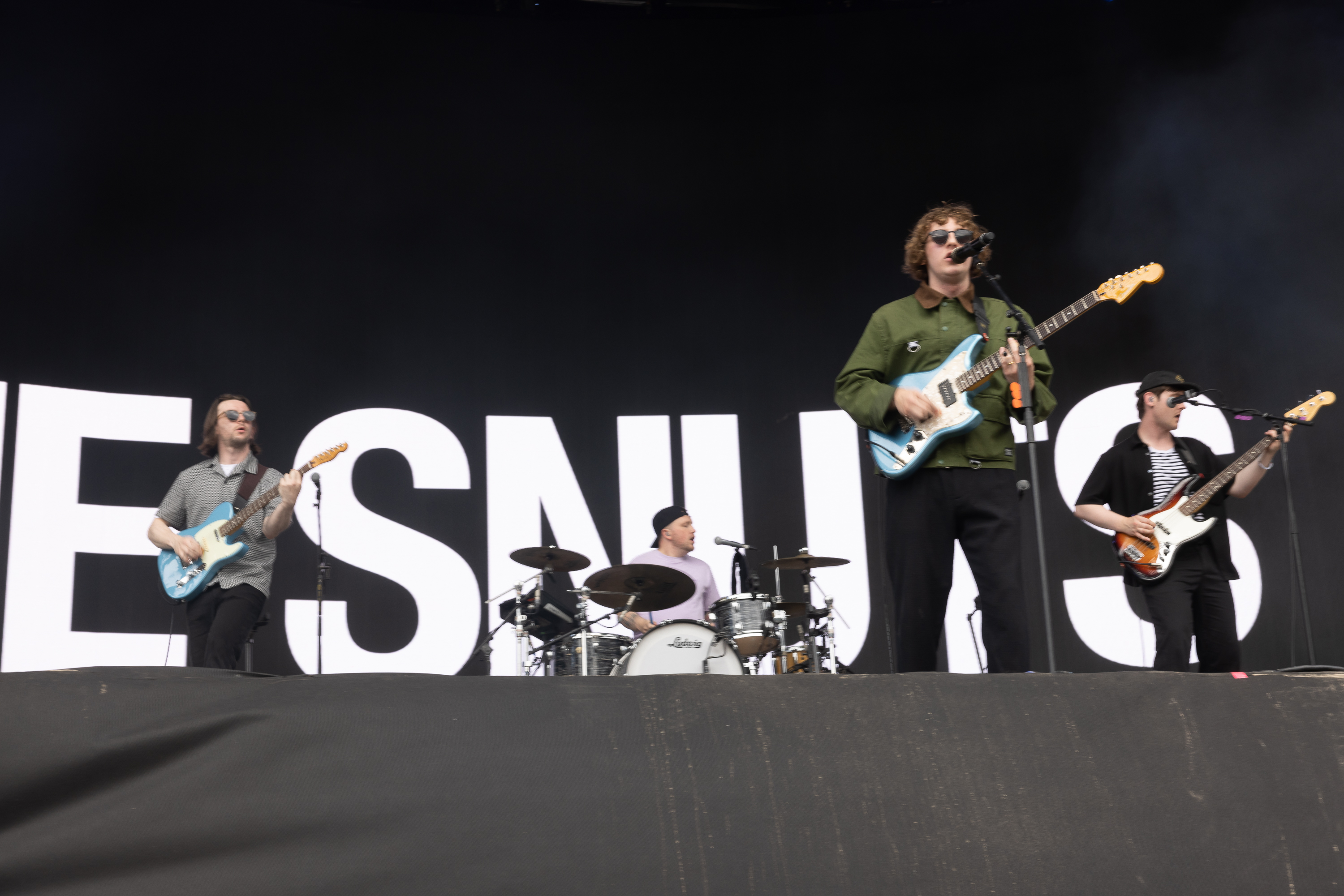
- The Snuts at Splendour in the Grass, 2022

Background information
- Origin: Whitburn, West Lothian, Scotland
- Genres: Indie rock; alternative rock
- Years active: 2015–present
- Labels: Parlophone; Happy Artist
- Members: Jack Cochrane; Callum Wilson; Joe McGillveray; Jordan Mackay
- Website: thesnuts.co.uk

The Snuts are a Scottish indie rock band formed in 2015, originating from West Lothian, Scotland. They have performed across the United Kingdom and Ireland. The band consists of Jack Cochrane (vocals and guitar), Joe McGillveray (guitar), Callum '29' Wilson (bass) and Jordan 'Joko' Mackay (drums) and was formed when the members were in school.

== History ==
Wilson, McGillveray and McKay went to primary school with each other and they met Cochrane at secondary school.

Wilson has said "we’ve only ever really played music together so I can’t really imagine it any other way". They have been influenced by the likes of the Libertines and Arctic Monkeys, and Scottish Ned culture growing up. They have also said that "one of our biggest inspirations is not to sound exactly like everybody else". Before going full time as a band, Cochrane was a joiner, Wilson was a slater/roofer, and Mackay was a mechanic.

The band's debut single, the demo "Glasgow" was described as a 'stunning track with heaps of melody' and quickly lead to an ever since growing fanbase. After releasing several other demo singles in 2016, the Snuts released the self-produced EP The Matador in June 2017.

The Snuts released their first 'proper' single, "Seasons" in June 2018, described as 'conventional in a much-needed and refreshing way', a 'total throwback to the last renaissance of alternative music' and 'impeccably pieced together, designed to detonate on impact'. The following month, they then played at Scotland's TRNSMT Festival at the King Tut's Stage. In September, "Manhattan Project" was released, produced by Dave McCracken. In November 2018, the band signed with Parlophone Records. In March 2019, the band made their US debut at the South By South West festival in Austin, Texas, and their first single under Parlophone, "All Your Friends", was released in May. It was produced by Inflo and was the first single from their second EP Mixtape. It was described as having "an irresistibly catchy raw edge and a massive chorus" and Cochrane explained that it was a "new twist on a familiar social stigma around the drug epidemic that nobody seems to want to talk about".

In July 2019 they performed again at TRNSMT, this time on the Main Stage; in August they performed at the Reading and Leeds Festivals and also at Victorious Festival. The band's next single "Maybe California" was released in September 2019 and was produced by Rich Costey. "Juan Belmonte", named after the Spanish bullfighter, and also produced by Costey, was released in October. In January 2020, the Snuts released a cover of Bruno Mars' "When I Was Your Man" from sessions at the Firepit Recording Studios in London. Two further singles, "Fatboy Slim" (in "homage of Fatboy Slim's notorious set at Brighton beach" in 2002) and "Coffee & Cigarettes" were released before March, whereupon the EP Mixtape was released. The EP consists of 5 songs which showcase different influences and 4 interludes, which are studio outtakes, giving a kind of informal feel to the EP. The EP peaked at number 14 on the UK Albums Chart and also topped the Scottish Albums Chart, as well as the UK Vinyl Albums Chart. Following the success of Mixtape, the Snuts quickly released their next single, a cover of the Lovin' Spoonful's "Summer in the City". Like their previous cover song, this was a Firepit session. It was also featured in an advert for Strongbow cider in August 2020.

The following single "Elephants" was released in June 2020 and was produced by Tony Hoffer. It topped the iTunes Singles Chart on the day of its release. Cochrane described it as "another twist on our ever-growing diverse catalogue". In August during the COVID-19 pandemic, the band supported the Libertines at a socially-distanced performance at the Virgin Money Unity Arena in Newcastle. "That's All It Is" was released in September and features on the soundtrack to the video game FIFA 21. A week later, the Snuts released "Always", with Cochrane saying "the song depicts the message of falling in love with someone who in turn allows you to love yourself". "Always" was the final number one single on the Scottish Singles Chart before it was discontinued in December 2020.

In December, the band announced the release of their debut album W.L. on 19 March 2021, later pushed back to 2 April. It includes 10 previously released singles, three of which featured on the EP Mixtape, and three previously unreleased songs. The deluxe edition also includes four previously unreleased bonus tracks. In February 2021, a new single, "Somebody Loves You" was released in support of the Scottish Refugee Council, with the band donating the budget for the music video to the charity. Before its release, the Snuts performed the album at Stirling Castle and it was later released as a live album. W.L. debuted at number one on the UK Albums Chart, making the Snuts the first Scottish band to do so with their debut album since The View in 2007.

Because of COVID-19 restrictions, the band were unable to go on tour until the end of July, whereupon they began a UK tour. In October, they briefly toured the US, before returning to the UK to continue their tour there. Between January and February 2022, the Snuts supported the Kooks as an opening act for their nationwide tour promoting their upcoming album 10 Tracks to Echo in the Dark. In June, they supported Louis Tomlinson along with Californian band Sun Room for a couple performances in Mexico. The Snuts opened for Tomlinson again in 2023 on the North America leg of his Faith in the Future World Tour. From 28 June to 1 July 2022, the Snuts were the opening act for Kings of Leon during the latter's When You See Yourself tour.

In July 2021, the Snuts announced that they had already written their second album. In November, the first single, "Burn the Empire", was released. Several other singles were released in 2022, including a collaboration with Rachel Chinouriri entitled "End of the Road", and their album Burn the Empire was announced in June 2022 and released on 7 October 2022. However, in early September, following an online campaign by the band to make Parlophone release the album earlier, the release date was brought forward to 30 September. Burn the Empire peaked at number 3 on the UK Albums Chart.

Following the release of Burn the Empire, the Snuts decided not to renew their contract with Parlophone. Instead, they decided to leave and set up their own label, Happy Artist Records, with distributor The Orchard. On leaving Parlophone, Cochrane said that "throughout the last campaign it was clear our vision as artists and that of the label, had drifted apart significantly" and that "The Orchard felt like a safe home we could transition to smoothly. It was clear from the offset they understood the core values of The Snuts and the community that comes with us". The first release on their new label came in May 2023 with "Gloria".They released their third album Millennials on 23 February 2024. The band released "Defibrillator" in June 2026 as a single for their album Joy In Short Moments, which was released on 30 October 2026.

== Discography ==
=== Albums ===
==== Studio albums ====
Title	Details	Peak chart positions		Certification
Title	Details	UK	SCO	Certification
W.L.	Released: 2 April 2021; Label: Parlophone; Formats: Digital download, streaming, CD, cassette, LP	1	1	BPI: Silver
Burn the Empire	Released: 30 September 2022; Label: Parlophone; Formats: Digital download, streaming, CD, cassette, LP	3	1	
Millennials	Released: 23 February 2024; Label: Happy Artist; Formats: Digital download, streaming, CD, LP	2	1	
Joy in Short Moments	Released: 30 October 2026; Label: Happy Artist; Formats: Digital download, streaming, CD, LP	4	1	

==== Live albums ====
Title	Details
W.L. (Live from Stirling Castle)	Released: 7 April 2021; Label: Parlophone; Formats: Digital download, streaming, LP

=== Extended plays ===
Title	Details	Peak chart positions	
Title	Details	UK	SCO
The Matador	Released: 30 June 2017; Label: The Snuts; Formats: Digital download, CD	—	—
Mixtape EP	Released: 13 March 2020; Label: Parlophone; Formats: Digital download, CD, Cassette, 12-inch	14	1
"—" denotes a recording that did not chart or was not released.

=== Singles ===
Year	Title	Peak chart positions		Certification	Album
Year	Title	UK	SCO	Certification	Album
2016	"Glasgow" (demo)	—	—	BPI: Silver	Non-album singles
2016	"Proper" (demo)	—	—		Non-album singles
2016	"Sing for Your Supper" (demo)	—	—		Non-album singles
2018	"Seasons"	—	—		Non-album singles
2018	"Manhattan Project"	—	—		Non-album singles
2019	"All Your Friends"	—	—		W.L.
2019	"Maybe California"	—	87		W.L.
2019	"Juan Belmonte"	—	—		W.L.
2020	"When I Was Your Man" (Firepit Session)	—	—		Non-album single
2020	"Fatboy Slim"	—	98		Mixtape
2020	"Coffee & Cigarettes"	—	—		W.L.
2020	"Summer in the City" (Firepit Session)	—	—		Non-album single
2020	"Elephants"	— (Note: "Elephants" did not enter the UK Singles Chart, but peaked at number 28 on the UK Singles Downloads Chart.)	2		W.L.
2020	"That's All It Is"	—	40		Non-album single
2020	"Always"	— (Note: "Always" did not enter the UK Singles Chart, but peaked at number two on the UK Physical Singles Chart.)	1	BPI: Silver	W.L.
2021	"Somebody Loves You"	—	×		W.L.
2021	"Glasgow"	—	×		W.L.
2021	"Burn the Empire"	—	×		Burn the Empire
2022	"Zuckerpunch"	—	×		Burn the Empire
2022	"End of the Road" (feat. Rachel Chinouriri)	—	x		Burn the Empire
2022	"The Rodeo"	—	x		Burn the Empire
2022	"Knuckles"	—	x		Burn the Empire
2023	"Gloria"	—	x		Millennials
2023	"Dreams"	—	x		Millennials
2023	"NPC"	—	x		Millennials
2023	"Deep Diving"	—	×		Millennials
2024	"Millionaires"	—	×		Millennials
2026	"Summer Rain"	—	×		Joy in Short Moments
2026	"Motherlands"	–	×		Joy in Short Moments
2026	"Defibrillator"	–	×		Joy in Short Moments
2026	"In Motion"	–	×		Joy in Short Moments
2026	"PTS"	–	×		Joy in Short Moments
"—" denotes a recording that did not chart or was not released in that territory. "×" denotes periods where charts did not exist or were not archived. (Note: "The Scottish Singles Chart was discontinued in December 2020)

=== Music videos ===
Year	Title	Director
2016	"Glasgow (Demo)"	N/A
2016	"Proper (Demo)"	N/A
2018	"Manhattan Project"	N/A
2019	"All Your Friends"	Ronan Corrigan and Hope Kemp
2019	"Maybe California"	Ronan Corrigan and Hope Kemp
2020	"Fatboy Slim"	Cassidy Burcher
2020	"Coffee & Cigarettes"	N/A
2020	"Don't Forget It (Punk)"	Animation by Ladybug Films
2020	"Elephants"	Aella Jordan-Edge
2020	"Always"	Michael Sherrington
2021	"Somebody Loves You"	Michael Sherrington
2021	"Glasgow"	N/A
2021	"Burn the Empire"	N/A
2022	"Zuckerpunch" (lyric video)	N/A
2022	"End of the Road"	N/A
2022	"The Rodeo"	Alice Backham

== Members ==
- Jack Cochrane – vocals, guitar (2015–present)
- Joe McGillveray – guitar (2015–present)
- Callum '29' Wilson – bass (2015–present)
- Jordan 'Joko' Mackay – drums (2015–present)
