= List of UK R&B Singles Chart number ones of 2024 =

The logo of the Official Charts Company, responsible for compiling all of the official music charts in the United Kingdom, including the R&B singles chart.

The UK R&B Singles Chart is a weekly chart that ranks the 40 biggest-selling singles and albums that are classified in the R&B genre in the United Kingdom. The chart is compiled by the Official Charts Company, and is based on both physical, and digital sales.

The following are the songs which have topped the UK R&B Singles Chart in 2024.

== Number-one singles ==
Chart date (week ending)	Song	Artist(s)	Record label	References
4 January	"Lovin on Me"	Jack Harlow	Atlantic	
11 January	"Lovin on Me"	Jack Harlow	Atlantic	
18 January	"Lovin on Me"	Jack Harlow	Atlantic	
25 January	"Lovin on Me"	Jack Harlow	Atlantic	
1 February	"Lovin on Me"	Jack Harlow	Atlantic	
8 February	"Lovin on Me"	Jack Harlow	Atlantic	
15 February	"Lovin on Me"	Jack Harlow	Atlantic	
22 February	"Lovin on Me"	Jack Harlow	Atlantic	
29 February	"Lovin on Me"	Jack Harlow	Atlantic	
7 March	"Carnival"	Kanye West and Ty Dolla Sign featuring Playboi Carti and Rich the Kid	YZY	
14 March	"Carnival"	Kanye West and Ty Dolla Sign featuring Playboi Carti and Rich the Kid	YZY	
21 March	"Carnival"	Kanye West and Ty Dolla Sign featuring Playboi Carti and Rich the Kid	YZY	
28 March	"Carnival"	Kanye West and Ty Dolla Sign featuring Playboi Carti and Rich the Kid	YZY	
4 April	"Like That"	Future, Metro Boomin and Kendrick Lamar	Epic/Freebandz	
11 April	"Like That"	Future, Metro Boomin and Kendrick Lamar	Epic/Freebandz	
18 April	"Like That"	Future, Metro Boomin and Kendrick Lamar	Epic/Freebandz	
25 April	"Like That"	Future, Metro Boomin and Kendrick Lamar	Epic/Freebandz	
2 May	"Push Ups"	Drake	OVO/Republic	
9 May	"Push Ups"	Drake	OVO/Republic	
16 May	"Not Like Us"	Kendrick Lamar	Interscope	
23 May	"Not Like Us"	Kendrick Lamar	Interscope	
30 May	"Not Like Us"	Kendrick Lamar	Interscope	
6 June	"Band4Band"	Central Cee featuring Lil Baby	Columbia/Capitol	
13 June ^{[a]}	"Houdini"	Eminem	Interscope	
20 June ^{[a]}	"Houdini"	Eminem	Interscope	
27 June	"Houdini"	Eminem	Interscope	
4 July	"Houdini"	Eminem	Interscope	
11 July	"Houdini"	Eminem	Interscope	
18 July	"Houdini"	Eminem	Interscope	
25 July ^{[b]}	"Houdini"	Eminem	Interscope	
1 August	"Houdini"	Eminem	Interscope	
8 August ^{[b]}	"Houdini"	Eminem	Interscope	
15 August	"Kehlani"	Jordan Adetunji	Indigo Kid	
22 August	"Kehlani"	Jordan Adetunji	Indigo Kid	
29 August	"Kehlani"	Jordan Adetunji	Indigo Kid	
5 September	"Kehlani"	Jordan Adetunji	Indigo Kid	
12 September	"Kehlani"	Jordan Adetunji	Indigo Kid	
19 September	"Kehlani"	Jordan Adetunji	Indigo Kid	
26 September	"Kehlani"	Jordan Adetunji	Indigo Kid	
3 October	"Embrace It"	Ndotz	Isekai	
10 October	"Timeless"	The Weeknd and Playboi Carti	Republic/XO	
17 October	"Thick of It"	KSI featuring Trippie Redd	Atlantic	
24 October	"Thick of It"	KSI featuring Trippie Redd	Atlantic	
31 October	"Thick of It"	KSI featuring Trippie Redd	Atlantic	
7 November	"Thick of It"	KSI featuring Trippie Redd	Atlantic	
14 November	"Thick of It"	KSI featuring Trippie Redd	Atlantic	
21 November	"Thick of It"	KSI featuring Trippie Redd	Atlantic	
28 November	"Thick of It"	KSI featuring Trippie Redd	Atlantic	
5 December ^{[b]}	"Squabble Up"	Kendrick Lamar	Interscope	
12 December	"Luther"	Kendrick Lamar and SZA	Interscope	
19 December	"Timeless"	The Weeknd and Playboi Carti	Republic/XO	
26 December	"Dirty"	KSI	Atlantic	

== Notes ==
- ^{a} - The single was simultaneously number one on the UK Singles Chart.
- ^{b} - The artist was simultaneously number one on the R&B Albums Chart.

== See also ==
- List of UK Singles Chart number ones of 2024
- List of UK R&B Albums Chart number ones of 2024
- List of UK Dance Singles Chart number ones of 2024
