= Millennials (album) =

Studio album by the Snuts
- Released: 23 February 2024
- Studio: Watercolour Music (Fort William); Anjuna Recording Studios (Portland, Oregon); Magic Box (Dundee); Alchemy Studio (London)
- Genre: Indie rock
- Length: 29:53
- Label: Happy Artist
- Producer: Scotty Anderson; Jack Cochrane

The Snuts chronology
Burn the Empire (2022)	Millennials (2024)

Singles from Millennials
- 1. "Gloria" Released: 23 May 2023; 2. "Dreams" Released: 23 August 2023; 3. "NPC" Released: 20 November 2023; 4. "Deep Diving" Released: 27 November 2023; 5. "Millionaires" Released: 19 January 2024

Millennials is the third studio album by Scottish indie rock band the Snuts, released on 23 February 2024 through Happy Artist Records.

== Background and singles ==
Only months after the release of their second studio album, Burn the Empire (2022), the band made a "rapturous return" with the lead single "Gloria" on 23 May 2023, which was described as "an anthemic, summer song". The song was the debut release of their newly established independent label Happy Artist Records, distributed by The Orchard, a consequence of the band's discontent with their previous label.

Going into the creative process of a forthcoming record, the band asked themselves if there were any songs they had forgotten to write. As a result, they tapped "into the emotions" they had previously not "processed into music", referred to as the "big boiling points in your life". According to Jack Cochrane, the approach to songwriting was more direct than on previous records. On 27 November, alongside the release of the fourth single "Deep Diving", the band announced Millennials slated for 23 February 2024, accompanied by launch shows at Glasgow Barrowlands the following week. In support of the album, the Snuts will also play a series of shows in the United Kingdom in November and December 2024. A final single "Millionaires", which "takes aim at society's obsession with building a false sense of happiness", was released on 19 January 2024.

== Track listing ==
All tracks are written by Scotty Anderson, Jack Cochrane, Callum Wilson, Joe McGillveray and Jordan Mackay.

Millennials track listing
No.	Title	Length
1.	"Gloria"	2:32
2.	"Millionaires"	3:00
3.	"Yoyo"	2:48
4.	"NPC"	2:47
5.	"Butterside Down"	2:43
6.	"Novastar"	2:57
7.	"Dreams"	2:47
8.	"Wunderkind"	3:14
9.	"Deep Diving"	2:59
10.	"Circles"	4:06
Total length:		29:53

Millennials deluxe edition tracks
No.	Title	Length
11.	"Mexico"	2:14
12.	"Right Hand Girl"	3:19
13.	"Jam_5.mp3"	1:38
Total length:		37:04

Millennials digital deluxe edition tracks
No.	Title	Length
14.	"WGO"	4:46
15.	"Gloria" (Acoustic)	2:42
16.	"Millionaires" (Acoustic)	3:10
Total length:		47:42

== Personnel ==
The Snuts

- Jack Cochrane – lead vocals (1–10), acoustic guitar (1, 9), electric guitar (2–6, 8, 10)
- Joe McGillveray – electric guitar (1–10), background vocals (5, 10)
- Callum Wilson – electric bass guitar (1–10), background vocals (5, 10)
- Jordan Mackay – drums (1–10), background vocals (5, 10)

Additional musicians

- Scotty Anderson – electric guitar (1–7, 9, 10), backing vocals (1, 2, 5, 6, 10), acoustic guitar (7, 8), piano (10)
- Callum Read – hand claps (2, 6)
- Gary Williamson – hard claps (2, 6), background vocals (7)
- Seonaid Aitken – violin (10)
- Freya Hall – violin (10)
- Emma Connell-Smith – viola (10)
- Pete Harvey – cello (10), arrangement (10)

Technical

- Jack Cochrane – producer (1–10)
- Scotty Anderson – producer (1–10), mixing
- Tony Hoffer – mixing
- Spike Stent – mixing
- Manny Marroquin – mixing
- Matt Colton – mastering
- Two Suns – artwork

== Charts ==
Chart performance for Millennials
Chart (2024)	Peak position
Scottish Albums (OCC)	1
UK Albums (OCC)	2
UK Independent Albums (OCC)	1
