= The Crack (magazine) =

British culture magazine

- Editor: Robert Meddes
- Categories: Entertainment
- Frequency: Monthly
- Founded: 1985
- Country: United Kingdom
- Language: English
- Website: http://www.thecrackmagazine.com

The Crack magazine is a free culture and listings magazine. The magazine was started in 1985. Published monthly in print and online, it covers entertainment and culture for the North East region of England. It provides comprehensive listings and previews on music, art, film, theatre, dance, comedy, gay-interest concerns and clubs, as well as articles relating to local fashion and local issues.

The Crack is available in the foyers of public spaces such as pubs, cafes, restaurants and shops and also in those of cultural venues such as galleries, libraries and cinemas.

Its office is in Heaton in Newcastle upon Tyne.
