= List of UK Rock & Metal Singles Chart number ones of 2024 =

The UK Rock & Metal Singles Chart is a record chart which ranks the best-selling rock and heavy metal songs in the United Kingdom. Compiled and published by the Official Charts Company, the data is based on each track's weekly physical sales and digital downloads . The first number one of the year was "Iris" by Goo Goo Dolls.

== Chart history ==
Issue date	Single	Artist(s)	Record label(s)	Ref.
5 January	"Iris"	Goo Goo Dolls	Warner	
12 January	"Kool-Aid"	Bring Me the Horizon	RCA	
19 January	"Iris"	Goo Goo Dolls	Warner	
26 January	"Iris"	Goo Goo Dolls	Warner	
2 February	"Iris"	Goo Goo Dolls	Warner	
9 February	"Iris"	Goo Goo Dolls	Warner	
16 February	"Iris"	Goo Goo Dolls	Warner	
23 February	"Iris"	Goo Goo Dolls	Warner	
1 March	"Iris"	Goo Goo Dolls	Warner	
8 March	"Iris"	Goo Goo Dolls	Warner	
15 March	"Iris"	Goo Goo Dolls	Warner	
22 March	"Iris"	Goo Goo Dolls	Warner	
29 March	"Iris"	Goo Goo Dolls	Warner	
5 April	"Iris"	Goo Goo Dolls	Warner	
12 April	"Iris"	Goo Goo Dolls	Warner	
19 April	"The Sound of Silence"	Disturbed	Reprise	
26 April	"The Sound of Silence"	Disturbed	Reprise	
3 May	"The Sound of Silence"	Disturbed	Reprise	
10 May	"The Sound of Silence"	Disturbed	Reprise	
17 May	"The Sound of Silence"	Disturbed	Reprise	
24 May	"The Sound of Silence"	Disturbed	Reprise	
31 May	"The Sound of Silence"	Disturbed	Reprise	
7 June	"Iris"	Goo Goo Dolls	Warner	
14 June	"Iris"	Goo Goo Dolls	Warner	
21 June	"Iris"	Goo Goo Dolls	Warner	
28 June	"Iris"	Goo Goo Dolls	Warner	
5 July	"Iris"	Goo Goo Dolls	Warner	
12 July	"Iris"	Goo Goo Dolls	Warner	
19 July	"Iris"	Goo Goo Dolls	Warner	
26 July	"Iris"	Goo Goo Dolls	Warner	
2 August	"Iris"	Goo Goo Dolls	Warner	
9 August	"Iris"	Goo Goo Dolls	Warner	
16 August	"Iris"	Goo Goo Dolls	Warner	
23 August	"Iris"	Goo Goo Dolls	Warner	
30 August	"Iris"	Goo Goo Dolls	Warner	
6 September	"Iris"	Goo Goo Dolls	Warner	
13 September	"The Emptiness Machine"	Linkin Park	Warner	
20 September	"The Emptiness Machine"	Linkin Park	Warner	
27 September	"The Emptiness Machine"	Linkin Park	Warner	
4 October	"The Emptiness Machine"	Linkin Park	Warner	
11 October	"The Emptiness Machine"	Linkin Park	Warner	
18 October	"Iris"	Goo Goo Dolls	Warner	
25 October	"Iris"	Goo Goo Dolls	Warner	
1 November	"Iris"	Goo Goo Dolls	Warner	
8 November	"Iris"	Goo Goo Dolls	Warner	
15 November	"Iris"	Goo Goo Dolls	Warner	
22 November ^{[b]}	"The Emptiness Machine"	Linkin Park	Warner	
29 November	"Iris"	Goo Goo Dolls	Warner	
6 December	"Iris"	Goo Goo Dolls	Warner	
13 December	"Iris"	Goo Goo Dolls	Warner	
20 December	"Iris"	Goo Goo Dolls	Warner	
27 December	"Iris"	Goo Goo Dolls	Warner	

== Notes ==
- ^{a} – The single was simultaneously number-one on the singles chart.
- ^{b} - The artist was simultaneously number one on the UK Rock & Metal Albums Chart.

== See also ==
- List of UK Rock & Metal Albums Chart number ones of 2024
