= Heavy Jelly =

Studio album by Soft Play
- Released: 19 July 2024
- Genre: Punk rock
- Length: 29:17
- Label: BMG
- Producer: Jolyon Thomas

Soft Play chronology
The Velvet Ditch (2019)	Heavy Jelly (2024)

Heavy Jelly is the fourth album by English punk rock duo Soft Play, released on 19 July 2024 through BMG Rights Management. It is their first album under the name Soft Play, having been known as Slaves until 2022. The album received universal acclaim from critics.

An extended version titled Heavier Jelly was released on 18 April 2025, containing six bonus tracks, including the title track.

== Critical reception ==
Professional ratings
Aggregate scores
Source	Rating
Metacritic	84/100
Review scores
Source	Rating
Clash	7/10
DIY	5/5 stars
The Guardian	4/5 stars
The Line of Best Fit	8/10

Heavy Jelly received a score of 84 out of 100 on review aggregator Metacritic based on five critics' reviews, which the website categorised as "universal acclaim". Robin Murray of Clash described it as "wilder, faster, heavier, more frenetic, and downright hilarious than anything they've done together before. Both cartoonish and extreme, it's a cycle of songs that are both heavy duty and utterly ridiculous." DIY's Lisa Wright called it "eleven tracks that condense everything brilliant about [Soft Play] in a manner that feels truly confident in its own idiosyncratic skin", with songs like "a snarling shout from the middle of mental health issues ('Isaac Is Typing...')" that sit "alongside a ridiculous ode to action hero 'John Wick' and a moving tribute to Isaac's recently-passed friend Bailey ('Everything and Nothing') in a way that somehow makes complete sense".

Rachel Aroesti of The Guardian characterised Heavy Jelly as "an album full of very harsh, relatively atonal punk-metal – a mode that can get monotonous. Still, the highlights of Heavy Jelly are enormous; despite the despair, Soft Play's future has never looked brighter". Reviewing the album for The Line of Best Fit, Steven Loftin wrote that "this new start feels fresh. Heavy Jelly could be the ravishing debut from some doe-eyed newcomers with the visceral energy they're touting this time around, except therein lies a hardened exterior."

== Track listing ==
All tracks are written by Isaac Holman, Laurence Vincent, and Jolyon Thomas. "All Things" written with Monk; "Everything and Nothing" written with Raven Bush.

Heavy Jelly track listing
No.	Title	Length
1.	"All Things"	2:43
2.	"Punk's Dead"	3:11
3.	"Act Violently"	2:51
4.	"Isaac Is Typing..."	2:44
5.	"Bin Juice Disaster"	1:55
6.	"Worms on Tarmac"	2:02
7.	"John Wick"	1:22
8.	"Mirror Muscles"	2:41
9.	"Working Title"	2:49
10.	"The Mushroom and the Swan"	3:02
11.	"Everything and Nothing"	3:57
Total length:		29:17

Heavier Jelly track listing
No.	Title	Length
12.	"Heavy Jelly"	2:36
13.	"Slushy" (featuring Kate Nash)	3:06
14.	"Flip Em the Bird"	3:00
15.	"Chairman of the Council"	3:45
16.	"Green Lamborghini"	1:26
17.	"Take Me to the Tip"	2:40
Total length:		45:59

== Personnel ==
Soft Play

- Isaac Holman – lead vocals (all tracks); drums, percussion, backing vocals (tracks 1–10)
- Laurie Vincent – electric guitar (all tracks); backing vocals (tracks 1, 3–10); programming, additional production (tracks 1, 4, 9); percussion (2), whistle (10); acoustic guitar, drums, mandolin, strings arrangement (11)

Additional contributors

- Jolyon Thomas – production, engineering (all tracks); synthesizer (tracks 1–10), programming (1, 3–10), guitar (1, 9, 11), acoustic guitar (2); drums, percussion (9); strings arrangement (11)
- Kevin Tuffy – engineering
- Erik Miles – engineering (tracks 2, 7–10)
- Owen Parker – engineering (track 2)
- Jason Stafford – studio assistance (tracks 1, 5, 7, 9–11)
- Robbie Williams – guest vocals (track 2)
- Raven Bush – violin, strings arrangement (track 11)
- Kate Nash – guest vocals (track 13)

== Charts ==
Chart performance for Heavy Jelly
Chart (2024)	Peak position
Scottish Albums (OCC)	1
UK Albums (OCC)	3
UK Independent Albums (OCC)	1
UK Rock & Metal Albums (OCC)	1
