= Soft Play =

English punk rock band

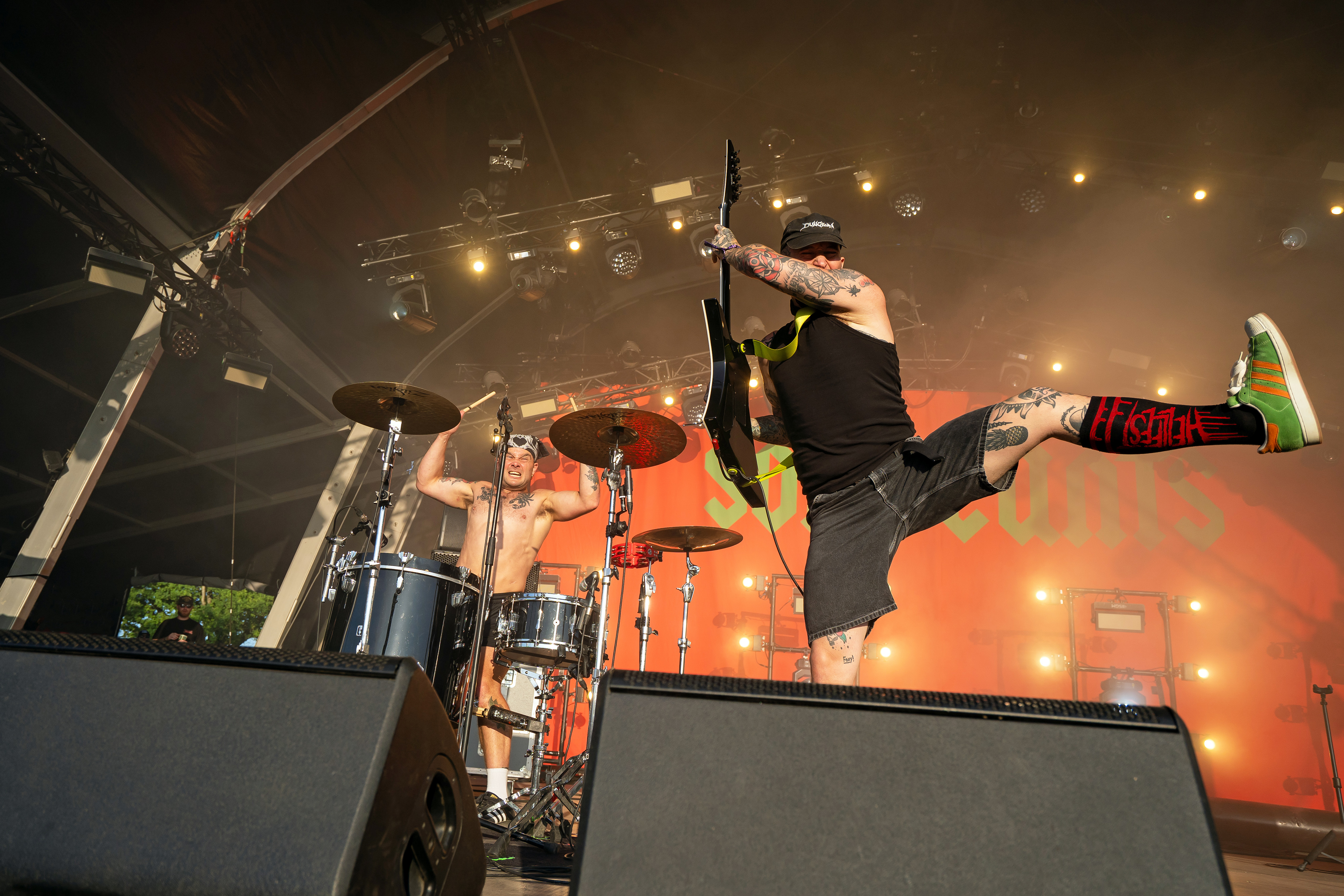
- Soft Play at Hellfest, 2025.

Background information
- Also known as: Slaves (2012–2022)
- Origin: Royal Tunbridge Wells, Kent, England
- Genres: Punk rock; hardcore punk
- Years active: 2012–present
- Labels: Virgin EMI; Boss Tuneage; Fonthill; Girl Fight; BMG
- Members: Isaac Holman; Laurie Vincent
- Website: softplayband.com

Soft Play (stylised in all caps), formerly known as Slaves, are an English punk rock duo formed by Isaac Holman (lead vocals, drums) and Laurie Vincent (backing vocals, guitar, bass) in Royal Tunbridge Wells in 2012.

== History ==
=== Sugar Coated Bitter Truth ===
As Slaves, the band released their first EP, Sugar Coated Bitter Truth, under Boss Tuneage Records in 2012. Their first single, "Where's Your Car Debbie?", was released by Fonthill Records in early 2014; they were then signed by Virgin EMI. They released their first single under Virgin, "Hey", in November 2014, and released "The Hunter" later that month. They gained more exposure in late 2015 when "The Hunter" was featured on the Sky One series You, Me and the Apocalypse. They also appeared on Later... with Jools Holland and were nominated for the BBC's Sound of 2015.

=== Are You Satisfied? ===
The duo released their debut album Are You Satisfied? on 1 June 2015. It reached No. 8 in its first week on the UK Albums Chart. The album was nominated for the 2015 Mercury Music Prize and has since gone Silver in the UK.

=== Take Control ===
They released their second album Take Control on 30 September 2016. Beastie Boys member Mike D produced the album, and was featured on the track "Consume or Be Consumed". The album fared better in the charts than the first, climbing to No. 6 in its first week on the UK Albums Chart.

=== Acts of Fear and Love ===
They released their third album Acts of Fear and Love on 17 August 2018, which reached number 8 on the UK album charts. In July 2019, the band released a four-track EP titled The Velvet Ditch and played a headline set at Truck Festival.

=== Name change and Heavy Jelly ===
The duo chose the name "Slaves" because they were both working menial jobs when they began playing together, describing it as a "reference to the grind of day-to-day life". In May 2015, The Fader featured the group in an article about provocative names for music artists. Vincent told The Fader that criticism of the name came as a surprise to them, stating that they came up with it while trying to think of "an abrasive sounding word, like Clash". He further said, "We just liked the word. We weren't trying to provoke." The two also addressed the controversy around their name in a statement on Facebook: "Our band name relates to people not being in control of their day to day lives. Slaves was our way of getting off the paths we didn't want to walk down anymore. The music we make is motivational and aimed at people personally as well as collectively."

In December 2022, the duo announced they would be changing their name to "Soft Play" and apologised to anyone who had been offended by the original name. Their fourth studio album (and first under their new name) Heavy Jelly was released on 19 July 2024.

== Discography ==
=== Studio albums ===
As Slaves

List of studio albums, with chart positions and certifications
Title	Details	Peak chart positions		Certifications
Title	Details	UK	SCO	Certifications
Are You Satisfied?	Released: 29 May 2015; Label: Virgin EMI; Formats: LP, CD, digital download	8	13	BPI: Gold
Take Control	Released: 30 September 2016; Label: Virgin EMI; Formats: LP, CD, digital download	6	9	
Acts of Fear and Love	Released: 17 August 2018; Label: Virgin EMI; Formats: LP, CD, digital download	8	8	

As Soft Play

List of studio albums as Soft Play, with selected details
Title	Details	Peak chart positions	
Title	Details	UK	SCO
Heavy Jelly	Released: 19 July 2024; Label: BMG; Formats: LP, CD, digital download	3	1

=== Extended plays ===
List of EPs, with selected details
Title	Details
Sugar Coated Bitter Truth	Released: 19 July 2012; Label: Girl Fight Records; Formats: CD, Digital download
The Velvet Ditch	Released: 18 July 2019; Label: Virgin EMI; Formats: Digital download

=== Singles ===
Title	Year	Album
As Slaves
"Where's Your Car Debbie?"	2014	Non-album single
"Hey"	2014	Are You Satisfied?
"The Hunter"	2014	Are You Satisfied?
"Feed the Mantaray"	2015	Are You Satisfied?
"Cheer Up London"	2015	Are You Satisfied?
"Sockets"	2015	Are You Satisfied?
"Spit It Out"	2016	Take Control
"Take Control"	2016	Take Control
"Cut and Run"	2018	Acts of Fear and Love
"Chokehold"	2018	Acts of Fear and Love
"Magnolia"	2018	Acts of Fear and Love
"One More Day Won't Hurt"	2020	The Velvet Ditch
As Soft Play
"Punk's Dead"	2023	Heavy Jelly
"Mirror Muscles"	2024	Heavy Jelly
"Act Violently"	2024	Heavy Jelly
"Everything and Nothing"	2024	Heavy Jelly
"Slushy (feat. Kate Nash)"	2025	Non-album single

==== As featured artist ====
Title	Year	Peak chart positions	Album
Title	Year	UK	Album
"Control" (Chase & Status featuring Slaves)	2016	–	Tribe
"Momentary Bliss" (Gorillaz featuring Slowthai & Slaves)	2020	58	Song Machine, Season One: Strange Timez
"—" denotes a recording that did not chart or was not released in that territory.

=== Songwriting and production credits ===
Title	Year	Artist(s)	Album	Contribution	Written with:	Produced with:
"Missing"	2019	Slowthai	Nothing Great About Britain	Co-writers; Co-producers	Tyron Frampton; Kwes Darko	Kwes Darko
