= Never Gonna Stop =

Never Gonna Stop may refer to:

- Never Gonna Stop (album), a 2000 album by Tommy Walker
- "Never Gonna Stop" (Rick Astley song), 2023
- "Never Gonna Stop (The Red Red Kroovy)", a promotional single by Rob Zombie
- "Never Gonna Stop", a 1978 song by Exile from Mixed Emotions, later covered by Linda Clifford on her 1979 album Here's My Love

== See also ==
- Never Stop (disambiguation)
