= Arcadia Spectacular =

British performance art collective

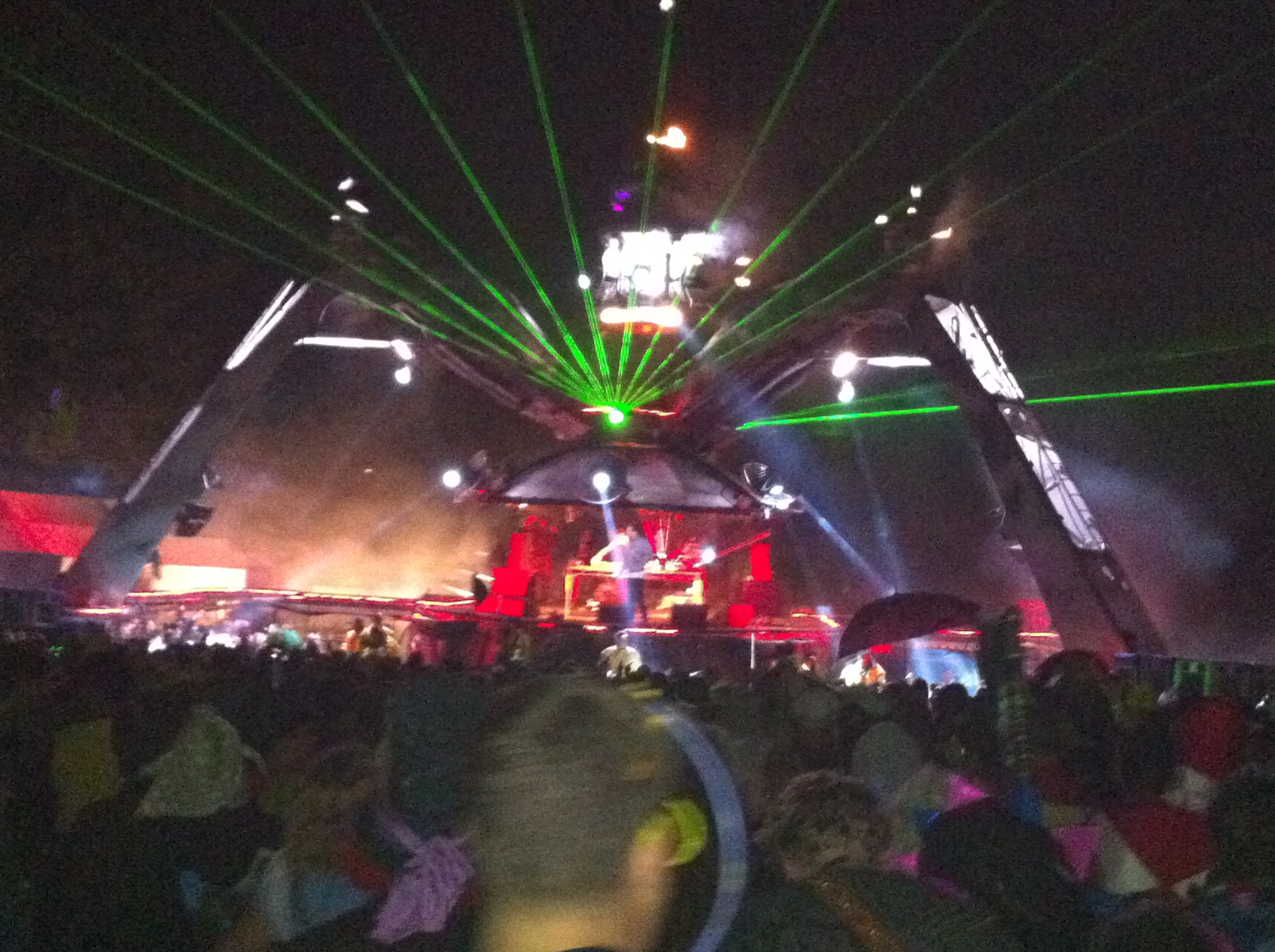
The Arcadia Spider at Bestival in 2010

Arcadia Spectacular, known colloquially as Arcadia, is a performance art collective that repurposes ex-military machinery, and other industrial components, into large scale high-capacity performance installations and dance music stages.

The group is often associated with Glastonbury Festival where they have had a permanent place since 2014, and hosted some of the biggest electronic artists and DJs including Fatboy Slim, Calvin Harris, Carl Cox, and The Chemical Brothers. Their installations have toured internationally, including previous appearances at Boomtown, Bestival, and Ultra Music Festival.

== History ==
The group was founded by Pip Rush who previously worked alongside his brother, artist Joe Rush, at the Mutoid Waste Company and Bert Cole, formerly master of the world's largest tent, the Valhalla.

Their first collaboration, the Afterburner, debuted at the Glastonbury Festival in 2007 after being built in a cowshed. Subsequent years of the festival saw the Afterburner's refinement until 2010 when three HM Customs and Excise scanning units were attached as legs, becoming the Spider. This first incarnation of the Spider stage led to two more years of adjustments until they became two separate installations. In 2012, the Spider became a permanent main stage at Boomtown.

In 2014, Arcadia were given a permanent area at the Glastonbury Festival, and exhibited at Boomtown for the last time. In 2014, The Afterburner was featured at Rhythm & Vines, New Zealand, and the new "Resistance" area at Ultra Music Festival, Miami in March 2015.

In September 2015, the Spider performed to 24,000 people over two nights in Queen Square, Bristol, at a celebration of the city as European Green Capital that year, where for the first time, the pyrotechnic flame system ran entirely on recycled biofuel.

In 2019, Arcadia launched Pangea at the Glastonbury Festival, a new stage centred around a re-purposed 140 ton dock crane, previously installed at Avonmouth Docks in Bristol, to 'take over the sky' above audiences.

At the 2024 Glastonbury Festival, the mainstay Spider stage was replaced by a new Dragonfly stage, repurposed from a former Royal Navy helicopter that was previously deployed in the Falklands War.

== Areas and performances ==
=== Spider ===
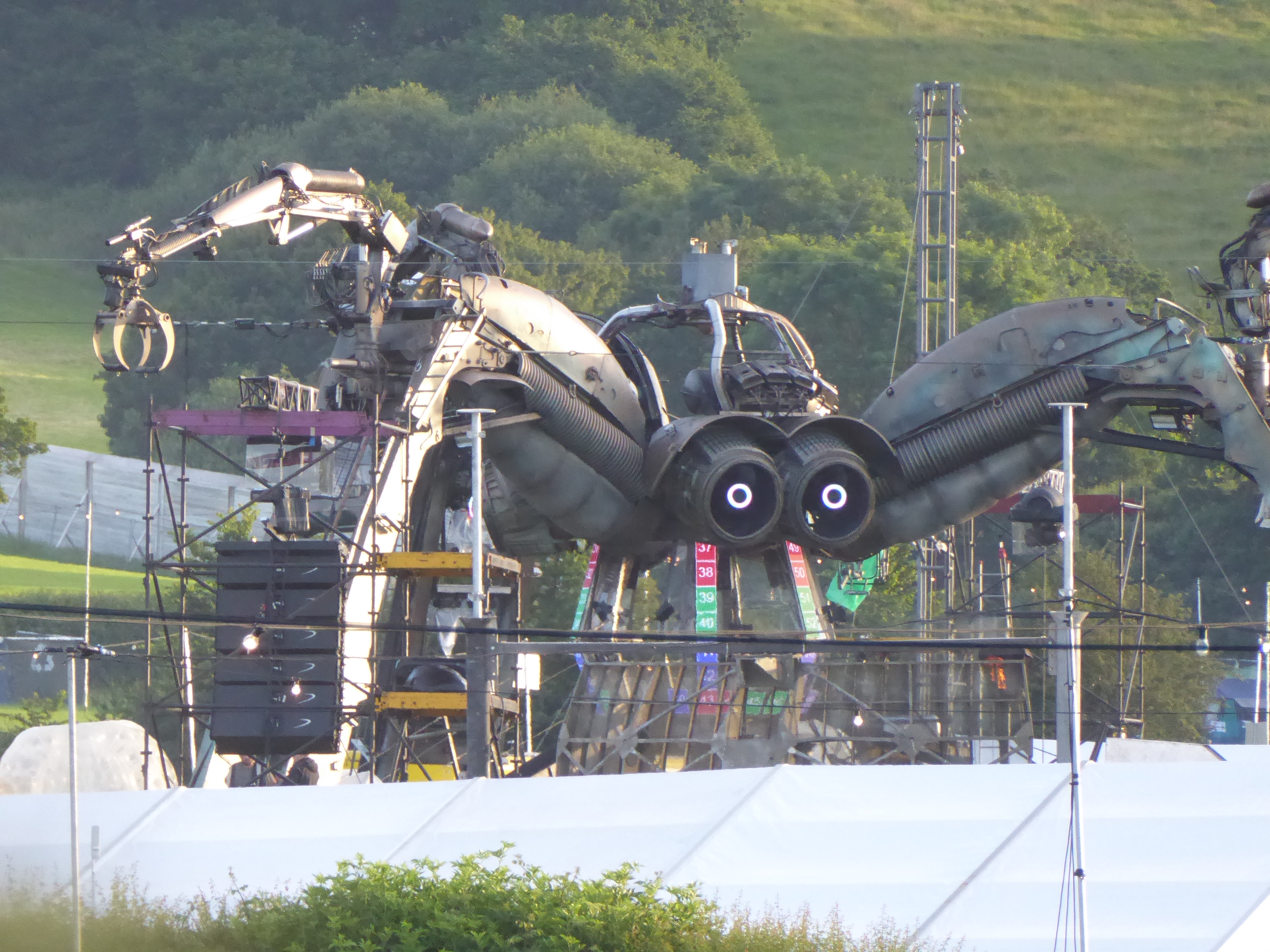
The Spider stage at Glastonbury 2016.

The Arcadia Spider is a 360 degree structure built from recycled materials. Its 'legs' are HM Customs and Excise scanning units, its 'eyes' are spy plane engines, its 'claws' are log grabbers, its 'body' is built from helicopter tails, and its DJ booth from jet engine blades. The DJ booth is suspended above the dancefloor. The Spider has several built in flame cannons able to shoot 50 foot flames, and is rigged with lights and lasers across its 'body'. Its 'arms' fire jets of CO_{2}, it is often given a 'skin' by video mapping and it is surrounded by a 360 degree sound field of PA speakers.

=== Pangea ===
Pangea is a 360 degree hemispherical stage with a re-purposed 140 tonne dock crane at its heart.

=== The Bug ===
The Bug is a 6 wheeled, amphibious stage built from submarine moulds and an Alvis Stalwart. The stage appeared at the closing ceremony of the 2012 Paralympics.
