= Frestonia =

Former micronation in London

Coordinates: 51°30′37.49″N 0°13′2.33″W

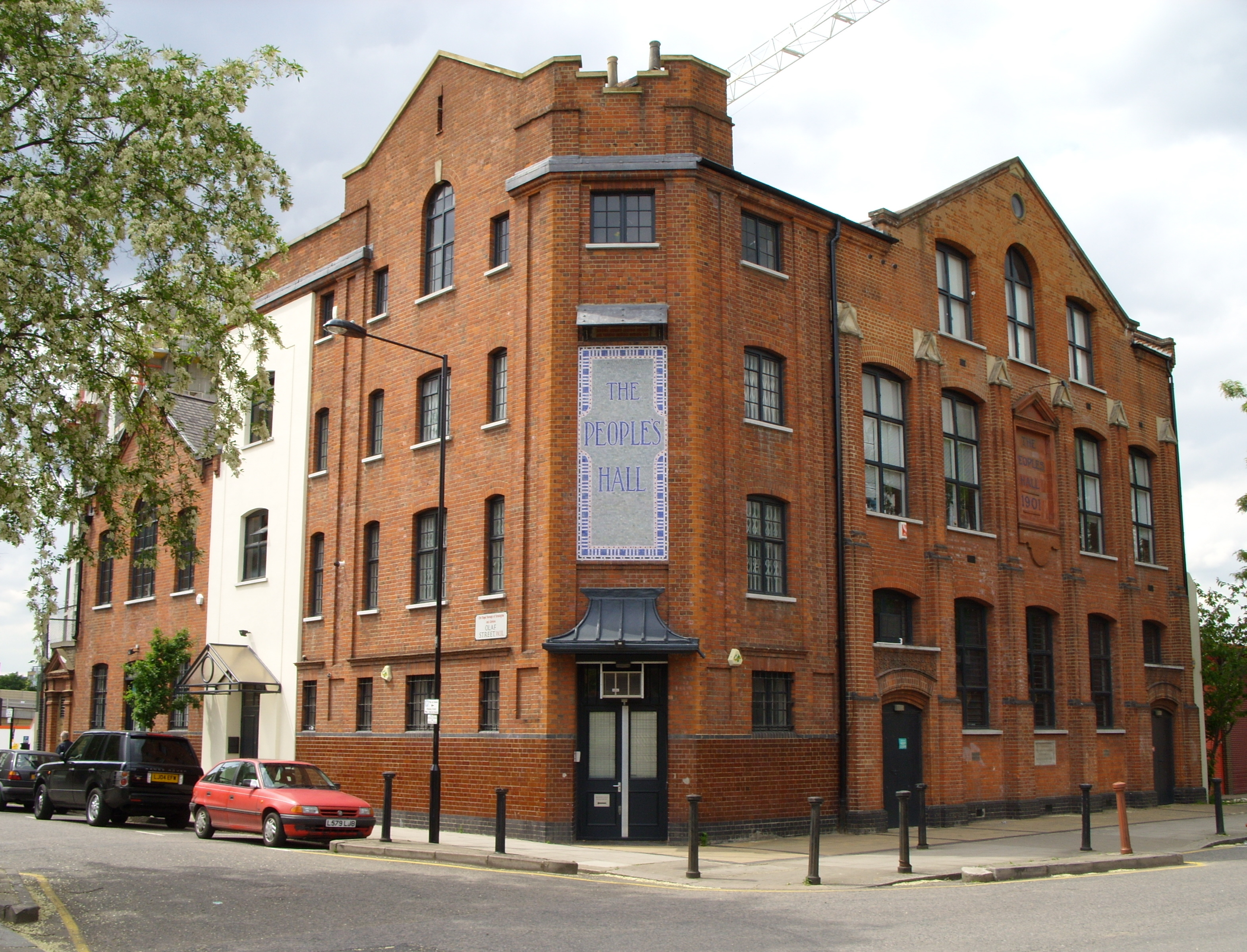
The People's Hall, Freston Road. This is the only significant building from the Frestonian squatting period still standing on Freston Road itself, and was home to a group of French punks. Eventually, when they moved on, the location was popular with creative outsiders drawn to the community. The building hosted the recording of much of The Clash's album Combat Rock

Frestonia was the name adopted for a couple of months by the squatters of Freston Road, London, when they attempted to stop a threatened eviction via secession from the United Kingdom. In 1974, two streets of tumbledown terraced Victorian cottages – Freston Road and Bramley Road – in the London Borough of Kensington and Chelsea, were broken into by squatters who rigged up electricity, water and makeshift roofs. They playfully formed the Free and Independent Republic of Frestonia and declared independence on 31 October 1977.

The residents were squatters, some of whom eventually set up a housing co-op in negotiation with Notting Hill Housing Trust after that landlord bought the street. Residents included artists, musicians, writers, actors and radical feminist activists.

Actor David Rappaport was the Foreign Minister, while playwright Heathcote Williams who occasionally visited a friend in the street, served as Ambassador to the United Kingdom.

== Location ==
Frestonia consisted of a 1.8-acre (0.73 ha) triangle of land (including communal gardens) formed by Freston Road, Bramley Road and Shalfleet Drive, W10, which belonged at the time to the London Borough of Hammersmith. This land crosses the boundary of London postal districts W10 (Kensal Green) and W11 (Notting Hill), and now belongs to the Royal Borough of Kensington and Chelsea.

Prior to the construction of the Westway, Freston Road had been called Latimer Road, and the nearby tube station still bears the former name.

== Origins ==
Most of the residents of Freston Road were squatters, who moved into empty houses in the early 1970s. The "Republic of Frestonia" continued to operate as a collective well into the 1980s, becoming a creative hub for writers, artists and musicians as well as cultural activists. When the Greater London Council planned to redevelop the area, the 120 residents first all adopted the same surname of Bramley with the aim that the council would then have to re-house them collectively.

== Independence ==
The Council threatened formal eviction, so at a public meeting attended by 200 people, resident Nicholas Albery—inspired by both the 1949 Ealing comedy film Passport to Pimlico and a previous visit to Freetown Christiania in Copenhagen—suggested that they declare the street independent of the rest of the UK. A referendum returned 94% of residents in favour of the plan, and 73% in favour of joining the European Economic Community. Independence was declared on 31 October 1977. Shadow Chancellor of the Exchequer Sir Geoffrey Howe wrote expressing his support, saying: "As one who had childhood enthusiasm for Napoleon of Notting Hill, I can hardly fail to be moved by your aspirations." In a legal dispute regarding the unauthorised performance of his play The Immortalist, Heathcote Williams won a ruling from the UK courts that Frestonia was for this purpose not part of the UK.

The state adopted the Latin motto Nos Sumus Una Familia—We are All One Family—and applied to join the United Nations, at the same time warning that peacekeeping troops might be needed to keep the GLC at bay.

== Culture, communications, transport and economy ==
Flag of Frestonia

Frestonia had its own flag; postage stamps (which were honoured by the General Post Office) in which the Queen was replaced with Gary the Gorilla; passport stamps for visitors; a national newspaper The Tribal Messenger; as well as an art gallery, The Car Breaker Gallery.

The Car Breaker Gallery's exhibitors included Joe Rush of the Mutoid Waste Company, Julie Umerle, Brett Ewins, Giles Leaman and Brendan McCarthy. The gallery opened to the public at 4 Bramley Road on 14 December 1979. In 1980, conceptual artist John Latham was a member of the audience at the private view of one of the performances presented there. Professional lighting for the gallery was donated by Sandy Nairne, later to be Director of the National Portrait Gallery.

Frestonia street art included a whale on Stoneleigh Street and a performance of Apocalypse Now on bicycles.

In addition, there was a "National Theatre" at Frestonia which performed Heathcote Williams's The Immortalist. The Frestonian National Film Institute was also formed; its first screening being Passport to Pimlico and a film of the Sex Pistols.

Local transport was served by the Number 295 bus, and the London Underground, Latimer Road underground station being at the north end of Bramley Road.

There were even plans to introduce a currency.

When the state celebrated its fifth anniversary in 1982, the population numbered 97 people occupying 23 houses. The same year, The Clash recorded their album Combat Rock in Ear Studios (also known as The People's Hall) in Frestonia. The Clash and Motörhead practised in the rehearsal studios there. Killing Joke and Girlschool also practised there.

== Decline and fall ==
Following international press coverage, the residents formed the Bramleys Housing Co-operative Ltd, which negotiated with Notting Hill Housing Trust for continued residence and acceptable redevelopment of the site. Some Frestonians were unhappy with the consequent loss of independence and moved away. According to Tony Sleep, a resident photographer whose online photo-journal documents the history of the area, those leaving were often replaced by people with drinking and drug problems. The remaining Frestonians proved incapable of maintaining the ideals of the Frestonian "nation", which consequently went into decline. In its place, a more conventional local community developed, without any claims to secession from the UK.

== 21st century situation ==
As of 2016, Bramleys Housing Co-operative manages the properties owned and built on the Frestonia site by Notting Hill Housing Trust, and its members live as a close-knit community. Some are children or grandchildren of the original Frestonians, although there has also been a significant influx of new residents.

A large new office development, also named Frestonia, was built on the adjacent site at the junction of Bramley Road and St Anns Road, and is occupied by the headquarters of Cath Kidston. In 2001, a second large office development also named Frestonia by its developers was erected at 125/135 Freston Road.

In 2006, the Louise T Blouin Foundation was built in nearby Olaf Street. The nearby 150,000 m^{2} Westfield London shopping complex opened in 2008.

Major developments occurred in 2007 with the completion of headquarters for Monsoon Accessorize and TalkTalk (2009) at the rear of 91–121 Freston Road.

In 2010, a series of buildings were constructed on the site of Frestonia which were named Notting Dale Campus, to be used as creative work spaces in recognition of Frestonia's bohemian art heritage.

== Cultural reactions ==
- 1978. Simon Watters-Bramley, Frestonian Ambassador to Canada, the Arctic and Chicago, was featured on the cover of Salty Dog magazine (Vol. I, issue No. 2) an arts and culture tabloid newspaper published by Joanne Light in Wolfville, Nova Scotia, Canada where he resided at his ambassadorial residence before leaving his post to work for Greenpeace.
- 1995. Frestonia was the name of the final album from Aztec Camera.
- 2014. Robert Kerr won best Screenplay (UK) for his debut documentary The Republic of Frestonia at the 11th London Independent Film Festival.
- 2015. To the Bramley Family of Frestonia. A publication documenting the public art project in London by Turner Prize nominee Nathan Coley with an introduction by art critic, writer and curator Sacha Craddock.
- 2015. Arcadia. An article by Robert Barry, viewing Frestonia as the forefathers of Arcadia Spectacular.
- 2016. Robert Kerr's documentary The Republic of Frestonia was shortlisted for a Golden Trellick Award at the Portobello Film Festival.
- 2017. The Frestonian Gallery opened at The People's Hall. The Frestonian Gallery seeks to channel the independence of thought and expression of its rebel forebears.
- 2018. Welcome To Frestonia by Tony Sleep. Publisher: Frestonian Gallery. ISBN 978-1-9996146-0-7
- 2020. Kensington and Chelsea Art Week commission a mural to be painted on a large hoarding on Freston Road to commemorate the history of the area.
- 2021. The musical Ruff Tuff Cream Puff Estate Agency based on the story and events of Freston was created and premiered at the Belgrade Theatre, Coventry.
- 2025. A reading of Heathcote Williams' documentary play about Frestonia opened the Portobello Winter Film & Art Festival.

== See also ==
- List of micronations
