= Mutoid =

Mutoid may refer to:

- Mutoids, cybernetically-enhanced humans from sci-fi TV series Blake's 7.
- Mutoid Waste Company, London rave promoters of the 1980s.
- Mutoid Man, American rock band formed in 2012 in Brooklyn, New York.
