= Boomtown (festival) =

Immersive music festival near Winchester, England

Boomtown Fair

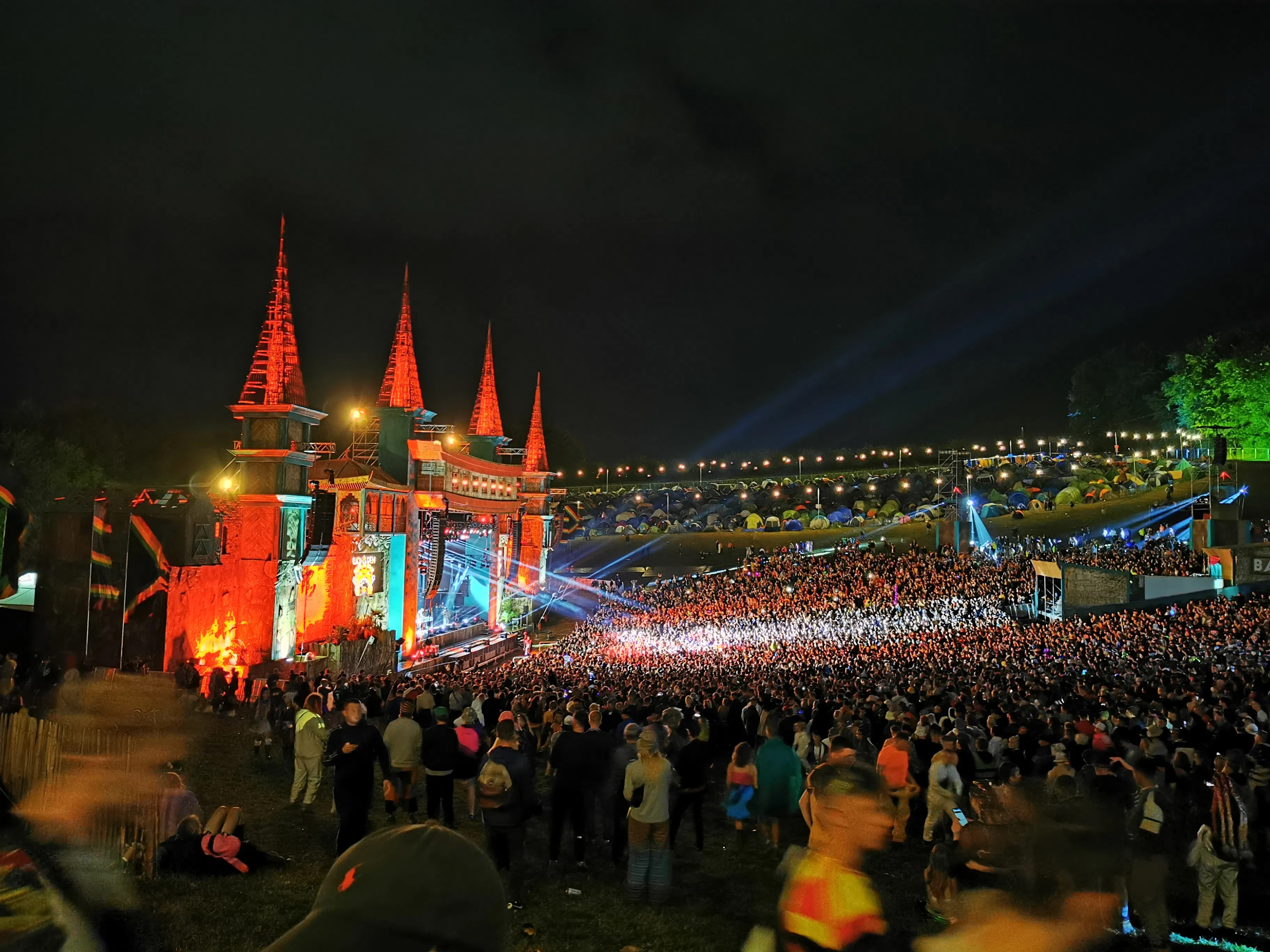
- The Lion's Den stage at night during Boomtown Chapter 11 (2019)
- Genre: Music and theatre production
- Frequency: Annually
- Locations: Matterley Estate, Alresford Road, near Winchester, Hampshire, England.
- Coordinates: 51°03′05″N 01°14′44″W
- Years active: 17 years
- Inaugurated: 7 August 2009
- Founders: Chris Rutherford; Luke 'Lak' Mitchell
- Most recent: 12 August 2026 – 16 August 2026
- Next event: 11 August 2027 – 15 August 2027
- Participants: 70,000-79,999
- Capacity: 79,999 (2026)
- Organiser: Boomtown Festival UK Ltd.
- Website: www.boomtownfair.co.uk

Boomtown (also known as Boomtown Fair) is a five-day theatre and music festival held annually on the Matterley Estate in South Downs National Park, near Winchester in Hampshire, England. It was first held in 2009 and has been held at its current site since 2011. The event runs in the second week of August each year, and features a diverse lineup of live bands, electronic music DJs, speakers, and other performers across a wide range of genres.

Boomtown takes place on 1,250 acres of farmland, and consists of 8 districts of a fictional city, alongside camping, workshop, and activist areas. Each district has a distinct identity and is constructed with life-sized street sets, housing more than 50 hidden venues run by independent collectives and record labels, with some resembling typical amenities including a post office, hotel, and police station. The 12 large main stages are run by Boomtown, and several stages are situated within woodland, with permanent wooden staging, bars, and walkway structures. The large scale of the build and its infrastructure requires six weeks of construction, and a month of disassembly.

In addition to music, each edition of the festival features heavy immersive theatre elements, expanding on an overarching narrative through a large alternate reality game, and serving as social commentary. Attendees can interact with actors portraying citizens of the fictional city and obtain copies of the festival’s in-universe newspaper, The Daily Rag, which is published throughout the event. The storyline climaxes in the festival’s closing ceremony on Sunday night. Previous years have included themes of artificial intelligence, media manipulation, political corruption, and the environment.

== History ==
=== 2009-2016: Boomtown Begins ===
Boomtown Fair was created when Rutherford and Mitchell, who had grown up in the festival and free party scenes, decided that music festivals lacked atmosphere, and that many genres were being overlooked. The first chapter, Boomtown Begins, took place from 7-9 August 2009 and was held at the Speech House Hotel in Coleford, Gloucestershire. It was a successor to their first festival held the previous year Recydrate The West, which was predominately a ska and cider festival.

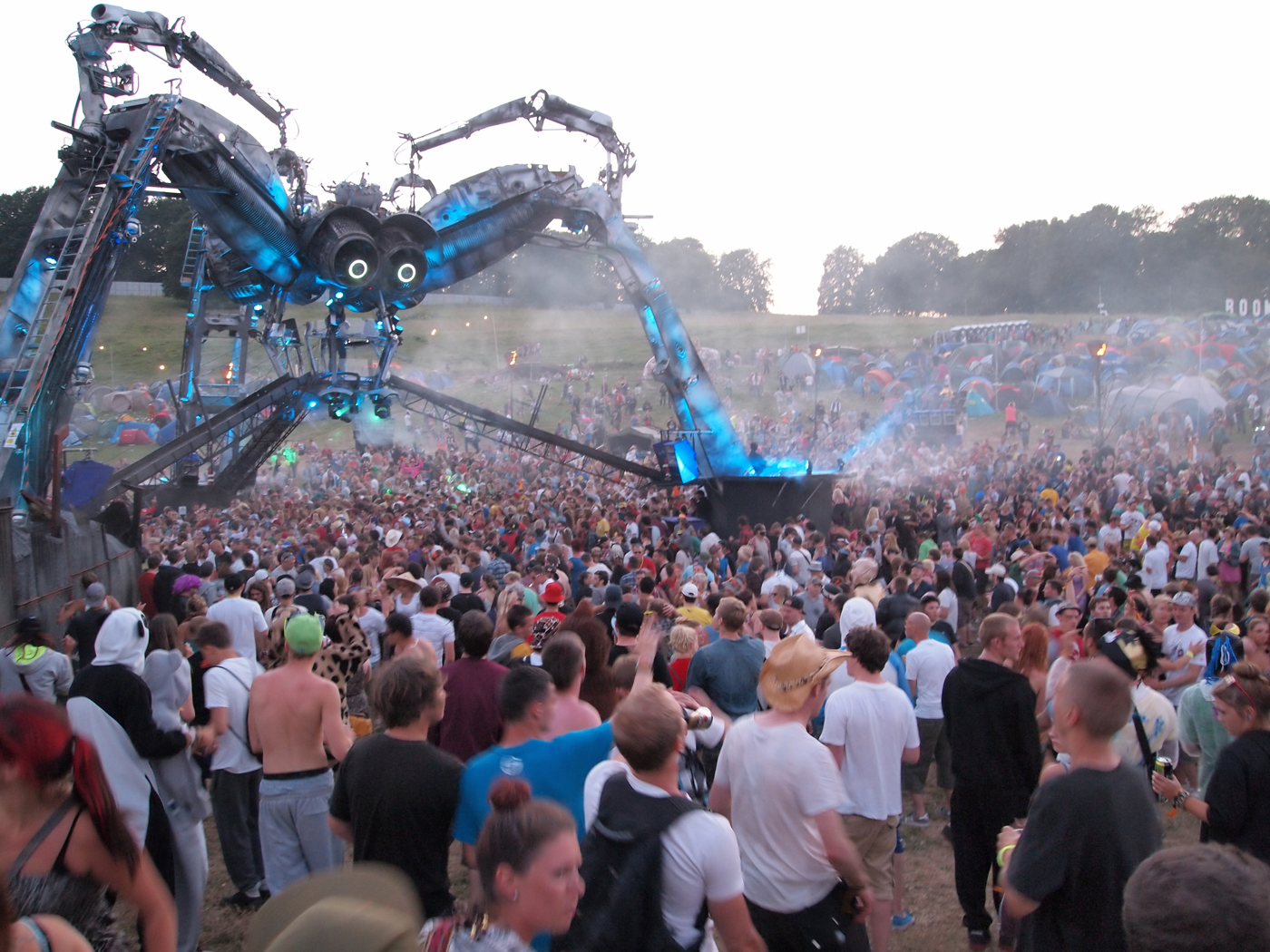
Arcadia stage at Boomtown 2012

In its second year, the festival moved to the Stowe Landscape Gardens in Buckingham, Buckinghamshire, before finally relocating in 2011 to the Matterley Estate in Winchester, where it has remained ever since.

Between 2012 and 2014, the Arcadia Spider featured as a main dance stage, before being replaced by the custom Banghai Palace in 2015. In 2015, the Lion's Den stage was moved to a large natural amphitheatre bowl to accommodate the largest crowds of any stage at the festival. The 2016 fair saw further expansion with Sector 6 across from Lion's Den in Temple Valley, introduced to even the spread of bass-heavy music across the site. The same year, a discarded cigarette caused a fire in a car park field, destroying more than 80 cars.

=== 2017-2019: A Major Festival ===
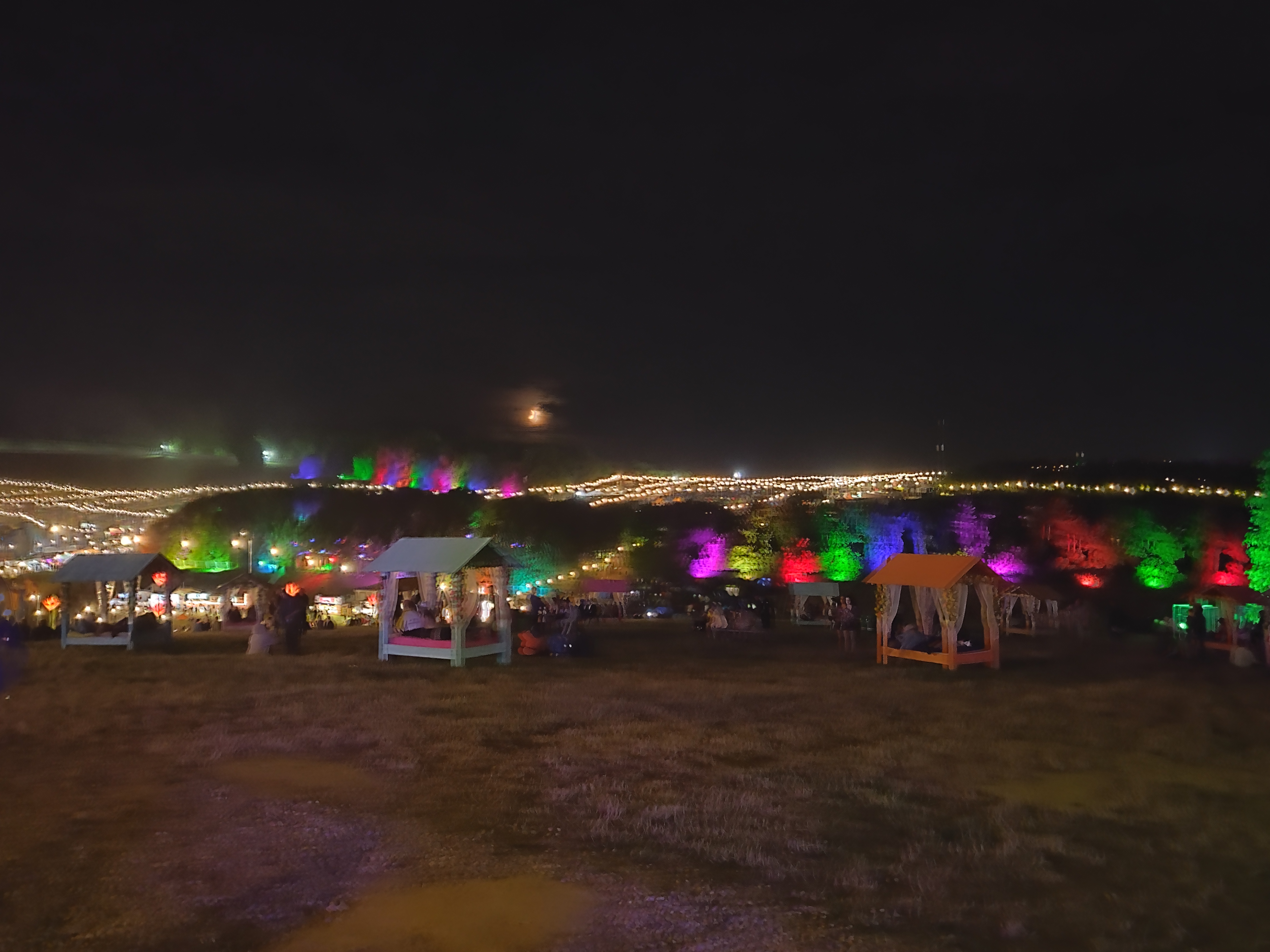
Hippie Highway, a central route through the site, at night in 2019

In the weeks leading up to the 2017 event, the construction of the city was hampered by bad weather, which contributed to delays at the gates, with some guests queuing for up to 10 hours to enter the site. The rest of the event proceeded without incident.

In 2018, organisers applied to increase the capacity of the festival to 80,000 but the application was rejected after concerns from locals around strain on the transport system. Instead, they were granted an increase to 60,000, and allowed to open a day early, providing attendees used sustainable transport methods - coaches, shuttle bus, or cars with more than three people. The same year, the festival saw its first major headliner, Gorillaz in a UK-exclusive show.

The 2019 fair introduced the new Area 404 district in place of Sector 6 providing a dedicated zone for techno and acid house music. The event was focused around the "Leave No Trace" mantra. Encouraging attendees to take their rubbish and camping equipment with them as they leave, and banning single-use plastics from all on-site merchants. As a result of this push, the festival saw a 50% reduction in tents and equipment left behind by attendees.

In 2019, the festival saw very high winds. The Relic main-stage stage was closed during a performance by Shy FX after a piece of debris from the stage was blown onto the crowd. All subsequent acts that day were moved to the Lion's Den stage. The Relic stage re-opened the next day. No injuries were reported.

==== COVID-19 Pandemic ====
The 2020 event was cancelled due to the COVID-19 pandemic. The following year, after an announcement from Prime Minister Boris Johnson on 25 February 2021 announcing the roadmap for the removal of restrictions in England, public confidence in the 2021 festival season increased. Following this news, many festivals in the UK saw a huge increase in ticket sales, with the organizers of the Reading and Leeds festivals stating they were 'very confident' the summer's events would go ahead. By Thursday 25 February, all remaining Boomtown tickets had sold out; 48,000 in total.

However, on 20 April 2021, Boomtown announced its cancellation for the second year in a row. Organisers cited the lack of a government insurance scheme to cover COVID-19-related risks for music festivals, stating that "for an independent event as large and complex as Boomtown, this means a huge gamble into an eight-figure sum to lose if we were to venture much further forward, and then not be able to go ahead due to COVID." The organisers planned to hold a smaller event known as Boom Village, but was cancelled due to safety concerns over rising numbers of new COVID-19 cases.

As a result of cancellations from the COVID-19 pandemic, the festival corporation's total equity had dropped from more than £2.1 million in October 2019 to just £151,879 in October 2021.

=== 2022-present: Recovery and re-expansion ===
The festival returned in 2022 with a reset chapter number and a vastly condensed layout, with 8 districts (reduced from 14) and 12 main stages (reduced from 25). The majority of entertainment was moved into the bowl, with the campsites onto the flat land surrounding. Two new flagship main stages were introduced, Origin as the main dance stage, and Grand Central as the main live music stage, with the previously-largest-main-stages not returning. The festival also adopted a lineup policy whereby most performers were announced only days before the event, this coincided with a drop of typical headliner bookings.

The 2022 fair took place during a period of extreme heat in the United Kingdom, with temperatures forecast to reach 38°C. The dry conditions made the site extremely dusty, and many attendees wore face coverings such as bandanas. The dust caused many attendees to develop a cough, which became colloquially known as 'boomlung'.

On 17 August 2022, co-founders Luke Mitchell and Christopher Rutherford confirmed that the festival, previously the largest wholly independent festival in the UK, had sold a 45% stake to a company jointly owned by Live Nation, Gaiety Investments and SJM Concerts, citing financial pressure following the pandemic. Trade press reported the split as 18% to Live Nation, 18% to Gaiety and 9% to SJM.

On 29 June 2023, for the 15th anniversary of the festival, Boomtown announced The Prodigy would be headlining the fair on Sunday, the first headline announcement since the change in policy. However, the Friday during the festival, the band cancelled all upcoming performances after vocalist Maxim suffered a back injury. The Prodigy was replaced by Chase and Status.

On 6 December 2024, Boomtown launched the 2025 event with a return to lineup announcements in advance, with a first-wave of artists, and announcing the first re-expansion outside of the bowl. The Old Town district moving to Hilltop, and the introduction of two new main dance stages: The Lions Gate (replacing Origin), and a new fully-hydrogen powered stage Hydro for techno and house music, a first for a major UK festival. The event also included the reintroduction of a single wellness and spiritual healing area Thrutopia, with speakers, traders, and workshops, and a large communal fire pit.

In April and May 2025 the ownership of Boomtown's parent company changed. UK Festival Holdings, a subsidiary of Live Nation (Music) UK, took over the 80% holding in LNGSJM Holdco, and on 15 May 2025 bought a further 5.1% of Circus of Boom directly from the founders. Two further directors were appointed to the Circus of Boom board the same day (see Ownership).

In June 2025, the festival was granted 1-year approval from the South Downs National Park Authority to expand capacity from 65,999 to 76,999, bringing capacity in line with their existing license from Winchester City Council. The plans included a planned reduction in crew from 17,999 to 12,999, citing efficiencies, and an increase in ticket-holders by 15,000.

On 1 October 2025, Boomtown launched Chapter 5: Radical Redesign, marking a return to the festival's larger, pre-pandemic footprint after four years largely condensed within the bowl. The redesign introduced several major changes, including the return of the Lion's Den stage, a 150% expansion of the hydrogen-powered Hydro XL stage into a new flagship stage, and the relocation of Grand Central to Hilltop. The festival also announced a shift in programming, moving away from a recent emphasis on bass-heavy genres towards a more diverse offering, and a greater number of live bands.

Chapter 5, titled Radical Redesign, took place from 12 to 16 August 2026. The festival returned to a larger site layout, with the reintroduction of the Lion's Den stage and the introduction of the expanded Hydro XL stage. The 2026 edition also featured a more diverse musical programme, with artists including Skrillex, Kneecap, Madness, Scissor Sisters, Faithless and Four Tet.

In April 2026, the South Downs planning authority unanimously approved the festival's continuation through to 2030. For the 2026 event, Boomtown announced a UK-first academic research hub integrated into a major music festival, to explore social interaction and the impact of shared cultural events.

== Layout ==
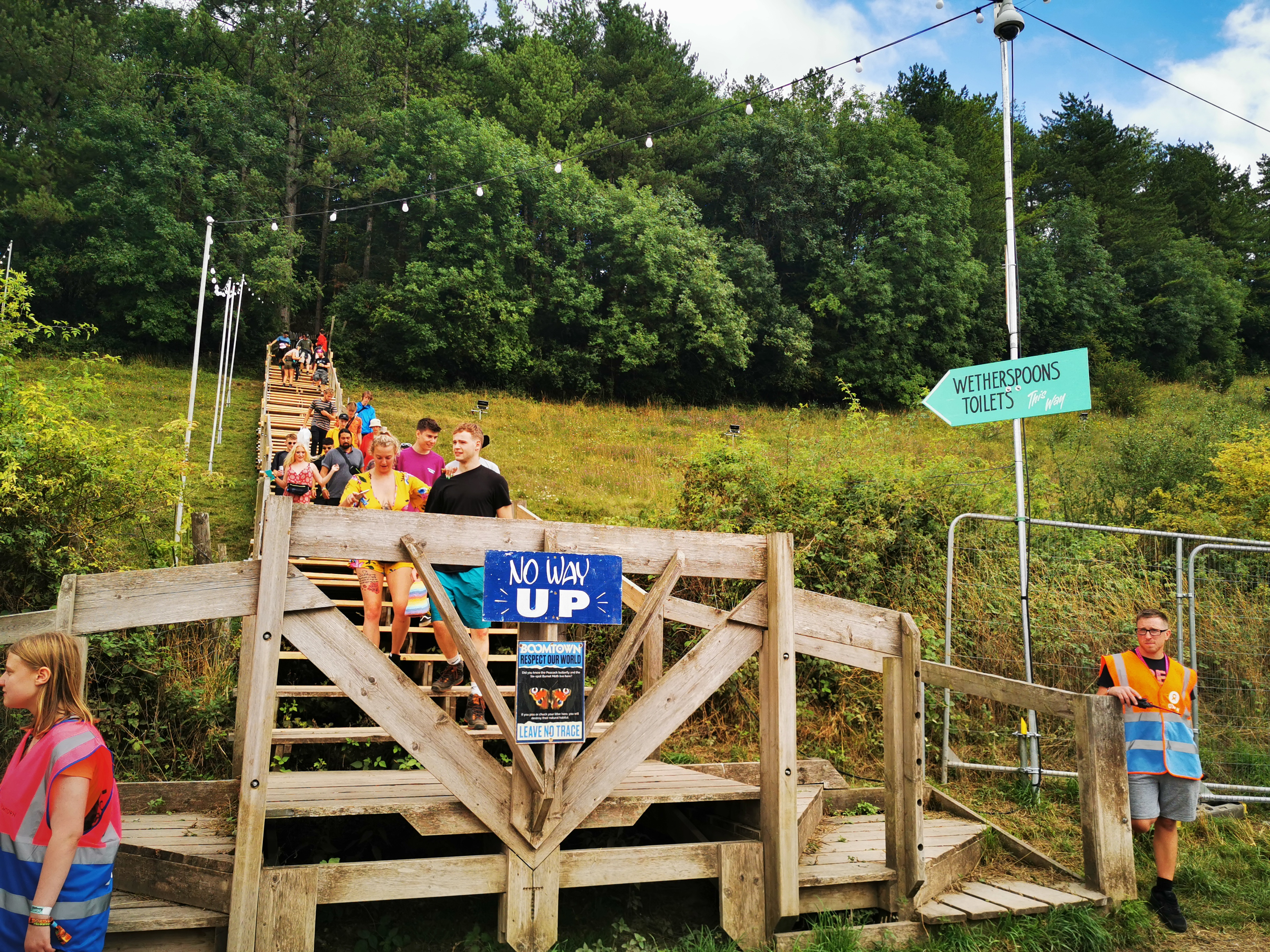
The bottom of The Stairs, a route between Downtown and Hilltop

The 1,250 acre greenfield festival site is split into a few main areas:

- the Downtown area contained within Cheesefoot Head;
- the Temple Valley valley which splits the site diagonally;
- and the Hilltop area which extends across the crest of the hill that is the mid-ground between these two areas – it is also the geographical centre of the site.

The main entertainment is contained within the Downtown and Hilltop areas with attendees taking either Hippie Highway (a large, steep hill) or The Stairs (a temporary staircase structure) to travel between the two.

Each of the 8 districts has a distinct identity, with unique set design and music genres on show. Each district has at least one main stage, alongside small and medium size venues integrated into the street sets. The festival contains 12 main stages and 50 additional hidden venues.

The largest main stages (Lion's Den, Hydro XL, and Grand Central) differ from the others as they are designed to accommodate crowds in the tens of thousands, with vast stage sets at the centre with bars, toilets, and accessible viewing platforms around the area.

A number of stages feature within the natural features of the sites. The 'forest party' stages are set within the woods under tree canopies, with sand flooring and large permanent wooden structures. The Lions Den stage is also set within a large natural amphitheatre.

Almost all of the site accessible to the public that is not part of the entertainment area is used for camping, with no barriers or further security between camping areas and stages.

The two main entrances are on the far east and west sides of the site for those travelling by car and public transport respectively. On the south side of the site is the entrance for camper vans along with the camper van field. The north side and north-east corner of the site is primarily out of bounds staff and crew areas.

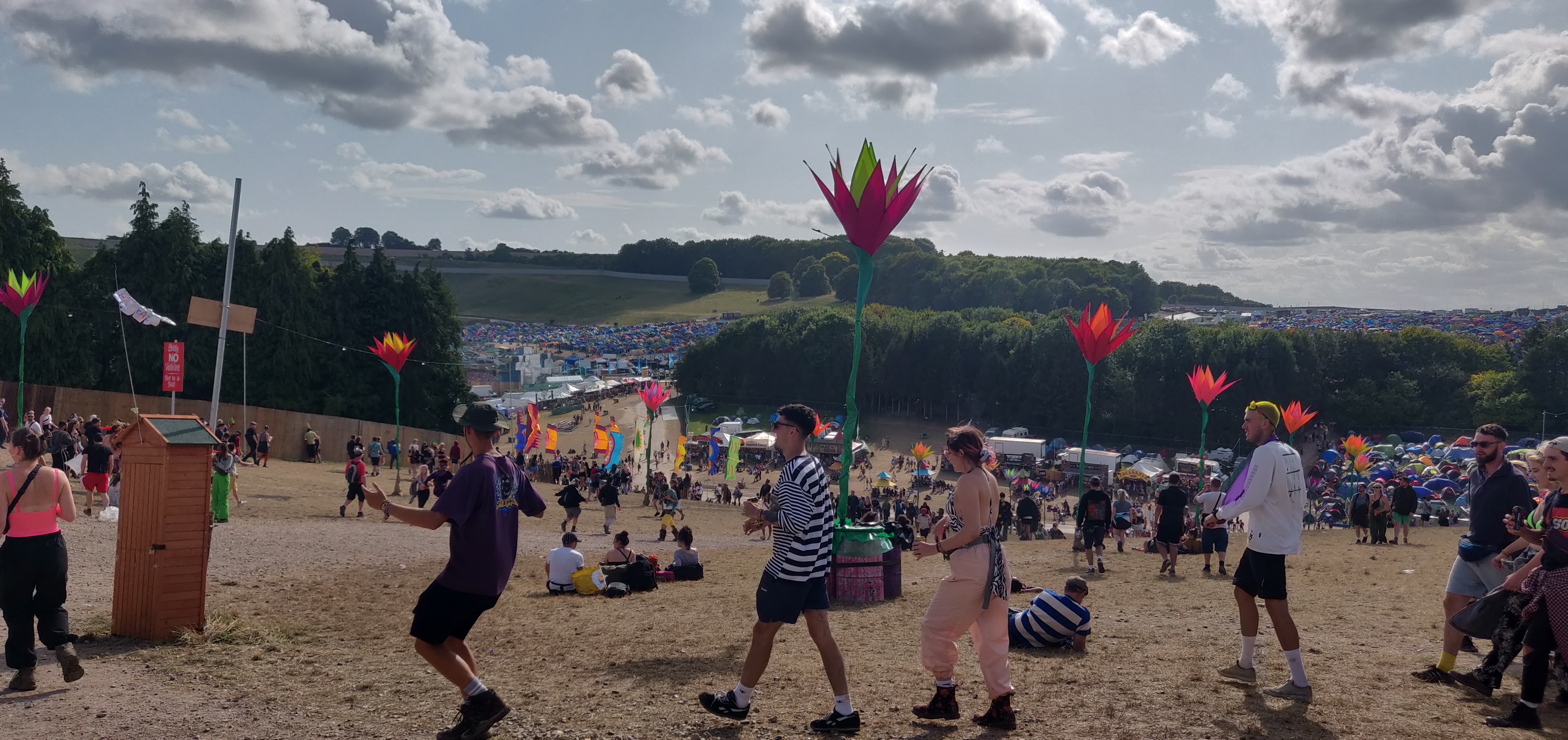
View from the top of Hippie Highway, the main route between the areas of Downtown and Hilltop (2019)

== Location ==
Map showing the location of Boomtown within Hampshire.

The festival takes place in South East England on the Matterley Estate in Hampshire on the grounds of the South Downs National Park, 3 miles from Winchester. The grounds are situated between the A31 and A272, at grid reference SU 52919 28297.

The grounds have been the home of a number of music festivals and concerts over the years, including Creamfields in its inaugural year of 1998, Homelands from 1999 till 2005 and Glade Festival in 2009. Given the long history of a number of iconic events, particularly during the rise of electronic dance music, the land is firmly associated with the scene.

Elsewhere on-site, the motocross track within the Matterley Basin has in the past held the British round of the World Championship, as well as the Motocross of Nations. The site has also hosted the Tough Mudder endurance test series.

== Ownership ==
Boomtown is run by Boomtown Festival UK Ltd, which is wholly owned by Circus of Boom Ltd.

In July 2022 the founders sold 45% of Circus of Boom to three music companies: Live Nation (18%), Gaiety (18%) and SJM (9%). The three held their stakes through one holding company, LNGSJM Holdco Ltd. When it was set up, 80% of LNGSJM Holdco belonged to LN-Gaiety Holdings Ltd, a Live Nation and Gaiety company, and 20% to SJM.

In April 2025 that 80% passed to UK Festival Holdings Ltd, which is wholly owned by Live Nation's UK business. In May 2025 UK Festival Holdings also bought 5.1% of Circus of Boom directly from the founders.

Under Circus of Boom's articles of association, investors holding more than 50% of the company can appoint two additional directors. Selina Emeny and Lynn Lavelle, both directors of UK Festival Holdings, were appointed to the board on 15 May 2025, the day the investors' holding reached 50.1%. Four of the board's seven directors are now Live Nation UK executives or directors of UK Festival Holdings: Denis Desmond, Stuart Douglas, Selina Emeny and Lynn Lavelle. The articles provide that the board makes decisions by majority vote.

Shareholders of Circus of Boom as of September 2025
Shareholder	Share	Itself owned by
LNGSJM Holdco	45%	UK Festival Holdings (80%), SJM Holdings North (20%)
UK Festival Holdings	5.1%	Live Nation (Music) UK (100%)
Christopher Rutherford	24.95%	–
Luke Mitchell	24.95%	–

== Transport ==
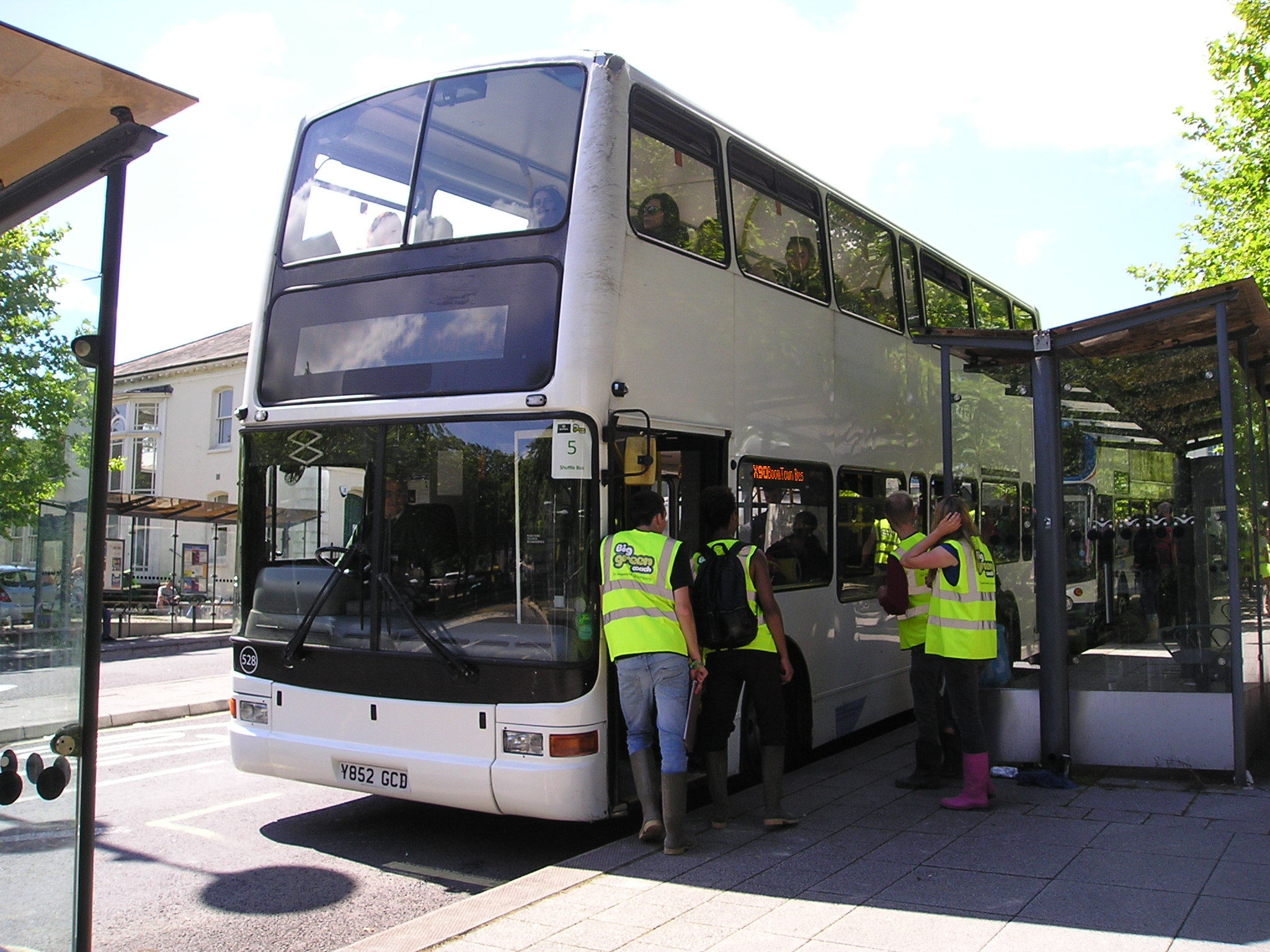
Shuttle bus to the festival from Winchester station, operated by Xelabus

Tickets are split between Wednesday and Thursday entry, staggered to help reduce strain on the transport system. Discounted entry tickets are available for those arriving via sustainable modes of transport, and include Wednesday-entry for free. In 2018, 35% of attendees arrived by coach or train.

The nearest railway station to the site is Winchester, with frequent shuttle buses running to a temporary bus station on-site. National Express provides direct coach services to the site from 50+ UK cities, coach travel has doubled since 2013 under the festival’s green transport schemes.

Car parking is available on site, with £1 from each parking pass funding renewable energy projects, and car sharing heavily encouraged. Cycling is also supported, including with guided cycling tours available from Bristol and London.

== Summary by year ==
Year	Title	Dates	Notable acts	Ticket price
2009	Chapter 1 Boomtown Begins	7–9 August	Chas and Dave, Sonic Boom Six, Iration Steppas, Dub FX	£49
2010	Chapter 2 External Forces	13–15 August	Toots And The Maytals, The Wurzels, General Levy, Bad Manners, Roddy Radiation (The Specials), Gentleman's Dub Club, David Rodigan, Dub Pistols	£74
2011	Chapter 3 The Disappearance of Boom	11–14 August	Gogol Bordello, DJ Zinc, Ms. Dynamite, Barrington Levy, Congo Natty, Gentleman's Dub Club, Toddla T, Cutty Ranks	£93
2012	Chapter 4 An Alien Presence	9–12 August	Reel Big Fish, Caravan Palace, Shy FX, Dub Pistols, Sonic Boom 6, SL2	£129
2013	Chapter 5 Declaration of Democracy	8–11 August	Foreign Beggars, Toots and the Maytals, Mad Caddies, Arrested Development, The Parov Stelar Band, Ozomatli, Richie Spice, Dub Inc, Collie Buddz, Redlight, Digital Mystiks, Koan Sound, Calyx & Teebee	£159
2014	Chapter 6 The Loopholes of Time	7–10 August	The Cat Empire, General Levy, Chas & Dave, NOFX, Jimmy Cliff, The Wailers, Raggasonic, My Nu Leng, Hot 8 Brass Band, Bellowhead	£160
2015	Chapter 7 The Palace Has Risen	13–16 August	Stephen Marley, Protoje, Noisia, Matisyahu, Flogging Molly, Gogol Bordello, Less Than Jake, Streetlight Manifesto, Caravan Palace, Barrington Levy, Mr. Scruff	£165
2016	Chapter 8 The Revolution Starts Now	11–14 August	Madness, Damian Marley, Leftfield, Fat Freddy's Drop, Parov Stellar, Levellers, MJ Cole, Roni Size, Skream, Nightmares on Wax, Jackmaster, Chris Lorenzo, Congo Natty, The Skints	£180
2017	Chapter 9 Behind The Mask	10–13 August	The Specials, M.I.A., Cypress Hill, Ziggy Marley, Skindred, Altern 8, Shy FX, Utah Saints, Reel Big Fish, The Wurzels, DJ Luck & MC Neat, Ray Keith, Slipmatt, Redlight, Black Sun Empire	£205
2018	Chapter 10; The Machine Cannot Be Stopped	8–12 August	Gorillaz, Die Antwoord, Limp Bizkit, Enter Shikari, Soul II Soul, Goldie, Spice, Shy FX, Maribou State, Ben Harper & The Innocent Criminals, Sleaford Mods, Billy Bragg	£246
2019	Chapter 11; A Radical City	7–11 August	Lauryn Hill, Prophets of Rage, The Streets, Chronixx, Chase & Status, Groove Armada	£254
2020 (Note: The 2020 edition was cancelled due to the COVID-19 pandemic.)	Chapter 12; New Beginnings	12–16 August	Wu-Tang Clan, Underworld, Kelis, Pendulum Trinity	£274
2022	Chapter 1 The Gathering	10-14 August	Four Tet, Noisia, Kool and the Gang, Sherelle, Squarepusher, De La Soul, Koffee	£265
2023	Chapter 2 The Twin Trail	9-13 August	The Prodigy (cancelled, replaced by Chase & Status), Cypress Hill, Sister Sledge, Sub Focus, Leftfield, Beenie Man, Confidence Man	£315
2024	Chapter 3 Revolution of Imagination	7-11 August	Pendulum (DJ set), Damian Marley, DJ EZ, Sherelle, Soft Play, Ross from Friends, I. Jordan, High Contrast, David Rodigan, Kettama	£345
2025	Chapter 4 Power of Now	6-10 August	Sean Paul, Sex Pistols, Overmono, Azealia Banks (cancelled, replaced by Spice), Nia Archives, Honey Dijon, Maribou State, The Wailers, Dimension, Chris Stussy, Interplanetary Criminal, Boney M, Goldie, Rudimental, Andy C, Joy Orbison, Joey Valence & Brae, The Blessed Madonna, Fat Dog, I Hate Models, Koffee, Souls of Mischief, Eats Everything, Ben Hemsley, Eliza Rose, Alien Ant Farm, Casisdead, Ms Dynamite, MJ Cole, Calibre, Roni Size, The Wurzels, Pa Salieu, Nova Twins, Skream, The Mary Wallopers, Altern-8, Babylon Circus, Kenya Grace, LTJ Bukem, Craig Charles, Ferocious Dog	£320
2026	Chapter 5 Radical Redesign	12-16 August	Skrillex, Kneecap, Scissor Sisters, Madness, Four Tet, Faithless, Scooter, Ashnikko, Shaggy, Eve, Ren Alborosie, Alix Perez, A.M.C, Andy C, Altern-8, Antony Szmierek, Bad Manners, Beans On Toast, Beardyman, Brutalismus 3000, Camo & Krooked, Darren Styles, David Rodigan, DJ EZ, Eats Everything, Elvana, Fantazia, Floating Points, Folamour, Fcukers, General Levy, Gentleman's Dub Club, Groove Armada, Grooverider, Henge, High Vis, Jamz Supernova, K-Klass, Kings of the Rollers, Less Than Jake, Mefjus, Mobb Deep, Morgan Seatree, Mungo's Hi Fi, Nimino, Panic Shack, Peaches, Princess Nokia, Rose Gray, Ross from Friends, Shy FX, The Skinner Brothers, Skindred, Slipmatt, Songer, Sonique, Sub Focus, Sampa the Great, SBTRKT, Sherelle, TSHA, Vengaboys, Wilkinson, Young Franco	£340
2027	Chapter 6 Wild Style	11-15 August	Bicep (Live), Noisia (more TBC)	

== Charitable activities ==
Donations to various charities are made each year from the festival's profits; in 2015 these were the Energy Revolution Initiative, Winchester Youth Counselling and Trinity Winchester. Tickets are donated to charity for raffles and competitions, and the festival works with Oxfam, MyCauseUK and Isle of Wight Air Ambulance who provide stewards. The festival also produces a fundraising CD at Christmas. Since 2014, the festival have provided free children's arts & craft workshops at a pop-up event in nearby Winchester.

For the 2019 event, Boomtown partnered with TreeSisters, an organization focusing on reforestation with women, to plant one tree for every ticket bought (48,000). After the event, it was announced that the partnership planted 71,725 trees.

== Incidents and deaths ==
During the 2011 festival, a woman aged 45 suffered a fatal heart attack after taking ecstasy.

In 2013, 18-year-old Ellie Rowe from Glastonbury, Somerset, died after consuming alcohol and ketamine. The incident occurred the same day ketamine was reclassified from a class C to class B drug in the UK. In the years following Rowe's death, her mother has become an advocate for on-site drug testing, saying the facilities may have saved her life.

The following year, 31-year-old Lisa Williamson from Hereford was found hanged in a campsite toilet after using drugs.

In 2016, 18-year-old Olivia Christopher from Chesham, Buckinghamshire, was discovered dead in her tent after a suspected drug overdose. It is believed she had consumed a cocktail of cocaine, ketamine, LSD, MDMA, and alcohol. That year, the police seized £79,000 of drugs at the festival, with an additional £55,000 worth being placed in amnesty bins at the gates.

From 2017, until authorities withdrew consent in 2019, drug-safety charity The Loop offered front-of-house drug testing on-site at Boomtown. During the period this service, involving sample testing and tailored harm reduction advice, was available, no drug-related deaths occurred at the festival.

In 2024, 22-year-old Benjamin Buckfield from Essex died at Boomtown festival after taking MDMA powder.

In 2026, 20-year-old Corey Jamison, of Willow Close, Bromsgrove, Worcestershire, died at the Royal Hampshire County Hospital in Winchester on August 18, two days after the festival ended. A post-mortem examination gave his causes of death as hypoxic ischaemic encephalopathy, cardiac arrest, epileptic seizure and cocaine use.

== Awards and nominations ==
=== DJ Magazine's top 50 Festivals ===
Year	Category	Work	Result	Ref.
2019	World's Best Festival	Boomtown Fair	23rd	
2022	World's Best Festival	Boomtown Fair	24th	
2023	World's Best Festival	Boomtown Fair	18th	
2024	World's Best Festival	Boomtown Fair	24th	
2025	World's Best Festival	Boomtown Fair	15th	

=== Drum & Bass Awards ===
Year	Category	Work	Result	Ref.
2017	Best Festival	Boomtown Fair	2	
2018	Best Event 2017	Boomtown Fair	3	
2018	Best Festival	Boomtown Fair	1	
2019	Best Festival	Boomtown Fair	2	
2020	Best Event 2019	Boomtown Fair	1	
2020	Best Festival	Boomtown Fair	2	
2022	Best Festival	Boomtown Fair	1	

=== A Greener Festival ===
Year	Category	Work	Result	Ref.
2019	A Greener Festival	Boomtown Fair	Commended	
2020	A Greener Festival	Boomtown Fair	Commended	

=== UK Festival Awards ===
Year	Category	Work	Result	Ref.
2018	Best Festival Production	Boomtown Fair	Nominated	
2019	Best Festival Production	Boomtown Fair	Nominated	
2019	The Greener Festival Award	Boomtown Fair	Nominated	
2022	Best Festival Production	Boomtown Fair	Winner	
2023	Best Festival Production	Boomtown Fair	Winner	
2023	Transport Impact Innovators Award	Boomtown Fair	Winner	

== See also ==
- List of electronic music festivals
- List of music festivals in the United Kingdom
