= Heathcote Williams =

English poet, actor, political activist and dramatist (1941-2017)

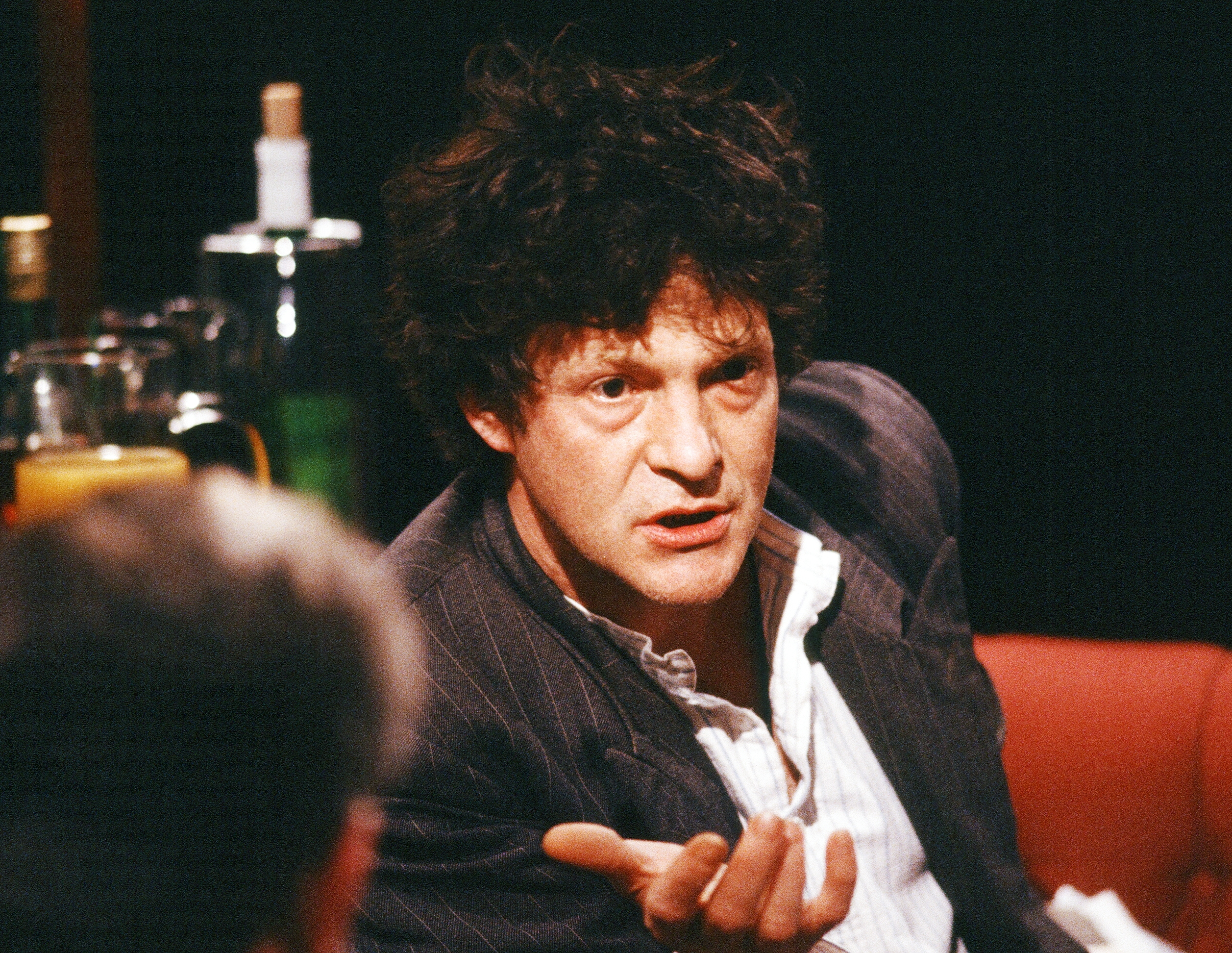
- Williams in 1988
- Born: John Henley Heathcote-Williams; 15 November 1941; Helsby, Cheshire, England
- Died: 1 July 2017 (aged 75); Oxford, Oxfordshire, England
- Occupations: Poet, actor, playwright
- Years active: 1964–2017
- Children: 3

John Henley Heathcote-Williams (15 November 1941 – 1 July 2017), known as Heathcote Williams, was an English poet, actor, political activist and dramatist. He wrote a number of book-length polemical poems including Autogeddon, Falling for a Dolphin and Whale Nation, which in 1988 was described by Philip Hoare as "the most powerful argument for the newly instigated worldwide ban on whaling." Williams invented his idiosyncratic "documentary/investigative poetry" style which he put to good purpose bringing a diverse range of environmental and political matters to public attention. His last published work, American Porn was a critique of the American political establishment and the election of President Donald Trump; its publication date was the day of Trump's inauguration (20 January 2017). In June 2015 he published a book-length investigative poem about the "Muslim Gandhi", Khan Abdul Ghaffar Khan, Badshah Khan.

As well as being a playwright and screenwriter, Williams appeared in a number of independent and Hollywood films and was among the celebrity guests in the last episode of season 4 of Friends, '"The One With Ross's Wedding"'. He played Prospero in Derek Jarman's The Tempest (1979) and appeared in several "arthouse" films, including Orlando (1992), as well as the Hollywood film Basic Instinct 2 (2006). Al Pacino played the part of a Williams fan in a spoof arts documentary, Every Time I Cross the Tamar I Get into Trouble. Williams also wrote lyrics, collaborating with Marianne Faithfull among others.

Williams was a keen naturalist and discovered a new species of honey-producing wasp in the Argentine pampas, an event he recorded in a book of poems called Forbidden Fruit. Williams was a magician and a member of The Magic Circle. He wrote a TV play called What the Dickens! about Charles Dickens's penchant for performing magic shows. Bob Hoskins taught him fire eating. When he went to demonstrate his newfound talent to then girlfriend Jean Shrimpton, he accidentally set himself alight on her doorstep.

Williams was a leading activist in the London squatting scene in the 1970s and ran a squatters "estate agency" called the "Ruff Tuff Cream Puff". In 1977 he and a couple of hundred fellow squatters established the "state" of Frestonia in Notting Hill and declared independence from Britain. The then Shadow Chancellor, Geoffrey Howe, wrote to express his support and Williams was appointed UK Ambassador. Frestonia lasted almost a decade and had its own institutions and postage stamps.

Williams spray-painted graffiti on the walls of Buckingham Palace as a protest against the Queen signing Michael X's death warrant while there was no capital punishment in the UK. In the early 1970s, his agitational graffiti were a feature on the walls of the then low-rent end of London's Notting Hill district. The final paragraph of Williams' New York Times obituary summed up his philosophy: "If poetry isn't revolutionary, it's nothing," he told Saira Viola from the web publication Gonzo Today in 2015. "Poetry is heightened language, and language exists to effect change, not to be a tranquilizer."

== Early life and career ==
John Henley Heathcote-Williams was born in Helsby, Cheshire. After his schooldays at Eton, he changed his name to Heathcote Williams. His father, Harold Heathcote-Williams, was a barrister (appointed Queen's Counsel) and his mother, (Margaret) Julian (née Henley) a clergyman's daughter. His first book was The Speakers (1964), an account of life at Speakers' Corner in London's Hyde Park, written when he was 22. The Speakers attracted enthusiastic reviews, with Harold Pinter describing it as "brilliant... a remarkable achievement and very, very funny". In 1974, it was adapted for the stage by the Joint Stock Theatre Company.

His first full-length play, AC/DC (1970), first staged at the Royal Court Theatre, is a critique of the burgeoning mental health industry; it includes a thinly veiled attack on 1960s alternative society, and the proponent of the anti-psychiatry movement, R.D. Laing. Its production did not, however, appear to impede cordial relations between the two men in later years. AC/DC won the London Evening Standard's Most Promising Play Award. It also received the 1972 John Whiting Award for being "a new and distinctive development in dramatic writing with particular relevance to contemporary society." It was described in the Times Literary Supplement in a front-page review by Charles Marowitz as "the first play of the 21st century." AC/DC was produced in New York City in 1971 at the Chelsea Theater Center at the Brooklyn Academy of Music.

Other plays include the one-act monologue Hancock's Last Half Hour, The Local Stigmatic, The Immortalist and the impossible to categorise Remember The Truth Dentist – an early effort, again at the Royal Court, directed by Ken Campbell.

The inaugural issue of the London Review of Books included an effusive profile by fellow Etonian Francis Wyndham titled The Magic of Heathcote Williams.

== Poetry ==
Williams had often been reluctant to co-operate in the promotion of his work commercially, refusing, for example, to go to the US to promote AC/DC, to the despair of his publishers. The only book signing tour he ever did – "enough," he complained, "to cripple a rock-star" – was the result of relentless pressure from Jonathan Cape's PR department.

Energetic publicity efforts on Williams' behalf, the responsibility of Cape's Polly Samson, enabled him to reach a wider audience for his trilogy of book-length poems on environmental themes. Each of them was the result of detailed research and featured many photographs. Written some years earlier as visionary propaganda, they had otherwise been gathering dust in a corner of his then agent's office. The North American rights for the poem Whale Nation (1988) were sold at the Frankfurt Book Fair for $100,000; Williams donated his share of the advance to environmental organizations. According to another writer on this subject, Philip Hoare in 2008, it is an "epic plea for the future of the whale, a hymn to the beauty, majesty and intelligence of the largest mammals on earth, as well as a prayer for their protection... Whale Nation became the most powerful argument for the newly instigated worldwide ban on whaling, and for a moment, back in 1988, it seemed as if a shameful chapter in human history might finally be drawing to a close.".

Whale Nation was followed by Sacred Elephant (1989), which deals with the devastation of the natural environment, and Autogeddon (1991), which characterises the motor car's global death toll as, "A humdrum holocaust, the third world war nobody bothered to declare." Each poem was made into a film by BBC Television, Autogeddon being performed by Jeremy Irons. Williams' public readings of Whale Nation reduced some members of the audience to tears. His recordings for Naxos Records, which include readings from the Buddhist scriptures, Dante and the Bible, have won awards.

In 2011, Williams began a new collaboration with Roy Hutchins, who had performed Whale Nation, Autogeddon and Falling for a Dolphin in the 1980s. The result was Zanzibar Cats, a performance of recent short poems. In What's on Stage, the reviewer Michael Coveney wrote: "These wonderful poems seize on political absurdity, planetary destruction and social injustice with relish and delight, as well as great erudition and verbal dexterity."

In December 2011, Huxley Scientific Press published a collection of poems by Williams on science and nature entitled Forbidden Fruit. The title poem is an elegy for mathematician, computer pioneer, and wartime codebreaker Alan Turing, the centenary of whose birth occurred in 2012. The Beat poet Michael McClure called the book "a collection of inspirations … as rich and dark as wasp honey". At the end of 2012, Huxley Scientific Press published Shelley at Oxford: Blasphemy, Book-Burning, and Bedlam, written by Williams during the bicentenary of Shelley's expulsion from Oxford for atheism, aged 19.

Williams regularly published new work on the digital, resurrected International Times. Royal Babylon: The Criminal Record of the British Monarchy was made into a video installation by the filmmaker collective Handsome Dog, to coincide with Queen Elizabeth II's diamond jubilee, and his poems Lord of the Drones: The President and the White House Fly, Hollywoodland, and Was Moby Dick Behind 9/11? (2012) are currently being edited into a trilogy—Autopsy: The American Empire Dissected.

In June 2015, 'Badshah Khan: Islamic Peace Warrior' was published by Thin Man Press. Williams's "poetic investigation" reviews the life and legacy of Khan Abdul Ghaffar Khan (1890–1988).

Williams's riposte to the election of President Donald Trump, American Porn, was published by Thin Man Press on 20 January, Trump's inauguration day.

== Political pamphlets ==
In 2016, Williams responded to contemporary political events with a pamphlet in the Swiftean tradition, an excoriating commentary on Boris Johnson entitled 'The Blond Beast of Brexit: a Study in Depravity'. The pamphlet was described by a review as "a 20,000-word collage of the most maniacal, hypocritical, and cruel things the former mayor has ever said or done".

Later that year, an updated and expanded version, 'Brexit Boris: From Mayor to Nightmare', was published by Public Reading Rooms.

== Bibliography ==
- The Speakers, Hutchinson, 1964 (e-book Thin Man Press, 2017)
- The Local Stigmatic, Penguin: Traverse Plays,
- Film script: Malatesta, 1970, Germany dir. Peter Lilienthal
- AC/DC, Calder & Boyars, 1970
- Manifestoes/Manifesten, Cold Turkey Press, 1974
- Hancock's Last Half Hour, 1976
- Television: Channel 4: What the Dickens, 1983
- Whale Nation, Jonathan Cape, 1988
- Sacred Elephant, Jonathan Cape, 1989,
- Falling for a Dolphin, Jonathan Cape, 1991
- Autogeddon, Jonathan Cape, 1992
- Forbidden Fruit, Huxley Scientific Press, 20
- Royal Babylon, Skyscraper Books, 2015
- Badshah Khan: Islamic Peace Warrior, Thin Man Press, 2016
- The Last Dodo, New River Press, 2016
- Brexit Boris: From Mayor to Nightmare, Public Reading Rooms, 2016
- American Porn, Thin Man Press, 2017

== Painting and sculpture ==
Williams's second bout of fame caused him to cease writing in effect, and turn to painting and sculpture full-time. Leading the life of a would-be recluse, he received prolonged tuition from the 'New Ruralist' artist Graham Ovenden, at the latter's home on the edge of Bodmin Moor, Cornwall. The result was an out-pouring of hundreds of canvases, including satires of the works of Van Gogh, Claude Monet, Stanley Spencer, Lucian Freud and others. He also produced a number of sculptures of great piles of books, tottering and damp-swollen, elaborately hand-carved in wood.

== Song-writing ==
Williams's occasional but typically anarchistic forays into the realm of lyric-writing include the uncategorisable and unreleased "Wrinkly Bonk", and "Why D'Ya Do It?", a sexually explicit exploration of carnal jealousy, for Marianne Faithfull's 1979 classic album Broken English. Williams's words were enough to cause a walk-out by the female workers on EMI's production line.

== Magazines ==
Williams was for a time associate editor of the literary journal Transatlantic Review, as well as being one of those responsible for the alternative sex paper Suck. He was a frequent contributor to the London underground paper International Times during the 1970s, to the radical vegetarian magazine Seed and to The Fanatic, issues of which would appear sporadically and provocatively in different formats and various countries of Western Europe. In 1974, he launched his own mimeographed underground newspaper, The Sunday Head. It was published from his home in Notting Hill Gate, London at the time when he was also the impresario for Albion Free State's Meat Roxy, a series of music, dance and poetry events held in a squatted, redundant bingo hall near the Portobello market.

An anthology of his tracts and manifestos from this period, Severe Joy, was announced by his then publisher but for some reason never actually appeared. A sampling did appear in a bi-lingual, limited edition titled Manifestoes from the Rotterdam-based Cold Turkey Press as well as in the Manchester literary magazine Wordworks in 1975.

== Film ==
The theme of Williams' early one-act play The Local Stigmatic is fame and its adverse consequences, performed by Al Pacino at an Off-Off-Broadway venue, with financial assistance from Jon Voight. In later years the film version became known as 'Pacino's secret project,' his debut as a director. It was finally released as part of the Pacino: An Actor's Vision box-set in 2007.

Williams' own film performances include Prospero in Derek Jarman's version of The Tempest (1979), Wish You Were Here (1987), Stormy Monday (1988), Sally Potter's Orlando (1992), The Browning Version (1994), The Steal (1995), Blue Juice (1995) with Catherine Zeta Jones, Bring Me the Head of Mavis Davis (1997), The Odyssey (1997), Cousin Bette (1998), The Legend of 1900 (1998) and Alice in Wonderland (1999). Williams also appeared in Hotel (2001) with Salma Hayek, which he also co-wrote, and enjoyed a steady stream of bit-parts in big-budget Hollywood productions, such as the ill-fated Basic Instinct 2 (2006) and City of Ember (2008).

== Television ==
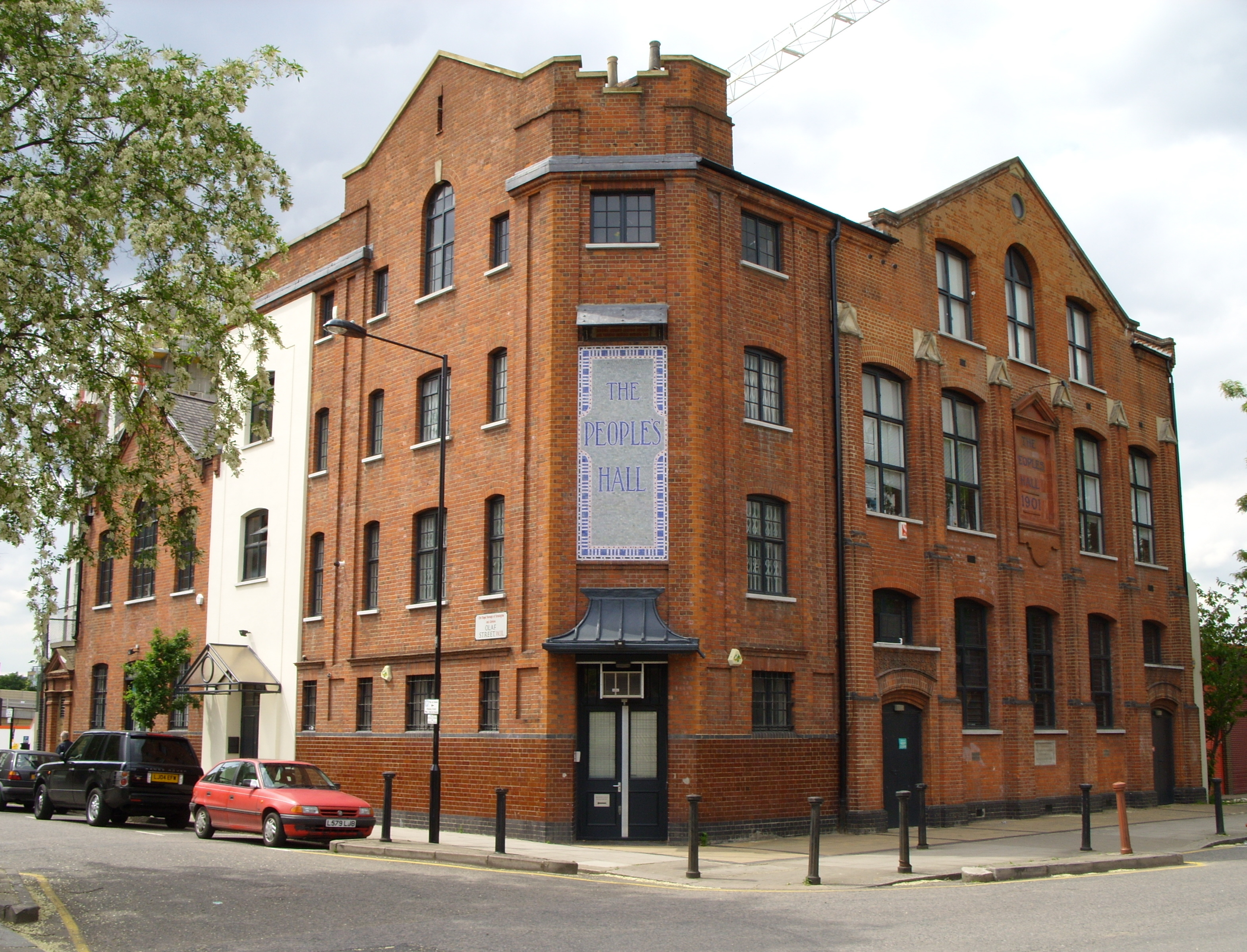
The National Theatre of Frestonia: by day it was the People's Hall, focal point for the independence movement. It staged Williams's one-act play The Immortalist, in which David Rappaport interviewed a 278-year-old man. In a later Institute of Contemporary Arts production the TV personality Joan Bakewell played the incredulous interviewer.

Williams' contact with television overlapped with his activity in community politics. In a 1970s experiment by the BBC in public access television Williams, in the guise of a tree, spoke for fifteen minutes on the virtues of life unencumbered by the rule of Westminster. Albion Free State was his name for a utopian vision of an England free from government and bosses. Williams was one of 120 or so squatters who had commandeered a small chunk of West London, just about visible from BBC Television Centre itself. Frestonia, as the extensive squat was known, had declared itself independent of Great Britain. The actor David Rappaport was proclaimed Foreign Minister and Williams served as ambassador to the UK. Postage stamps were issued bearing the face of Guy the Gorilla instead of the Queen; they made no mention of currency, but simply carried the legend, God Will Provide. The project, which exasperated the authorities for years, provoked much litigation before the bulldozers were finally able to move in.

Williams later applied his abilities as a conjurer – he was a member of The Magic Circle – to come up with a Christmas play based on Charles Dickens's enthusiasm for performing magic shows for his friends and extended family. What the Dickens! depicted the novelist, with the likes of Thomas Carlyle and Thackeray standing by to assist, as he manipulated "airy nothings" and assorted props to the delighted squeals of foundling children from the Thomas Coram Home. The production featured a young Ben Cross as Dickens, with a supporting cast that included Dinsdale Landen and Kenneth Haigh. It was broadcast by Channel 4 in Christmas 1983, with a repeat screening the following Christmas.

In July 1988, Williams made an extended appearance on the Channel 4 discussion programme After Dark, alongside Petra Kelly, James Lovelock, C.W. Nicol and others.

In March 1993, Williams was the subject of a half-hour spoof arts documentary, a meditation on fame and fandom titled Every Time I Cross the Tamar I Get into Trouble. Screened by Channel Four in its Without Walls slot, the BFI film database characterises the film thus: "An account of Heathcote William's work, and Al Pacino's obsession with his writing. Includes an interview with Harold Pinter and footage from Pacino's film The Local Stigmatic." The half-hour film was presented by the comedian and musician John Dowie, an avid collector of Williams memorabilia.

== Personal life ==
Williams's personal life was always turbulent. An affair with the model Jean Shrimpton resulted in the writer setting himself alight on her doorstep. Whether this was intentional or the upshot of a magic stunt gone wrong – Williams at the time was an ardent fire-eater – is unknown. Although at the time, it was assumed Shrimpton had ended the relationship, in her autobiography published in the early 1990s, Shrimpton asserted that it was Williams who walked out on her.

Williams had a son, Charlie, born in 1989, from a relationship with novelist and journalist Polly Samson. In 1994, Samson married Pink Floyd guitarist David Gilmour, who became Charlie's adoptive father.

Williams and Samson had become involved with each other during the publication of Whale Nation, which Samson publicised and succeeded in turning into a best-selling volume despite its author's reluctance to promote his work (see §Poetry).

Williams lived in Oxford with longterm partner Diana Senior. They had two daughters and three grandchildren.

== Illness and death ==
Williams died on 1 July 2017 in Oxford, Oxfordshire, from kidney failure, after a long stay in hospital for a chest infection.

== See also ==
- Autogeddon, an album by Julian Cope "inspired by Heathcote Williams' epic poem of the same name..."
- Juggling Ghosts: Close Encounters with Twelve Luminaries and some Tigers, London, Open Head Press, 2021. Heathcote's essays on people he admired published as 12 separate booklets in a slip case: William Burroughs, Harold Pinter, Dylan Thomas, Sinclair Beiles, Christopher Marlowe, Lord Richard Buckley, Christopher Smart, Percy Bysshe Shelley, Michael John Lesser, Alan Turing, Diogenes of Sinope, William Blake. Introduction by Prue Cooper and illustrated by Andrzej Krauze
