= Chinchilla (singer) =

British singer

CHINCHILLA
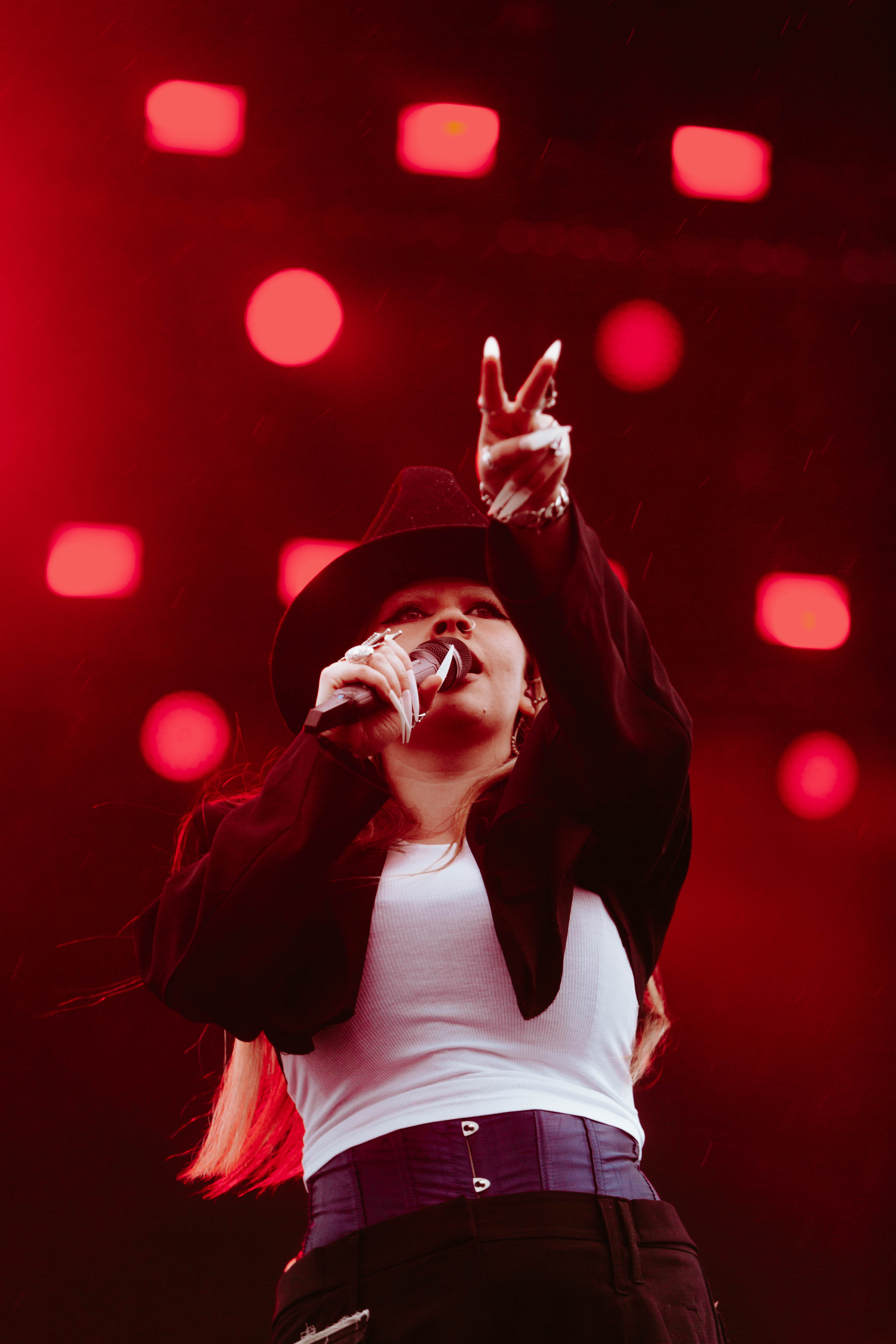

Background information
- Born: 2 December 1996 (age 29); London, England
- Genres: Pop; synth-pop; electropop; alternative pop; indie pop; R&B
- Occupations: Singer; rapper
- Instruments: Vocals; Piano
- Years active: 2019–present
- Labels: Former: Columbia; Island; Republic
- Website: www.chinchilla-official.com

Daisy Bertenshaw (born 2 December 1996), also known as Chinchilla (stylised in all caps), is a British singer and rapper.

== Early life ==
Born and raised in London, both her parents worked as actors. While she was at school, she played in a band with six of her friends. She enrolled in a creative artistry course at Metropolis Studios, run by the music college ACM, she graduated in 2018 with a degree in Music Industry Practice.

== Career ==
Chinchilla independently released her debut single "Elements" in 2019, and her debut EP Awakening in 2020, receiving positive coverage with Clash's Robin Murray describing it as "remarkable introduction" and "an empowering document from the pop polymath". Released on August 13, 2021 Bertenshaw's second EP Moon Maintenance for Dummies was met with positive reviews from music critics. "ASBO" magazine's Connor Fogarty wrote that "true to her eclectic, one-of-a-kind style, each track delivers a generous handful of different genre influences and bravado, ranging all the way from country to nineties R&B."

Bertenshaw auditioned for the twelfth series of The Voice UK, where she performed "I Put a Spell on You" at the blind auditions. Judges will.i.am, Anne-Marie, and Olly Murs turned around for her. She opted to join Anne-Marie. In the callbacks she competed against Lil Shakz, Ryan Barton and Nia Ekanem performing the song "Virtual Insanity" where she was eliminated.

Performances on The Voice UK
Performed	Song	Original Artist	Result
Blind Audition	"I Put a Spell on You"	Screamin' Jay Hawkins	Joined Team Anne-Marie
Callbacks	"Virtual Insanity"	Jamiroquai	Eliminated

In April 2023, Bertenshaw released her most successful single to date "Little Girl Gone". The track managed to peak at number 91 on UK's 'update' chart as well as it helped her to become the first female soloist in the Billboard 's Emerging Artists chart's six-year history to debut at number 1. The track also serves as the lead single for her third extended play. On March 19, 2024, Bertenshaw released "MF Diamond". When speaking about the track's music video, Chinchilla stated "I wanted to make something inclusive without being corny or cliché. Something about elderly/older women makes me think of diamonds." Her third extended play Flytrap was announced in May 2024, and subsequently released in June that year.

== Artistry ==
Bertenshaw's music touches on alternative pop and R&B, but she herself described her music as "feisty-pop".

CHINCHILLA's logo

She also stated that "the biggest word that ties together my whole sound and project is empowerment." Bertenshaw cited Prince, Alabama Shakes, 070 Shake and Bon Iver as her influences. She also stated that her "biggest" influences are Beyonce, Rihanna, Janis Joplin and Aretha Franklin.

== Discography ==
=== Studio albums ===
List of studio albums
Title	Album details
I Swear I Don't Want to Be Sad	Release date: 29 January 2027; Label: Chinchilla Ltd, Kartel Music; Formats: Vinyl, CD, Digital download, streaming

=== EPs ===
Title	Details	Peak chart positions
Title	Details	UK DL
Awakening	Released: 17 April 2020; Label: Chinchilla Ltd.; Format: Digital download, streaming	—
Moon Maintenance for Dummies	Released: 13 August 2021; Label: Columbia; Format: Digital download, streaming	—
Flytrap	Released: 7 June 2024; Label: Chinchilla Ltd, Island, Republic; Format: Digital download, streaming	42
Live: Summer '24	Released: 13 December 2024; Label: Chinchilla Ltd, Island, Republic; Format: Digital download, streaming	—
Ok As I Am: The Trilogy	Released: 12 September 2025; Label: Chinchilla Ltd, Island, Republic; Format: Vinyl, digital download, streaming	—

=== Singles ===
==== As lead artist ====
Title	Year	Peak chart positions				Certifications	Album
Title	Year	UK DL	NZ Hot	US Bub.	US Dig.	Certifications	Album
"Elements"	2019	—	—	—	—		Non-album singles
"Fabulous"	2019	—	—	—	—		Non-album singles
"Demand Respect"	2019	—	—	—	—		Non-album singles
"Cold Water"	2019	—	—	—	—		Non-album singles
"How to Be Me" (with Ren)	2019	—	—	—	—		Non-album singles
"The Lockdown Getdown"	2020	—	—	—	—		Non-album singles
"Fingers"	2021	—	—	—	—		Moon Maintenance for Dummies
"Chalk Outlines" (with Ren)	2021	—	—	—	—		Non-album single
"Little Girl Gone" (Note: "Little Girl Gone" is also a part of I Swear I Don't Want to Be Sad album (2027).)	2023	17	6	10	3	BPI: Silver; RIAA: Gold; RMNZ: Gold	Flytrap
"Cut You Off"	2023	—	—	—	—		Flytrap
"MF Diamond"	2024	—	—	—	—		Flytrap
"1:5"	2024	—	—	—	—		Flytrap
"The Chain"	2024	—	—	—	—		My Lady Jane
"Do You See Me Now" (with Isobel Waller-Bridge)	2024	—	—	—	—		Sweetpea
"Avoidance"	2025	—	—	—	—		Ok As I Am: The Trilogy
"Ok As I Am"	2025	—	—	—	—		Ok As I Am: The Trilogy
"To Have & Hold"	2025	—	—	—	—		Ok As I Am: The Trilogy
"Dog Eat Dog"	2026	—	—	—	—		I Swear I Don't Want to Be Sad
"Viper"	2026	—	—	—	—		I Swear I Don't Want to Be Sad
"Irrevocably Changed"	2026	—	—	—	—		I Swear I Don't Want to Be Sad
"Strawberry Golden Skies"	2026	—	—	—	—		I Swear I Don't Want to Be Sad
"—" denotes a recording that did not chart or was not released in that territory.

==== As featured artist ====
Title	Year	Peak chart positions				Album
Title	Year	EST	EST Dom.	EST Air.	LAT Air.	Album
"Fk This Up" (Noëp featuring Chinchilla)	2019	17	4	20	—	Non-album singles
"On My Way" (Noëp featuring Chinchilla)	2020	*		1	22	Non-album singles
"—" denotes a recording that did not chart or was not released in that territory. "*" denotes that the chart did not exist at that time.

== Tours ==
Headline Tours

- Avoidance Live (2025)
- EU Tour (2025)
