= Are We There Yet? (Rick Astley album) =

Studio album by Rick Astley
- Released: 13 October 2023
- Studios: Astley's home studio, London
- Length: 41:08
- Label: BMG
- Producer: Rick Astley

Rick Astley chronology
The Best of Me (2019)	Are We There Yet? (2023)

Singles from Are We There Yet?
- 1. "Dippin My Feet" Released: 20 June 2023; 2. "Never Gonna Stop" Released: 22 August 2023; 3. "Forever and More" Released: 30 October 2023; 4. "Driving Me Crazy" Released: 9 February 2024

Are We There Yet? is the ninth studio album by the English singer and songwriter Rick Astley, released on 13 October 2023 by BMG. It was preceded by the lead single "Dippin My Feet" and the single "Never Gonna Stop". Astley toured the UK, Ireland and Europe in support of the album from November 2023 to March 2024. The album is Astley's first of new music since Beautiful Life (2018). It peaked at No. 2 on the UK Albums Chart. It is Astley's first album to not have a picture of himself as the cover.

== Background and recording ==
Are We There Yet? was announced on 20 June 2023 alongside the release of the album's lead single "Dippin My Feet". This came ahead of Astley performing on the Pyramid Stage at the Glastonbury Festival 2023, where he also performed "Dippin My Feet". Astley had previously been asked to perform there in 2020, but it was cancelled due to the COVID-19 pandemic.

The album was inspired by the soul music of Marvin Gaye, Al Green and Bill Withers, and recorded at the Astley's home studio in London. Astley stated that he believed "spending five months in America" on tour there in 2022 "retuned [his] ear a little bit" in regards to his guitar playing.

== Singles ==
The lead single "Dippin My Feet" was released on 20 June 2023. Astley said of the song: "It's not Americana, but the tagline at the start of the chorus is: 'Dipping my feet in the Mississippi River...' It's definitely not country, but I've never twanged a guitar as much as I have in the past couple of months." "Dippin My Feet" peaked at number 95 on the UK Singles Sales Chart.

The second single "Never Gonna Stop" was released on 22 August 2023. Astley revealed that he wrote the song after reading an article about artificial intelligence. "Never Gonna Stop" spent several weeks on the UK Singles Sales Chart, it has over 4.8 million views on YouTube and peaked at number 49. The video was filmed by his wife on a mobile phone on a beach in Denmark, with Astley stating it was done "on a shoestring" as they "had run out of time to make a video" because he had been ill.

The third single, "Forever and More", was released on 30 October, with its music video following on 9 November, directed by Simon Pegg with assistance from the Mission: Impossible – The Final Reckoning crew.

== Critical reception ==
Professional ratings
Review scores
Source	Rating
AllMusic	4/5 stars
Hot Press	7/10
i	4/5 stars
Retropop	4/5 stars

Matt Collar of AllMusic wrote that the album "feels like a love letter to the earthy, blues-influenced work of artists like Bill Withers and Otis Redding" and found that "all of the rootsy soulfulness Astley embraces on Are We There Yet? is far removed from the studio sophistication of his early hits. That said, it feels genuine and hard-won by age and experience." Retropop called it "some of his finest work since the 1980s" and felt that the "direction [...] perfectly compliments Astley's distinctive vocals, be it on mid tempo guitar-led numbers like 'Letting Go' and 'Golden Hour', or more R&B-leaning tunes in the vein of 'Never Gonna Stop' and 'Waterfall'".

Hot Press's John Walshe stated that "what perhaps shouldn't be surprising is how competent he sounds, with tracks like the slow Stax feel of 'Golden Hour' proving just how good those 57-year-old pipes are", describing it as a "return as surprisingly good as it is unlikely". Ed Power of i wrote that "Astley gets on with business by serving up a satisfying collection of mid-tempo, Motown-inflected rock 'n' roll" that "offers a glimpse at the vulnerable human being behind the joyful persona".

Retropop ranked the album sixth in their ranking of the top 10 best albums of 2023, with the publication's Connor Gotto writing that Astley sounds "revitalised and renewed", with the album "perfectly compliment[ing] Astley's distinctive vocals, be it on mid-tempo guitar-led numbers like 'Letting Go' and 'Golden Hour', or more R&B-leaning tunes in the vein of 'Never Gonna Stop' and 'Waterfall'".

== Commercial performance ==
Are We There Yet? debuted at No. 2 on the UK Albums Chart. At the midweek point, the album had been at No. 1, 400 chart units ahead of No. 2, Sick Boi by Welsh rapper Ren Gill, which eventually debuted at the top.

== Track listing ==
All tracks are written by Rick Astley.

Are We There Yet? track listing
No.	Title	Length
1.	"Dippin My Feet"	3:13
2.	"Letting Go"	3:22
3.	"Golden Hour"	3:45
4.	"Never Gonna Stop"	3:17
5.	"Close (Your Shoes)"	3:37
6.	"High Enough"	3:27
7.	"Forever and More"	3:37
8.	"Driving Me Crazy"	3:32
9.	"Maria Love"	3:34
10.	"Take Me Back to Your Place"	3:15
11.	"Waterfall"	3:12
12.	"Blue Sky"	3:17
Total length:		41:08

== Personnel ==
Musicians

- Rick Astley – lead vocals, backing vocals, bass, drums, guitar
- Dawn Joseph – backing vocals (tracks 1–4, 6, 7, 9, 11)
- Lauren Johnson – backing vocals (1–4, 6, 7, 9, 11)
- Rob Taggart – keyboards (1, 3, 8)
- Lene Bausager – choir (1)
- Tom Ashpitel – choir (1)
- Katie Owens – choir (1)
- Simon Mattacks – choir (1)
- Peter Neill – choir (1)
- James Knight – brass, saxophone (9)
- Barnaby Dickinson – trombone (9)
- George Hogg – trumpet (9)
- Katy Cox – cello (12)

Technical

- Rick Astley – production, engineering
- Geoff Pesche – mastering, engineering
- Dan Frampton – mixing, engineering
- Chris Bolster – engineering
- Tom Ashpitel – engineering
- Tom Hall – mastering assistance

Visuals

- Lene Bausager – concept, back cover photo
- Giulia Villa – design
- Ekaterina Belinkata – cover photo
- Peter Neill – sleeve photo

== Charts ==
Chart performance for Are We There Yet?
Chart (2023)	Peak position
Australian Digital Albums (ARIA)	25
Belgian Albums (Ultratop Flanders)	97
Belgian Albums (Ultratop Wallonia)	158
German Albums (Offizielle Top 100)	29
Scottish Albums (Official Charts)	6
Spanish Albums (Promusicae)	77
UK Albums (Official Charts)	2
UK Independent Albums (Official Charts)	2
