= Ren Gill =

Welsh musician (born 1990)

Ren
- Ren in Glasgow (2026)

Background information
- Born: Ren Eryn Gill; 29 March 1990 (age 36); Bangor, Wales
- Origin: Dwyran, Anglesey, Wales
- Genres: Alternative rock; conscious hip-hop; R&B; indie; Reggae
- Occupations: Singer-songwriter; rapper; producer
- Instruments: Guitar; bass guitar; piano; drums; vocals
- Years active: 2009–present
- Formerly of: Trick the Fox; The Big Push
- Website: www.renmakesmusic.com

Ren Eryn Gill (born 29 March 1990), known professionally as Ren, is a Welsh singer-songwriter, rapper, musician and record producer. He was a member of Trick the Fox and the Brighton-based band The Big Push, and has released two solo studio albums, Freckled Angels (2016) and Sick Boi (2023).

Ren gained wider attention with the 2022 music video "Hi Ren", which explores themes of illness and mental health. Sick Boi reached number one on the UK Albums Chart in October 2023.

== Early life and education ==
Ren was born on 29 March 1990 in Bangor, Wales. At age four, his family moved to Anglesey, where he grew up in the village of Dwyran. He began playing guitar at age ten after his father gave him an acoustic guitar, and taught himself by learning riffs by Jimi Hendrix and John Frusciante. Ren studied music at Bath Spa University's Newton Park Campus and graduated with a Bachelor of Arts with Honours degree in Commercial Music.

His early musical influences included Shy FX, Micky Finn, Aphrodite, Eminem, Kurt Cobain, and Bob Marley, whose music his parents listened to. Ren has also cited the storytelling of filmmakers Quentin Tarantino, Stanley Kubrick, and Martin McDonagh as an influence on his songwriting.

== Career ==
=== Early career (2010–2018) ===
While studying music at Bath Spa University, Ren began busking and formed the band Trick the Fox with a classmate. While busking, Ren was discovered by producer Eric Appapoulay and he signed a recording contract with Sony in 2010.

In December 2010, Ren's childhood friend Joe Hughes died and his death influenced Ren's later songwriting about mental health. Ren and Charlie Fowler later began recording an album for Trick the Fox at Sanctuary Studio in South London, while the band also began touring. His worsening health interrupted his music career. Ren finished his debut solo album, Freckled Angels, to try to raise money for his medical treatment. He independently released the album, dedicating it and its title track to Hughes. On 28 December 2015, the fifth anniversary of Hughes's death, Ren announced the album's release.

Ren released his first official single, "Jessica", in 2016. He also appeared in the 2017 documentary film Unrest, which featured his song "Patience". Despite ongoing health problems, Ren resumed busking in Brighton, including performances with fellow musician Sam Tompkins. Ren also began uploading videos to his YouTube channel. By mid-18, videos of Ren and Tompkins busking together in Brighton were attracting hundreds of thousands of viewers.

=== The Big Push and Sick Boi (2019–2023) ===
Ren was also a member of The Big Push, a Brighton-based busking band. In June 2021, the group released the EP Can Do, Will Do ahead of a sold-out UK tour. The band went on hiatus in 2022, partly because of Ren's health issues. Ren's music videos "Jenny's Tale" and "Screech's Tale" were followed by "Violet's Tale" in 2022, completing a trilogy. He also released several EPs while working on his second album, Sick Boi.

On 15 December 2022, Ren released the music video for "Hi Ren" on YouTube. This video became a breakthrough in his solo career. "Hi Ren" explores Ren's experiences with illness and mental health through an internal dialogue. By March 2023, the music video had received 6.8 million views on YouTube. It also reached number 62 on the UK Video Streaming Chart, and received an honourable mention in the Best European Music Video category at the Prague Music Video Awards in April 2023. It was also nominated for Best Music Video at the Camerimage festival in October 2023. Ren directed the video, with cinematography by Samuel Perry-Falvey.

Before travelling to Canada for medical treatment in January 2023, Ren had recorded multiple songs and several videos, including most of his upcoming album, Sick Boi. In February 2023, Ren released a "retake" of the Verve song "Bitter Sweet Symphony". The band's bassist expressed his appreciation and sent Ren a guitar as a gift. He was invited to perform at the 2023 Glastonbury Festival and other major UK summer festivals, but declined because of his health and ongoing treatment in Canada.

Over the year before the release of his second album, Sick Boi, many tracks were released as singles to major streaming services, with accompanying videos published on Ren's YouTube channel. The singles, "Suicide" and "Murderer", both reached the Top 100 of the UK Singles Sales Chart. Ren also paid tribute to his childhood friend Joe Hughes in "Suicide" and the spoken-word piece "For Joe". The album was officially released on 13 October 2023, and explores Ren's experiences with chronic illness and mental health, alongside other personal and social themes. His music has been described as kaleidoscopic hip-hop.

In the midweek UK Albums Chart update on 16 October 2023, Sick Boi trailed Rick Astley's Are We There Yet? by fewer than 400 chart units. Sick Boi went on to reach number one on the UK Albums Chart, finishing almost 6,000 units ahead of Astley's album. Following Ren's chart success, Rick Astley congratulated him and praised his music. Huw Stephens included Sick Boi in his book Wales: 100 Records, calling it an "impressive record" and Ren's style of rapping "mesmerizing". That same month, Ren reached the number 4 on Billboard's Emerging Artists chart in the US.

Sick Boi debuted at number 137 on the US Billboard 200, earning 9,000 equivalent album units in its first week, while also reaching number two on Heatseekers Albums, number 11 on Top Current Album Sales and number 13 on Top Album Sales. Ren was unable to perform to promote his album due to his ongoing treatment in Canada. He credited his friends and fans for the album's success. On 1 November 2023, Ren was nominated for the Breakthrough Award at the Rolling Stone UK Awards.

In December 2023, the music video for "Money Game Part 3", from Sick Boi, was named Music Video of the Month by the London Music Video Awards. The music video was filmed as a one-shot and co-directed by Ren and Samuel Perry-Falvey.

=== Present career (2024–present) ===
In 2024, the music video for "Money Game Part 3" won Best Music Video, Best Director, and Best Concept at the London Music Video Awards, Best Music Video at the International Music Video awards, and Best European Independent Music Video at the ÉCU The European Independent Film Festival.

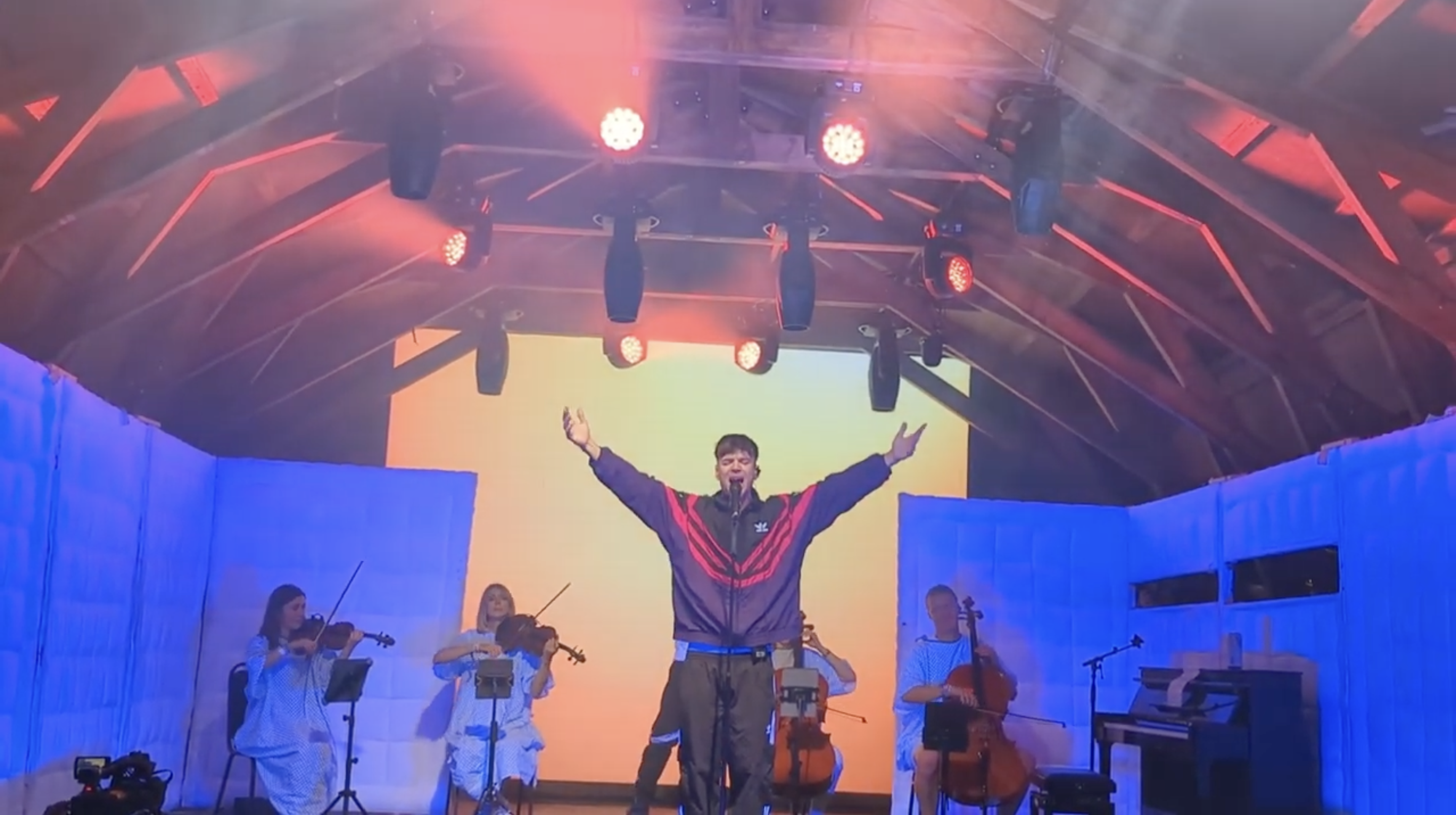
Ren performing "Bittersweet Symphony" at The Secret Garden Party in 2024

Ren performed a two-part, two-hour show titled "Asylum" at the 2024 Secret Garden Party. It was his first show in five years and featured collaborations with Chinchilla and Romain Axisa, theatrical performances and live strings. He also performed "Money Game Part 2" at the Sky Arts Awards in September 2024.

During February 2025, Ren performed in Fire in the Booth on YouTube, hosted by Charlie Sloth. Ren and the Skinner Brothers' single "So the Story Goes" reached number 95 on the Official Singles Downloads Chart in October 2025. Their EP Sick Sick Soul - Vol 1. reached number five on the Official Album Downloads Chart in November 2025.

In May 2026, Ren performed five shows with The Big Push in Glasgow, Brixton, Bristol, Brighton and Manchester. On 22 July 2026, Ren and Chris Webby released the 15-track collaborative album Asylum under the name Inpatient, working with producer JP On Da Track. The album reached number three on the UK Official Album Downloads Chart. In August 2026, Ren performed at Boardmasters and Boomtown Fair. He also performed at All Points East, where he was joined by Chinchilla for a performance of "Chalk Outlines".

== Health issues ==
Ren has Lyme disease, which went undiagnosed for many years, leaving him with ongoing health problems. While recording an album with Trick the Fox, Ren became ill, experiencing dissociation, physical pain, and fatigue that affected his ability to perform. He returned to his mother's home in Wales to recuperate, but remained bedridden for an extended period.

Ren later moved from Wales to Brighton. His health issues kept him homebound, but he continued writing songs and recording music in his bedroom. Ren was misdiagnosed with depression, bipolar disorder, and chronic fatigue syndrome, and was given numerous medications. When medical treatments failed to improve his condition, he said he tried supplements, alternative health practitioners and spiritual healing practices. During this period, Ren also experienced stress-induced psychosis and PTSD.

Ren was diagnosed with Lyme Disease in 2015 following a visit to a private clinic in Brussels. He subsequently went to the US for experimental stem-cell treatment. His health improved enough for him to resume busking in Brighton, although he continued to experience fatigue and ongoing autoimmune issues. Ren has spoken publicly about his experiences with Lyme disease and has called for more open discussions about mental health and suicide prevention.

By January 2023, Ren was in Canada receiving treatment for his ongoing symptoms. His treatment included intravenous infusions five days a week. Ren said his treatment was helping, although progress was uneven and he was trying different medications, with no clear timeline for his recovery. In 2023, Ren said he underwent an eight-month course of combination antibiotics for what he described as a Bartonella co-infection.

In September 2024, Ren announced plans to return to Canada for further treatment the following month. Later that month, Ren was hospitalised following what his team described as complications with his autoimmunity. In 2025, he said he had undergone a stem-cell transplant in Mexico.

== Fundraising and advocacy ==
In 2017, Ren was a spokesperson for Lyme Disease UK. In 2023, he organised a fundraiser for the RNLI crews on Anglesey in recognition of their efforts to search for his childhood friend Joe Hughes. The fundraiser exceeded its initial £5,000 target in one day. On 27 June 2023, Ren presented a £21,000 cheque to the RNLI volunteers at Beaumaris.

During September 2025, Ren participated in Project Lab Coat, a Lyme disease awareness runway show held during New York Fashion Week. The event was organised in collaboration with Project Lyme, Global Lyme Alliance and the LymeLight Foundation.

== Discography ==
Year	Title	Format	Notes	Ref
2016	Freckled Angels	Album	Debut solo album	
2016	"Jessica"	Single	With Jimmy Sharp	
2018	"Girls!"	Single		
2018	"Blind Eyed"	Single	With Sam Tompkins	
2018	"Children of the Moon"	Single		
2019	"Humble"	Single	With Eden Nash	
2019	"It's Alright"	Single	With The Big Push	
2019	The Tale of Jenny & Screech	EP	Released 18 September; self-released	
2019	"Money Game"	Single		
2019	"How to Be Me"	Single	With Chinchilla	
2020	Demos (Do Not Share), Vol 1	EP	Released 29 April; self-released	
2020	"Sweet Little Lady"	Single	With The Big Push	
2020	Demos (Do Not Share), Vol 2	EP	Released 14 October; self-released	
2021	"Precious"	EP Track	With The Big Push; Can Do Will Do	
2021	"Round Town (Skit)"	Track	With Chinchilla; Moon Maintenance for Dummies	
2021	"Chalk Outlines"	Single	With Chinchilla	
2022	"Power"	Single		
2022	"Violet's Tale"	Single	Released 29 July; two-track release	
2022	"Hi Ren"	Single	Released 15 December	
2023	Gutter (Ren Remix)	Remix	Venbee featuring Ren	
2023	"Down On the Beat"	Single	With Viktus	
2023	Sick Boi	Album	Second solo album; multiple tracks released as singles	
2024	"Mackay"	Single		
2024	"Troubles"	Single		
2024	"Pain Salesmen"	Single	Prof featuring Ren	
2024	"Baggage"	Single	Chris Webby featuring Ren; Last Wednesday	
2024	"Kujo Beat Down"	Single		
2024	"Fentanyl"	Single	Knox Hill featuring Ren; Chaos Theory 2	
2024	"Money Ties"	Single		
2024	"Slaughter House"	Single	With Kit	
2025	"What Does Your Love Look Like?"	Single	Token featuring Ren; I'm Not Supposed To Be Here	
2025	"Two's on a Cigarette"	EP Track	With The Skinner Brothers; featuring Sahaji	
2025	Sick Sick Soul, (Vol. 1).	EP	With The Skinner Brothers	
2025	"Pink Heineken"	EP Track	With The Skinner Brothers; featuring Megan Notcheva	
2026	Asylum	Album	As Inpatient, with Chris Webby and JP On Da Track	
2026	Vincent's Tale	EP	Expanded to 11 tracks on 29 January	
