= Sick Boi =

Studio album by Ren
- Released: 13 October 2023
- Length: 64:57
- Label: The Other Songs
- Producer: Ren Gill

Ren chronology
Violet's Tale (2022)	Sick Boi (2023)

Singles from Sick Boi
- 1. "The Hunger" Released: 22 September 2022; 2. "Genesis" Released: 13 October 2022; 3. "What You Want" Released: 3 November 2022; 4. "Sick Boi" Released: 19 January 2023; 5. "Illest of Our Time" Released: 29 March 2023; 6. "Animal Flow" Released: 4 May 2023; 7. "Suicide" Released: 8 June 2023; 8. "Murderer" Released: 21 July 2023; 9. "Love Music, Pt. 4" Released: 17 August 2023; 10. "Down on the Beat" Released: 24 August 2023; 11. "Masochist" Released: 31 August 2023; 12. "Lost All Faith" Released: 7 September 2023

Sick Boi is the second studio album by Welsh artist Ren. It was released on 13 October 2023 through The Other Songs as his first studio album in nearly eight years, following Freckled Angels (2016).

== Background ==
Sick Boi is a self-written and self-produced record that sees Gill "drawing from a lot of things that [he has] worked on over the years". He personally described it as a "victory" over his health and viewed it as empowering to "pull something off like this", as he spent the previous year living in Canada to undergo medical treatment for his chronic diseases. The album delves into the "agony of his struggles" and offers listeners a "perspective that most people don't have". Gill challenged himself to create a "hiphop only" record which came out as a "kaleidoscopic, genre-spanning effort" that focuses on his personal struggles, according to the rapper. In an interview with NPR, Gill revealed that the project was partially inspired by a "hyper-polarization" that is going on in the world according to him, leading to a "division" that hinders humans "to progress as a species". Talking to the Official Charts Company, Gill named "The Hunger" and "What You Want" as the oldest tracks on the record that he had sitting around "for a while". However, when he tied the record together, the songs "made sense".

== Critical reception ==
Professional ratings
Review scores
Source	Rating
AllMusic	4/5 stars
And It Don't Stop	A
Clash	7/10
Laut.de	2/5 stars
Louder Than War	5/5 stars

Sick Boi was critically well received, with Robert Christgau hailing Ren as "a rapper whose articulated singsong combines startling clarity with polysyllabic vernacularity" and unlike much of anything he had heard before. Writing for Clash magazine, Robin Murray called the album a difficult but "often inspired" and thoughtfully composed work. Wayne Carey of Louder Than War named Sick Boi as "album of the week", saying that Ren produced "the most ambitious" album they had heard in years. Carey called the project a "mammoth" that offers a "harsh tale" of health.

== Commercial performance ==
On 16 October 2023, this album was placed at number two in the midweek charts with Rick Astley's Are We There Yet? being the number one album in the first chart update that the Official Charts Company released for the week. For most of the remainder of the week, Astley was number one in their updates, with Ren being only 133 sales behind Astley when the update was issued on Wednesday. At that point, it was decided that a £4.99 digital version of Sick Boi would go on sale via Ren's website on the Thursday, with a number of exclusive tracks, securing 4,533 more sales on the last day of tracking and the number one spot when the Official Albums Chart was released on 20 October 2023. In the end, Sick Boi clocked up a sales total of 18,653, including 6,226 CDs, 2,036 LPs and 8,619 digital downloads, putting him 6,996 copies ahead of Astley, who debuted at number two.

== Removal of "Sick Boi" track from streaming platforms ==
After the musician KUJOBEATS issued a copyright claim against the music video of the "Sick Boi" track, Gill released a video on his YouTube channel on 29 August 2024 detailing his perspective on the situation, including the removal of the track from other streaming platforms. Gill claims that the copyright claim is wrongful and that he legally bought an unlimited-use license to a sample through the music-licensing platform BeatStars from KUJOBEATS. Gill also announced a "beat down", a kind of diss track, against KUJOBEATS, which he subsequently released on 5 September 2024. In October, 2025, Ren announced a new release of the Sick Boi track on all streaming services.

== Track listing ==
Sick Boi track listing
No.	Title	Length
1.	"Seven Sins"	4:35
2.	"Sick Boi"	3:13
3.	"Animal Flow"	2:55
4.	"Money Game, Pt. 3"	6:34
5.	"Lost All Faith"	3:49
6.	"Genesis"	2:56
7.	"Murderer"	3:30
8.	"Suicide"	4:09
9.	"Illest of Our Time"	3:10
10.	"Love Music, Pt. 4"	3:24
11.	"Uninvited"	2:54
12.	"What You Want"	3:16
13.	"The Hunger"	2:27
14.	"Down on the Beat"	3:54
15.	"Masochist"	3:23
16.	"Loco"	3:21
17.	"Wicked Ways"	3:15
18.	"Sick Boi, Pt. 2"	4:11
Total length:		64:57

== Charts ==
Chart performance for Sick Boi
Chart (2023)	Peak position
Australian Albums (ARIA)	28
Belgian Albums (Ultratop Flanders)	30
Dutch Albums (Album Top 100)	83
Scottish Albums (OCC)	1
UK Albums (OCC)	1
UK Independent Albums (OCC)	1
UK R&B Albums (OCC)	1
US Billboard 200	137
US Heatseekers Albums (Billboard)	2
US Independent Albums (Billboard)	26
