= Never Gonna Stop (album) =

Live album by Tommy Walker
- Released: 2000
- Recorded: Los Angeles, California
- Genre: Contemporary Christian
- Length: 72:02
- Label: Integrity, Hosanna! Music, Word
- Producer: Tommy Walker, Bob Wilson, Don Moen (Executive), Chris Thomason (Executive)

Never Gonna Stop is an album of Christian worship music by Tommy Walker. The Contemporary Christian album was recorded live Christian Assembly in Los Angeles, California and was released in 2000 by Integrity, Hosanna! Music, and Word. Never Gonna Stop is Hosanna! Music's 100th album featuring Tommy Walker and world-class musicians such as Justo Almario, Bob Wilson, and Jerry Watts, this new release will draw you to your feet and make you hungry for worship. The album captures a new sound of worship and is the perfect recording to celebrate Hosanna! Music's 100th album!

Product ID Number
Title	CD	Tape
Never Gonna Stop	18463	

== Track listing ==
1. "How Good and Pleasant"
2. "Only A God Like You"
3. "He Saved Us To Show His Glory"
4. "Give Us The Sounds"
5. "Jesus, That Name"
6. "When All Is Said And Done"
7. "I Fix My Eyes On You"
8. "Lets Think About Our God"
9. "Where You Are"
10. "I Hide Myself In Thee"
11. "Jerry's Story"
12. "He Knows My Name"
13. "How Could I But Love You"
14. "Never Gonna Stop"

== Credits ==
Producers:

- Tommy Walker
- Bob Wilson

Executive Producers:

- Don Moen
- Chris Thomason

A&R:

- Chris Springer

Worship Leader:

- Tommy Walker - Worship leader

Musicians:

- Bob Wilson - Drums
- Justo Almario - Flute, Saxophone, Percussion, Bass Clarinet
- Alberto Salas – Keyboards, Percussion
- Jerry Watts - Bass
- Tommy Walker – Guitar

Vocals:

- Linda McCrary
- Kristle Murden
- Jimmy "Z" Zavala
- Victor Perez
- Kristina Hamilton

Choir

- Dick Martin
- Bob Ross
- Steven Springer
- Jimmy "Z" Zavala
- Deborah Brown
- Sara Evans
- Kurt Knudson
- Laura Wood
- Susan Bauer Lee
- Alicia Correa
- Cathy Green
- Annette Lopez
- Andrea Rhodes
- Melanie Harrison
- Robert Wong
- Kim Wood
- Chris Brantley
- Norma Abad
- Sarah Hart
- Renee Porter
- Mike Bagasao
- Don Andrues
- David Artuso
- Suzy Avila
- Joy Bagasao
- Diana Bear
- Kent Butler
- Benjamin Chang
- Stephanie Chin
- Susan Christopher
- Tracy Clave
- Terri Cole
- Heather Colon
- Jean Cosby
- Tess Cox
- Shannon Denny
- Rosanna Carla DiLoreto
- LaDonna Macauley
- Natalie Dunbar
- Mindi Ferguson
- Hannah Ford
- Bernie Franklin
- Colleen Frawley
- Jennica Frickman
- Alyssa Gayle
- Patricia Geyling
- Paloma Gibson
- Christy Gonzalez Aden
- Gerry Gonzalez
- Brad Hamilton
- Michelle Harden
- April Brown
- Peter Day
- Andy Evans
- David Haynes

Engineers

- Mark Williams - Monitor Engineer
- Paul Mills - Mixing
- Dan Garcia - Engineer
