= Joe Rush =

British artist (born 1960)

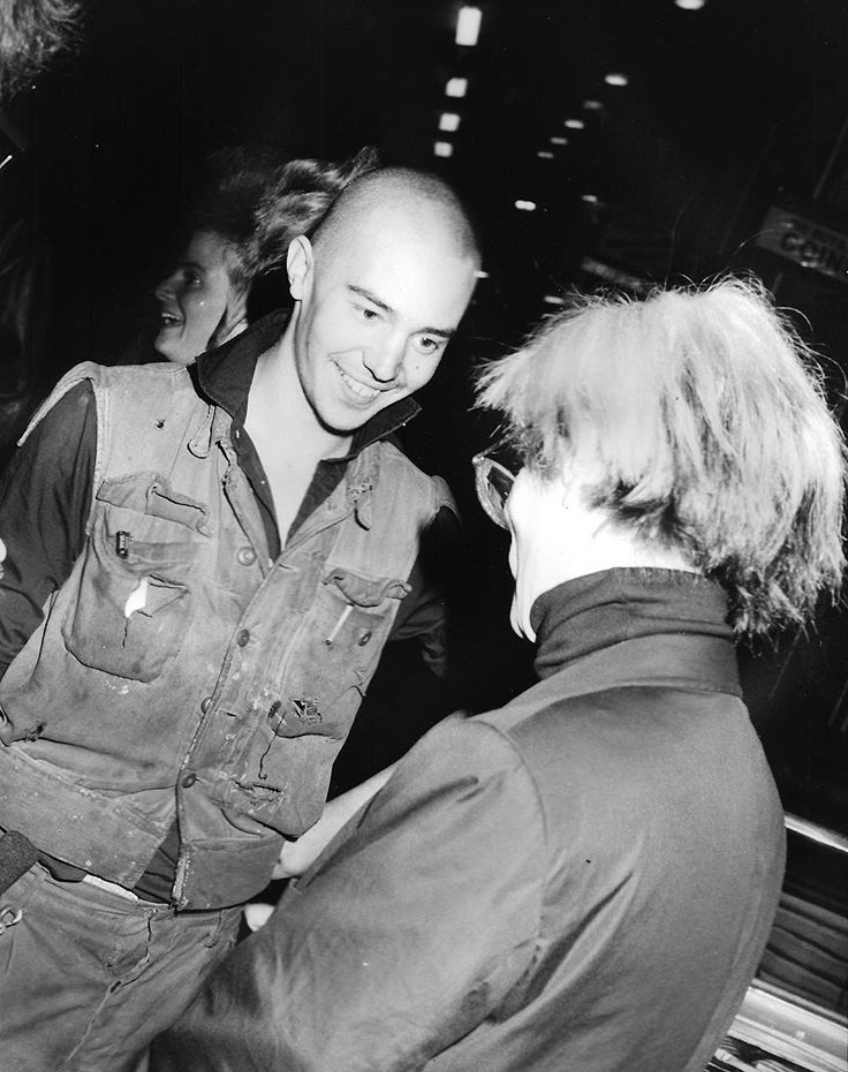
- Joe Rush and Andy Warhol
- Born: 1960 (age 65–66)
- Movement: Mutoid Waste Company
- Website: joerush.com

Joe Rush (born 1960) is a British artist. He is the founder of Mutoid Waste Company, a performance arts collective that has performed at Glastonbury Festival.

== Early life ==
Rush was born in 1960 in London, England.

== Career ==
In 1980, Rush exhibited at The Car Breaker Gallery in Frestonia, London.

In 1984, he founded the Mutoid Waste Company, an underground travelling collective of artists. That same year, he launched the first "Installation Party" in the disused Kings Cross coach station. From then on, he produced installations of his pieces in environments he mutated, occupying derelict warehouses and factories.

Throughout the 1980s, he built techno-industrial sculptures at parties and festivals, and then travelled across both Western and Eastern Europe to continue the work. From making a "car henge" at Glastonbury (stone circle made out of cars), he progressed to using armoured personnel carriers and fighter planes in Germany after the fall of the Berlin Wall.

After leaving Britain for many years, Rush returned to the UK where he and his crew became involved with robotics and animation, as well as organising Mutoid Waste Company projects around the world. He has displayed his art aroun the UK, for example 'X-Ray Ted Mosquito' as part of Liverpool Discovers 2011.

In 2001, Rush participated in Art-Tube, a month long exhibition on a Piccadilly Line London Underground train.

In 2012, Kim Gavin entrusted to Rush the art direction and creation of the vehicles, mobile stages and props of the London Paralympics Closing Ceremony. The aesthetics of the show were praised.

In July 2018, he opened his first solo exhibition entitled 'Stories From the Wasteland' at the Bruton Art Factory in Somerset.

In June 2021, Rush created an installation entitled 'Mount Recyclemore', depicting world leaders attending the G7 conference in Cornwall.

== Collaborations ==
Rush has collaborated with Banksy, Damien Hirst and Vivienne Westwood.

== Gallery ==
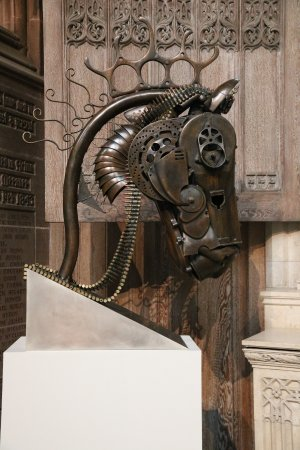
War Horse installation

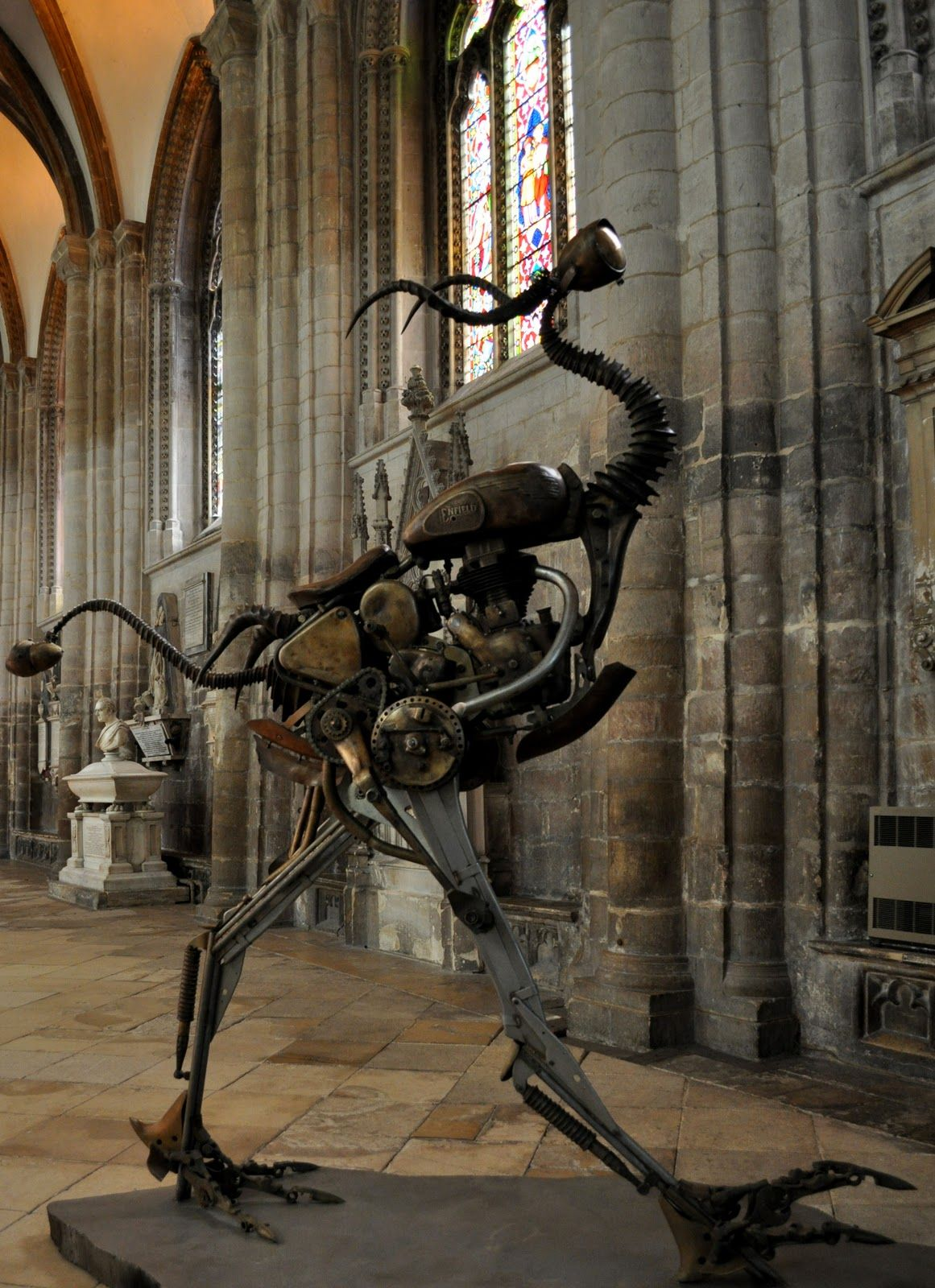
Blunderbird Moa Bike

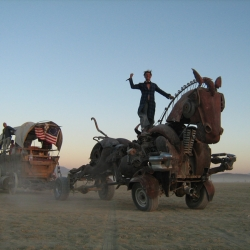
Joe Rush at Burning Man
