= The Skinner Brothers =

English indie rock band

- Origin: London, England
- Genres: Indie rock, Drum and bass, Punk rock, Ska,
- Years active: 2018–present
- Label: Independent
- Members: Zachary Charles Skinner; Fredrick Lindal; Jack Leigh; Kian McCourt
- Website: https://www.theskinnerbrothers.com/

The Skinner Brothers are an English indie rock band formed in London, in 2018.

The band, led by frontman Zachary Skinner, produces their music on their own and markets itself completely independently without a label. Their music draws influences from various genres, such as punk rock, rapping, and Drum and bass.

== History ==
Zac Skinner moved to London in 2011. The band was formed in London in 2018 with the debut single Watchu released in the same year. The single Away Days and the album Soul Boy, Vol. 1 were both released in 2020 followed by tours as support acts with The Libertines, Kasabian, Rat Boy and The Streets.

In 2022, the album Soul Boy II was released leading to greater recognition in England. It reached position 98 in the official UK Album Downloads Charts and 16 in the UK Independent Album Breakers Charts and featured guest contributions by Robert Harvey and Russell Pritchard. The Sun included The Skinner Brothers in their 2022 Artists to Watch list, followed by interviews and radio features.

The band produced further albums and EPs in the following years and toured through the UK. The band's most popular songs, in addition to Away Days, include Prawn Soup and Off My Nuttt from the album Soul Boy IV. One of the band's trademarks since around 2024 has been wearing masks on stage and in music videos.

In October 2025, they announced the release of multiple EPs titled Sick Sick Soul, together with Welsh musician Ren. Sick Sick Soul - Vol 1 reached position 5 on the 27 November 2025 Official Album Downloads Chart, staying inside the top 100 for four weeks. The first single of Volume 1, So The Story Goes, reached position 95 in the official UK Singles Downloads Chart.

== Discography ==
Studio albums

- 25 to Life (2019)
- 27 to Life (2019)
- Soul Boy, Vol. 1 (2020)
- Soul Boy II (2022)
- Soul Boy 3 (2023)
- Soul Boy IV (2024)
- Soul Boy V (2025)

Extended plays

- Iconic (2021)
- Culture Non-Stop (2021)
- Lonedon (2022)
- Skippin' On The Cream (2022)
- 2Lager (2023)
- Death From Above (2023)
- Sugar Boy (Lost Demo EP) (2023)
- Sick Sick Soul (Vol. 1) (with Ren) (2025)
- RAMPAGE (2026)
