= Never Stop =

Never Stop may refer to:

== Songs ==
- "Never Stop" (Echo & the Bunnymen song), a 1983 song
- "Never Stop" (Brand New Heavies song), a 1991 song
- "Never Stop" (Bro'Sis song), a 2003 song
- "Never Stop!", a 1997 song by Every Little Thing from the single "Shapes of Love/Never Stop!"
- "Never Stop", a 2007 song by Hilary Duff from Dignity
- "Never Stop" (Chilly Gonzales song), a 2010 song by Chilly Gonzales

== Other uses ==
- Never Stop EP or The Sound of Echo, an EP by Echo & the Bunnymen
- Never Stop (Planetshakers album), 2006
- Never Stop (The Bad Plus album), 2010
- Never Stop (film), a 2021 film
- Never Stop (EP), a 2025 EP by King Combs
