= Never Gonna Stop (Rick Astley song) =

2023 single by Rick Astley

Single by Rick Astley

from the album Are We There Yet?
- Released: 22 August 2023
- Genre: rhythm and blues
- Length: 3:17
- Label: BMG
- Songwriter: Rick Astley
- Producer: Rick Astley

Rick Astley singles chronology
"Dippin My Feet" (2023)	"Never Gonna Stop" (2023)	"Forever and More" (2023)

Music video
- "Never Gonna Stop" on YouTube

"Never Gonna Stop" is a song written and performed by English singer-songwriter Rick Astley. It was released as the second single from his ninth studio album, Are We There Yet?, on 22 August 2023. The track peaked at number 49 on the UK Official Single Sales Chart in October 2023. In an interview Astley said that the song was inspired by an article he had read about artificial intelligence.

The world is now full of daunting technology and that we need to remain human through it all! Maybe [we could] use some of that technology for good and move forward, we've still got to be human about it, so there you go!

Retropop magazine described the song as a soulful R&B ballad that showcases his distinctive vocals.
