= Mutoid Waste Company =

English performance arts group

- 'Carhenge' at Glastonbury Festival, 1987
- Formation: 1984
- Type: Theatre group
- Location: London, United Kingdom
- Website: Mutoid Waste Company

The Mutoid Waste Company are a performance arts group founded in London, England by Joe Rush and Robin Cooke in collaboration with Alan P Scott and Joshua Bowler. It started in the early 1980s, emerging from Frestonia's 'Car Breaker Gallery'. They are probably best known for their recycled art installations at Glastonbury Festival and refer to themselves as the Mutoids.

Influenced by the film Mad Max and the popular Judge Dredd comics, they specialised in organising illegal free parties in London throughout the 1980s, driven at first by eclectic assortments of fringe music such as psychedelic rock and dub reggae, but then embracing the burgeoning acid house music movement by the late 1980s.

== History ==
Described as "part street theatre, part art show and part traveling circus" in the 1986 LWT documentary South of Watford., the group became famous for building giant welded sculptures from waste materials and for customising broken down cars, as well as making large scale murals in the disused buildings where they held their parties.

In 1989, after a number of police raids on their warehouse in King's Cross, they left the country and travelled to Berlin, Germany where they became notorious for building giant sculptures out of old machinery and car parts, one of which was 'Käferman', a giant human figure with a Volkswagen Beetle for its chest, offering a Bird Of Peace sculpture that overlooked the Berlin Wall towards East Berlin and the regime of East Germany. They had a collection of scrap military vehicles, including a Russian MiG 21 fighter aircraft which 'followed' them around wherever they went, and a painted tank known as "the Pink Panzer".

Lady Emma Herbert, daughter of Henry Herbert, 17th Earl of Pembroke, met the Mutoids at about this time. They taught her acrobatic skills and she toured Europe with them, which was the beginning of her career as a circus trapeze artist.

In 1991, the Mutoids travelled to Santarcangelo di Romagna, Italy where they set up a scrap village called Mutonia and continued working, displaying and performing at squats and libertarian celebrations in the Emilia-Romagna region. A community still exists.

In 2009, the Mutoids held an exhibition Mutate Britain at their yard under the Westway in West London.

In recent years, the Mutoids have appeared at a number of British festivals and arts events, with displays of their distinctive vehicle sculptures, and they were a key part of the closing ceremony for the 2012 Summer Paralympics.

The Mutoids were also celebrated in a BBC Four documentary I Am A Mutoid: A Glastonbury Hero in June 2021.

== See also ==
- Spiral Tribe
