= List of Official Record Store Chart number ones from the 2020s =

The Official Record Store Chart is a weekly music chart based on physical sales of albums in almost 100 independent record stores in the United Kingdom, such as Rough Trade, Rounder Records, Jumbo and Sound It Out. It is compiled by the Official Charts Company (OCC), and each week's number one is first announced on Friday evenings on the OCC's official website.

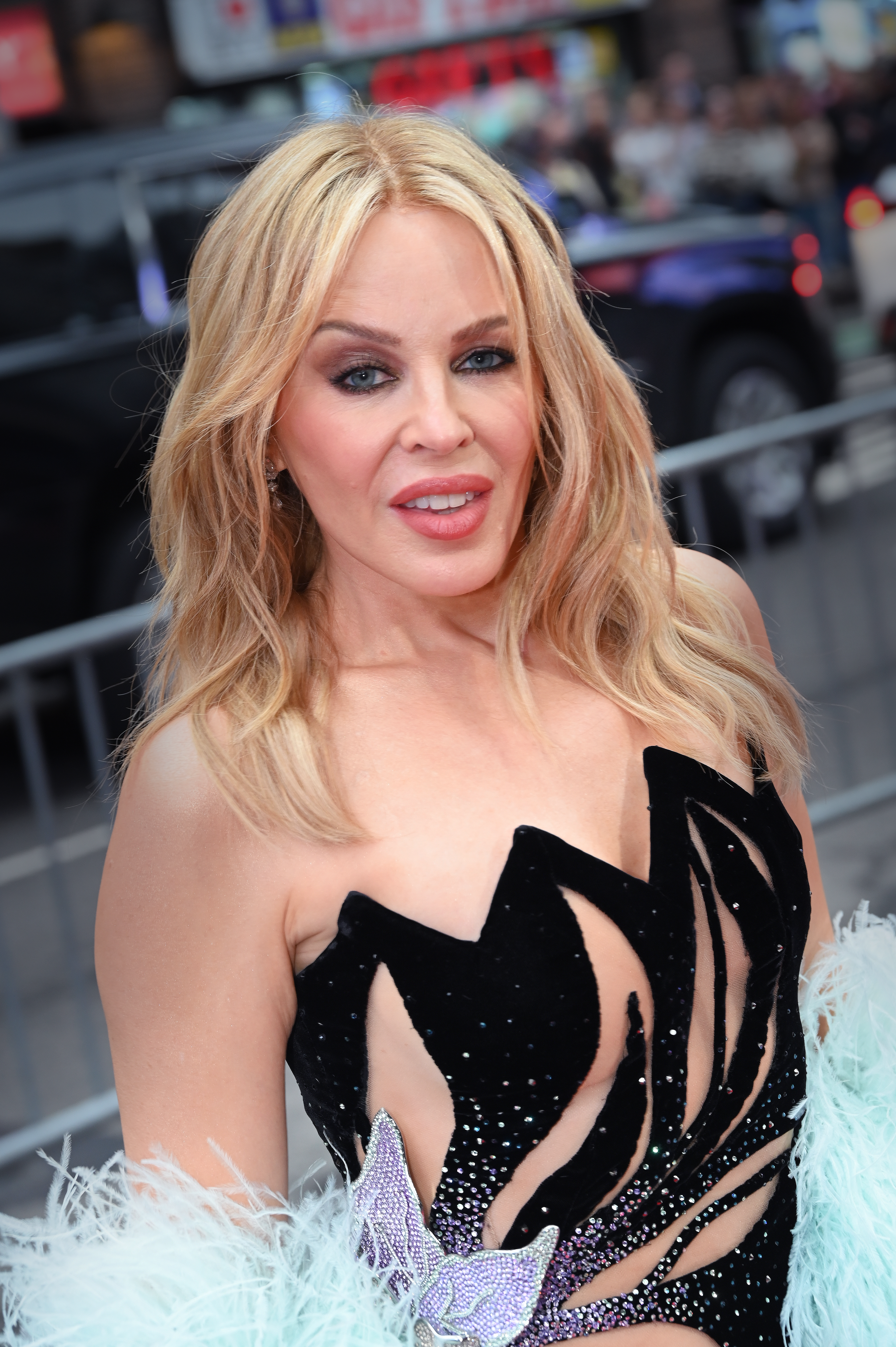
Kylie Minogue holds the record for the most number-one albums during the decade

== Number ones ==
Key
No.	nth album to top the Official Record Store Chart
re	Return of an album to number one
†	Best-selling album of the year in record stores

No.	Artist (Note: The artist, album, date of reaching number one and number of weeks at number one are those given by the OCC.)	Album	Record label (Note: The record labels are those given by the OCC.)	Reached number one	Weeks at number one
2020
327	Fleetwood Mac	Rumours	Rhino/Warner	3 January 2020	1
re	Stormzy	Heavy is the Head	Atlantic/Merky	10 January 2020	1
328	Easy Life	Junk Food	Island	17 January 2020	1
329	Bombay Bicycle Club	Everything Else Has Gone Wrong	Mmm...	24 January 2020	1
330	Twin Atlantic	Power	Virgin	31 January 2020	1
331	Blossoms	Foolish Loving Spaces	EMI	7 February 2020	1
332	Oh Wonder	No One Else Can Wear Your Crown	Island	14 February 2020	1
333	Tame Impala	The Slow Rush	Fiction	21 February 2020	1
334	King Krule	Man Alive!	XL Recordings	28 February 2020	1
335	Caribou	Suddenly	City Slang	6 March 2020	1
336	Jonathan Wilson	Dixie Blur	Bella Union	13 March 2020	1
337	Circa Waves	Sad Happy	Prolifica	20 March 2020	1
338	Baxter Dury	The Night Chancers	PIAS Le Label	27 March 2020	1
339	Kenny Rogers	The Best of Kenny Rogers	EMI Gold	3 April 2020	1
340	Pigs Pigs Pigs Pigs Pigs Pigs Pigs	Viscerals	Rocket Recordings	10 April 2020	2
341	Gerry Cinnamon	The Bonny	Little Runaway	24 April 2020	1
342	BC Camplight	Shortly After Takeoff	Bella Union	1 May 2020	1
343	The Strokes	The New Abnormal	Cult	8 May 2020	1
344	Mark Lanegan	Straight Songs of Sorrow	Heavenly	15 May 2020	1
345	Jason Isbell and the 400 Unit	Reunions	Southeastern	22 May 2020	1
346	Tim Burgess	I Love the New Sky	Bella Union	29 May 2020	1
347	Christine and the Queens	La vita nuova (EP)	Because Music	5 June 2020	1
348	Sports Team	Deep Down Happy	Big Desert/Island	12 June 2020	1
349	Liam Gallagher	MTV Unplugged (Live at Hull City Hall)	Warner	19 June 2020	1
350	Phoebe Bridgers	Punisher	Dead Oceans	26 June 2020	1
351	Khruangbin	Mordechai	Dead Oceans	3 July 2020	1
352	Dream Wife	So When You Gonna...	Lucky Number	10 July 2020	1
353	DMA's	The Glow	Infectious Music	17 July 2020	1
354	Jarv Is	Beyond the Pale	Rough Trade	24 July 2020	1
355	Neck Deep	All Distortions Are Intentional	Hopeless	31 July 2020	1
356	Fontaines D.C.	A Hero's Death	Partisan	7 August 2020	1
357	Glass Animals	Dreamland	Polydor	14 August 2020	1
358	Sea Girls	Open Up Your Head	Polydor	21 August 2020	1
359	Bright Eyes	Down in the Weeds, Where the World Once Was	Dead Oceans	28 August 2020	1
360	David Bowie	ChangesNowBowie	Parlophone	4 September 2020	1
361	Declan McKenna	Zeros	Columbia	11 September 2020	1
362	Doves	The Universal Want	Virgin	18 September 2020	1
363	Run the Jewels	RTJ4	BMG	25 September 2020	1
364	Idles	Ultra Mono †	Partisan	2 October 2020	1
365	Working Men's Club	Working Men's Club	Heavenly	9 October 2020	1
366	Travis	10 Songs	BMG	16 October 2020	1
367	The Vamps	Cherry Blossom	EMI	23 October 2020	1
368	Nothing But Thieves	Moral Panic	RCA	30 October 2020	1
369	Dizzee Rascal	E3 AF	Dirtee Stank	6 November 2020	1
370	Ólafur Arnalds	Some Kind of Peace	Mercury Classics	13 November 2020	1
371	AC/DC	Power Up	Columbia	20 November 2020	1
372	The Cribs	Night Network	Sonic Blew	27 November 2020	1
373	Gary Barlow	Music Played by Humans	Polydor	4 December 2020	1
374	Yungblud	Weird!	Interscope	11 December 2020	1
375	Jamie Cullum	The Pianoman at Christmas	Island	18 December 2020	1
376	Paul McCartney	McCartney III	EMI	25 December 2020	1
2021
377	Taylor Swift	Folklore	Republic	1 January 2021	1
378	King Geedorah	Take Me to Your Leader	Big Dada	8 January 2021	1
379	Viagra Boys	Welfare Jazz	Year0001	15 January 2021	1
380	You Me At Six	Suckapunch	Underdog	22 January 2021	1
381	Bring Me the Horizon	Post Human: Survival Horror	RCA	29 January 2021	1
382	Arlo Parks	Collapsed in Sunbeams	Transgressive	5 February 2021	1
383	Black Country, New Road	For the First Time	Ninja Tune	12 February 2021	1
384	Slowthai	Tyron	Method	19 February 2021	1
385	Mogwai	As the Love Continues	Rock Action	26 February 2021	1
386	Architects	For Those That Wish to Exist	Epitaph	5 March 2021	1
387	Arab Strap	As Days Get Dark	Rock Action	12 March 2021	1
388	Tom Grennan	Evering Road	Insanity	19 March 2021	1
389	Lana Del Rey	Chemtrails over the Country Club	Polydor	26 March 2021	1
390	Ben Howard	Collections from the Whiteout	Island	2 April 2021	1
391	The Snuts	W.L.	Parlophone	9 April 2021	1
392	Dry Cleaning	New Long Leg	4AD	16 April 2021	1
393	London Grammar	Californian Soil	Ministry of Sound	23 April 2021	1
394	Tom Jones	Surrounded By Time	EMI	30 April 2021	1
395	Royal Blood	Typhoons	Warner	7 May 2021	1
396	Squid	Bright Green Field	Warp	14 May 2021	1
397	St. Vincent	St. Vincent	Loma Vista	21 May 2021	1
398	My Bloody Valentine	Loveless	Creation	28 May 2021	1
399	Easy Life	Life's a Beach	Island	4 June 2021	1
400	Wolf Alice	Blue Weekend	Dirty Hit	11 June 2021	1
401	Noel Gallagher's High Flying Birds	Back the Way We Came: Vol. 1 (2011–2021)	Sour Mash	18 June 2021	1
402	Nick Cave & Warren Ellis	Carnage	Goliath	25 June 2021	1
403	Jack Savoretti	Europiana	EMI	2 July 2021	1
404	Snapped Ankles	Forest of Your Problems	The Leaf Label	9 July 2021	1
405	Inhaler	It Won't Always Be Like This	Polydor	16 July 2021	1
406	Billie Eilish	Happier Than Ever	Intescope	6 August 2021	1
407	Caroline Polachek	Pang	Columbia	13 August 2021	1
408	Jungle	Loving in Stereo	Caiola	20 August 2021	1
409	Villagers	Fever Dreams	Domino	27 August 2021	1
410	Maisie Peters	You Signed Up for This	Gingerbread Man	3 September 2021	1
411	Little Simz	Sometimes I Might Be Introvert	Age 101	10 September 2021	1
412	The Vaccines	Back in Love City	Super Easy	17 September 2021	1
413	Jordan Rakei	What We Call Life	Ninja Tune	24 September 2021	1
414	Public Service Broadcasting	Bright Magic	PIAS	1 October 2021	1
415	The Script	Tales from the Script: Greatest Hits	Sony Music	8 October 2021	1
416	Sam Fender	Seventeen Going Under	Polydor	15 October 2021	1
417	Joy Crookes	Skin	Insanity / Speakerbox	22 October 2021	1
418	Biffy Clyro	The Myth of the Happily Ever After	Warner	29 October 2021	1
419	Richard Ashcroft	Acoustic Hymns Vol 1	BMG	5 November 2021	1
420	Radiohead	Kid A Mnesia	XL Recordings	12 November 2021	1
421	Damon Albarn	The Nearer the Fountain, More Pure the Stream Flows	Transgressive	19 November 2021	1
422	Adele	30	Columbia	26 November 2021	1
re	Jamie Cullum	The Pianoman at Christmas	Island	3 December 2021	1
423	JLS	2.0	BMG	10 December 2021	1
424	King Krule	You Heat Me Up, You Cool Me Down	XL Recordings	17 December 2021	1
425	Daft Punk	Discovery	Daft Life	24 December 2021	1
426	Madlib	Sound Ancestors	Madlib Invazion	31 December 2021	1
2022
427	Kylie Minogue	Disco	BMG	7 January 2022	1
428	Twin Atlantic	Transparency	Staple Diet	14 January 2022	1
429	The Wombats	Fix Yourself, Not the World	The Wombats	21 January 2022	1
430	Yard Act	The Overload	Island	28 January 2022	1
431	Don Broco	Amazing Things	SharpTone	4 February 2022	1
432	Bastille	Give Me the Future	Virgin	11 February 2022	1
433	Frank Turner	FTHC	Polydor	18 February 2022	1
434	Sea Power	Everything Was Forever	Golden Chariot	25 February 2022	1
435	Central Cee	23	Central Cee	4 March 2022	1
436	Marillion	An Hour Before It's Dark	earMUSIC	11 March 2022	1
437	Rex Orange County	Who Cares	Columbia	18 March 2022	1
438	Feeder	Torpedo	Big Teeth	25 March 2022	1
439	Placebo	Never Let Me Go	So Recordings	1 April 2022	1
440	Fatherson	Normal Fears	Easy Life	8 April 2022	1
441	Wet Leg	Wet Leg	Domino	15 April 2022	1
442	Digga D	Noughty By Nature	CGM / EGA	22 April 2022	1
443	Fontaines DC	Skinty Fia	Partisan	29 April 2022	1
444	Blossoms	Ribbon Around the Bomb	EMI	6 May 2022	1
445	Sigrid	How to Let Go	Island	13 May 2022	1
446	Bear's Den	Blue Hours	Communion	20 May 2022	1
447	Raw Data Feel	Everything Everything	Everything Everything	27 May 2022	1
448	Liam Gallagher	C'Mon You Know	Warner	3 June 2022	1
449	Michael Head & the Red Elastic Band	Dear Scott	Modern Sky	10 June 2022	1
450	George Ezra	Gold Rush Kid	Columbia	17 June 2022	1
451	Foals	Life Is Yours	Warner	24 June 2022	1
452	Porcupine Tree	Closure/Continuation	Music for Nations	1 July 2022	1
453	Paolo Nutini	Last Night in the Bittersweet	Atlantic	8 July 2022	1
454	James Bay	Leap	EMI	15 July 2022	1
455	Deaf Havana	The Present Is a Foreign Land	So Recordings	22 July 2022	1
456	Jamie T	The Theory of Whatever	Polydor	4 August 2022	1
457	The Cribs	Men's Needs, Women's Needs, Whatever	Sonic Blew	11 August 2022	1
re	Glass Animals	Dreamland	Polydor	18 August 2022	1
458	Kasabian	The Alchemist's Euphoria	Columbia	25 August 2022	1
459	Oasis	Be Here Now	Big Brother	1 September 2022	1
460	Embrace	How to Be a Person Like Other People	Mo'betta	8 September 2022	1
461	Yungblud	Yungblud	Interscope	15 September 2022	1
462	Robbie Williams	XXV	Columbia	22 September 2022	1
463	Suede	Autofiction	BMG	29 September 2022	1
464	Sports Team	Gulp!	Island	6 October 2022	1
465	Craig David	22	BMG	13 October 2022	1
466	Easy Life	Maybe in Another Life..	Island	20 October 2022	1
467	The Big Moon	Here Is Everything	Fiction	27 October 2022	1
468	Arctic Monkeys	The Car	Domino	3 November 2022	1
469	Tom Odell	Best Day of My Life	UROK/Mtheory	10 November 2022	1
470	First Aid Kit	Palomino	Columbia	17 November 2022	1
471	Louis Tomlinson	Faith in the Future	BMG	24 November 2022	1
472	Dermot Kennedy	Sonder	Island	1 December 2022	1
473	Stormzy	This Is What I Mean	0207/Merky	8 December 2022	1
474	Olly Murs	Marry Me	EMI	15 December 2022	1
475	Sam Ryder	There's Nothing But Space Man	Parlophone	22 December 2022	1
re	Arctic Monkeys	The Car	Domino	29 December 2022	3
2023
476	Gabrielle Aplin	Phosphorescent	Never Fade	19 January 2023	1
477	Gaz Coombes	Turn the Car Around	Hot Fruit	26 January 2023	1
478	The Reytons	What's Rock and Roll?	The Reytons	2 February 2023	2
479	Raye	My 21st Century Blues	Human Re Sources	16 February 2023	1
480	You Me at Six	Truth Decay	Underdog	23 February 2023	1
481	Inhaler	Cuts & Bruises	Polydor	2 March 2023	1
482	Gracie Abrams	Good Riddance	Interscope	9 March 2023	1
483	Slowthai	Ugly	Interscope	16 March 2023	1
484	Sleaford Mods	UK Grim	Rough Trade	23 March 2023	1
485	All Time Low	Tell Me I'm Alive	Parlophone	30 March 2023	1
486	Lana Del Rey	Did You Know That There's a Tunnel Under Ocean Blvd	Polydor	6 April 2023	1
487	DMA's	How Many Dreams?	I Oh You/Mushroom Group	13 April 2023	1
488	Ellie Goulding	Higher Than Heaven	Polydor	20 April 2023	1
489	Metallica	72 Seasons	Vertigo	27 April 2023	1
490	The 1975	Live with the BBC Philharmonic Orchestra	Dirty Hit	4 May 2023	1
491	The Lottery Winners	Anxiety Replacement Therapy	Modern Sky	11 May 2023	1
492	Tom Meighan	The Reckoning	Destruct	18 May 2023	1
493	Alison Goldfrapp	The Love Invention	Skint	25 May 2023	1
494	Lewis Capaldi	Broken by Desire to Be Heavenly Sent	EMI	1 June 2023	1
495	Arlo Parks	My Soft Machine	Transgressive	8 June 2023	1
496	Noel Gallagher's High Flying Birds	Council Skies	Sour Mash	15 June 2023	1
497	James	Be Opened by the Wonderful	Nothing but Love Music	22 June 2023	1
498	Tom Grennan	What Ifs & Maybes	Insanity	29 June 2023	1
499	Maisie Peters	The Good Witch	Atlantic/Gingerbread Man	6 July 2023	1
500	Olivia Dean	Messy	Capitol	13 July 2023	1
501	Gabriels	Angels & Queens P1	Parlophone	20 July 2023	1
502	Rita Ora	You & I	BMG	27 July 2023	1
503	Blur	The Ballad of Darren	Parlophone	3 August 2023	1
504	Anne-Marie	Unhealthy	Atlantic	10 August 2023	1
505	The Sherlocks	People Like You and Me	Teddy Boy	17 August 2023	1
506	The Hives	The Death of Randy Fitzsimmons	Disques Hives	24 August 2023	1
507	The View	Exorcism of Youth	Cooking Vinyl	31 August 2023	1
508	Claire Richards	Euphoria	Edsel	7 September 2023	1
509	Royal Blood	Back to the Water Below	Warner	14 September 2023	1
510	The Coral	Sea of Mirrors	Modern Sky	21 September 2023	1
511	Busted	Greatest Hits 2.0	Juno Music	28 September 2023	1
512	Kylie Minogue	Tension	BMG	5 October 2023	1
513	Jorja Smith	Falling or Flying	FAMM	12 October 2023	1
514	Roger Waters	The Dark Side of the Moon Redux	Cooking Vinyl	19 October 2023	1
515	Rick Astley	Are We There Yet?	BMG	26 October 2023	1
516	Bombay Bicycle Club	My Big Day	AWAL	2 November 2023	1
517	OMD	Bauhaus Staircase	100%	9 November 2023	1
518	Oasis	Masterplan	Creation	16 November 2023	1
519	Passenger	All the Little Lights 2023 re-recording	Cooking Vinyl	23 November 2023	1
520	Madness	Theatre of the Absurd Presents C'est la Vie	BMG	30 November 2023	1
521	Kylie Minogue	Kylie	Cherry Red/PWL	7 December 2023	1
522	Duran Duran	Pop Trash	Hollywood	14 December 2023	1
re	Louis Tomlinson	Faith in the Future	BMG	21 December 2023	1
523	X-Ray Spex	Conscious Consumer	Do Yourself In	28 December 2023	1
2024
524	Rolling Stones	Hackney Diamonds	Polydor	4 January 2024	1
525	The Mary Wallopers	Irish Rock N Roll	BC Recordings	11 January 2024	1
526	Shed Seven	A Matter of Time	Cooking Vinyl	18 January 2024	1
527	D-Block Europe	Rolling Stone	D-Block Europe	25 January 2024	1
528	Neck Deep	Neck Deep	Hopeless	1 February 2024	1
529	The Reytons	Ballad of a Bystander	The Reytons	8 February 2024	1
530	The Last Dinner Party	Prelude to Ecstasy	Island	15 February 2024	1
531	Declan McKenna	What Happened to the Beach?	Columbia	22 February 2024	1
532	Idles	Tangk	Partisan	29 February 2024	1
533	The Snuts	Millennials	Happy Artist	7 March 2024	1
534	Liam Gallagher and John Squire	Liam Gallagher John Squire	Warner	14 March 2024	1
535	Bleachers	Bleachers	Dirty Hit	21 March 2024	1
536	Kid Kapichi	There Goes the Neighbourhood	Spinefarm	28 March 2024	1
537	Starsailor	Where the Wild Things Grow	Starsailor	4 April 2024	1
538	Ride	Interplay	Wichita	11 April 2024	1
539	The Libertines	All Quiet on the Eastern Esplanade	EMI	18 April 2024	1
540	James	Yummy	Nothing But Love	25 April 2024	1
541	Blur	Parklife	Food	2 May 2024	1
542	Pet Shop Boys	Nonetheless	Parlophone	9 May 2024	1
543	Frank Turner	Undefeated	Xtra Mile	16 May 2024	1
544	Jordan Rakei	The Loop	Decca	23 May 2024	1
545	Zayn	Room Under the Stairs	Republic	30 May 2024	1
546	Twenty One Pilots	Clancy	Atlantic/Fueled By Ramen	6 June 2024	1
547	Crowded House	Gravity Stairs	BMG	13 June 2024	1
548	Charli XCX	Brat	Atlantic	20 June 2024	1
549	Sea Girls	Midnight Butterflies	Alt	27 June 2024	1
550	Gracie Abrams	The Secret of Us	Interscope	4 July 2024	1
551	Dua Lipa	Future Nostalgia	Warner	11 July 2024	1
552	Kasabian	Happenings	Columbia	18 July 2024	1
553	Travis	L.A. Times	BMG	25 July 2024	1
554	Olivia Rodrigo	Guts	Geffen	1 August 2024	1
555	Sam Tompkins	Hi, My Name Is Insecure	Island	8 August 2024	1
556	Chappell Roan	The Rise and Fall of a Midwest Princess	Island	15 August 2024	1
557	Beabadoobee	This Is How Tomorrow Moves	Dirty Hit	22 August 2024	1
558	The Script	Satellites	BMG	29 August 2024	1
559	Fontaines D.C.	Romance	XL	5 September 2024	1
560	Oasis	Definitely Maybe	Big Brother	12 September 2024	1
561	Fat Dog	Woof.	Domino	19 September 2024	1
562	Snow Patrol	The Forest Is the Path	Polydor	26 September 2024	1
563	Blossoms	Gary	ODD SK Recordings	3 October 2024	1
564	Shed Seven	Liquid Gold	Cooking Vinyl	10 October 2024	1
565	James Bay	Changes All the Time	EMI	17 October 2024	1
re	Charli XCX	Brat	Atlantic	24 October 2024	1
566	Kylie Minogue	Tension II	BMG	31 October 2024	1
567	Courteeners	Pink Cactus Café	Ignition	7 November 2024	1
568	The Cure	Songs of a Lost World	Polydor	14 November 2024	1
569	Michael Ball & Alfie Boe	Together At Home	Tag8 Music	21 November 2024	1
570	Flo	Access All Areas	Island	28 November 2024	1
571	Michael Kiwanuka	Small Change	Polydor	5 December 2024	1
572	U2	How to Re-Assemble an Atomic Bomb	Island	12 December 2024	1
573	White Denim	12	Bella Union	19 December 2024	1
574	The Reytons	Clifton Park	The Reytons	26 December 2024	1
2025
575	Kneecap	Fine Art	Heavenly	2 January 2025	1
576	Ed Sheeran	+−=÷× (Tour Collection)	Asylum	9 January 2025	1
577	Elton John	Diamonds	Mercury	16 January 2025	1
578	Franz Ferdinand	The Human Fear	Domino	23 January 2025	1
579	Pastel	Souls in Motion	Spirit of Spike Island	30 January 2025	1
580	FKA Twigs	Eusexua	Young	6 February 2025	1
581	Maribou State	Hallucinating Love	Ninja Tune	13 February 2025	1
582	Inhaler	Open Wide	Polydor	20 February 2025	1
583	The Wombats	Oh! The Ocean	The Wombats	27 February 2025	1
584	Sam Fender	People Watching	Polydor	6 March 2025	1
585	Architects	The Sky, the Earth & All Between	Epitaph	13 March 2025	1
586	HotWax	Hot Shock	Marathon Artists	20 March 2025	1
587	Steven Wilson	The Overview	Fiction	27 March 2025	1
588	The Lottery Winners	KOKO	Modern Sky	3 April 2025	1
589	The Darkness	Dreams on Toast	Cooking Vinyl	10 April 2025	1
590	Black Country New Road	Forever Howlong	Ninja Tune	17 April 2025	1
591	Sam Fender	Me and the Dog	Polydor	24 April 2025	1
592	Mk.gee	Two Star & the Dream Police	Many Hats	1 May 2025	1
593	Stereophonics	Make 'Em Laugh, Make 'Em Cry, Make 'Em Wait	EMI	8 May 2025	1
594	James	Live at the Acropolis	Nothing But Love Music	15 May 2025	1
595	The Kooks	Never/Know	Lonely Cat	22 May 2025	1
596	The Sherlocks	Everything Must Make Sense	Teddyboy	29 May 2025	1
597	Sports Team	Boys These Days	Bright Antenna Distiller	5 June 2025	1
598	Matt Berninger	Get Sunk	Concord	12 June 2025	1
599	Little Simz	Lotus	AWAL/Little Simz	19 June 2025	1
600	James Marriott	Don't Tell the Dog	AWAL/Marriot Music	26 June 2025	1
601	Yungblud	Idols	Capitol	3 July 2025	2
602	Hard-Fi	Stars of CCTV	Atlantic/Necessary	17 July 2025	1
603	Wet Leg	Moisturizer	Domino	24 July 2025	1
604	Billie Marten	Dog Eared	Fiction	31 July 2025	1
605	The K's	Pretty on the Internet	LAB	7 August 2025	1
606	The New Eves	The New Eve Is Rising	LAB	14 August 2025	1
607	The Royston Club	Songs for the Spine	Modern Sky/Run On	21 August 2025	1
608	Tom Grennan	Everywhere I Went, Led Me to Where I Didn't Want to Be	Insanity	28 August 2025	1
609	Laufey	A Matter of Time	Vingolf	4 September 2025	1
610	CMAT	Euro-Country	AWAL/CMATBABY	11 September 2025	1
611	Suede	Antidepressants	BMG	18 September 2025	1
612	Jade	That's Showbiz Baby	RCA	25 September 2025	1
613	Biffy Clyro	Futique	Warner	2 October 2025	1
614	Olivia Dean	The Art of Loving	Capitol	9 October 2025	1
615	James Morrison	Fight Another Day	Cooking Vinyl	16 October 2025	1
616	Richard Ashcroft	Lovin' You	Richard Ashcroft/RPA	23 October 2025	1
617	The Last Dinner Party	From the Pyre	Island	30 October 2025	1
618	Sigrid	There's Always More That I Could Say	EMI	6 November 2025	1
619	The Rock Orchestra	Classics - Vol.1	Mega Label	13 November 2025	1
620	Lady Gaga	Mayhem	Polydor	20 November 2025	1
621	5 Seconds of Summer	Everyone's a Star!	EMI	27 November 2025	1
622	Aerosmith/Yungblud	One More Time	Island	4 December 2025	1
623	Jessie J	Don't Tease Me with a Good Time	DAP	11 December 2025	1
624	Kylie Minogue	Kylie Christmas (Fully Wrapped)	Rhino	18 December 2025	1
625	Pink Floyd	Wish You Were Here	Sony	25 December 2025	1
2026
626	Geese	Getting Killed	Partisan/Play It Again Sam	1 January 2026	3
627	Blue	Reflections	Cooking Vinyl	22 January 2026	1
628	Elles Bailey	Can’t Take My Story Away	Cooking Vinyl	29 January 2026	1
629	Callum Beattie	Indi	Cooking Vinyl	5 February 2026	1
630	Lily Allen	West End Girl	BMG	12 February 2026	1
631	Ist Ist	Dagger	Kind Violence	19 February 2026	1
632	Kylie Minogue	Tension Tour-Live 2025	BMG	26 February 2026	1
633	Mumford & Sons	Prizefighter	Island	5 March 2026	1
634	Mitski	Nothing's About to Happen to Me	Dead Oceans	12 March 2026	1
635	Katherine Priddy	These Frightening Machines	Cooking Vinyl	19 March 2026	1
636	James Blake	Trying Times	Good Boy	26 March 2026	1
637	Jane McDonald	Living the Dream	Jeanie Productions	2 April 2026	1
638	Pet Needs	Elbows Out This is Capitalism	Xtra Mile	9 April 2026	1
639	Dermot Kennedy	The Weight of the Woods	Island	16 April 2026	1
640	Jack Savoretti	We Will Always Be the Way We Were	Lanza Music	23 April 2026	1
641	Jessie Ware	Superbloom	EMI	30 April 2026	1
642	Noah Kahan	The Great Divide	Mercury	7 May 2026	1
643	Melanie C	Sweat	Red Girl	14 May 2026	1
644	Reverend and the Makers	Is This How Happiness Feels?	Distiller	21 May 2026	1
645	Gene	Apollo	Costermonger	28 May 2026	1
646	Maisie Peters	Florescence	Atlantic/Gingerbread Man	4 June 2026	1
647	Paul McCartney	The Boys of Dungeon Lane	Capitol	11 June 2026	1
648	Overpass	Elsewhere Always	Communion	18 June 2026	1
649	Embrace	Avalanche	Cooking Vinyl	25 June 2026	1
650	Myles Smith	My Mess, My Heart, My Life	It's Okay to Feel/Sony	2 July 2026	1
651	The Pretty Reckless	Dear God	Fearless	9 July 2026	1
652	Sienna Spiro	Visitor	Capitol/Method	16 July 2026	1
653	Rolling Stones	Foreign Tongues	Polydor	23 July 2026	1
654	Yard Act	You're Gonna Need a Little Music	Island	30 July 2026	1
655	Snow Patrol	Eyes Open	Polydor/UMR	6 August 2026	1
656	The Durutti Column	Renascent	London	13 August 2026	1
657	Flo	Therapy at the Club	EMI	20 August 2026	1
658	Phoebe Bridgers	Lost Weekend	Dead Oceans	27 August 2026	1
659	Westside Cowboy	It Goes On	Island	3 September 2026	1
660	Courteeners	God Bless the Band	Ignition	10 September 2026	1
661	Kasabian	Act III	Columbia	17 September 2026	1
662	Bloc Party	Anatomy of a Brief Romance	Contagious	24 September 2026	1
663	Beabadoobee	Pylon	Dirty Hit/Interscope	1 October 2026	1
664	Keo	Put a Smile on for me	Island	8 October 2026	1
665	Blossoms	Songs from the Wedding Cake	Distiller	15 October 2026	1
666	Jamie T	Ghosts (100 Days of Morning)	Polydor	22 October 2026	1
667	Fontaines D.C.	Dopamine Chamber	XL	29 October 2026	1
668	Amy Winehouse	Back to Black	Island	5 November 2026	1
669	The Snuts	Joy in Short Moments	Happy Artist	12 November 2026	1
670	Royal Blood	Dead Company	Warner	19 November 2026	1

=== By record label ===
As of the week ending 19 November 2026, Twenty four record labels have topped the chart for at least four weeks.

Record label	Number-one albums	Weeks at number one
Island	24	25
Polydor	22	23
BMG	19	20
EMI	17	17
Cooking Vinyl	13	13
Columbia	12	12
Warner	11	11
Atlantic	9	9
Parlophone	7	7
Interscope	7	7
Domino	6	9
Modern Sky	5	5
Partisan	5	7
Capitol	5	6
Pias	3	5
Dead Oceans	5	5
Dirty Hit	5	5
XL	5	5
Reytons	3	4
Bella Union	4	4
Ninja Tune	4	4
Fiction	4	4
Insanity	4	4
AWAL	4	4

=== By artist ===
As of the week ending 19 November 2026, Sixteen artists topped the chart for at least three weeks.

Artist	Number-one album(s)	Weeks at number one
Kylie Minogue	6	6
Easy Life	3	3
The Reytons	3	4
Yungblud	3	4
Blossoms	4	4
Arctic Monkeys	1	4
Fontaines D.C.	4	4
James	3	3
Sam Fender	3	3
Sports Team	3	3
Tom Grennan	3	3
Geese	3	3
Inhaler	3	3
Maisie Peters	3	3
The Snuts	3	3
Royal Blood	3	3
