= List of UK top-ten albums in 2024 =

The UK Albums Chart is one of many music charts compiled by the Official Charts Company that calculates the best-selling albums of the week in the United Kingdom. Since 2004 the chart has been based on the sales of both physical albums and digital downloads. Since 2015, the album chart has been based on both sales and streaming. This list shows albums that peaked in the top ten of the UK Albums Chart during 2024, as well as albums which peaked in 2023 and 2025 but were in the top 10 in 2024. The entry date is when the album appeared in the top 10 for the first time (week ending, as published by the Official Charts Company, which is six days after the chart is announced).

One-hundred and sixty-five albums were in the top 10 this year. One album from 2021, one album from 2022 and six albums from 2023 remained in the top ten for several weeks at the beginning of the year, while +–=÷× (Tour Collection) by Ed Sheeran was released in 2024 but did not reach its peak until 2025. Christmas by Michael Bublé, originally released in 2011, and Stick Season by Noah Kahan were the albums from 2023 to reach their peak in 2024.

The first new number-one album of the year was Christmas by Michael Bublé. Overall, thirty-five different albums peaked at number-one so far in 2024, with Shed Seven (2) having the most albums hit that position.

An asterisk (*) in the "Weeks in Top 10" column shows that the album is currently in the top 10.

== Top-ten albums ==
Key

Symbol	Meaning
‡	Album peaked in 2021, 2022 or 2023 but still in chart in 2024.
♦	Album released in 2024 but peaked in 2025.
(#)	Year-end top ten album position and rank
Entered	The date that the album first appeared in the chart.
Peak	Highest position that the song reached in the UK Albums Chart.

Entered (week ending)	Weeks in top 10	Album	Artist	Peak	Peak reached (week ending)	Weeks at peak
Albums in 2021
18 February 2021	212*	The Highlights ‡	The Weeknd	2	18 February 2021	7
Albums in 2022
3 November 2022	57	Midnights ‡	Taylor Swift	1	3 November 2022	5
Albums in 2023
16 February 2023	4	My 21st Century Blues ‡	Raye	2	16 February 2023	1
1 June 2023	7	Broken by Desire to Be Heavenly Sent ‡	Lewis Capaldi	1	1 June 2023	3
21 September 2023	32	Guts ‡	Olivia Rodrigo	1	21 September 2023	1
2 November 2023	11	Hackney Diamonds ‡	The Rolling Stones	1	2 November 2023	2
9 November 2023	25	1989 (Taylor's Version) ‡	Taylor Swift	1	9 November 2023	3
23 November 2023	32	Stick Season	Noah Kahan	1	22 February 2024	1
14 December 2023	8	Christmas	Michael Bublé	1	4 January 2024	1
Albums in 2024
4 January 2024	13	Diamonds	Elton John	4	4 January 2024	1
4 January 2024	9	ABBA Gold: Greatest Hits	ABBA	4	11 January 2024	1
4 January 2024	16	Curtain Call: The Hits	Eminem	5	20 May 2024	1
11 January 2024	2	Folklore	Taylor Swift	9	11 January 2024	1
18 January 2024	1	A Matter of Time	Shed Seven	1	18 January 2024	1
25 January 2024	1	Rolling Stone	D-Block Europe	1	25 January 2024	1
25 January 2024	2	American Dream	21 Savage	2	25 January 2024	1
25 January 2024	1	Pick-Up Full of Pink Carnations	The Vaccines	3	25 January 2024	1
1 February 2024	1	Saviors	Green Day	1	1 February 2024	1
1 February 2024	25	50 Years – Don't Stop	Fleetwood Mac	7	11 April 2024	2
8 February 2024	1	Bitter Sweet Love	James Arthur	1	8 February 2024	1
8 February 2024	1	Ballad of a Bystander	The Reytons	2	8 February 2024	1
8 February 2024	1	Wall of Eyes	The Smile	3	8 February 2024	1
8 February 2024	1	Black Friday	Tom Odell	5	8 February 2024	1
8 February 2024	1	People Who Aren't There Anymore	Future Islands	7	8 February 2024	1
8 February 2024	1	Dark Rainbow	Frank Carter and the Rattlesnakes	10	8 February 2024	1
15 February 2024	2	Prelude to Ecstasy	The Last Dinner Party	1	15 February 2024	1
15 February 2024	1	10 for the People	Jamie Webster	2	15 February 2024	1
22 February 2024	3	Vultures 1	¥$	2	22 February 2024	1
22 February 2024	1	What Happened to the Beach?	Declan McKenna	3	22 February 2024	1
29 February 2024	1	Tangk	Idles	1	29 February 2024	1
29 February 2024	1	The Glorification of Sadness	Paloma Faith	2	29 February 2024	1
29 February 2024	2	Legend	Bob Marley and the Wailers	6	29 February 2024	1
29 February 2024	1	The Mess We Seem to Make	Crawlers	7	29 February 2024	1
7 March 2024	3	Swing Fever	Rod Stewart & Jools Holland	1	7 March 2024	1
7 March 2024	1	Millennials	The Snuts	2	7 March 2024	1
7 March 2024	1	Thanks for Hating	Potter Payper	5	7 March 2024	1
7 March 2024	1	Western Approaches	Red Rum Club	8	7 March 2024	1
14 March 2024	2	Liam Gallagher John Squire	Liam Gallagher & John Squire	1	14 March 2024	1
14 March 2024	1	The Mandrake Project	Bruce Dickinson	3	14 March 2024	1
14 March 2024	1	Where's My Utopia?	Yard Act	4	14 March 2024	1
14 March 2024	1	Kaiser Chiefs' Easy Eighth Album	Kaiser Chiefs	6	14 March 2024	1
14 March 2024	1	Mountainhead	Everything Everything	9	14 March 2024	1
14 March 2024	1	Reflection	Skrapz	10	14 March 2024	1
21 March 2024	8	Eternal Sunshine	Ariana Grande	1	21 March 2024	2
21 March 2024	1	Invincible Shield	Judas Priest	2	21 March 2024	1
21 March 2024	1	Bleachers	Bleachers	5	21 March 2024	1
28 March 2024	1	Deeper Well	Kacey Musgraves	3	28 March 2024	1
28 March 2024	1	Everything I Thought It Was	Justin Timberlake	5	28 March 2024	1
28 March 2024	1	Still Learning	Caity Baser	7	28 March 2024	1
4 April 2024	1	Audio Vertigo	Elbow	1	4 April 2024	1
4 April 2024	2	We Don't Trust You	Future & Metro Boomin	2	4 April 2024	1
4 April 2024	1	Glasgow Eyes	The Jesus and Mary Chain	7	4 April 2024	1
11 April 2024	5	Cowboy Carter	Beyoncé	1	11 April 2024	1
11 April 2024	1	Interplay	Ride	8	11 April 2024	1
18 April 2024	1	All Quiet on the Eastern Esplanade	The Libertines	1	18 April 2024	1
18 April 2024	1	I Wonder If the World Knows?	The K's	3	18 April 2024	1
18 April 2024	1	Found Heaven	Conan Gray	4	18 April 2024	1
18 April 2024	1	Might Delete Later	J. Cole	7	18 April 2024	1
18 April 2024	1	Black/Red	Feeder	8	18 April 2024	1
25 April 2024	1	Yummy	James	1	25 April 2024	1
25 April 2024	1	One Deep River	Mark Knopfler	3	25 April 2024	1
25 April 2024	2	Papercuts (Singles Collection 2000–2023)	Linkin Park	4	25 April 2024	1
25 April 2024	1	Halo Effect	Kris Barras Band	5	25 April 2024	1
25 April 2024	1	This Could Be Texas	English Teacher	8	25 April 2024	1
25 April 2024	1	Hombres	Gun	10	25 April 2024	1
2 May 2024	31	The Tortured Poets Department	Taylor Swift	1	2 May 2024	11
2 May 2024	1	Dark Matter	Pearl Jam	2	2 May 2024	1
2 May 2024	1	UB45	UB40	5	2 May 2024	1
2 May 2024	1	Rumours	Fleetwood Mac	9	2 May 2024	1
9 May 2024	1	Nonetheless	Pet Shop Boys	2	9 May 2024	1
9 May 2024	1	All Born Screaming	St. Vincent	5	9 May 2024	1
9 May 2024	1	Jess	Jess Glynne	6	9 May 2024	1
9 May 2024	1	The Big Decider	The Zutons	7	9 May 2024	1
16 May 2024	5	Radical Optimism	Dua Lipa	1	16 May 2024	1
16 May 2024	1	Undefeated	Frank Turner	3	16 May 2024	1
16 May 2024	1	Inevitable Incredible	Kelly Jones	6	16 May 2024	1
16 May 2024	2	Sour	Olivia Rodrigo	10	16 May 2024	2
23 May 2024	1	Can We Please Have Fun	Kings of Leon	2	23 May 2024	1
23 May 2024	1	One of Wun	Gunna	4	23 May 2024	1
23 May 2024	1	Hopes and Fears	Keane	7	23 May 2024	1
30 May 2024	32	Hit Me Hard and Soft	Billie Eilish	1	30 May 2024	1
30 May 2024	1	Room Under the Stairs	Zayn	3	30 May 2024	1
30 May 2024	1	Lives Outgrown	Beth Gibbons	7	30 May 2024	1
30 May 2024	1	Orgy of the Damned	Slash	8	30 May 2024	1
30 May 2024	1	Loophole	Michael Head & The Red Elastic Band	10	30 May 2024	1
6 June 2024	1	Clancy	Twenty One Pilots	2	6 June 2024	1
6 June 2024	1	66	Paul Weller	4	6 June 2024	1
6 June 2024	2	Post Human: Nex Gen	Bring Me the Horizon	2	10 October 2024	1
13 June 2024	1	Believe Me Now?	Becky Hill	3	13 June 2024	1
13 June 2024	1	Golden Hour: Part.1	Ateez	4	13 June 2024	1
13 June 2024	1	In This City They Call You Love	Richard Hawley	5	13 June 2024	1
13 June 2024	1	Gravity Stairs	Crowded House	8	13 June 2024	1
13 June 2024	1	Smile?	K-Trap	10	13 June 2024	1
20 June 2024	35	Brat	Charli XCX	1	24 October 2024	1
20 June 2024	1	Forever	Bon Jovi	3	20 June 2024	1
20 June 2024	5	Lover	Taylor Swift	7	20 June 2024	3
20 June 2024	1	What Happened to the Heart?	Aurora	8	20 June 2024	1
27 June 2024	1	Midnight Butterflies	Sea Girls	5	27 June 2024	1
27 June 2024	43	The Rise and Fall of a Midwest Princess	Chappell Roan	1	15 August 2024	2
27 June 2024	1	One Hand Clapping	Paul McCartney and Wings	10	27 June 2024	1
4 July 2024	6	The Secret of Us	Gracie Abrams	1	4 July 2024	1
11 July 2024	1	Loom	Imagine Dragons	5	11 July 2024	1
11 July 2024	1	Future Nostalgia	Dua Lipa	8	11 July 2024	1
11 July 2024	1	Dua Lipa	Dua Lipa	10	11 July 2024	1
18 July 2024	1	Happenings	Kasabian	1	18 July 2024	1
25 July 2024	7	The Death of Slim Shady (Coup de Grâce)	Eminem	1	25 July 2024	3
25 July 2024	1	Vertigo	Griff	3	25 July 2024	1
25 July 2024	1	L.A. Times	Travis	4	25 July 2024	1
25 July 2024	1	Early Twenties	Cat Burns	7	25 July 2024	1
1 August 2024	1	Heavy Jelly	Soft Play	3	1 August 2024	1
1 August 2024	1	I Love You So F***ing Much	Glass Animals	5	1 August 2024	1
8 August 2024	1	Live at Wembley Stadium	Blur	6	8 August 2024	1
8 August 2024	1	Hi, My Name Is Insecure	Sam Tompkins	8	8 August 2024	1
8 August 2024	1	Rite Here Rite Now	Ghost	10	8 August 2024	1
15 August 2024	1	Vultures 2	¥$	7	15 August 2024	1
22 August 2024	1	This Is How Tomorrow Moves	Beabadoobee	1	22 August 2024	1
22 August 2024	1	Light It Up	Will Young	5	22 August 2024	1
29 August 2024	2	F-1 Trillion	Post Malone	1	29 August 2024	1
29 August 2024	1	Satellites	The Script	2	29 August 2024	1
5 September 2024	53	Short n' Sweet	Sabrina Carpenter	1	5 September 2024	5
5 September 2024	2	Romance	Fontaines D.C.	2	5 September 2024	1
5 September 2024	6	Time Flies... 1994–2009	Oasis	3	5 September 2024	3
5 September 2024	3	(What's the Story) Morning Glory?	Oasis	4	5 September 2024	2
5 September 2024	4	Definitely Maybe	Oasis	1	12 September 2024	1
12 September 2024	1	Wild God	Nick Cave and the Bad Seeds	5	12 September 2024	1
12 September 2024	1	Midas	Wunderhorse	6	12 September 2024	1
19 September 2024	1	Luck and Strange	David Gilmour	1	19 September 2024	1
19 September 2024	1	Ten Days	Fred Again	7	19 September 2024	1
26 September 2024	1	The Forest Is the Path	Snow Patrol	1	26 September 2024	1
26 September 2024	1	The Greatest Love	London Grammar	3	26 September 2024	1
3 October 2024	1	Gary	Blossoms	1	3 October 2024	1
3 October 2024	1	I Am	Tom Walker	4	3 October 2024	1
3 October 2024	1	In Waves	Jamie xx	5	3 October 2024	1
3 October 2024	1	143	Katy Perry	6	3 October 2024	1
10 October 2024	1	Liquid Gold	Shed Seven	1	10 October 2024	1
10 October 2024	1	Quit While You're Ahead	Nines	4	10 October 2024	1
10 October 2024	72	+–=÷× (Tour Collection) ♦	Ed Sheeran	1	9 January 2025	2
10 October 2024	1	Dance, No One's Watching	Ezra Collective	7	10 October 2024	1
17 October 2024	2	Moon Music	Coldplay	1	17 October 2024	1
17 October 2024	1	The Last Flight	Public Service Broadcasting	3	17 October 2024	1
17 October 2024	1	Changes All the Time	James Bay	4	17 October 2024	1
17 October 2024	1	Cutouts	The Smile	7	17 October 2024	1
17 October 2024	1	Key	Alison Moyet	8	17 October 2024	1
24 October 2024	1	The Mighty Several	Paul Heaton	2	24 October 2024	1
24 October 2024	1	Back to Bedlam	James Blunt	7	24 October 2024	1
31 October 2024	1	Tension II	Kylie Minogue	1	31 October 2024	1
31 October 2024	1	What Do You Believe In?	Rag'n'Bone Man	3	31 October 2024	1
31 October 2024	1	3AM (La La La)	Confidence Man	9	31 October 2024	1
7 November 2024	3	Chromakopia	Tyler, the Creator	1	7 November 2024	1
7 November 2024	1	Pink Cactus Café	Courteeners	2	7 November 2024	1
7 November 2024	1	"&"	Bastille	4	7 November 2024	1
7 November 2024	1	Songs for a Nervous Planet	Tears for Fears	6	7 November 2024	1
7 November 2024	1	Cartoon Darkness	Amyl and the Sniffers	9	7 November 2024	1
7 November 2024	1	Queen I	Queen	10	7 November 2024	1
14 November 2024	2	Songs of a Lost World	The Cure	1	14 November 2024	1
21 November 2024	1	Together At Home	Michael Ball & Alfie Boe	1	21 November 2024	1
21 November 2024	1	Earth to Grace	Massive Wagons	4	21 November 2024	1
28 November 2024	3	From Zero	Linkin Park	1	28 November 2024	1
28 November 2024	1	Access All Areas	Flo	3	28 November 2024	1
28 November 2024	1	Golden Hour: Part.2	Ateez	4	28 November 2024	1
5 December 2024	7	GNX	Kendrick Lamar	1	5 December 2024	1
5 December 2024	1	Small Changes	Michael Kiwanuka	2	5 December 2024	1
12 December 2024	1	The Party Never Ends	Juice Wrld	5	12 December 2024	1
19 December 2024	1	Rosie	Rosé	4	19 December 2024	1
19 December 2024	1	Fruitcake (EP)	Sabrina Carpenter	5	19 December 2024	1
26 December 2024	1	Clifton Park	The Reytons	5	26 December 2024	1

== Entries by artist ==
The following table shows artists who have achieved two or more top 10 entries in 2024, including albums that reached their peak in 2023. The figures only include main artists, with featured artists and appearances on compilation albums not counted individually for each artist. The total number of weeks an artist spent in the top ten in 2024 is also shown.

Entries	Artist	Weeks	Albums
5	Taylor Swift	41	Midnights, 1989 (Taylor's Version), Folklore, The Tortured Poets Department, Lover
4	Liam Gallagher	8	Liam Gallagher John Squire, Time Flies... 1994–2009, (What's the Story) Morning Glory?, Definitely Maybe
3	Dua Lipa	5	Radical Optimism, Future Nostalgia, Dua Lipa
3	Oasis	6	Time Flies... 1994–2009, (What's the Story) Morning Glory?, Definitely Maybe
2	Fleetwood Mac	25	50 Years – Don't Stop, Rumours
2	Eminem	22	Curtain Call: The Hits, The Death of Slim Shady (Coup de Grâce)
2	Olivia Rodrigo	16	Guts, Sour
2	Sabrina Carpenter	16	Short n' Sweet, Fruitcake (EP)
2	Linkin Park	5	Papercuts (Singles Collection 2000–2023), From Zero
2	¥$	4	Vultures 1, Vultures 2
2	Shed Seven	2	A Matter of Time, Liquid Gold
2	The Smile	2	Wall of Eyes, Cutouts
2	Ateez	2	Golden Hour: Part.1, Golden Hour: Part.2
2	The Reytons	2	Ballad of a Bystander, Clifton Park

== See also ==
- List of UK Albums Chart number ones of the 2020s

== Sources ==
- "Six decades of singles charts". The Official Charts Company. Archived from the original on 3 March 2011.
