= List of UK top-ten albums in 2023 =

The UK Albums Chart is one of many music charts compiled by the Official Charts Company that calculates the best-selling albums of the week in the United Kingdom. Since 2004 the chart has been based on the sales of both physical albums and digital downloads. Since 2015, the album chart has been based on both sales and streaming. This list shows albums that peaked in the top ten of the UK Albums Chart during 2023, as well as albums which peaked in 2022 and 2024 but were in the top 10 in 2023. The entry date is when the album appeared in the top 10 for the first time (week ending, as published by the Official Charts Company, which is six days after the chart is announced).

One-hundred and ninety-two albums were in the top 10 this year. Two albums from 2021 and six albums from 2022 remained in the top ten for several weeks at the beginning of the year, while Stick Season by Noah Kahan was released in 2023 but did not reach its peak until 2024. Christmas by Michael Bublé, originally released in 2011, was the only album from 2022 to reach its peak in 2023.

The first new number-one album of the year was Christmas by Michael Bublé. Overall, forty-three different albums peaked at number-one in 2023, with Damon Albarn, Ed Sheeran and Taylor Swift (2) having the joint most albums hit that position.

An asterisk (*) in the "Weeks in Top 10" column shows that the album is currently in the top 10.

== Background ==
=== Best-selling albums ===
The Weeknd had the best-selling album of the year with The Highlights. Midnights by Taylor Swift came in second place. Taylor Swift's 1989 (Taylor's Version), Diamonds by Elton John and Harry Styles' Harry's House made up the top five. Albums by Fleetwood Mac, Eminem, SZA, Arctic Monkeys and ABBA were also in the top ten best-selling albums of the year.

== Top-ten albums ==
Key

Symbol	Meaning
‡	Album peaked in 2021 or 2022 but still in chart in 2023.
♦	Album released in 2023 but peaked in 2024.
(#)	Year-end top ten album position and rank
Entered	The date that the album first appeared in the chart.
Peak	Highest position that the song reached in the UK Albums Chart.

Entered (week ending)	Weeks in top 10	Album	Artist	Peak	Peak reached (week ending)	Weeks at peak
Albums in 2021
18 February 2021	212*	The Highlights (#1) ‡	The Weeknd	2	18 February 2021	7
11 November 2021	66	= ‡	Ed Sheeran	1	11 November 2021	4
Albums in 2022
2 June 2022	57	Harry's House (#5) ‡	Harry Styles	1	2 June 2022	6
11 August 2022	11	Renaissance ‡	Beyoncé	1	11 August 2022	2
3 November 2022	57	Midnights (#2) ‡	Taylor Swift	1	3 November 2022	5
15 December 2022	8	Christmas	Michael Bublé	1	5 January 2023	2
22 December 2022	4	There's Nothing but Space, Man! ‡	Sam Ryder	1	22 December 2022	1
22 December 2022	17	SOS (#8) ‡	SZA	2	22 December 2022	3
Albums in 2023
5 January 2023	34	Diamonds (#4)	Elton John	2	6 July 2023	2
5 January 2023	1	Rumours	Fleetwood Mac	8	5 January 2023	1
5 January 2023	6	AM (#9)	Arctic Monkeys	7	6 July 2023	1
12 January 2023	17	Curtain Call: The Hits (#7)	Eminem	5	9 February 2023	1
12 January 2023	4	ABBA Gold: Greatest Hits (#10)	ABBA	10	12 January 2023	4
19 January 2023	20	50 Years – Don't Stop (#6)	Fleetwood Mac	6	18 May 2023	2
19 January 2023	8	Divinely Uninspired to a Hellish Extent	Lewis Capaldi	4	20 April 2023	2
26 January 2023	1	St. Jude	Courteeners	1	26 January 2023	1
26 January 2023	1	Rap Game Awful	Clavish	4	26 January 2023	1
26 January 2023	1	Turn the Car Around	Gaz Coombes	6	26 January 2023	1
2 February 2023	1	What's Rock and Roll?	The Reytons	1	2 February 2023	1
2 February 2023	1	Rush!	Måneskin	5	2 February 2023	1
2 February 2023	1	Wrong Side of Paradise	Black Star Riders	6	2 February 2023	1
9 February 2023	1	Gloria	Sam Smith	1	9 February 2023	1
9 February 2023	1	The Bootleg Series Vol. 17: Fragments – Time Out of Mind Sessions (1996–1997)	Bob Dylan	9	9 February 2023	1
16 February 2023	1	Queen of Me	Shania Twain	1	16 February 2023	1
16 February 2023	4	My 21st Century Blues	Raye	2	16 February 2023	1
16 February 2023	1	Heavy Heavy	Young Fathers	7	16 February 2023	1
23 February 2023	1	This Is Why	Paramore	1	23 February 2023	1
23 February 2023	1	Truth Decay	You Me at Six	4	23 February 2023	1
2 March 2023	5	Trustfall	Pink	1	2 March 2023	1
2 March 2023	1	Cuts & Bruises	Inhaler	2	2 March 2023	1
2 March 2023	1	Inhale/Exhale	Those Damn Crows	3	2 March 2023	1
2 March 2023	1	Optical Delusion	Orbital	6	2 March 2023	1
9 March 2023	1	Cracker Island	Gorillaz	1	9 March 2023	1
9 March 2023	1	Good Riddance	Gracie Abrams	3	9 March 2023	1
9 March 2023	1	High Drama	Adam Lambert	5	9 March 2023	1
16 March 2023	1	From Nothing to a Little Bit More	The Lathums	1	16 March 2023	1
16 March 2023	1	Ugly	Slowthai	2	16 March 2023	1
16 March 2023	1	Amelia	Mimi Webb	4	16 March 2023	1
16 March 2023	1	I Can Only Be Me	Eva Cassidy with the London Symphony Orchestra	9	16 March 2023	1
23 March 2023	2	Endless Summer Vacation	Miley Cyrus	1	23 March 2023	1
23 March 2023	1	UK Grim	Sleaford Mods	3	23 March 2023	1
30 March 2023	1	Songs of Surrender	U2	1	30 March 2023	1
30 March 2023	1	A Fistful of Peaches	Black Honey	6	30 March 2023	1
6 April 2023	2	Did You Know That There's a Tunnel Under Ocean Blvd	Lana Del Rey	1	6 April 2023	1
6 April 2023	1	Memento Mori	Depeche Mode	2	6 April 2023	1
6 April 2023	1	So Much (for) Stardust	Fall Out Boy	3	6 April 2023	1
6 April 2023	1	The Dark Side of the Moon Live at Wembley 1974	Pink Floyd	4	6 April 2023	1
6 April 2023	1	Gettin' Old	Luke Combs	5	6 April 2023	1
13 April 2023	1	The Record	Boygenius	1	13 April 2023	1
13 April 2023	1	Portals	Melanie Martinez	2	13 April 2023	1
13 April 2023	1	How Many Dreams?	DMA's	3	13 April 2023	1
13 April 2023	1	3 Feet High and Rising	De La Soul	9	13 April 2023	1
13 April 2023	1	Timeless	Davido	10	13 April 2023	1
20 April 2023	1	Higher Than Heaven	Ellie Goulding	1	20 April 2023	1
20 April 2023	1	Hope	NF	2	20 April 2023	1
20 April 2023	1	Meteora	Linkin Park	7	20 April 2023	1
27 April 2023	2	72 Seasons	Metallica	1	27 April 2023	1
27 April 2023	1	Intellectual Property	Waterparks	10	27 April 2023	1
4 May 2023	1	A Kiss for the Whole World	Enter Shikari	1	4 May 2023	1
4 May 2023	1	Live with the BBC Philharmonic Orchestra	The 1975	2	4 May 2023	1
4 May 2023	1	Fuse	Everything but the Girl	3	4 May 2023	1
4 May 2023	1	Folklore: The Long Pond Studio Sessions	Taylor Swift	4	4 May 2023	1
11 May 2023	1	Anxiety Replacement Therapy	The Lottery Winners	1	11 May 2023	1
11 May 2023	3	Crop Circle 2	Nines	2	11 May 2023	2
11 May 2023	1	That! Feels Good!	Jessie Ware	3	11 May 2023	1
11 May 2023	1	First Two Pages of Frankenstein	The National	4	11 May 2023	1
11 May 2023	1	Heatwave in the Cold North	Reverend and the Makers	6	11 May 2023	1
11 May 2023	1	Blood Orange	Freya Ridings	7	11 May 2023	1
11 May 2023	1	Darkadelic	The Damned	9	11 May 2023	1
18 May 2023	5	-	Ed Sheeran	1	18 May 2023	2
18 May 2023	1	First Lap	Tunde	4	18 May 2023	1
25 May 2023	1	Real Back in Style	Potter Payper	2	25 May 2023	1
25 May 2023	1	The Album	Jonas Brothers	3	25 May 2023	1
25 May 2023	1	Wake Up & It's Over	Lovejoy	5	25 May 2023	1
25 May 2023	1	The Love Invention	Alison Goldfrapp	6	25 May 2023	1
1 June 2023	7	Broken by Desire to Be Heavenly Sent	Lewis Capaldi	1	1 June 2023	3
1 June 2023	1	Take Me Back to Eden	Sleep Token	3	1 June 2023	1
1 June 2023	1	Drastic Symphonies	Def Leppard with the Royal Philharmonic Orchestra	4	1 June 2023	1
1 June 2023	1	Phantomime (EP)	Ghost	8	1 June 2023	1
8 June 2023	1	The Girl Is Crying in Her Latte	Sparks	7	8 June 2023	1
8 June 2023	1	Time	Simply Red	8	8 June 2023	1
8 June 2023	1	My Soft Machine	Arlo Parks	9	8 June 2023	1
15 June 2023	2	But Here We Are	Foo Fighters	1	15 June 2023	1
15 June 2023	2	Council Skies	Noel Gallagher's High Flying Birds	2	15 June 2023	1
15 June 2023	1	Hana	Sophie Ellis-Bextor	8	15 June 2023	1
22 June 2023	1	The Show	Niall Horan	1	22 June 2023	1
22 June 2023	1	Power to Play	McFly	2	22 June 2023	1
22 June 2023	1	Be Opened by the Wonderful	James	3	22 June 2023	1
22 June 2023	1	Paranoia, Angels, True Love	Christine and the Queens	7	22 June 2023	1
29 June 2023	2	What Ifs & Maybes	Tom Grennan	1	29 June 2023	1
29 June 2023	1	In Times New Roman...	Queens of the Stone Age	2	29 June 2023	1
29 June 2023	1	Smash: The Singles 1985–2020	Pet Shop Boys	4	29 June 2023	1
29 June 2023	1	Far from Saints	Far from Saints	5	29 June 2023	1
29 June 2023	1	The Very Best Of 1989 – 2023	Texas	6	29 June 2023	1
29 June 2023	1	A Gift & a Curse	Gunna	9	29 June 2023	1
29 June 2023	1	The World EP.2: Outlaw (EP)	Ateez	10	29 June 2023	1
6 July 2023	1	The Good Witch	Maisie Peters	1	6 July 2023	1
6 July 2023	7	Lover	Taylor Swift	8	31 August 2023	1
13 July 2023	1	Dead Club City	Nothing but Thieves	1	13 July 2023	1
13 July 2023	1	Messy	Olivia Dean	4	13 July 2023	1
13 July 2023	1	Pink Tape	Lil Uzi Vert	7	13 July 2023	1
13 July 2023	1	Chaos for the Fly	Grian Chatten	10	13 July 2023	1
20 July 2023	7	Speak Now (Taylor's Version)	Taylor Swift	1	20 July 2023	1
20 July 2023	1	The Singles: Echoes from the Edge of Heaven	Wham!	2	20 July 2023	1
20 July 2023	1	Angels & Queens – Part II	Gabriels	3	20 July 2023	1
20 July 2023	1	I Inside the Old Year Dying	PJ Harvey	5	20 July 2023	1
20 July 2023	1	DBE World	D-Block Europe	6	20 July 2023	1
20 July 2023	9	1989	Taylor Swift	5	24 August 2023	2
27 July 2023	2	Beautiful and Brutal Yard	J Hus	1	27 July 2023	1
27 July 2023	1	You & I	Rita Ora	6	27 July 2023	1
3 August 2023	2	The Ballad of Darren	Blur	1	3 August 2023	1
3 August 2023	1	Starcatcher	Greta Van Fleet	8	3 August 2023	1
10 August 2023	7	Utopia	Travis Scott	1	10 August 2023	1
10 August 2023	1	Unhealthy	Anne-Marie	2	10 August 2023	1
10 August 2023	1	Austin	Post Malone	3	10 August 2023	1
10 August 2023	1	The Feminine Divine	Dexys	6	10 August 2023	1
17 August 2023	1	Victory	Cian Ducrot	1	17 August 2023	1
17 August 2023	1	Smile	Skindred	2	17 August 2023	1
17 August 2023	1	People Like Me & You	The Sherlocks	4	17 August 2023	1
17 August 2023	1	One Man Band	Miles Kane	5	17 August 2023	1
17 August 2023	1	Timeless	N-Dubz	6	17 August 2023	1
24 August 2023	1	Knebworth 22	Liam Gallagher	1	24 August 2023	1
24 August 2023	1	The Death of Randy Fitzsimmons	The Hives	2	24 August 2023	1
24 August 2023	1	Volcano	Jungle	3	24 August 2023	1
24 August 2023	1	Unfinished Business	Fredo	9	24 August 2023	1
24 August 2023	1	Ziggy Stardust: The Motion Picture	David Bowie	10	24 August 2023	1
31 August 2023	1	Unreal Unearth	Hozier	1	31 August 2023	1
31 August 2023	1	Exorcism of Youth	The View	6	31 August 2023	1
31 August 2023	1	Snow Angel	Reneé Rapp	7	31 August 2023	1
7 September 2023	2	I Told Them...	Burna Boy	1	7 September 2023	1
7 September 2023	1	Euphoria	Claire Richards	2	7 September 2023	1
7 September 2023	1	Back to Square One	Digga D	6	7 September 2023	1
7 September 2023	1	Weedkiller	Ashnikko	7	7 September 2023	1
7 September 2023	1	Road	Alice Cooper	8	7 September 2023	1
14 September 2023	1	Back to the Water Below	Royal Blood	1	14 September 2023	1
14 September 2023	1	The 1975	The 1975	3	14 September 2023	1
14 September 2023	1	Everything Is Alive	Slowdive	6	14 September 2023	1
21 September 2023	32	Guts	Olivia Rodrigo	1	21 September 2023	1
21 September 2023	1	Sea of Mirrors	The Coral	3	21 September 2023	1
21 September 2023	1	Hit Parade	Róisín Murphy	5	21 September 2023	1
21 September 2023	1	For That Beautiful Feeling	The Chemical Brothers	6	21 September 2023	1
21 September 2023	3	Sour	Olivia Rodrigo	5	28 September 2023	1
21 September 2023	1	My Neighbours Don't Know	M Huncho	9	21 September 2023	1
28 September 2023	1	Greatest Hits 2.0	Busted	1	28 September 2023	1
28 September 2023	1	The Land Is Inhospitable and So Are We	Mitski	4	28 September 2023	1
5 October 2023	2	Tension	Kylie Minogue	1	5 October 2023	1
5 October 2023	1	Strength to Strength	Headie One & K-Trap	4	5 October 2023	1
5 October 2023	1	Scarlet	Doja Cat	5	5 October 2023	1
12 October 2023	2	Autumn Variations	Ed Sheeran	1	12 October 2023	1
12 October 2023	1	Falling or Flying	Jorja Smith	3	12 October 2023	1
12 October 2023	1	The Harmony Codex	Steven Wilson	4	12 October 2023	1
12 October 2023	1	Screamin' at the Sky	Black Stone Cherry	6	12 October 2023	1
12 October 2023	1	Ultraviolence	Lana Del Rey	7	12 October 2023	1
19 October 2023	4	For All the Dogs	Drake	1	19 October 2023	1
19 October 2023	1	Crop Circle 3	Nines	2	19 October 2023	1
19 October 2023	1	The Dark Side of the Moon Redux	Roger Waters	4	19 October 2023	1
19 October 2023	1	Another Friday Night	Joel Corry	5	19 October 2023	1
19 October 2023	1	Javelin	Surfjan Stevens	7	19 October 2023	1
26 October 2023	1	Sick Boi	Ren	1	26 October 2023	1
26 October 2023	1	Are We There Yet?	Rick Astley	2	26 October 2023	1
26 October 2023	1	Something to Give Each Other	Troye Sivan	4	26 October 2023	1
26 October 2023	1	Paint My Bedroom Black	Holly Humberstone	5	26 October 2023	1
26 October 2023	1	The Darker the Shadow the Brighter the Light	The Streets	7	26 October 2023	1
26 October 2023	1	The Dark Side of the Moon	Pink Floyd	8	26 October 2023	1
26 October 2023	1	Aces are High	When Rivers Meet	9	26 October 2023	1
2 November 2023	11	Hackney Diamonds	The Rolling Stones	1	2 November 2023	2
2 November 2023	1	One More Time...	Blink-182	2	2 November 2023	1
2 November 2023	1	My Big Day	Bombay Bicycle Club	3	2 November 2023	1
2 November 2023	4	Folklore	Taylor Swift	6	7 December 2023	1
9 November 2023	25	1989 (Taylor's Version) (#3)	Taylor Swift	1	9 November 2023	3
9 November 2023	1	Bauhaus Staircase	Orchestral Manoeuvres in the Dark	2	9 November 2023	1
9 November 2023	1	Danse Macabre	Duran Duran	4	9 November 2023	1
9 November 2023	1	Who We Used to Be	James Blunt	5	9 November 2023	1
9 November 2023	1	Famous Last Words	Casisdead	7	9 November 2023	1
9 November 2023	1	Open Arms – The Symphonic Songbook	Alfie Boe	10	9 November 2023	1
16 November 2023	1	The Masterplan	Oasis	2	16 November 2023	1
16 November 2023	1	Golden	Jungkook	3	16 November 2023	1
16 November 2023	1	Cliff With Strings – My Kinda Life	Cliff Richard	5	16 November 2023	1
16 November 2023	1	Spirit Power: The Best Of Johnny Marr	Johnny Marr	7	16 November 2023	1
23 November 2023	2	1967–1970	The Beatles	2	23 November 2023	1
23 November 2023	1	1962–1966	The Beatles	3	23 November 2023	1
23 November 2023	1	2 RUFF, Vol. 1	Chase & Status	4	23 November 2023	1
23 November 2023	1	Quarter Life Crisis	Baby Queen	5	23 November 2023	1
23 November 2023	32	Stick Season ♦	Noah Kahan	1	22 February 2024	1
23 November 2023	1	All the Little Lights	Passenger	7	23 November 2023	1
23 November 2023	1	Substance	New Order	10	23 November 2023	1
30 November 2023	1	Theatre of the Absurd Presents C'est la Vie	Madness	1	30 November 2023	1
30 November 2023	1	Rockstar	Dolly Parton	5	30 November 2023	1
7 December 2023	3	This Life	Take That	1	7 December 2023	1
14 December 2023	1	I/O	Peter Gabriel	1	14 December 2023	1
14 December 2023	1	The World EP.Fin: Will	Ateez	2	14 December 2023	1
14 December 2023	2	Christmas	Cher	5	28 December 2023	1
21 December 2023	1	Rebel Diamonds	The Killers	1	21 December 2023	1
21 December 2023	2	Pink Friday 2	Nicki Minaj	3	21 December 2023	1
21 December 2023	1	Think Later	Tate McRae	5	21 December 2023	1
28 December 2023	1	Jewels of Romance	André Rieu & the Johann Strauss Orchestra	8	28 December 2023	1

== Entries by artist ==
The following table shows artists who have achieved two or more top 10 entries in 2023, including albums that reached their peak in 2022. The figures only include main artists, with featured artists and appearances on compilation albums not counted individually for each artist. The total number of weeks an artist spent in the top ten in 2023 is also shown.

Entries	Artist	Weeks	Albums
7	Taylor Swift	46	Midnights, Folklore: The Long Pond Studio Sessions, Lover, Speak Now (Taylor's Version), 1989, Folklore, 1989 (Taylor's Version)
3	Ed Sheeran	15	=, -, Autumn Variations
3	Roger Waters	3	The Dark Side of the Moon Live at Wembley 1974, The Dark Side of the Moon Redux, The Dark Side of the Moon
2	The 1975	2	Live with the BBC Philharmonic Orchestra, The 1975
2	Damon Albarn	4	Cracker Island, The Ballad of Darren
2	Lana Del Rey	3	Did You Know That There's a Tunnel Under Ocean Blvd, Ultraviolence
2	Lewis Capaldi	13	Divinely Uninspired to a Hellish Extent, Broken by Desire to Be Heavenly Sent
2	Liam Gallagher	2	Knebworth 22, The Masterplan
2	Noel Gallagher	3	Council Skies, The Masterplan
2	Fleetwood Mac	21	Rumours, 50 Years – Don't Stop
2	Olivia Rodrigo	15	Guts, Sour
2	Nines	4	Crop Circle 2, Crop Circle 3
2	Pink Floyd	3	The Dark Side of the Moon Live at Wembley 1974, The Dark Side of the Moon Redux
2	The Beatles	2	1967–1970, 1962–1966

== See also ==
- List of UK Albums Chart number ones of the 2020s

== Sources ==
- "Six decades of singles charts". The Official Charts Company. Archived from the original on 3 March 2011.
