= I Wonder If the World Knows? =

Studio album by The K's
- Released: 5 April 2024
- Genre: Alternative rock; indie rock
- Length: 45:23
- Label: LAB Records
- Producer: Gareth Nuttall

The K's chronology
I Wonder If the World Knows? (2024)	Pretty on the Internet (2025)

Singles from I Wonder If the World Knows?
- 1. "Valley One" Released: 15 May 2020; 2. "Hometown" Released: 22 April 2022; 3. "Hoping Maybe" Released: 20 January 2023; 4. "Chancer" Released: 17 March 2023; 5. "Landmines" Released: 23 June 2023; 6. "Heart On My Sleeve" Released: 22 November 2023; 7. "No Place Like Home" Released: 17 January 2024; 8. "Black and Blue" Released: 28 February 2024; 9. "Lights Go Down" Released: 4 April 2024

Singles from Deluxe Edition
- 1. "Sarajevo" Released: 28 July 2017; 2. "Glass Towns" Released: 10 December 2019; 3. "Got A Feeling" Released: 14 December 2019

I Wonder If the World Knows? is the debut studio album by English rock band The K's. The album was released on 5 April 2024 through Lab Records.

== Track listing ==
All tracks are written by Jamie Boyle & Ryan Breslin, except where noted.

No.	Title	Length
1.	"Icarus"	4:15
2.	"Heart On My Sleeve"	2:58
3.	"Chancer"	3:15
4.	"Throw It All Away"	3:27
5.	"Lights Go Down"	4:22
6.	"Hometown"	4:53
7.	"Landmines"	4:44
8.	"Hoping Maybe"	3:50
9.	"No Place Like Home"	2:54
10.	"Black and Blue"	3:26
11.	"Circles"	3:57
12.	"Valley One" (Not included on some editions)	3:17
Total length:		45:23

I Wonder If the World Knows? (Deluxe Edition) track listing
No.	Title	Writer(s)	Length
1.	"Icarus" (with Tony Walsh)	Boyle; Breslin; Tony Walsh	4:31
2.	"Sarajevo"		3:25
3.	"Glass Towns"		2:54
4.	"Got a Feeling"		3:08
5.	"Just For Today"		3:20
6.	"Dacton & Wanderella"		4:12
Total length:			21:30

== Charts ==
Chart performance
Chart (2025)	Peak position
Scottish Albums (Official Charts)	3
UK Albums (Official Charts)	3
UK Independent Albums (Official Charts)	1
