= The New Eves =

British folk punk band

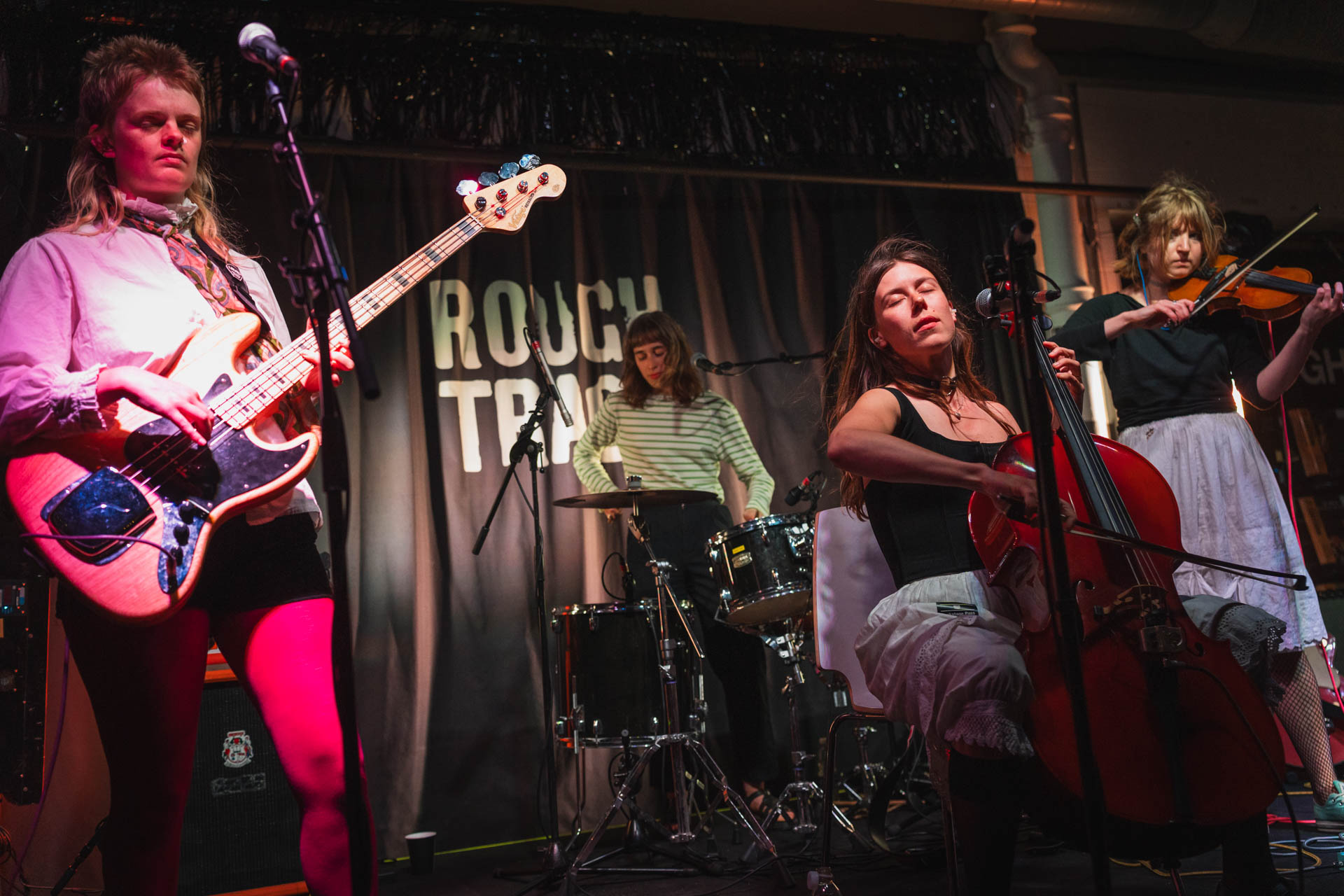
- (L–R): Kate Mager, Ella Oona Russell, Nina Winder-Lind, and Violet Farrer performing as The New Eves in 2025

Background information
- Origin: Brighton, England
- Genres: Folk, punk, rock
- Years active: 2023–present
- Label: Transgressive
- Members: Violet Farrer; Kate Mager; Ella Oona Russell; Nina Winder-Lind
- Website: www.musicglue.com/the-new-eves/

The New Eves are a British folk punk band from Brighton, England. The band are currently signed to Transgressive Records. The group consists of vocalist/guitarist/violinist Violet Farrer, vocalist/cellist/violinist/ Nina Winder-Lind, vocalist and bassist Kate Mager and drummer/flutist/vocalist Ella Oona Russell.

== History ==
The band formed in 2021, in Brighton, England.

In 2023, the group released their debut single titled "Original Sin". The group released their second single "Mother" the same year. In 2025, the group announced and released their debut album titled The New Eve Is Rising. Upon the album's announcement, the group released the songs "Rivers Run Red" and "The New Eve". The album received positive reviews. and was named an "Album of the Week" by The Observer.

== Band members ==
- Violet Farrer – guitar, violin, vocals (2023–present)
- Kate Mager – bass, vocals (2023–present)
- Ella Oona Russell – drums, flute, vocals (2023–present)
- Nina Winder-Lind – guitar, cello, vocals (2023–present)

== Discography ==
=== Albums ===
- The New Eve Is Rising (2025, Transgressive Records)

=== Singles ===
- "Original Sin"/"Mother" (2023)
- "The New Eve"/"Rivers Run Red" (2025)
- "Cow Song" (2025)
- "Red Brick"/"Whale Station" (2025)
