= The Mess We Seem to Make =

Studio album by Crawlers
- Released: 16 February 2024
- Genre: Alternative rock
- Length: 50:20
- Label: Polydor
- Producer: Pete Robertson

Crawlers chronology
Loud Without Noise (2022)	The Mess We Seem to Make (2024)

Singles from The Mess We Seem to Make
- 1. "Would You Come to My Funeral" Released: 18 September 2023; 2. "Call It Love" Released: 17 November 2023; 3. "Kills Me to Be Kind" Released: 19 January 2024; 4. "Golden Bridge" Released: 9 February 2024

The Mess We Seem to Make is the debut studio album by English alternative rock band Crawlers, released on 16 February 2024 through Polydor Records. It was produced by Pete Robertson and received acclaim from critics.

== Critical reception ==
Professional ratings
Aggregate scores
Source	Rating
Metacritic	89/100
Review scores
Source	Rating
DIY	5/5 stars
Kerrang!	4/5
MusicOMH	4/5 stars
NME	4/5 stars

The Mess We Seem to Make received a score of 89 out of 100 on review aggregator Metacritic based on four critics' reviews, indicating "universal acclaim". NME's Rishi Shah found there to be "more poignant and beautiful moments on The Mess We Seem to Make", writing that the band "reaffirm their place as one of the young guiding lights in British guitar music". Sam Law of Kerrang! called it "heart-tugging" and felt that "the striking vibrancy and surging energy with which they translate it to these 12 tracks is utterly remarkable".

In a five-star review, Emma Swann of DIY described The Mess We Seem to Make as a "sonically rich, musically accomplished record" on which lead singer Holly Minto has an "enviably dextrous voice that can't help but take centre stage". John Murphy of MusicOMH commented that it is "clear that this is an album designed to sound enormous" as Minto "sing[s] with a refreshing honesty about the obsessional nature of sex and love".

== Track listing ==
The Mess We Seem to Make track listing
No.	Title	Length
1.	"Meaningless Sex"	3:43
2.	"Kiss Me"	3:24
3.	"Hit It Again"	3:56
4.	"Better If I Just Pretend"	2:57
5.	"Would You Come to My Funeral"	4:51
6.	"Golden Bridge"	4:36
7.	"Come Over (Again)"	4:13
8.	"Kills Me to Be Kind"	4:40
9.	"What I Know Is What I Love"	4:04
10.	"I End Up Alone"	3:47
11.	"Call It Love"	4:00
12.	"Nighttime Affair"	3:59
Total length:		50:20

Deluxe edition
No.	Title	Length
13.	"That Time of Year Always"	3:34
14.	"Messiah"	3:43
15.	"Lucy"	3:31
16.	"Moving Parts"	3:59
17.	"Kiss Me" (acoustic version)	3:32
18.	"Call It Love" (alternative version)	3:52
19.	"Meaningless Sex" (intimate version)	3:55
20.	"I End Up Alone" (alternative version)	3:47
Total length:		78:13

== Personnel ==
Crawlers

- Holly Minto – lead vocals, trumpet
- Amy Woodall – guitar, synthesizer, programming, backing vocals
- Liv May – bass guitar, backing vocals
- Harry Breen – drums, backing vocals

Additional musicians

- Pete Robertson – organ (tracks 1, 5 and 8), percussion (tracks 1, 3, 7 and 12), drums (track 2), synthesizer (tracks 2, 4, 6, 9 and 12), programming (tracks 3, 4 and 10), harmonium (tracks 6 and 7), string arrangement (track 6), acoustic guitar (track 8), piano (tracks 8 and 12), tambourine (track 8), electric guitar (track 10)
- Tom Roach – programming (track 6)
- Martin Smith – trumpet (track 7)
- Beni Giles – string arrangement (tracks 7 and 12)

== Charts ==
Chart performance for The Mess We Seem to Make
Chart (2024)	Peak position
Belgian Albums (Ultratop Flanders)	199
Scottish Albums (OCC)	4
UK Albums (OCC)	7
UK Independent Albums (OCC)	14
