= The New Eve Is Rising =

Studio album by The New Eves
- Released: 1 August 2025
- Studios: Rockfield Coach House (Monmouth); The Hangman's Quarters (Bristol)
- Length: 39:45
- Label: Transgressive
- Producers: Joe Jones; Jack Ogborne

The New Eve Is Rising is the debut studio album by British folk punk band the New Eves. It was released on 1 August 2025 via Transgressive. Incorporating elements of drone rock, traditional folk and anarcho-punk, the album was produced by Jack Ogborne and Joe Jones with the band.

== Reception ==
Professional ratings
Review scores
Source	Rating
Clash	8/10
DIY	4/5 stars
God Is in the TV	8/10
The Guardian	4/5 stars
MusicOMH	4/5 stars
NME	4/5 stars
New Noise	4/5 stars
Uncut	3.5/5 stars

In a four-star review for New Noise, Oscar Ortega remarked, "At times an avant-folk rumination and free form post-punk nonsense, the New Eve Is Rising is a seemingly random amalgamation of arrangements that just so happen to find themselves together."

Rating the album four stars, Sam Shepherd of MusicOMH stated, "The vocal delivery can be somewhat irritating at times, the music jarring, and the content, for some, might be a little bit off-putting. However, there's a magic at the heart of this album. It references moments in music history, yet convincingly twists them to its singular path."

The album received a four-star rating from NME, whose reviewer Rhian Daly noted it as "a record that instead mines the unpredictable free-spiritedness of freak folk, the loose, louche nature of rock and roll and the no-rules attitude of punk." DIY's Daisy Carter assigned the project a rating of four stars, calling it "a playful exercise in boundary-pushing and performance." Robin Murray of Clash, referring to the album as "a record of curious indulgence" and "an unforgettable debut", observed that it "stands out through its bloody-minded singularities" and "maintains an incredible sense of unity" and "an incantation of identity."

Giving it four stars in his review for the Guardian, Alexis Petridis commented, "the moments when the album doesn't quite work are tempered by the sense that this is a band still in a state of flux and progress." Describing the release as feeling "ancient and immediate, organic yet unearthly," Trev Etkin of God Is in the TV opined, it "captures that first cognitive jolt and forges it into something even more elemental." Uncut's Sharon O'Connell rated the New Eve Is Rising 3.5 stars and described it as "a confident, adventurous debut, intuitive yet purposeful and full of reinvention's promise."

== Track listing ==
All tracks are written by The New Eves.

The New Eve Is Rising track listing
No.	Title	Length
1.	"The New Eve"	3:17
2.	"Highway Man"	3:42
3.	"Cow Song"	6:21
4.	"Mid-Air Glass"	2:54
5.	"Astrolabe"	3:25
6.	"Circles"	4:31
7.	"Mary"	3:45
8.	"Rivers Run Red"	3:19
9.	"Volcano"	8:31
Total length:		39:45

== Personnel ==
Credits adapted from the album's liner notes and Tidal.

=== The New Eves ===
- Violet Farrer – violin, guitar, vocals, co-production, sleeve design, artwork
- Kate Mager – bass guitar, co-production, sleeve design, artwork
- Ella Oona Russell – flute, vocals, drums, co-production, sleeve design, artwork
- Nina Winder-Lind – cello, vocals, co-production, sleeve design, artwork

=== Additional contributors ===
- Jack Ogborne – production, recording, mixing, piano on "The New Eve" and "Rivers Run Red"
- Joe Jones – production, recording, mixing
- Cameron McPhail – mastering
- Hugo Winder-Lind – sleeve design, artwork

== Charts ==
Chart performance for The New Eve Is Rising
Chart (2025)	Peak position
Scottish Albums (Official Charts)	7
UK Albums (Official Charts)	88
UK Folk Albums (Official Charts)	1
UK Independent Albums (Official Charts)	1
