= Crawlers (band) =

English rock band

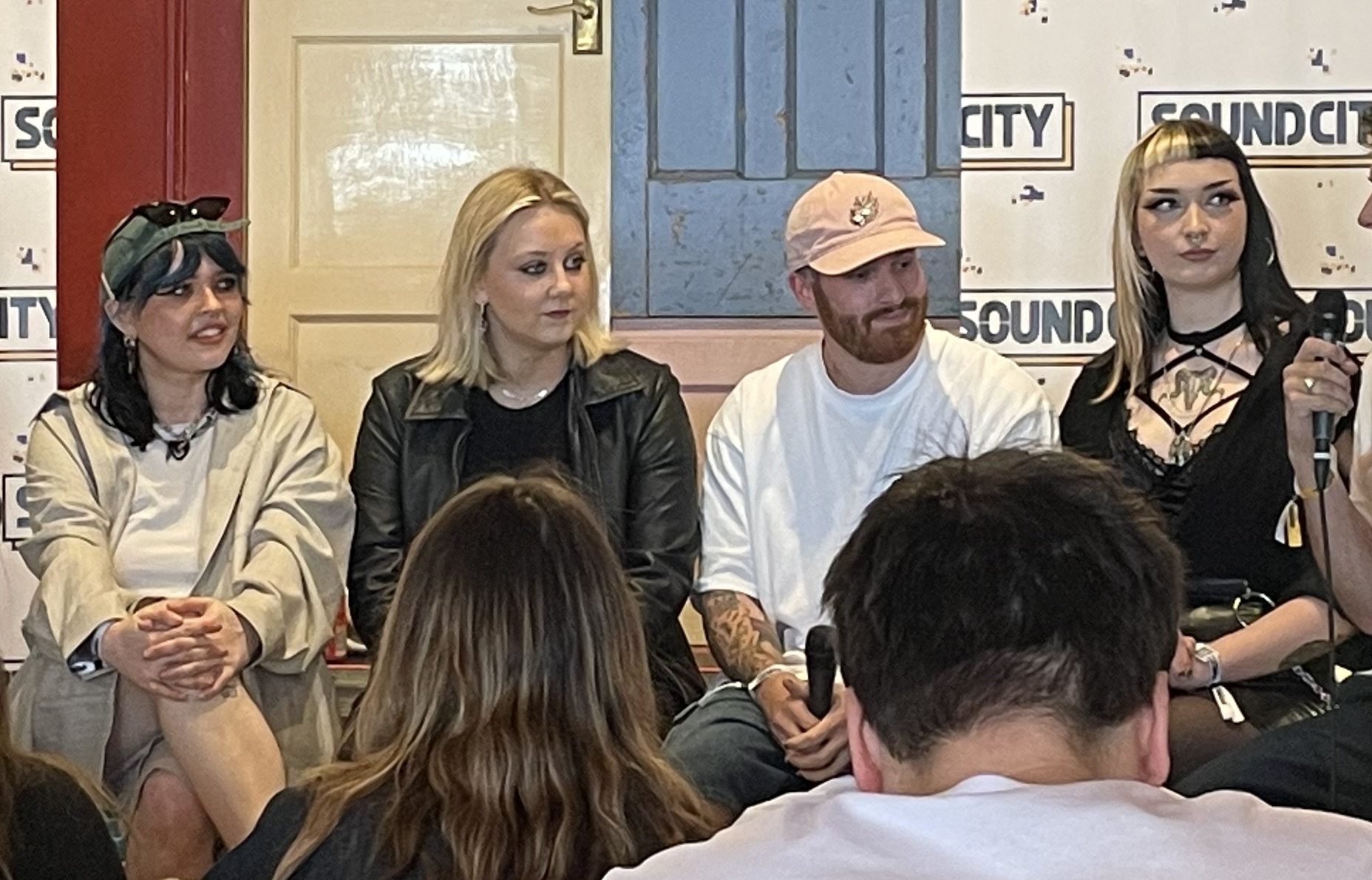
- Crawlers in 2024

Background information
- Origin: Warrington, Cheshire, England
- Genres: Alternative rock, soft grunge
- Years active: 2018–present
- Label: Polydor
- Members: Liv May; Holly Minto; Amy Woodall
- Past members: Harry Breen; Ben McKeown

Crawlers are an English rock band from Warrington, formed in 2018. The band gained widespread attention in late 2021 when their single "Come Over (Again)" went viral on the social media platform TikTok. In early 2024, the band joined Canadian rock group Mother Mother as a supporting act on tour.

In 2022 they signed to Polydor Records, and released the EP Loud Without Noise, which debuted at number 22 on the UK Albums Chart in November 2022. They released their debut album The Mess We Seem to Make in February 2024.

== History ==
Crawlers was formed in 2018 by schoolmates Amy Woodall and Liv May, and Holly Minto, who May had met at the Liverpool Institute for Performing Arts. Drummer Harry Breen later joined and they began performing at small venues in Liverpool. The band gained an internet following, especially on TikTok. Their song "Come Over (Again)" charted in the top 100 on the UK Singles Chart. This led to the band being signed to Polydor Records in January 2022. The band played two sold-out UK tours in April and November 2022, during which they played their largest show to date at the O2 Academy Liverpool. In the same year the band performed at multiple UK festivals and opened for My Chemical Romance in May 2022 in Warrington. On 17 January 2023, their song "So Tired" was featured on the DC Universe series Doom Patrol. On 18 July, 2024, the group was announced as an opener for American Rock band Jane's Addiction alongside Love & Rockets. In September 2025, the band announced the departure of drummer Harry Breen.

== Members ==
=== Current members ===
- Holly Minto – lead vocals, guitar, trumpet
- Amy Woodall – guitar, backing vocals
- Liv May – bass, backing vocals
- Gavin Sullivivan – drums, (session)
- Lucy Jones – piano (session/touring)

=== Former members ===
- Harry Breen – drums - 2021-2025
- Ben McKeown - drums - 2018-2021

== Discography ==
=== Albums ===
- The Mess We Seem to Make (2024)

=== EPs ===
- Crawlers (2021)
- Loud Without Noise (2022) – No. 22 UK Albums Chart, No. 1 UK Rock and Metal Albums
- Loud & With Noise (Live From EartH, London) (2023)
- TURN OFF THE TV (2026)

=== Singles ===
- "So Tired" (2019)
- "Placebo" (2020)
- "Hush" (2020)
- "Statues" (2021)
- "Breathe" (2021)
- "MONROE" (2021)
- "Come Over (Again) [Live Acoustic]" (2022)
- "I Can't Drive" (2022)
- "Fuck Me (I Didn't Know How To Say)" (2022)
- "I Don't Want It" (2022)
- "Hang Me Like Jesus" (2022)
- "Too Soon" (2022)
- "That Time of Year Always" (2023)
- "Messiah" (2023)
- "Messiah (Acoustic)"
- "Would You Come to My Funeral" (2023)
- "Call It Love" (2023)
- "Kills Me To Be Kind" (2024)
- "Golden Bridge" (2024)
- "AFRAID TO DIE" (2026)
- "COOL" (2026)
