= Tony Walsh (poet) =

English poet, performer and writer (born 1965)

Tony Walsh (born 1965), also known as Longfella, is an English poet, performer and writer.

== Biography ==
Walsh was born into a family of partially Irish descent in east Manchester, the oldest of four children. He was educated at the University of Salford, but dropped out in 1986. He held a variety of jobs, including working in a sausage factory and a bakery. In 1991 he was tied up at gunpoint in an armed robbery whilst working on a Post Office counter. After retraining in 1991, he worked as a housing officer for Manchester City Council, and then for three years as manager of a community regeneration project in Salford. Between 2005 and 2011 he managed a neighbourhood team in Salford City Council.

He has worked as a freelance writer and performance poet since 2004, and full-time since 2011. He adopted the professional name "Longfella" in allusion to his height (almost 6 feet 5 inches (1.96 m)). He has performed widely around the UK and Europe, at festivals and workshops, and for the British Council. He has led workshops in a wide variety of educational institutions, including schools, colleges, universities, prisons and care units. In 2011, he was Poet in Residence at the Glastonbury Festival. His writings have also featured in many magazines. His first collection of verse, Sex & Love & Rock&Roll, was published in 2015.

In May 2017, he came to wider attention for delivering his poem "This Is the Place" to the crowds gathered in Albert Square in central Manchester on 23 May for the public vigil following the bomb attack at the Manchester Arena. His performance was described as "the perfect symbol of the pride, passion and defiance of Manchester's people". The poem had been commissioned in 2013, by the charity Forever Manchester. He later read the poem at the One Love Manchester Concert, held in benefit of the attack's victims and their families. It was discussed alongside poems written about earlier atrocities committed in Manchester, including The Masque of Anarchy by Percy Bysshe Shelley, on BBC Radio 4's Front Row on 24 May 2017.

== Family ==
Walsh is married with two children, and lives in Manchester. His brother, Rev’d Mike Walsh, is a Minister of the United Reformed Church serving in South Manchester.
