= Jonny Yerrell =

English rapper (born 1985)

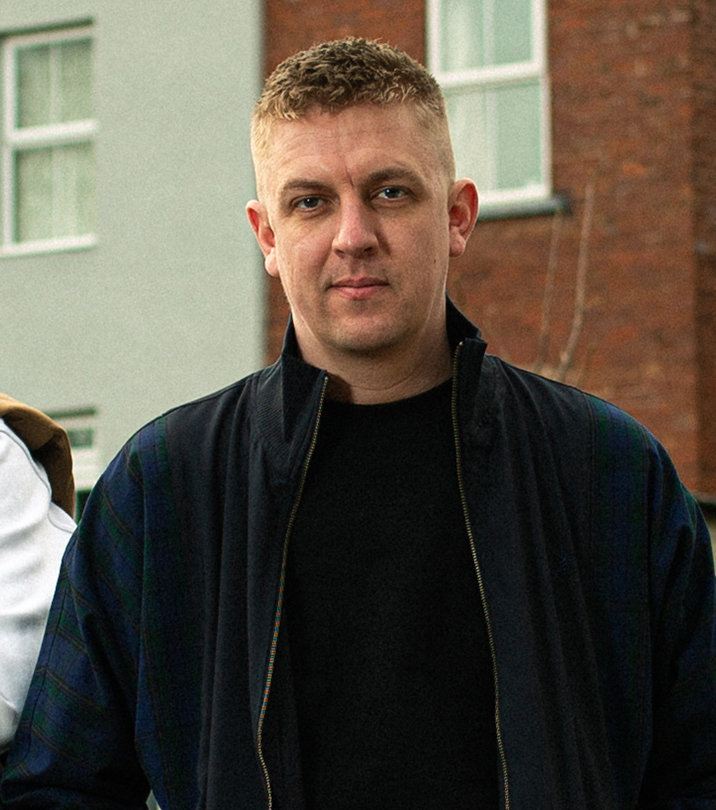
- Yerrell in 2023

Background information
- Born: Jonathan Holmes Yerrell; 18 October 1985 (age 41); Rotherham, South Yorkshire, England
- Genre: Indie
- Occupations: Singer, songwriter
- Instrument: Vocals
- Label: Universal Music (2010–2011)

Jonny Yerrell (born 18 October 1985 in Rotherham), is the frontman and songwriter with the band The Reytons.

== Early life ==
Yerrell grew up in Kiveton Park, a village outside Rotherham. His father was a tradesman. In order to break into the music scene, he played open mic nights, busked on the streets and sold his self-made albums in town centres.

== Jay Mya ==
As a solo artist operating under the name Jay Mya, Yerrell released his debut single in 2011 called "Chasing Rainbows", which peaked at number 124 in the national singles chart, in a year in which he supported Professor Green on tour. He followed this track up with the Chance To Fail EP which featured the tracks "Let Me Know", "Break Out", "Catch Me " and "Need You", with the last track being based around a sample of "Finally" by Kings of Tomorrow featuring Julie McKnight.

== The Reytons ==
After releasing a number of singles under different aliases, Yerrell formed The Reytons in 2017 with guitarist Joe O'Brien, bassist Lee Holland and drummer Jamie Todd. Their EP May Seriously Harm You and Others Around You charted at number 27, on the Official Charts Top 40 Album chart, in March 2021. This was followed by Kids Off The Estate in November 2021, their full length debut, which reached number 11 in the albums chart.

== Discography ==
=== Singles ===
List of solo singles, with selected chart positions, showing year released and album name
Title	Year	Peak chart positions
Title	Year	UK Indie
"Chasing Rainbows"	2011	15
"Safe at Last"	2014	20
