= Hot Shock =

Studio album by HotWax
- Released: March 7, 2025
- Genre: Rock and roll
- Length: 28:16
- Label: Marathon Artists
- Producer: Catherine Marks; Steph Marziano

HotWax chronology
Invite Me, Kindly (2023)	Hot Shock (2025)

Singles from Hot Shock
- 1. "She's Got a Problem" Released: 22 October 2024; 2. "Wanna Be a Doll" Released: 4 December 2024; 3. "One More Reason" Released: 15 January 2025; 4. "Strange to Be Here" Released: 7 March 2025; 5. "Tell Me Everything's Alright" Released: 17 July 2025

Hot Shock is the debut studio album by English alternative rock trio HotWax. It was released on 7 March 2025 via Marathon Artists in LP, CD and digital formats. It features the singles "She's Got a Problem", "Wanna Be a Doll", "One More Reason", "Strange to Be Here" and "Tell Me Everything's Alright".

== Background ==
Incorporating elements of alternative rock, grunge, and riot grrrl inspired by bands such as Sonic Youth, the Breeders, and Hole, the album consists of ten tracks ranging between two and four minutes each, with a total runtime of approximately twenty-eight minutes. It was produced by Catherine Marks and Steph Marziano.

"She's Got a Problem" was released as a single on 22 October 2024. It was followed by the second single "Wanna Be a Doll" on 4 December 2024. HotWax released the third single "One More Reason" on 15 January 2025, alongside a music video directed by Josh Quinton. "Strange to Be Here" was released by the group as the fourth single of the album on 7 March 2025. It was followed by the fifth and final single "Tell Me Everything's Alright" on 17 July 2025.

== Reception ==
Professional ratings
Review scores
Source	Rating
Clash	7/10
DIY	4/5 stars
Dork	4/5 stars
The Line of Best Fit	7/10
Louder Than War	4/5 stars
NME	5/5 stars
New Noise	4/5 stars
Spectrum Culture	70%
Under the Radar	8/10 stars

In a five-star review for NME, Ali Shutler noted it as "full of filthy rock'n'roll that's made for dancing," referring to each song as "a ferocious, unruly beast that's allowed to stomp around." Andy Von Pip of Under the Radar assigned the album a rating of eight and described it as "a tightly wound collection of adrenalized anthems designed for maximum impact." DIY's Sarah Jamieson opined, "Admittedly, there's not much in the way of dynamic surprises here, but for a debut album, it's a distilled demonstration of their talents thus far," giving it a rating of four stars.

The album received a rating of four from Dork, whose reviewer Ciaran Picker described it as "brimming with swagger" and "combining the frantic energy of their earlier EPs, the sweatiness of their live shows, and a more melodic maturity." Also giving it a rating of four, Louder Than War's John Robb called it a "hot collection of high decibel songs soundtracking the stuff of life, the high and lows, the angst and the escape and crafted into timeless time bomb anthems that prove that despite endless warnings, rock music is anything but dead." Justice Petersen, writing for New Noise, gave the album a rating of four stars and remarked, "Bringing a refreshing and cathartic fire to their artistry, Hot Shock not only show a heightened maturity for the band, but an incredible knack for exploration and experimentation that is a result of accepting life's imminent chaos."

Despite noting issues with several songs on the album as "muddy, grating and unappealing", Spectrum Culture reviewer Bill Cooper described Hot Shock as "still a decent listen", "chaotic", "adrenaline-filled", "honest", exhibiting "emotional heaviness" and "channeling 90s grunge." Writing for the Line of Best Fit, Joshua Mills observed that the album was "built on a bedrock of sounds popularized before they gained sentience: hooky bubblegrunge, alt-rock buzzsaw guitars, chunky 90s-leaning riffs." Luke Winstanley, rating the album seven in his Clash review, opined that the album represents a "largely enjoyable opening statement" as "the latest act to successfully lean into" alternative rock of the 1990s.

== Track listing ==
All tracks are written by Lola Sam and Tallulah Sim-Savage; "Strange to Be Here" and "Hard Goodbye" written with Steph Marziano.

Hot Shock track listing
No.	Title	Length
1.	"She's Got a Problem"	2:08
2.	"Wanna Be a Doll"	2:46
3.	"Strange to Be Here"	3:02
4.	"Dress Our Love"	2:57
5.	"Hard Goodbye"	2:50
6.	"One More Reason"	3:01
7.	"In Her Bedroom"	3:15
8.	"Lights On" (with Stella Mozgawa)	2:44
9.	"Chip My Teeth for You"	3:06
10.	"Pharmacy"	2:27
Total length:		28:16

== Personnel ==
Credits adapted from Tidal.

=== HotWax ===
- Lola Sam – bass, guitar, synthesizer, background vocals
- Alfie Sayers – drums (tracks 1–7, 9)
- Tallulah Sim-Savage – vocals, guitar

=== Additional contributors ===
- Catherine Marks – production (1–7, 9)
- Steph Marziano – production (1–7, 9)
- Stella Mozgawa – production (8, 10), drums (8)
- Adele Phillips – engineering (1–7, 9)
- Kristina Rhodes – engineering (1–7, 9)
- Omar Yakar Jr. – engineering (8, 10)
- Neil Comber – mixing
- Matt Colton – mastering

== Charts ==
Chart performance for Hot Shock
Chart (2025)	Peak position
UK Albums (OCC)	38
UK Independent Albums (OCC)	2
Scottish Albums (OCC)	10
