= Pretty on the Internet =

Studio album by The K's
- Released: 25 July 2025
- Genres: Alternative rock; indie rock
- Length: 46:53
- Label: LAB Records
- Producer: Jim Lowe

The K's chronology
I Wonder If the World Knows? (2024)	Pretty on the Internet (2025)

Singles from Pretty on the Internet
- 1. "Breakdown In My Bedroom" Released: 5 February 2025; 2. "Gravestone" Released: 12 March 2025; 3. "Helen, Oh I" Released: 16 April 2025; 4. "The Bends (Here We Go Again)" Released: 14 May 2025; 5. "Me and Your Sister" Released: 25 June 2025; 6. "Rat Poison" Released: 23 July 2025

Pretty on the Internet is the second studio album by English rock band The K's. The album was released on 25 July 2025 through Lab Records. The album is the band's first UK number-one album.

== Track listing ==
All tracks are written by Jamie Boyle, except where noted.

No.	Title	Writer(s)	Length
1.	"Before I Hit The Floor"	Boyle; Ryan Breslin	3:33
2.	"Rat Poison"	Boyle; Breslin; Dexter Baker	3:34
3.	"Breakdown In My Bedroom"		3:33
4.	"The Bends (Here We Go Again)"		3:55
5.	"Helen, Oh I"		5:22
6.	"Picking Up The Pieces"	Boyle; Baker	3:22
7.	"Me and Your Sister"	Boyle; Breslin	3:38
8.	"33 Heads"		3:57
9.	"Sold It, Own It"	Boyle; Breslin	4:20
10.	"Running Away Now"	Boyle; Baker	3:34
11.	"Gravestone"		3:55
12.	"Perfect Haunting"		4:12
Total length:			46:53

== Charts ==
Chart performance for Pretty On The Internet
Chart (2025)	Peak position
Scottish Albums (Official Charts)	1
UK Albums (Official Charts)	1
UK Independent Albums (Official Charts)	1
