= Ballad of a Bystander =

Studio album by the Reytons
- Released: 26 January 2024
- Length: 37:45
- Producer: David Watts

The Reytons chronology
What's Rock and Roll? (2023)	Ballad of a Bystander (2024)	A Love Letter to a Broken Town (2026)

Singles from Ballad of a Bystander
- 1. "Let Me Breathe" Released: 27 September 2023; 2. "Market Street" Released: 10 November 2023; 3. "Listen" Released: 15 December 2023; 4. "Nineteen Crimes" Released: 12 January 2024

Ballad of a Bystander is the third studio album by English indie rock band the Reytons. It was self-released on 26 January 2024.

== Background and promotion ==
Following the release of their second studio album What's Rock and Roll? in January and the surprising commercial success, the band announced its successor only eight months later on 27 September 2023, alongside the release of the lead single "Let Me Breathe", a "a swaggering and fuzzy indie-rock tune". The second single "Market Street" was released on 10 November, and the third single "Listen" on 15 December.

In promotion of the album, the band announced a two-date homecoming gig in July 2024 at the Clifton Park venue of their hometown Rotherham, with a capacity of 20,000 people, marking the biggest outdoor event in Rotherham in over 50 years.

== Track listing ==
All tracks are written by Lee Holland, Joe O'Brien, Jamie Todd, and Jonny Yerrell. All tracks are produced by David Watts.

Ballad of a Bystander track listing
No.	Title	Length
1.	"Adrenaline"	3:00
2.	"World's Greatest Actor"	3:11
3.	"Market Street"	3:17
4.	"Let Me Breathe"	3:36
5.	"Not Today Mate"	2:41
6.	"Minus One"	3:35
7.	"Seven in Search of Ten"	3:38
8.	"Listen"	3:02
9.	"What She Won't Do"	2:42
10.	"Nineteen Crimes"	3:14
11.	"2006"	3:01
12.	"Knees Up"	2:48
Total length:		37:45

== Charts ==
Following a heated chart battle with James Arthur, the album lost out on the number one spot in what was reported to be controversial circumstances when the band were deducted over 2,000 chartable sales "following an industry complaint".

Chart performance for Ballad of a Bystander
Chart (2024)	Peak position
Scottish Albums (Official Charts)	3
UK Albums (Official Charts)	2
UK Independent Albums (Official Charts)	1
