= HotWax =

English rock band

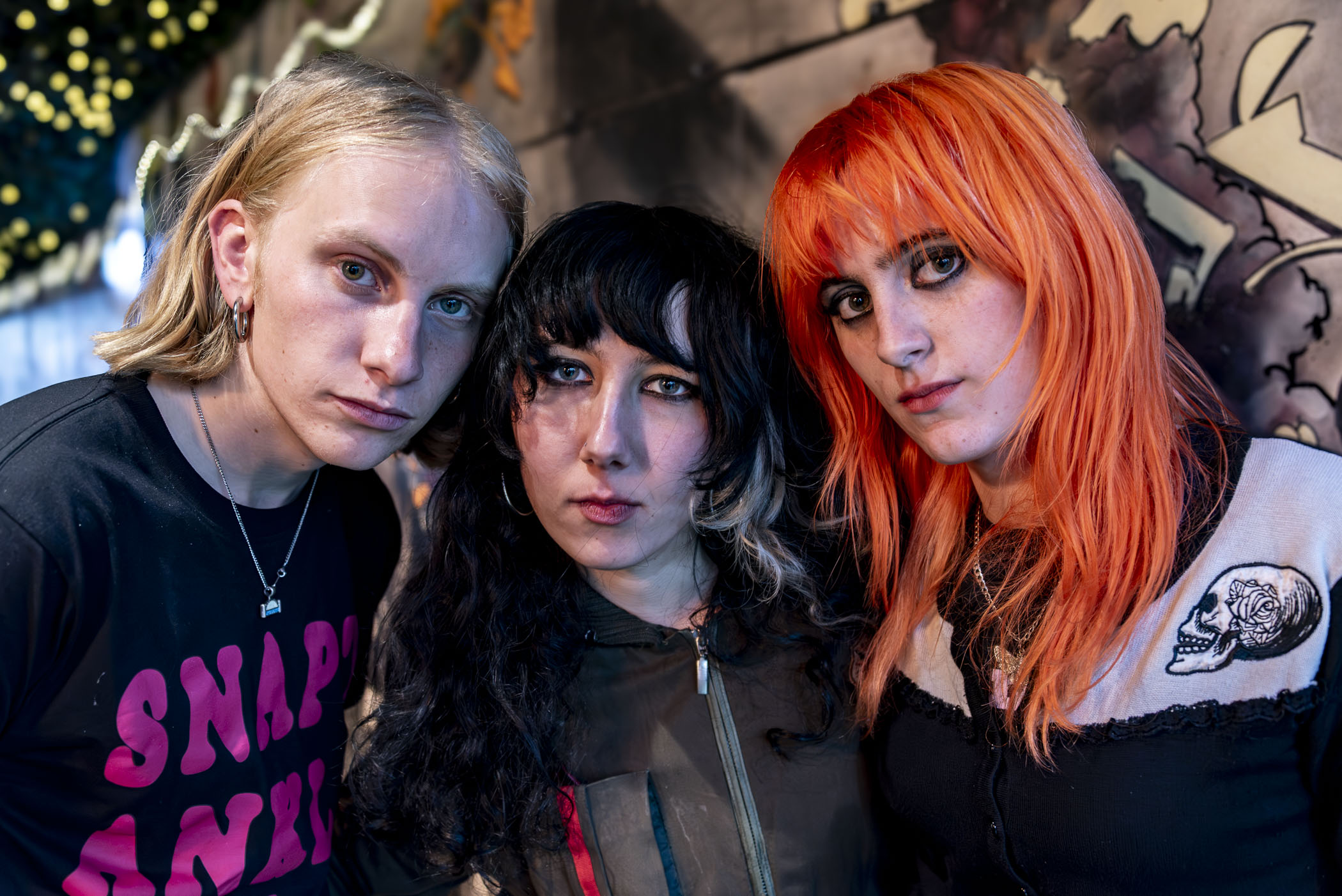
- HotWax in 2025

Background information
- Genres: Alt rock; grunge; post-punk
- Years active: 2020–present
- Labels: Marathon Artists; Transgressive Records
- Spinoff of: The Kiffs
- Members: Tallulah Sim-Savage; Lola Sam; Alfie Sayers
- Past members: Honor Wilson
- Website: www.hotwaxofficial.com

HotWax are an alternative rock trio based in Hastings, consisting of members Tallulah Sim-Savage, Lola Sam, and Alfie Sayers. They released their debut album Hot Shock in March 2025.

== Members ==
Tallulah Sim-Savage, a vocalist and guitarist, met bassist Lola Sam at secondary school in Hastings when a music teacher placed them in a group together, and the pair became close friends. As of 2017, they were members of a band called The Kiffs along with Honor Wilson, who would go on to be HotWax's initial drummer.

Sim-Savage and Sam later met drummer Alfie Sayers at a music college in Brighton, forming the current trio in 2021.

== Career ==
In 2020, HotWax began self-releasing singles, including "Stay Cool", "Pat the Killer Cat", "When We're Dead", and "Barbie (Not Yours)".

The band signed to record label Marathon Artists while publishing via Transgressive Records. They then released their debut EP A Thousand Times in May 2023 with its lead single "Treasure", and subsequent EP Invite me, kindly. Then they had a gig supporting the Pearl Harts. In spring and summer 2023, the band went on to perform at a number of festivals, including the Great Escape Festival, Mad Cool, Louis Tomlinson's Away From Home Festival in Italy, All Points East, and the Reading and Leeds Festival. They then opened for Royal Blood that autumn on tour in the UK and North America. At the end of 2023, HotWax were named one to watch in 2024 by The Independent.

== Artistry ==
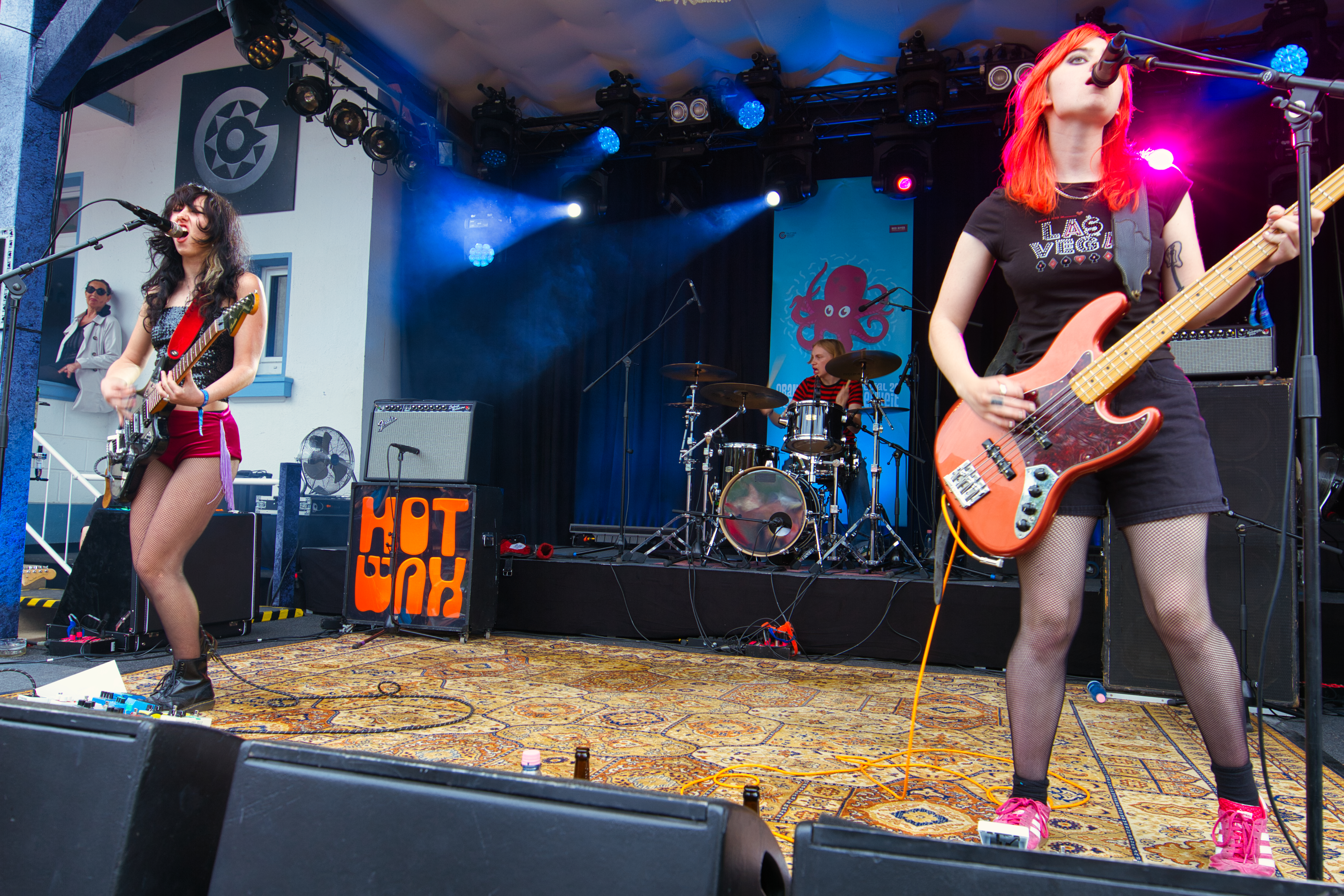
HotWax performing at Orange Blossom Special Festival, Germany 2024.

Sam grew up listening to the Beatles, Amy Winehouse, and Destiny's Child, while Sim-Savage grew up listening to country and Lady Gaga, before developing an interest in rock music through Blondie's Parallel Lines (1978) album.

Sim-Savage and Sam took inspiration from Karen O, Starcrawler, and Yeah Yeah Yeahs when formulating their vision for HotWax. Sim-Savage primarily writes the band's lyrics. The trio's debut EP A Thousand Times drew comparisons to The White Stripes, Hole, and Wolf Alice.

In March 2022, John Robb of Louder Than War described HotWax as "ripping up the template and stages with a thrilling deconstruction of their grunge roots into a post-punk landscape." In May 2023, Ed Power of The Independent identified HotWax as part of a phenomenon of young artists reviving 1990s indie rock trends, despite being too young to remember the decade. HotWax stated these influences were framed by their parents and mentors, but that they were not defined by them.

== Discography ==
=== Studio album ===
- Hot Shock (2025)

=== EPs ===
- A Thousand Times (2023)
- Invite Me, Kindly (2023)

=== Singles ===
- "Stay Cool" (2020)
- "Pat the Killer Cat" (2020)
- "Baked Beans" (2020)
- "When We're Dead" (2021)
- "Barbie (Not Yours)" (2022)
- "Treasure" (2023)
- "Drop" (2023)
- "She's Got A Problem" (2024)
- "Wanna Be A Doll" (2024)
- "One More Reason" (2025)
- "Strange To Be Here" (2025)
- "Tell Me Everything's Alright" (2025)
