= Be Opened by the Wonderful =

Studio album by James
- Released: 9 June 2023
- Studio: Blueprint, Manchester, England
- Length: 90:22
- Label: Nothing but Love Music
- Producer: Brendan Williams

James chronology
All the Colours of You (2021)	Be Opened by the Wonderful (2023)	Yummy (2024)

Singles from Be Opened by the Wonderful
- 1. "Love Make a Fool" Released: 26 April 2023

Be Opened by the Wonderful is the 17th studio album by English rock band James, released through Nothing but Love Music on 9 June 2023. It contains orchestral reworkings of the band's songs from the Orca 22 orchestra led by Andra Vornici, also accompanied by the eight-person Manchester Inspirational Voices gospel choir, along with the new song and lead single "Love Make a Fool". Orca 22 also accompanied James on their 40th anniversary tour to support the record. The album debuted at number three on the UK Albums Chart.

== Critical reception ==
Professional ratings
Review scores
Source	Rating
XS Noize	3.5/5 stars

Natalie Royle of Louder Than War wrote that "James have resisted the more obvious commercial route of simply repackaging their biggest hits", calling it "not only a showcase of some amazing James songs, it also is a masterclass in song rearrangement by Joe Duddell". Royle remarked that "there are so many layers and details to these songs and I am still discovering more after numerous listens". Iam Burn of XS Noize described it as "an alternative version of a greatest hits album – though there are several lesser-known tracks here too" and found that the presence of the orchestra and choir "allows James to find a new sound that works well". Rob Johnson of Total Ntertainment felt that the album "defies definition" and "acts as a sonic compendium of the band's entire career", also commenting that "for a band celebrating their 40th anniversary, it is striking how relevant they still sound".

== Track listing ==
Disc one
No.	Title	Length
1.	"Sometimes"	6:03
2.	"Love Make a Fool"	4:45
3.	"We're Gonna Miss You"	4:32
4.	"Tomorrow"	4:20
5.	"The Lake"	5:16
6.	"She's a Star"	3:54
7.	"Lookaway"	3:58
8.	"Sit Down"	4:37
9.	"Alaskan Pipeline"	5:58

Disc two
No.	Title	Length
1.	"Someone's Got It in for Me"	4:34
2.	"Hey Ma"	4:44
3.	"Hello"	4:51
4.	"Beautiful Beaches"	3:24
5.	"Why So Close"	1:43
6.	"Medieval"	4:14
7.	"Hymn from a Village"	3:37
8.	"Say Something"	4:54
9.	"Top of the World"	4:53
10.	"Moving On"	6:25
11.	"Laid"	3:40
Total length:		90:22

== Charts ==
Chart performance for Be Opened by the Wonderful
Chart (2023)	Peak position
Portuguese Albums (AFP)	38
Scottish Albums (OCC)	2
UK Albums (OCC)	3
