= The K's =

British indie band

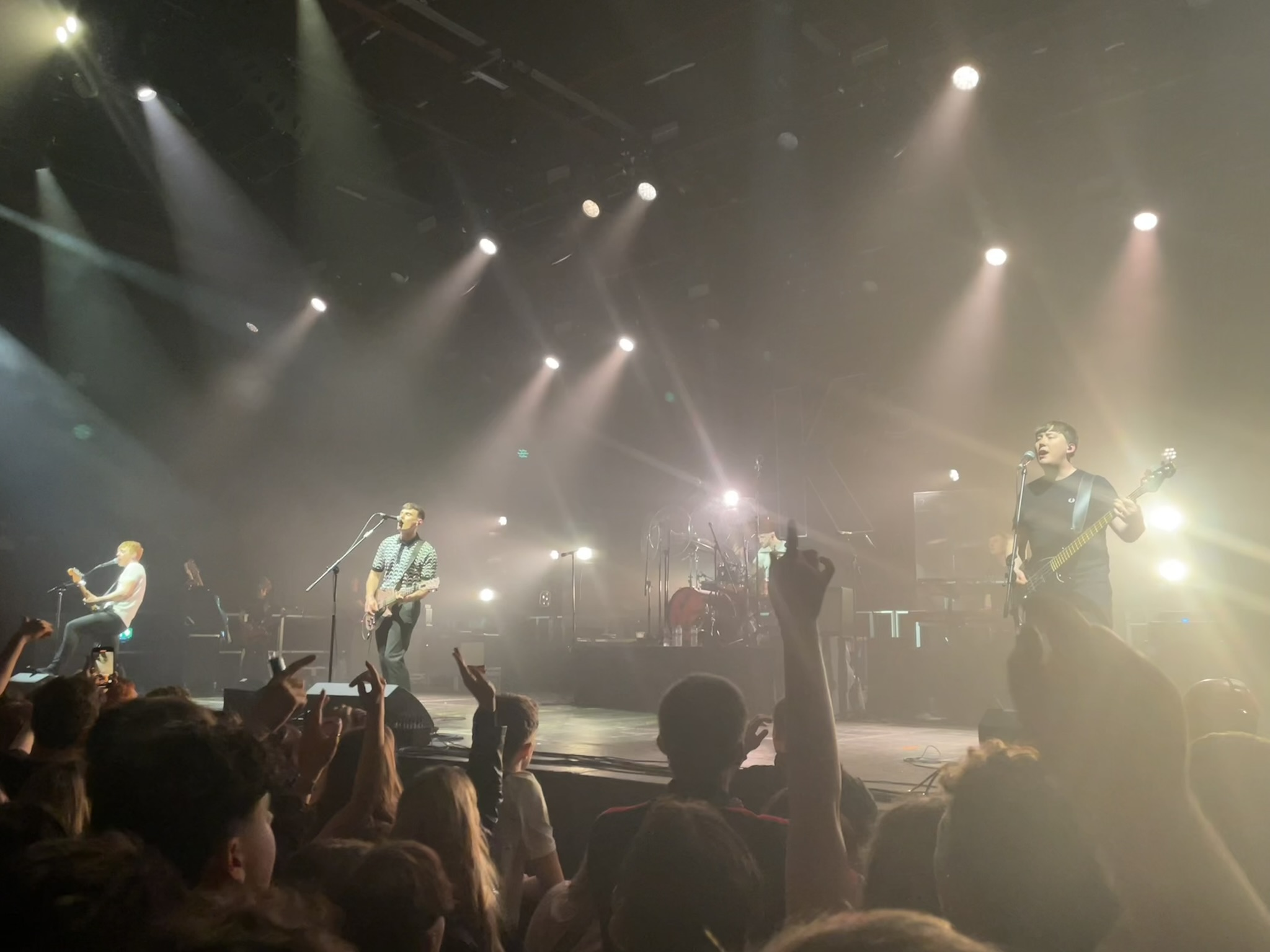
- The K's performing at Victoria Warehouse in 2024

Background information
- Origin: Earlestown, Merseyside, England
- Genre: Indie rock
- Years active: 2017–present
- Label: LAB
- Members: Jamie Boyle; Ryan Breslin; Dexter Baker; Nathan Peers
- Past members: Chris Holleran; Jordan Holden
- Website: theks.band

The K's are an English indie rock band from Earlestown, Merseyside. They are formed of singer/songwriter and guitarist Jamie Boyle, lead guitarist Ryan Breslin, bassist Dexter Baker and drummer Nathan Peers.

The band have released two studio albums, 2024's I Wonder If the World Knows? and 2025's Pretty on the Internet, the latter of which peaked at number one on the UK Albums Chart. The band won the "Breakthrough Act of the Year" award at the inaugural Northern Music Awards in 2024.

== History ==
=== 2017–2020: Early years ===
Jamie Boyle and Dexter Baker met in nursery, and in high school the pair later met Ryan Breslin who was 2 years above the pair.

The band released their first single "Sarajevo" on 28 July 2017. Since then, the band have gigged relentlessly, and started to build up a following, especially in the north-west of England.

In 2019, the band released the singles "Aurora", "Glass Towns" and "Got A Feeling".

=== 2023–2024: I Wonder If the World Knows? ===
The band released their debut album, I Wonder If the World Knows?, on 5 April 2024. It debuted at number three on the UK Albums Chart on 12 April 2024.

=== 2025–present: Pretty on the Internet ===
The band's second studio album, Pretty on the Internet, was released on 25 July 2025, and debuted at number one on the UK Albums Chart.

In summer 2026, the band played two big headline shows at Manchester's Castlefield Bowl and Halifax's Piece Hall.

== Band members ==
Current members

- Jamie Boyle – lead vocals, guitar (2016–present)
- Ryan Breslin – guitar, backing vocals (2016–present)
- Dexter Baker – bass guitar (2016–present)
- Nathan Peers – drums (2023–present)

Former members

- Chris Holleran – drums (2016–2018)
- Jordan Holden – drums (2018–2022)

Touring Members

- Luis Sullivan - keyboards, backing vocals (2024-present)

== Discography ==
=== Studio albums ===
List of studio albums, with selected details and chart positions
Title	Details	Peak chart positions	
Title	Details	UK	SCO
I Wonder If the World Knows?	Released: 5 April 2024; Label: LAB; Formats: Cassette, CD, digital download, LP, streaming	3	3
Pretty on the Internet	Released: 25 July 2025; Label: LAB; Formats: Cassette, CD, digital download, LP, streaming	1	1
