= Yummy (James album) =

- Standard edition of the album; the deluxe edition has yellow and pink sides.

Studio album by James
- Released: 12 April 2024
- Studio: Abbey Road, London, England, UK
- Length: 53:32
- Label: Nothing But Love; Virgin
- Producer: Leo Abrahams

James chronology
Be Opened by the Wonderful (2023)	Yummy (2024)

Singles from Yummy
- 1. "Is This Love" Released: 15 January 2024; 2. "Our World" Released: 29 February 2024; 3. "Life's a Fucking Miracle" Released: 29 March 2024

Yummy is the eighteenth studio album by British indie rock band James, released through Nothing But Love and Virgin Music on 12 April 2024. It received positive reviews from critics.

== Recording ==
Yummy consists of 12 tracks written by James members Tim Booth, Jim Glennie, Saul Davies and Mark Hunter. It is their first studio release as a nine-piece. Produced by Leo Abrahams, it was later mixed by Cenzo Townshend and mastered by Frank Arkwright at Abbey Road Studios.

A second, more experimental album, Pudding, was recorded during the sessions for Yummy, and consists mainly of unfinished demos and jams similar to James' 1994 work Wah Wah. This was included as a bonus disc on the deluxe edition of Yummy.

The album does not feature regular James drummer David Baynton-Power, although he is featured on the inside cover. His drum parts are mostly played by Davies and Deborah Knox-Hewson. There are also a great number of guest musicians contributing, notably producer Abrahams and Peter Glennie, brother of Jim.

== Reception ==
According to the review aggregator Metacritic, Yummy received "generally favorable reviews" based on a weighted average score of 79 out of 100 from four critic scores. Writing for Clash Music, Emma Harrison called this album "an inspired, thought-provoking work" that is "joyful and uplifting throughout", across "twelve astute tracks that tackle all manner of themes that tackle everything from AI and ageism to mental life and mortality and everything in-between" and rated Yummy an 8 out of 10. Hot Press' John Walshe also scored this 8 out of 10, calling it "like a poppier OK Computer" that is "brimming over with soaring melodies and toe-tapping rhythms". At Louder Than War, Yummy was named Album of the Week and critic David Brown called this "one of their strongest collections of [James'] career", representing "the sound of a band refusing to rest on their laurels, in love with their creative process and looking forward rather than backwards".

== Track listing ==
All lyrics are written by Tim Booth; all music is composed by Tim Booth, James Glennie, Saul Davies, Mark Hunter.

Yummy
No.	Title	Length
1.	"Is This Love"	3:39
2.	"Life's a Fucking Miracle"	4:15
3.	"Better with You"	4:38
4.	"Stay"	3:45
5.	"Shadow of a Giant"	6:18
6.	"Way Over Your Head"	4:19
7.	"Mobile God"	4:49
8.	"Our World"	4:17
9.	"Rogue"	4:12
10.	"Hey"	4:34
11.	"Butterfly"	5:00
12.	"Folks"	3:53

Website exclusive digital download bonus tracks
No.	Title	Length
13.	"If You Wanna Grow Old"	4:52
14.	"Rain On"	3:34
15.	"Hard to Imagine"	3:53
16.	"Pieces of Gum"	5:39

Pudding (deluxe edition CD2, unreleased tracks and demos)
No.	Title	Length
1.	"Anyone but You"	3:57
2.	"Close Enough"	3:46
3.	"Mine to Lose"	4:35
4.	"Activist Song"	7:09
5.	"Won't Be the Same"	4:19
6.	"Tell Me Something"	3:47
7.	"Poolewe Day1Jam4"	6:30
8.	"Arpen Charp"	4:08
9.	"Deliver the Dawn"	4:23
10.	"Something of a Pleasure"	4:53
11.	"Walk Tall"	4:06
12.	"50s Out Takes"	4:09

== Personnel ==
James

- Chloe Alper – background vocals, additional vocal arrangements
- Tim Booth – lead vocals
- Saul Davies – guitar; drums on "Shadow of a Giant", "Rogue", "Hey", and "Butterfly"; violin on "Shadow of a Giant"; percussion on "Is This Love" and "Way Over Your Head"; keyboards on "Butterfly"; background vocals on "Way Over Your Head" and "Hey"
- Andy Diagram – trumpet, whistle on "Our World", background vocals on "Way Over Your Head"
- Debbie Knox-Hewson – drums on "Is This Love", "Better with You", "Shadow of a Giant", "Rogue", and "Hey"
- Jim Glennie – bass guitar; background vocals on "Way Over Your Head", "Our World", and "Hey"
- Mark Hunter – keyboards; piano on "Is This Love", "Shadow of a Giant", and "Butterfly"; bass guitar on "Way Over Your Head"; guitar on "Way Over Your Head"; percussion on "Way Over Your Head"; background vocals on "Way Over Your Head"
- Adrian Oxaal – guitar on "Way Over Your Head", "Mobile God", "Hey", and "Butterfly"; cello on "Is This Love", "Better with You", "Shadow of a Giant", "Our World", and "Folks"; background vocals on "Way Over Your Head"

Additional personnel

- Leo Abrahams – bass guitar on "Is This Love", "Life's a Fucking Miracle", "Way Over Your Head", "Mobile God", and "Butterfly"; guitar on all tracks except "Is This Love"; keyboards on all tracks except "Is This Love" and "Butterfly"; Mellotron on "Is This Love"; programming on all tracks except "Way Over Your Head"; strings arrangements on "Hey" and "Folks"; synthesizer on "Butterfly"; background vocals on "Life's a Fucking Miracle", "Mobile God", and "Our World"; recording; production
- Frank Awkwright – audio mastering
- Collette Byrne – background vocals on "Mobile God"
- Sam Frank – programming on all tracks except "Shadow of a Giant" and "Folks"
- Studio Fury – design, creative direction
- Peter Glennie – programming on "Is This Love", "Life's a Fucking Miracle", "Better with You", and "Mobile God"; engineering on "Is This Love", "Life's a Fucking Miracle", "Better with You", and "Mobile God"; guitar on "Way Over Your Head"; trumpet on "Life's a Fucking Miracle"; sound effects on "Folks"; background vocals on "Is This Love", "Life's a Fucking Miracle", "Better with You", "Way Over Your Head", "Mobile God", "Our World", "Hey", and "Folks"; production on "Folks"
- Harvey Grant – keyboards on "Shadow of a Giant", synthesizer on "Better with You"
- CJ Harper – additional engineering on "Shadow of a Giant"
- Jon Hopkins – piano on "Shadow of a Giant"
- Andres Malta – engineering on "Is This Love", "Rogue", "Hey", and "Butterfly"; drums on "Rogue"; keyboards on "Butterfly"; background vocals on "Hey" and "Butterfly"
- Emma Smith – violin on "Is This Love", "Shadow of a Giant". and "Way Over Your Head"
- Serafina Steer – harp on "Is This Love"
- Studio Evo – cover image
- Alex Thomas – drums on all tracks except "Better with You", "Shadow of a Giant", and "Butterfly"
- Cenzo Townshend – mixing

== Chart performance ==
Yummy was the second James album to top the British charts, after 1998's The Best of James and the band's 19th in the top 40.

Chart performance for Yummy
Chart (2024)	Peak position
Belgian Albums (Ultratop Wallonia)	189
Portuguese Albums (AFP)	116
Spanish Albums (PROMUSICAE)	87
Scottish Albums (OCC)	2
UK Albums (OCC)	1
