= What's Rock and Roll? =

Studio album by the Reytons
- Released: 20 January 2023
- Genre: Indie rock
- Length: 34:12
- Producer: David Watts

The Reytons chronology
Kids Off the Estate (2021)	What's Rock and Roll? (2023)	Ballad of a Bystander (2024)

Singles from What's Rock & Roll?
- 1. "Avalanche" Released: 30 September 2022; 2. "Cash in Hand & Fake IDs" Released: 4 November 2022; 3. "Fading" Released: 16 December 2022; 4. "One More Reason" Released: 13 January 2023

What's Rock and Roll is the second studio album by English indie band The Reytons, self-released on 20 January 2023.

The album debuted at the top of the UK Albums Chart, marking a rare occasion of an unsigned band topping the album chart.

== Commercial performance ==
The album debuted at number 1 in the UK Albums Chart on 27 January 2023. The album sold 12,252 copies to debut at the top and was released in 32 different formats including 16 different CD versions, five different cassettes and a deluxe podcast edition. Alan Jones of Music Week commented that this number of formats might be the most for any number-one album in chart history.

== Track listing ==
What's Rock and Roll? track listing
No.	Title	Length
1.	"15 Minutes in the Algorithm"	3:13
2.	"Istanbul"	2:43
3.	"Avalanche"	3:10
4.	"Love in Transaction"	3:10
5.	"Little Bastards"	3:18
6.	"Cash in Hand & Fake IDs"	3:18
7.	"WMC"	2:35
8.	"One More Reason"	3:20
9.	"Monthly Subscription"	2:47
10.	"Fading"	3:06
11.	"It's a Fuck About"	0:57
12.	"Uninvited"	2:30
Total length:		34:12

== Charts ==
Chart performance for What's Rock and Roll?
Chart (2023)	Peak position
Scottish Albums (OCC)	1
UK Albums (OCC)	1
UK Independent Albums (OCC)	1

== Tour dates ==
List of concerts, showing date, city, venue
Date	City	Venue
5 November 2022	Stoke-on-Trent	Keele University Student Union
11 November 2022	Nottingham	Rock City
12 November 2022	Norwich	The Waterfront
18 November 2022	Coventry	Kasbah
19 November 2022	Cardiff	Tramshed
24 November 2022	Glasgow	Barrowland Ballroom
25 November 2022	Middlesbrough	Empire
26 November 2022	Leeds	O2 Academy
1 December 2022	Liverpool	O2 Academy
2 December 2022	Manchester	O2 Ritz
3 December 2022	Newcastle	NX
9 December 2022	Brighton	Chalk
10 December 2022	London	Electric Ballroom
16 March 2023	Sydney, Australia	Oxford Art Factory
17 March 2023	Melbourne, Australia	Stay Gold
18 March 2023	Brisbane, Australia	Super Fun Festival
