= The Reytons =

English alternative rock band

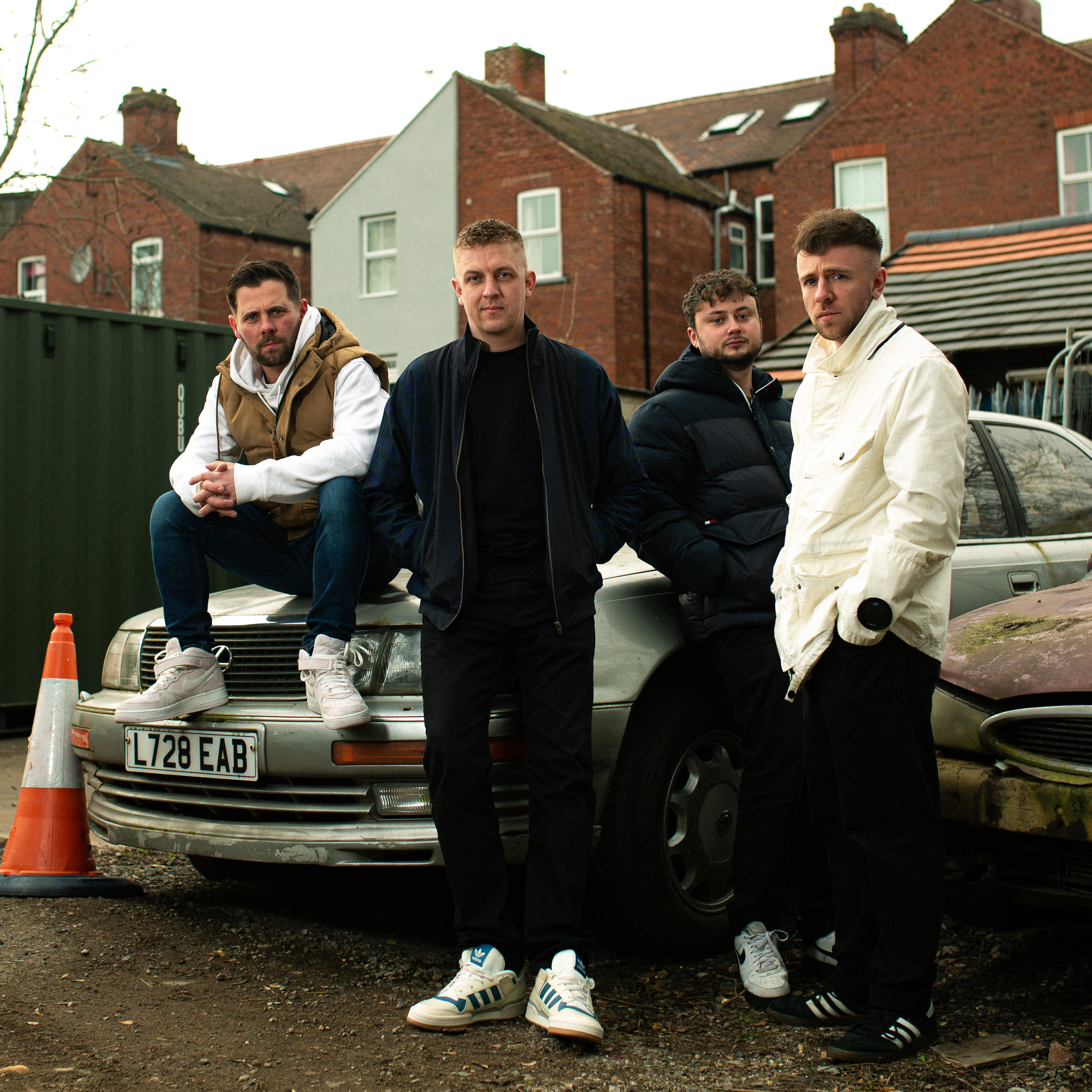
- The Reytons

Background information
- Origin: Rotherham, England
- Genres: Indie rock; garage rock; post-punk revival; alternative rock; post-Britpop
- Years active: 2017–present
- Members: Jonny Yerrell; Joe O'Brien; Lee Holland; Jamie Todd
- Website: thereytons.com

The Reytons are an English rock band from Rotherham. Band members include frontman Jonny Yerrell, lead guitarist Joe O'Brien, bass player Lee Holland, and drummer Jamie Todd.

== History ==
The band formed in 2017, with Sean O'Connor playing drums for their debut show, before subsequently stepping down. Their first gig was at the Plug club in Sheffield. They released their debut album, Kids Off the Estate, on 12 November 2021. It debuted at number eleven on the UK Albums Chart. The second album, What's Rock and Roll?, was released on 20 January 2023, scoring them their first number one on the UK Albums Chart. The release of their second album was preceded by the news that they had left their longtime record label in search of a new one. Ultimately, the band decided to remain independent.

On 26 January 2024, The Reytons released their third studio album Ballad of a Bystander. Following a heated chart battle with James Arthur, the album lost out on the number one spot in what was reported to be controversial circumstances when the band were deducted over 2,000 chartable sales "following an industry complaint".

The Reytons played their biggest show to date on 6 July 2024, with a 20,000 capacity sold-out concert in Rotherham's Clifton Park. Dubbed 'Disneyland' by the band's fans, it is the biggest live music event the town has hosted, and the most notable since T-Rex played the park's bandstand in 1971. A study by Sheffield Hallam University revealed that the event contributed £1 million to Rotherham’s economy and £1.36 million benefit for South Yorkshire.

In September 2024, the band revealed that former England and Manchester United footballer Gary Neville had joined the band in support of an upcoming UK & Ireland headline tour, although this was later revealed to be only part of a promotional campaign for the tour.

The band released the album A Love Letter to a Broken Town in July 2026, and toured the UK in October of the same year.

== Philanthropy ==
The Reytons Grassroots Foundation was set up by the band to improve access to sports and the arts. In its first year, the foundation installed football strips at 50 clubs.

== Discography ==
=== Studio albums ===
Title	Details	Peak chart position
Title	Details	UK
Kids Off the Estate	Released: 12 November 2021; Label: Scruff of the Neck; Formats: Digital download, CD, LP, cassette, streaming	11
What's Rock and Roll?	Released: 20 January 2023; Label: Self-released; Formats: Digital download, CD, LP, cassette, streaming	1
Ballad of a Bystander	Released: 26 January 2024; Label: Self-released; Formats: Digital download, CD, LP, cassette, streaming	2
A Love Letter to a Broken Town	Released: 7 August 2026; Label: Self-released; Formats: Digital download, CD, LP, cassette, streaming	1

=== Live albums ===
Title	Details	Peak chart position
Title	Details	UK
Clifton Park	Released: 13 December 2024; Label: Self-released; Formats: Digital download, streaming	5

=== Extended plays ===
Title	Details	Track listing	Peak chart position
Title	Details	Track listing	UK
It Was All So Monotonous	Released: 2017; Label: The Reytons; Formats: Digital download, streaming	1. "Slice of Lime" (2017); 2. "Eyes Down for a Full House"; 3. "Clare's Law"; 4. "Tallest Man in the Nightclub"; 5. "Billy Big Bollocks"	—
K.O.T.E.	Released: 2017; Label: The Reytons; Formats: Digital download, streaming	1. "Kids Off the Estate" (2017); 2. "Could Do Better"; 3. "Pins & Needles"; 4. "Reckless"; 5. "Take Me Home"	—
Alcopops & Charity Shops	Released: 2018; Label: The Reytons; Formats: Digital download, streaming	1. "On the Back Burner"; 2. "Harrison Lesser"; 3. "Ghost; 4. "Please Don't Call It Time"; 5. "Low Life" (2018)	—
May Seriously Harm You and Others Around You	Released: 19 February 2021; Label: Scruff of the Neck; Formats: Digital download, CD, LP, cassette, streaming	1. "Red Smoke"; 2. "Behind Enemy Lines"; 3. "Tears in the Taxi Rank"; 4. "Broke Boys Cartel"; 5. "Jealous Type"; 6. "Shoebox"	27
Roll the Dice	Released: 5 December 2025; Label: Self-released; Formats: Digital download, CD, LP, cassette, streaming	1. "Guerrilla"; 2. "Friday Knight"; 3. "Luke De Loop"; 4. "Guilt Trip"; 5. "Runaway"; 6. "Kyle"; 7. "As Good as It Gets"	27
