= List of UK Albums Chart number ones of the 2020s =

The UK Albums Chart is a weekly record chart based on album sales from Friday to Thursday in the United Kingdom. The Official Charts Company (OCC) defines an "album" as being a type of music release that feature more than four tracks and last longer than 25 minutes; sales of albums in the UK are recorded on behalf of the British music industry by the OCC and compiled weekly as the UK Albums Chart.

The chart is based on both physical and digital album sales, as well as audio streaming, and each week's new number one is first announced every Friday on The Official Chart on BBC Radio 1, which is currently hosted by Jack Saunders. The album chart is published in Music Week magazine (Top 75), and on the OCC website (Top 100). Lewis Capaldi was the first artist to top the albums chart in the 2020s with Divinely Uninspired to a Hellish Extent. In July 2020, On Sunset by Paul Weller became the 1200th album to ever top the UK Albums Chart. In November 2022, Sonder by Dermot Kennedy became the 1300th album to ever top the UK Albums Chart. In May 2025, I'm the Problem by Morgan Wallen became the 1400th album to ever top the UK Albums Chart.

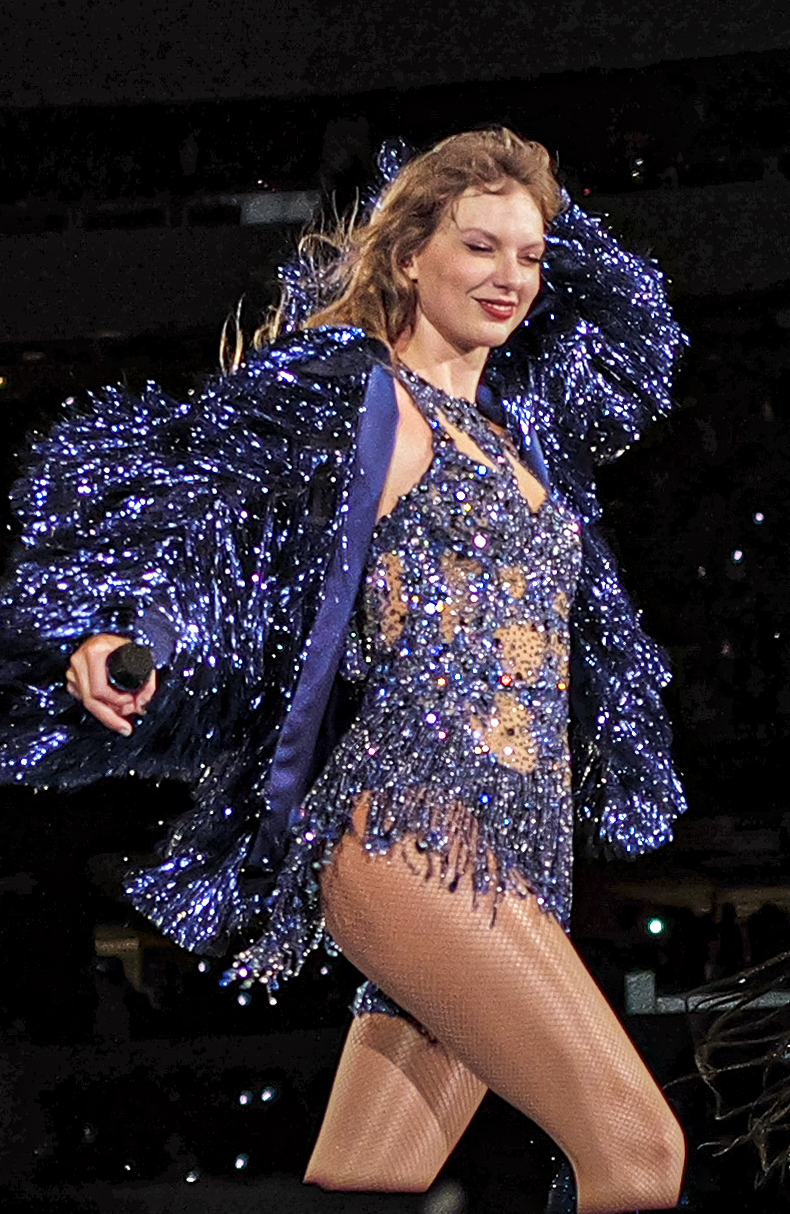
Taylor Swift broke the record for the most UK number-one albums by a female artist, surpassing Madonna. Swift also has the longest-running album of the decade so far with The Tortured Poets Department.

The following albums have all been number one in the United Kingdom during the 2020s.

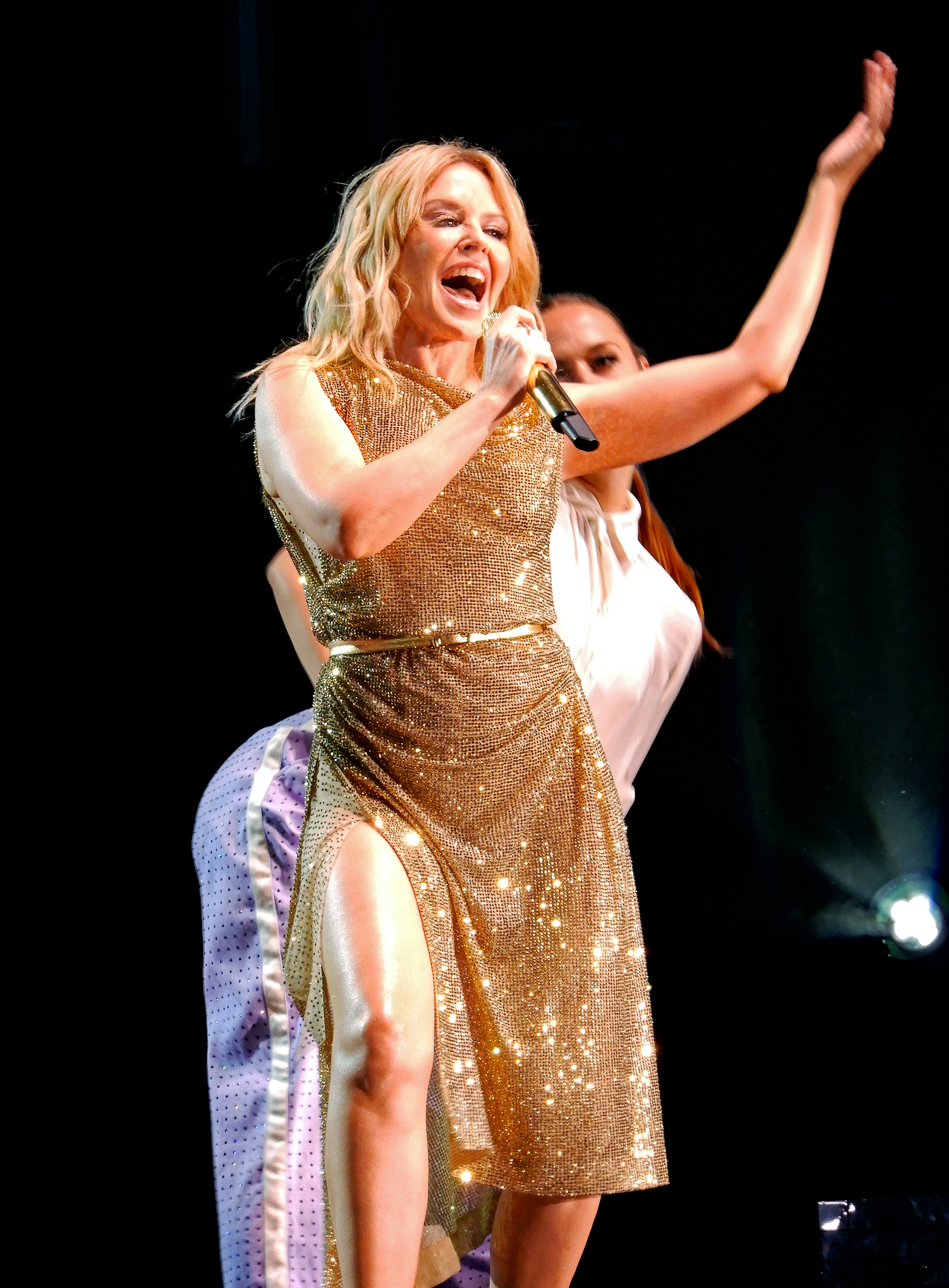
Kylie Minogue became the first female artist to earn a number-one album in five consecutive decades (1980s to 2020s) with Disco.

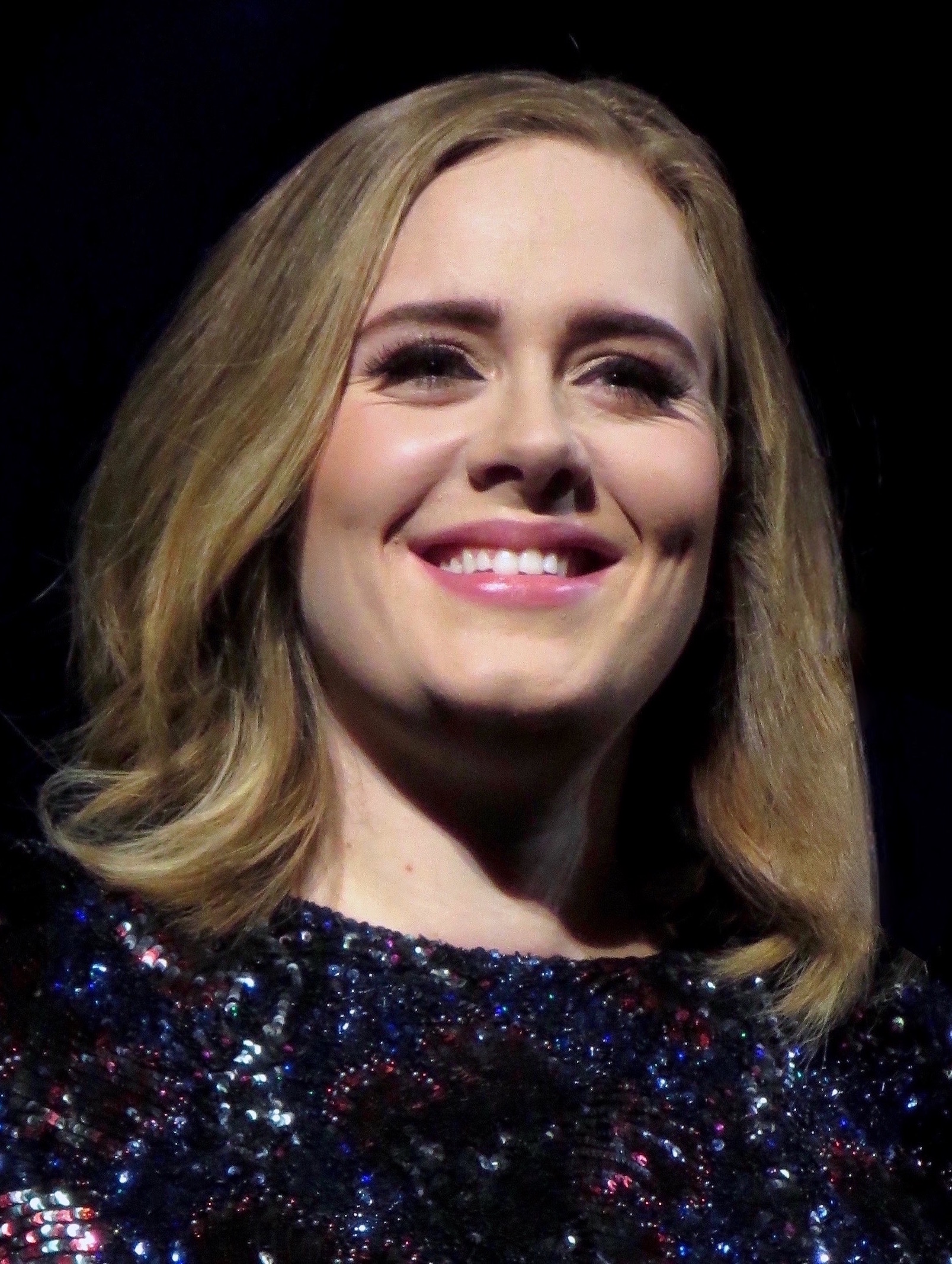
Adele scored the best-selling album of 2021 with 30.

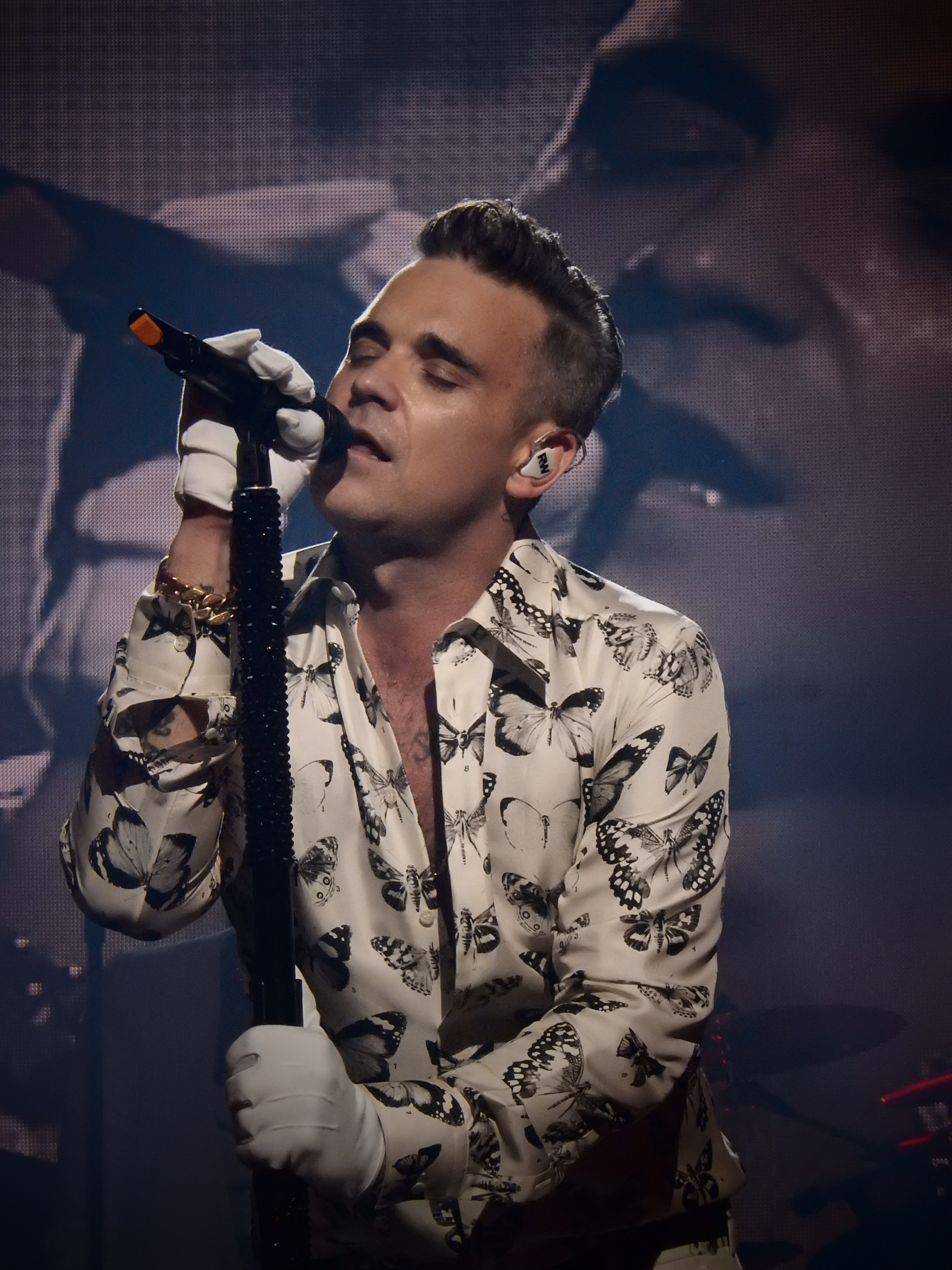
Robbie Williams surpassed the Beatles to become the artist with the most UK number-one albums with Britpop in January 2026.

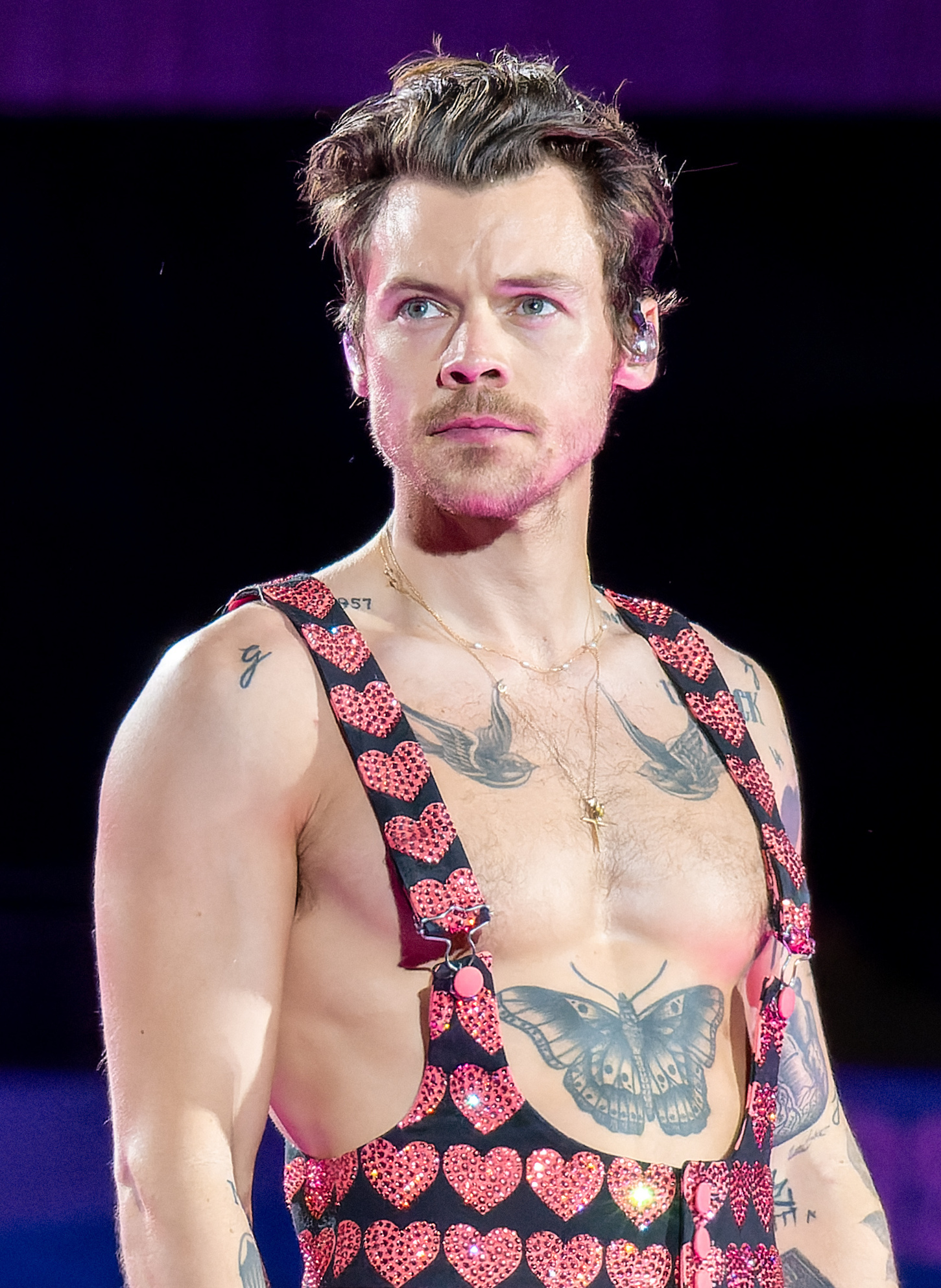
Harry Styles earned 2022's UK biggest-selling album with Harry's House, which is the longest-running number-one album by a male artist of the decade so far.

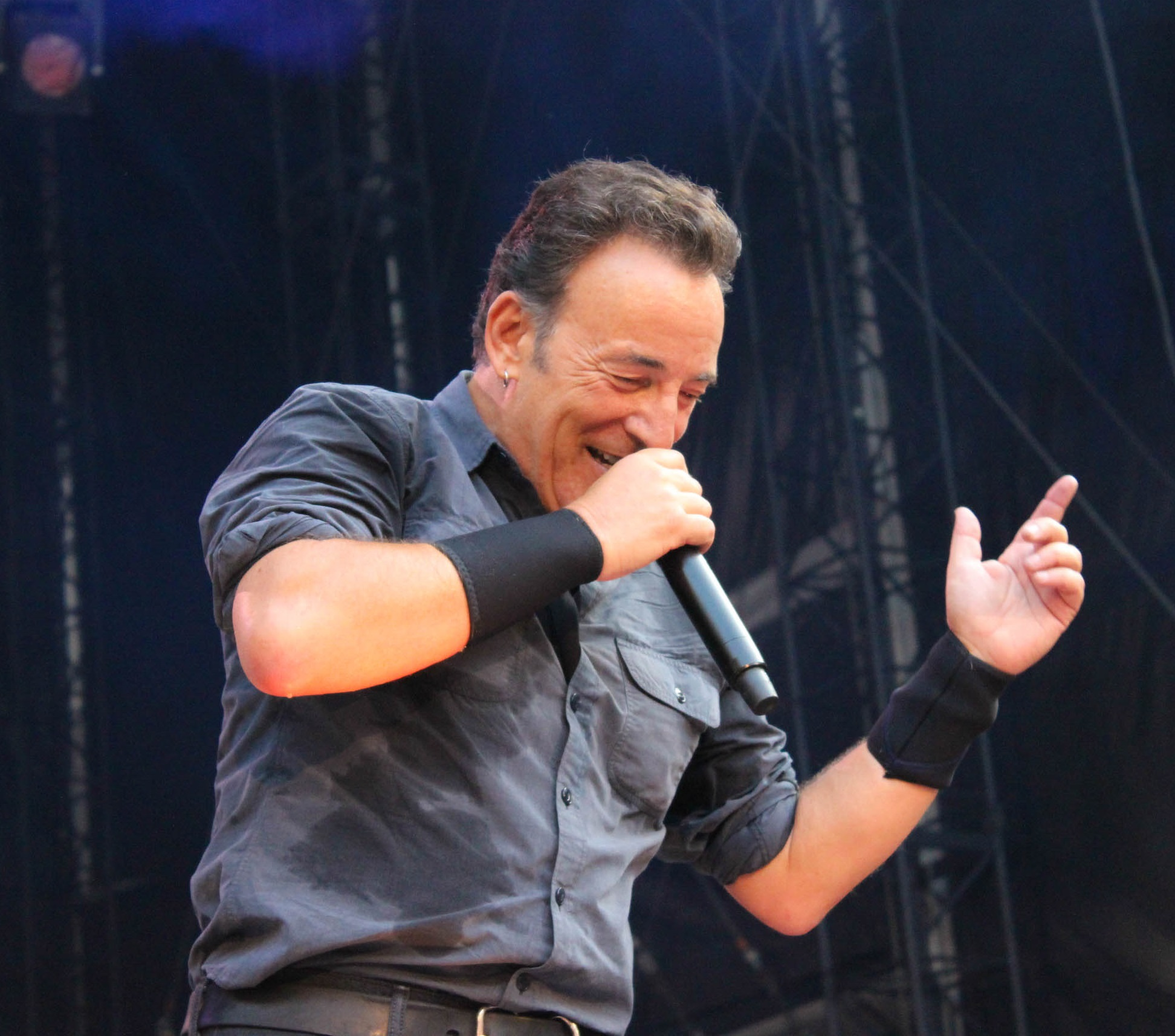
Bruce Springsteen became the first solo artist to chart at number-one in five consecutive decades (1980s to 2020s) with Letter to You.

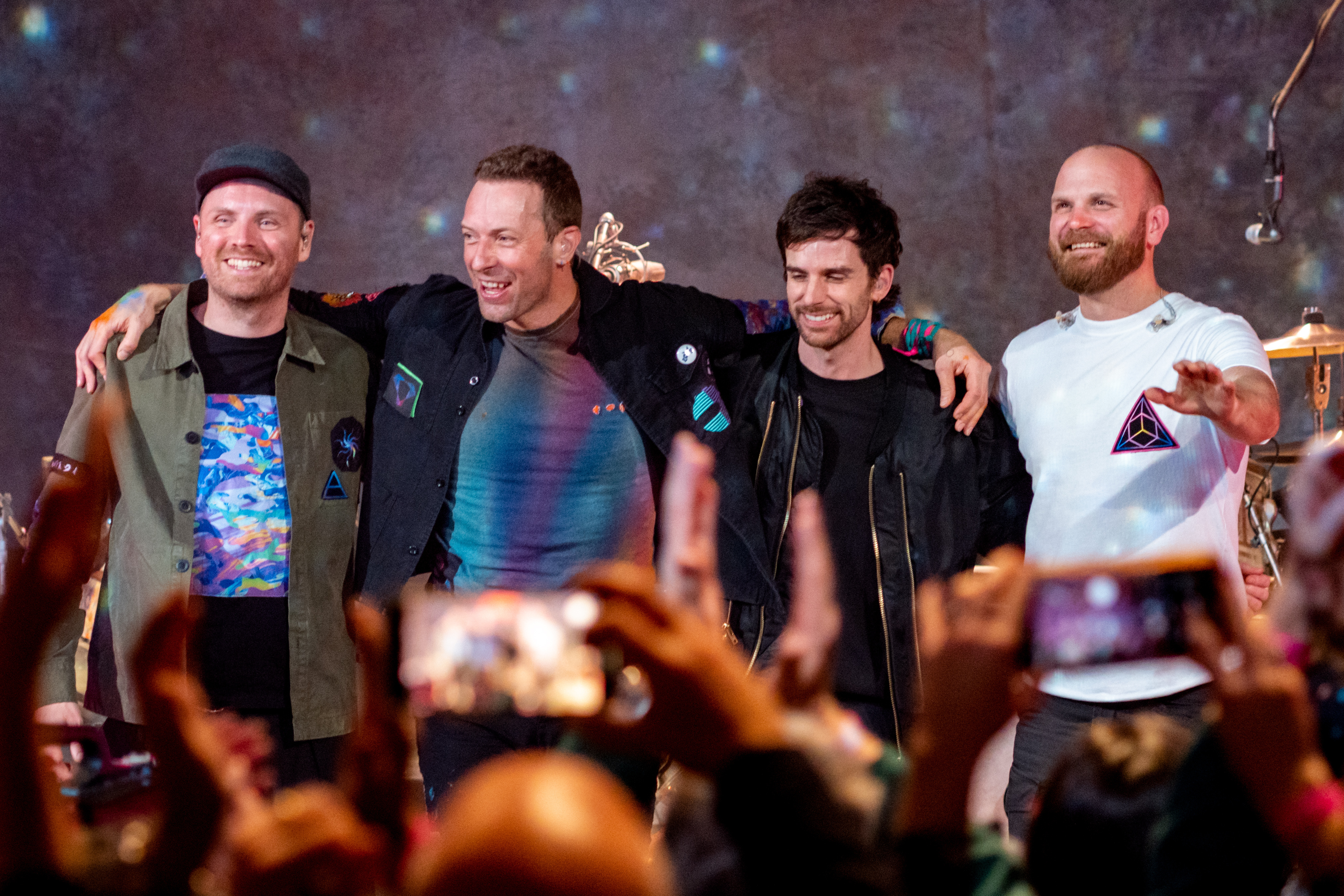
Coldplay's Music of the Spheres (2021) was the first album of the 2020s decade to sell more than 100,000 units in a single week, while Moon Music (2024) achieved the fastest sales by a group.

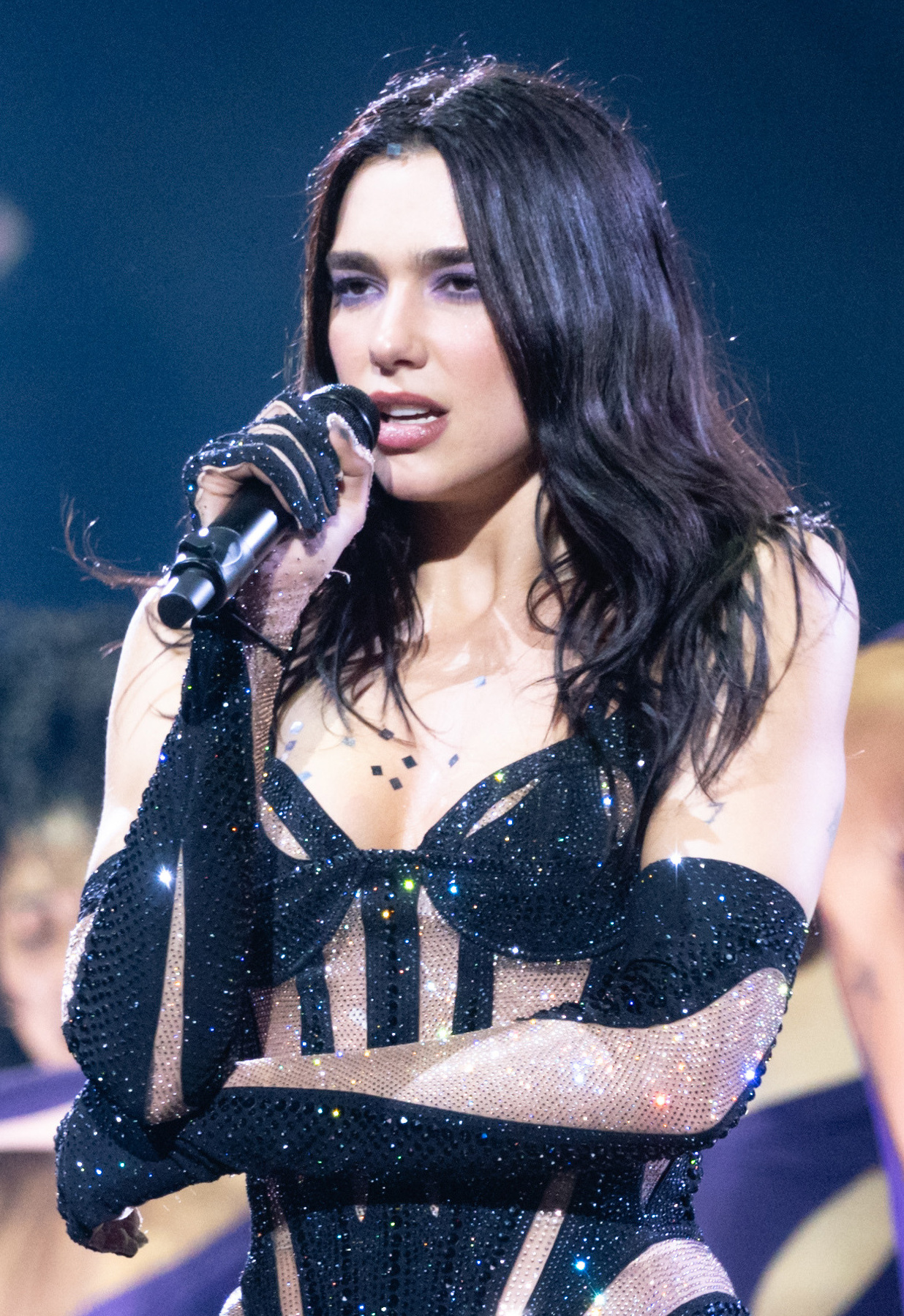
Dua Lipa earned two number-one albums in the 2020s with Future Nostalgia, and Radical Optimism.

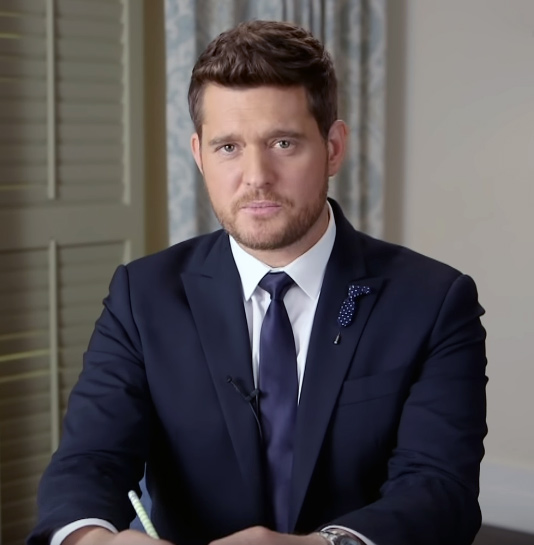
Michael Bublé's Christmas returned to the top in January 2021, the first time since 2011, and again in December 2022, 2023 and 2024, respectively.

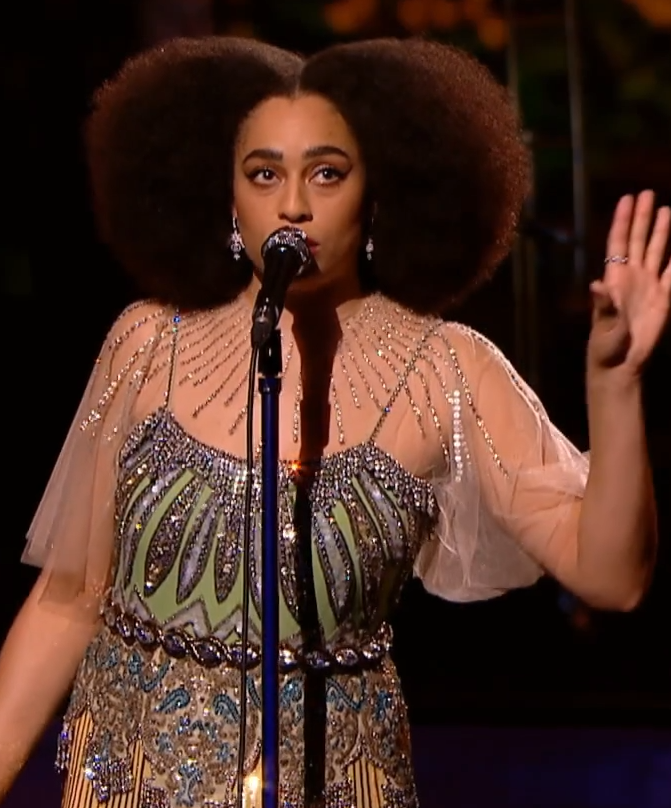
Celeste became the first British female artist in five years since Jess Glynne in 2015 to debut at number-one with Not Your Muse.

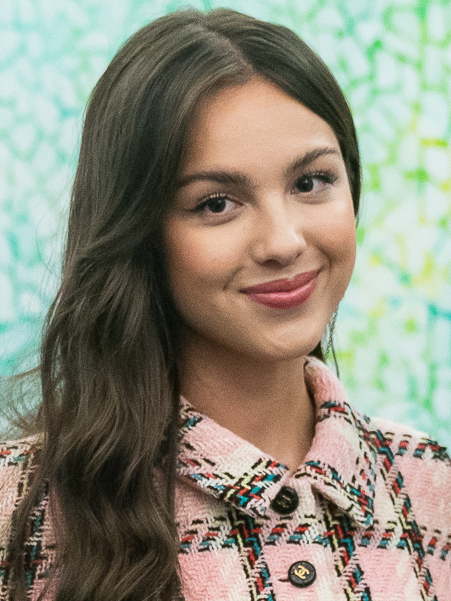
Olivia Rodrigo became the youngest artist to earn a "UK chart double" with Sour in May 2021.

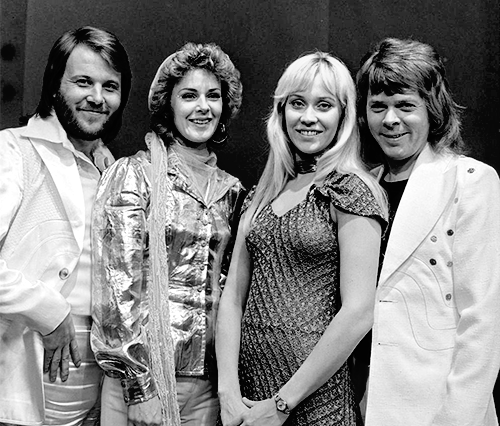
ABBA returned to the top of the albums chart in November 2021 earning their tenth number-one album with Voyage, the group's first studio album in forty years.

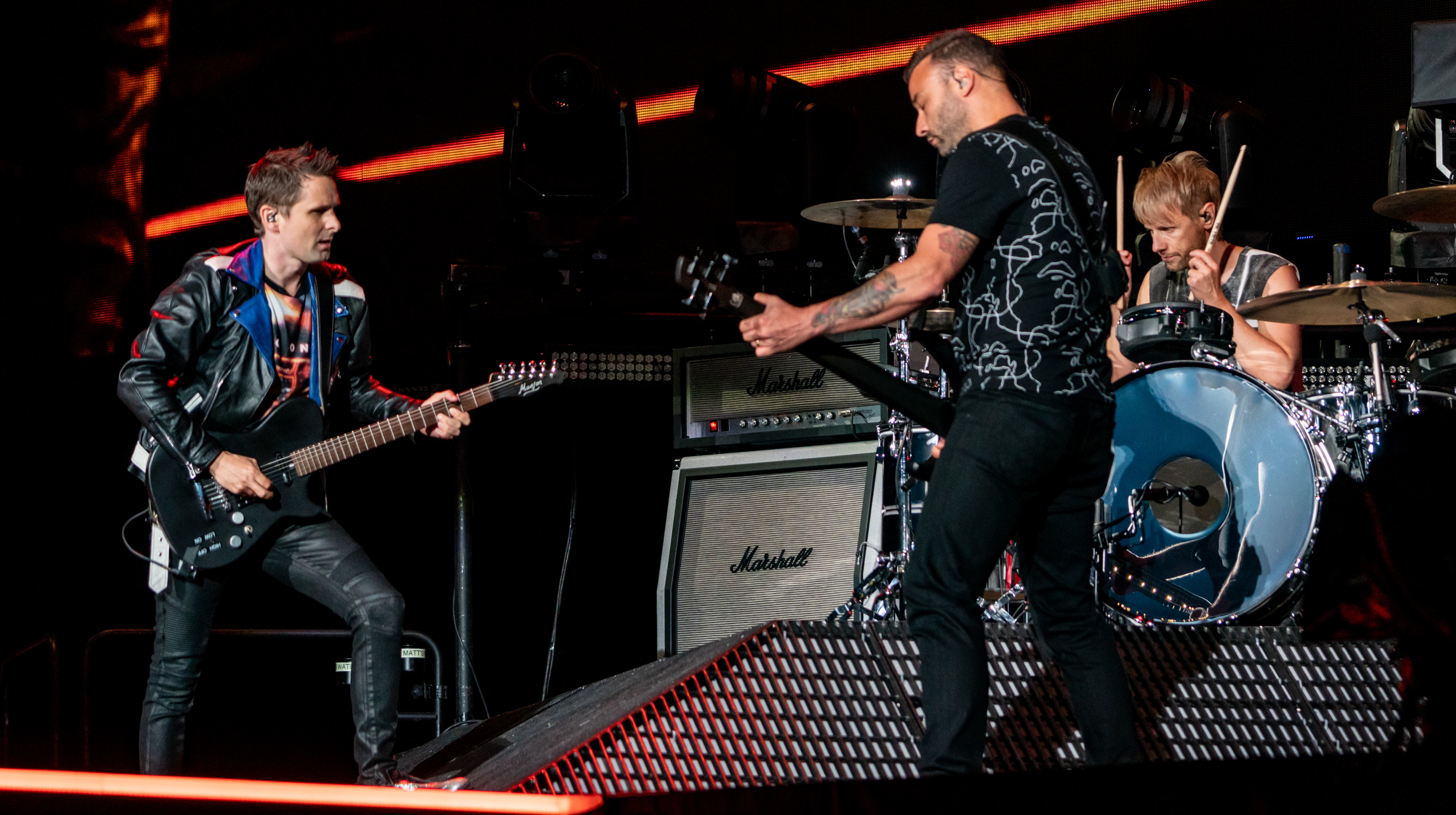
Muse made chart history in September 2022 with their album Will of the People by becoming the first album to reach number-one to incorporate NFT technology.

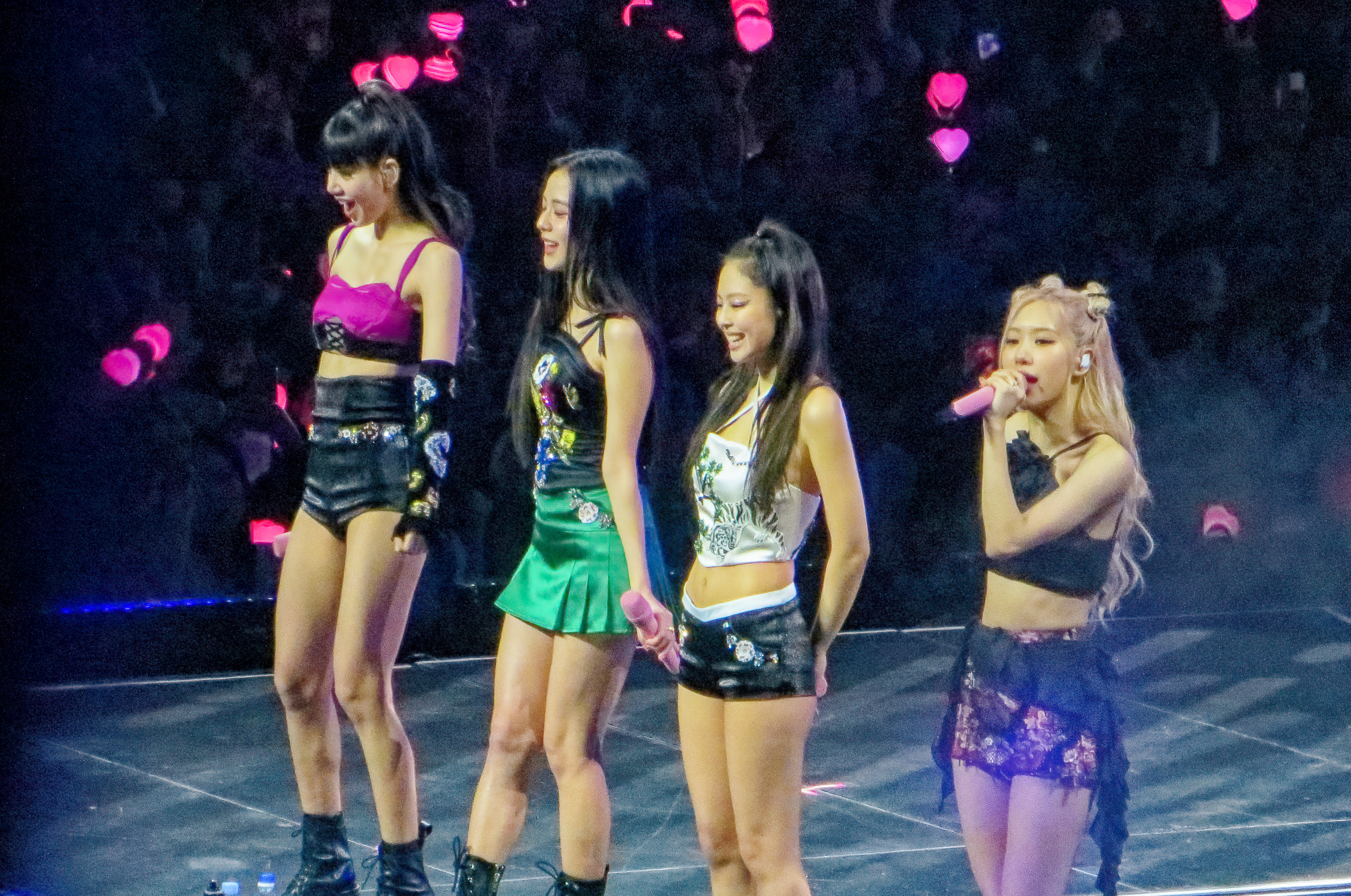
Blackpink became the first K-pop girl group to earn a UK number-one album in September 2022 with their second studio album Born Pink.

Courteeners set a new record for the longest time taken for a studio album to reach number-one when they earned their first number-one album in January 2023 following the 15th anniversary reissue of their debut album St. Jude, which originally peaked at number 4 in April 2008.

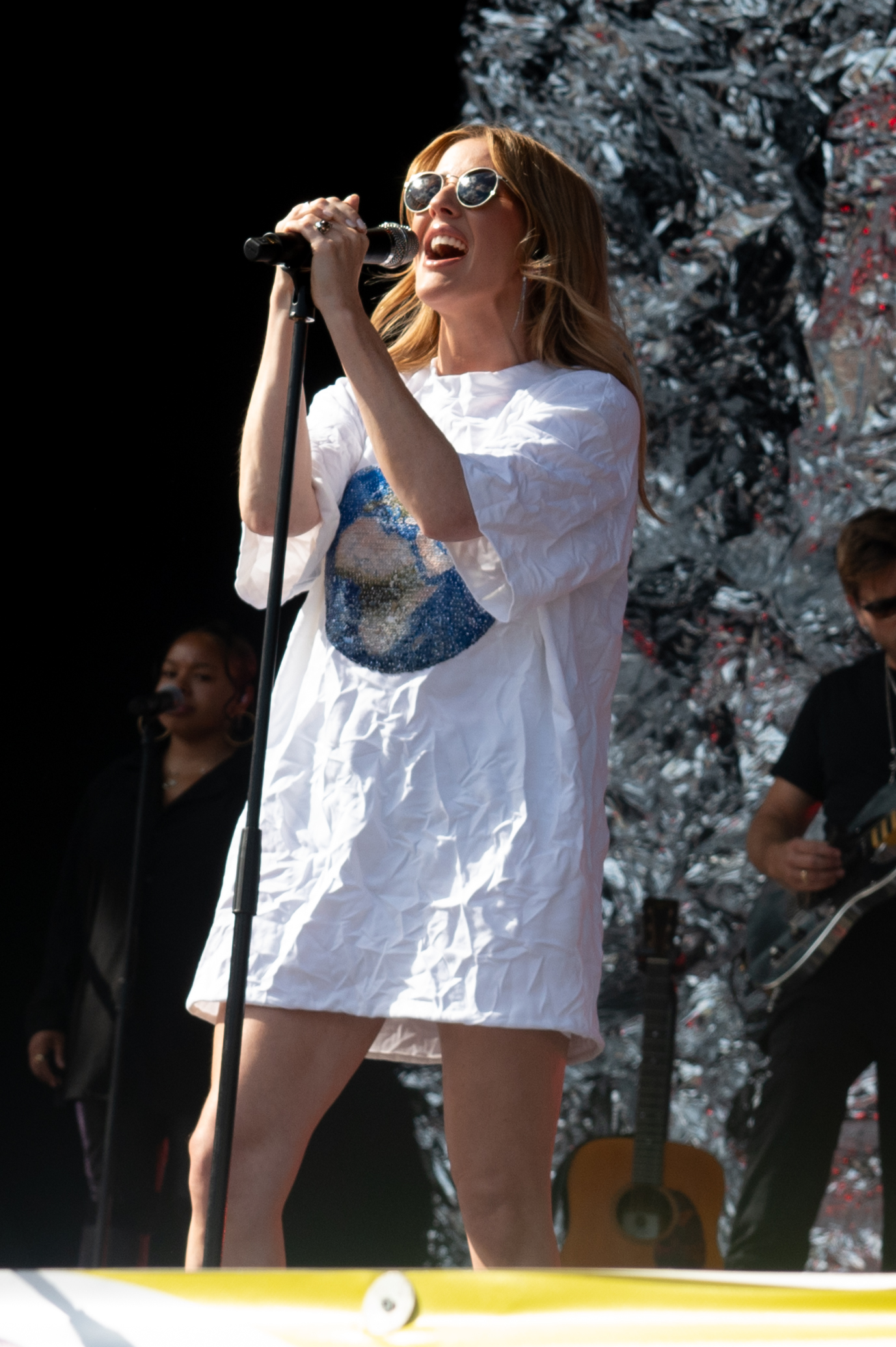
Ellie Goulding joined Adele as the British Female Solo Act with the most number-one albums in UK history, with her fourth chart-topper Higher Than Heaven in April 2023.

== Number-one albums ==
Key
No.	nth album to top the UK Albums Chart
re	Return of an album to number one
†	Best-selling album of the year

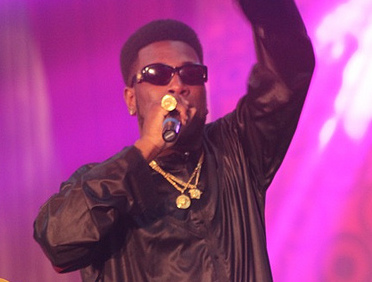
Burna Boy became the first global Afrobeats artist to earn a UK number-one album with I Told Them... in September 2023.

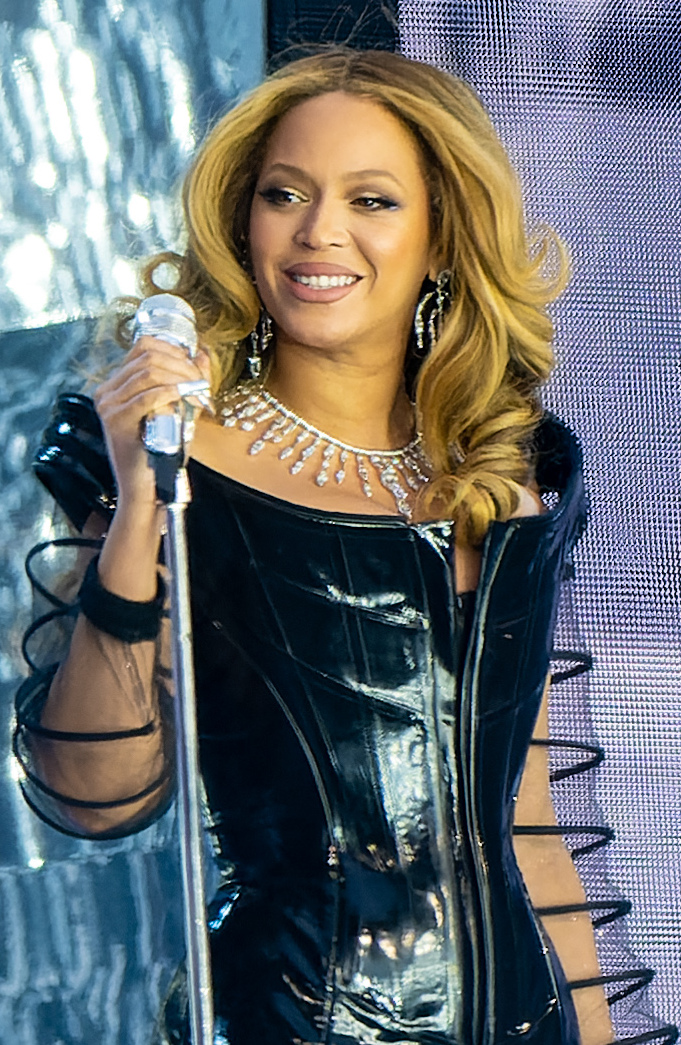
Beyoncé earned her fifth number-one album in April 2024 with Cowboy Carter, which also became the first country album by a black artist to top the UK Albums chart.

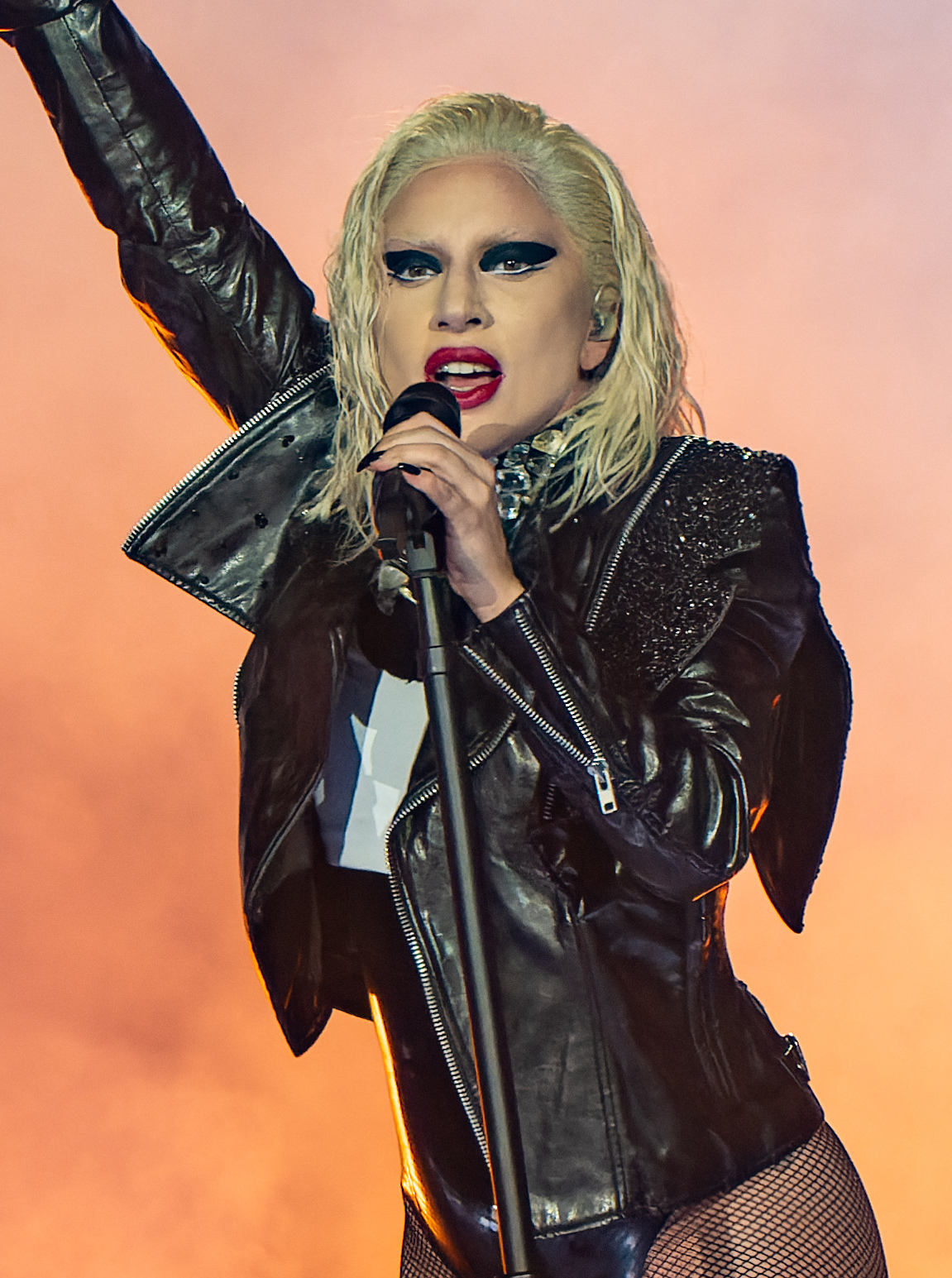
Lady Gaga earned two number-one albums this decade with Chromatica and Mayhem.

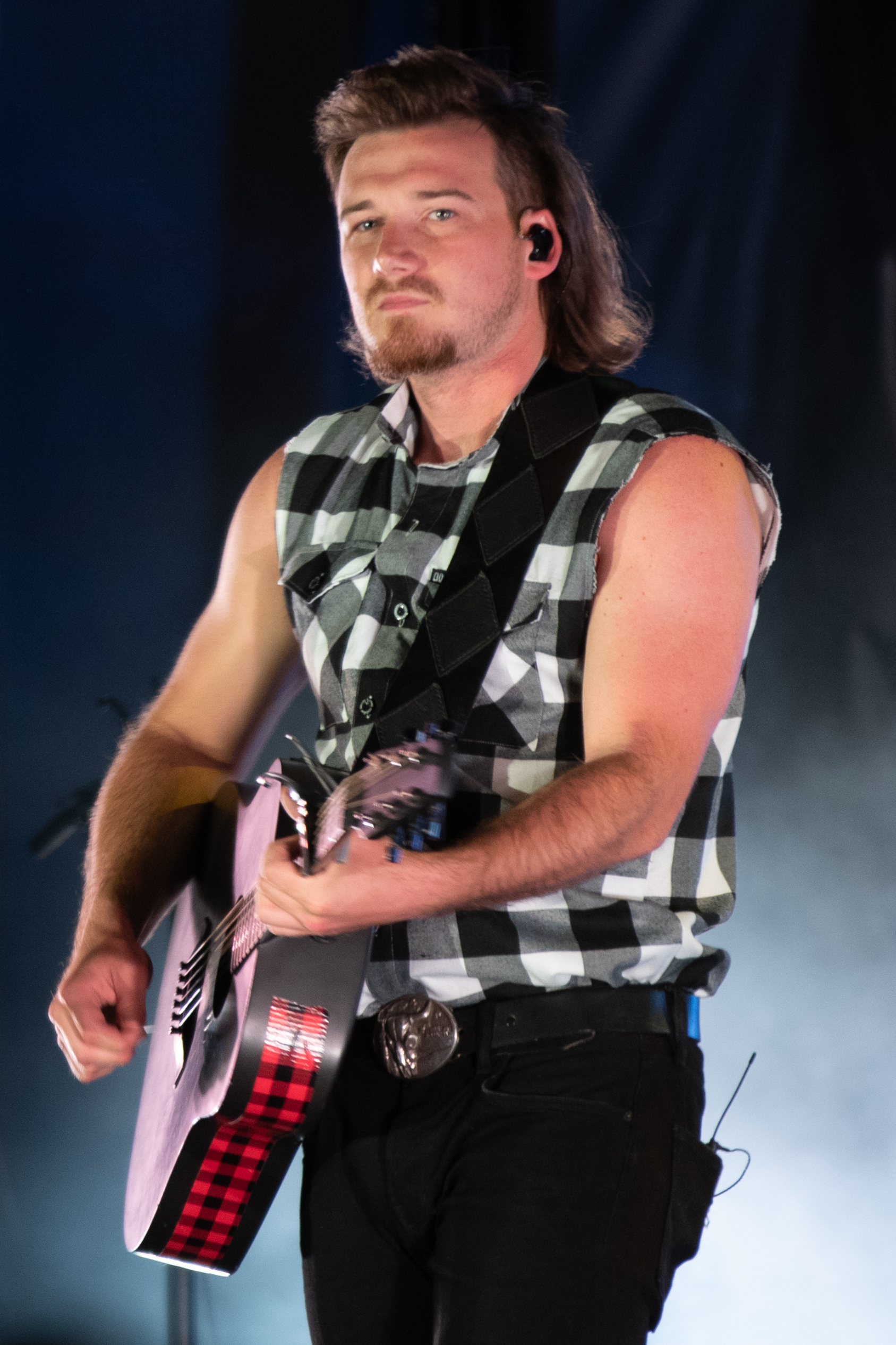
In May 2025, Morgan Wallen became the fifth country artist in UK chart history to debut at number-one with I'm the Problem.

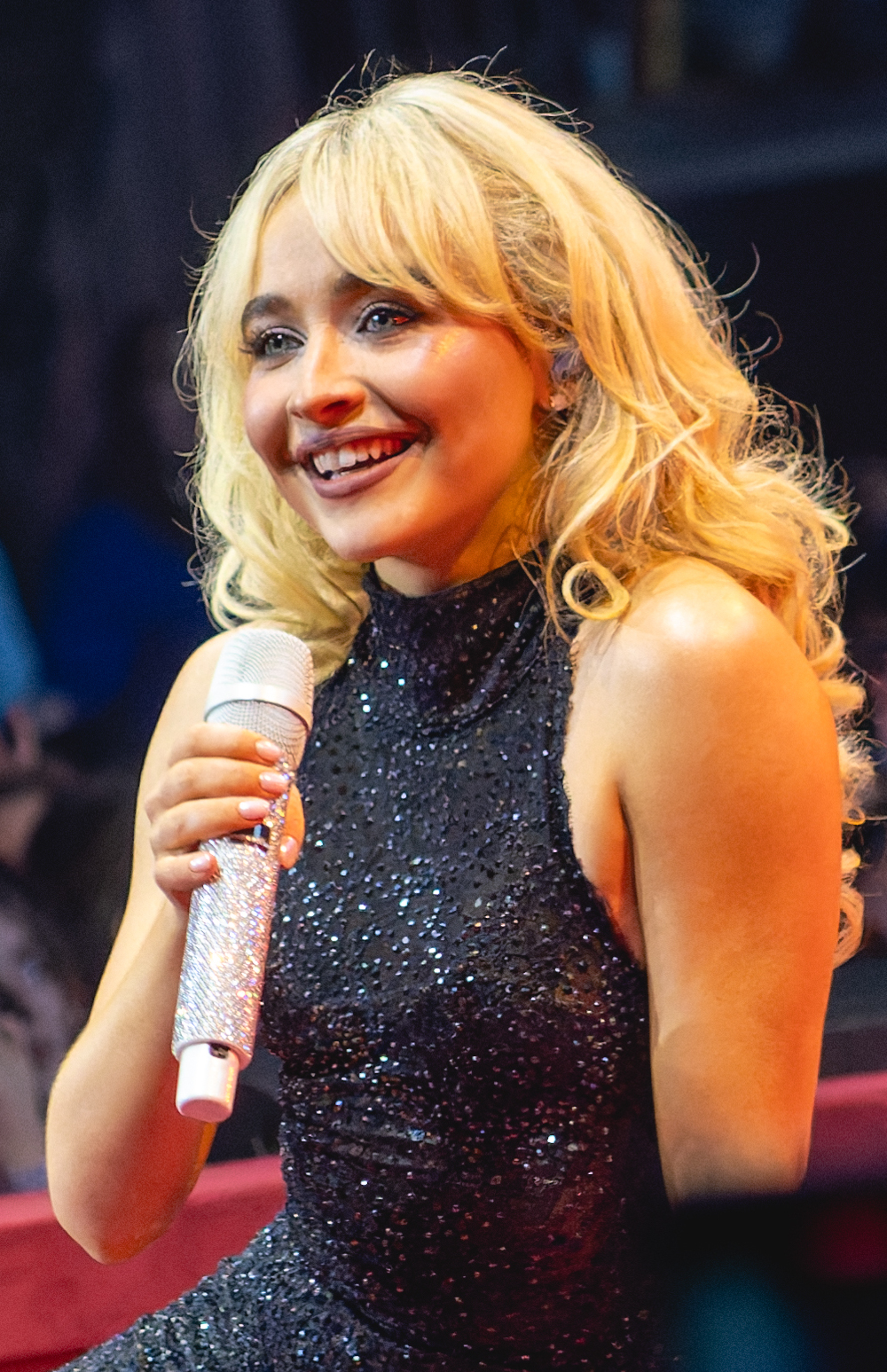
Sabrina Carpenter topped the UK Albums Chart for five non-consecutive weeks with Short n' Sweet. The album set a new record in June 2025 with the longest Top 5 streak in chart history. Carpenter went on to earn her second number one album in September 2025 with Man's Best Friend.

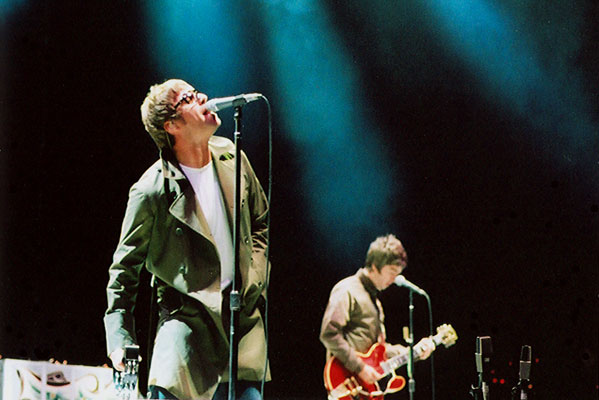
Oasis returned to number one numerous times throughout the 2020s with Definitely Maybe in September 2024 following the album's 30th anniversary, and Time Flies... 1994–2009 in July 2025.

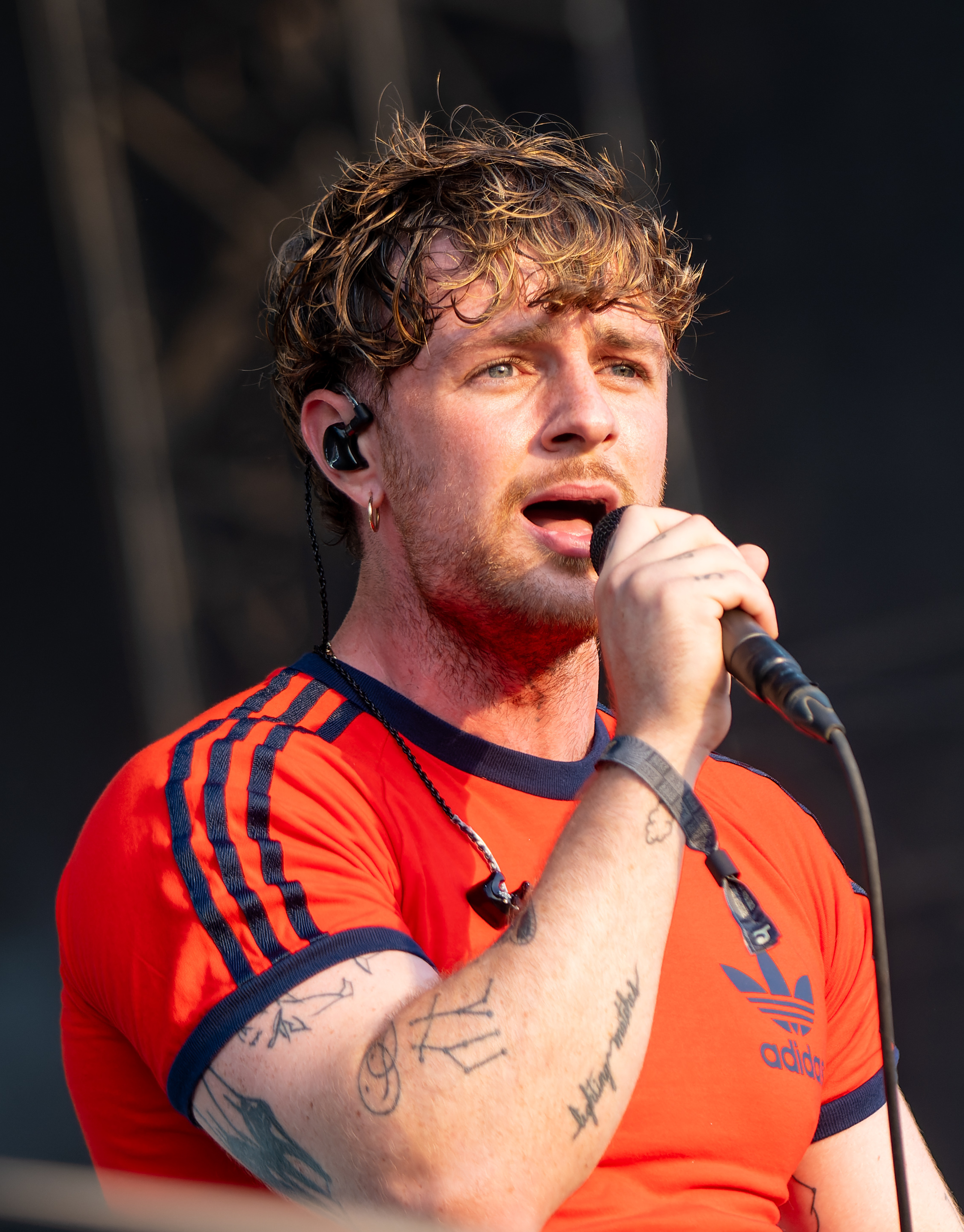
Tom Grennan earned three consecutive number-one albums throughout the 2020s with Evering Road, What Ifs & Maybes and Everywhere I Went, Led Me to Where I Didn't Want to Be.

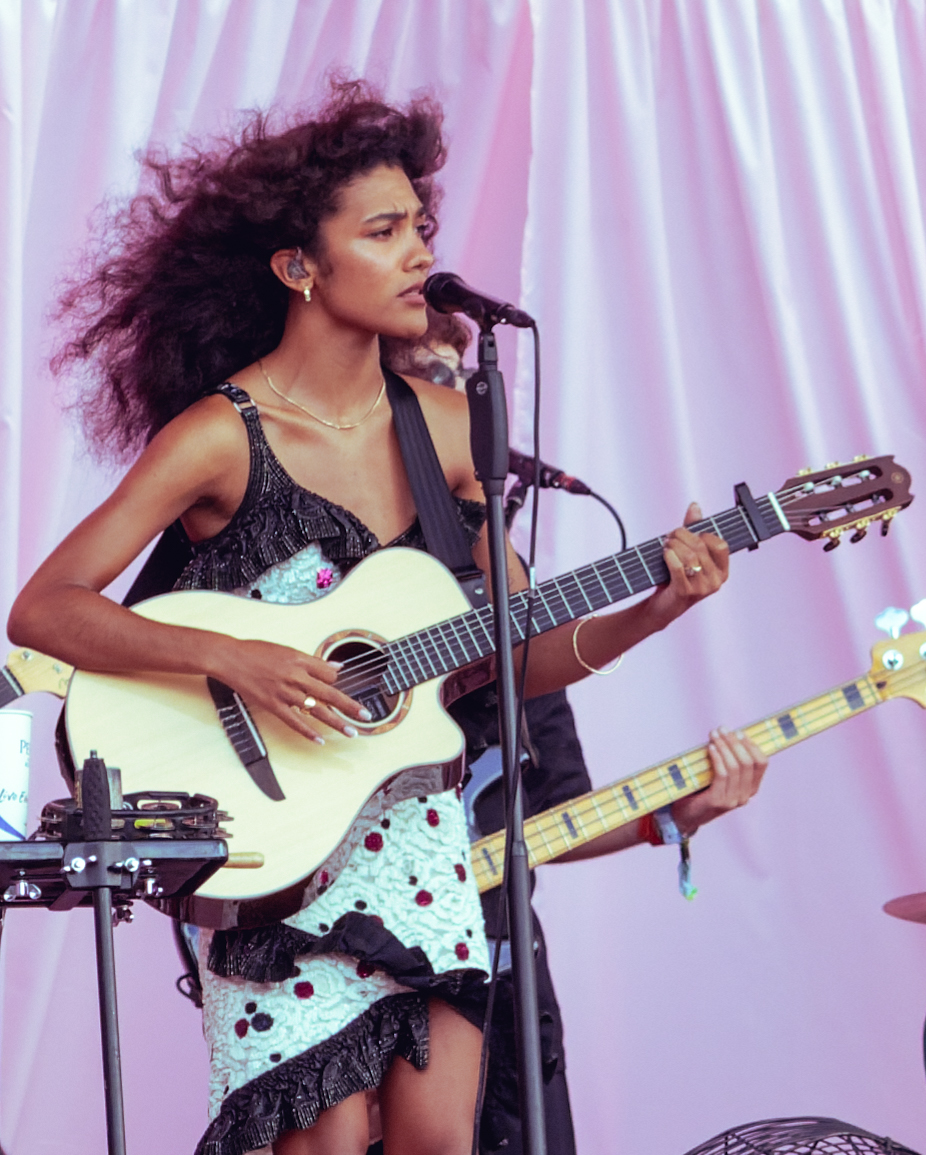
Olivia Dean became a prominent breakout star in the mid-2020s when she topped the UK Albums Chart for eight non-consecutive weeks with The Art of Loving, which has become the longest running number-one album this decade by a British artist, so far.

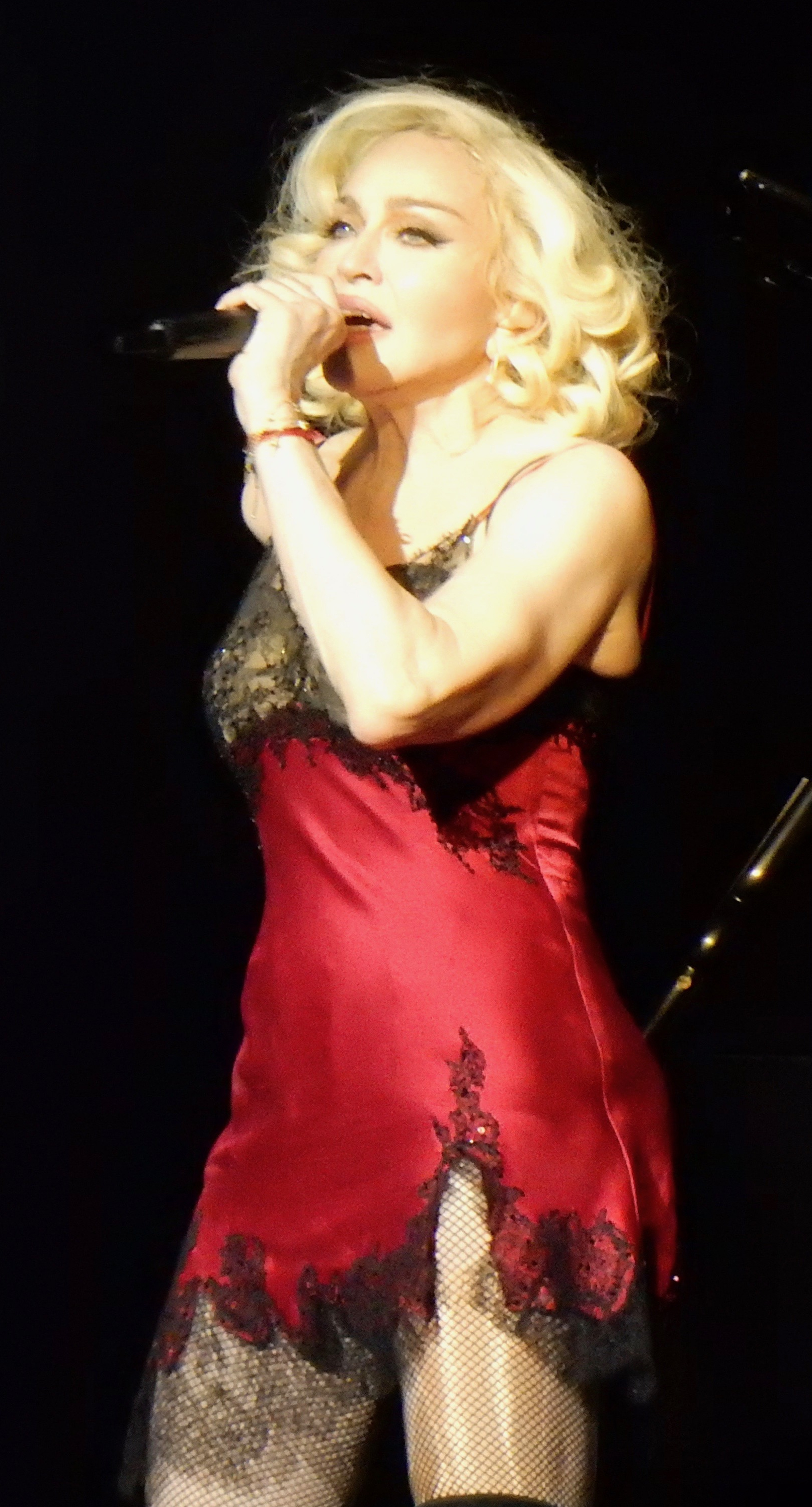
Madonna became the first American female artist to earn a number-one album across five decades in July 2026 when Confessions II became her first album to top the charts in 14 years.

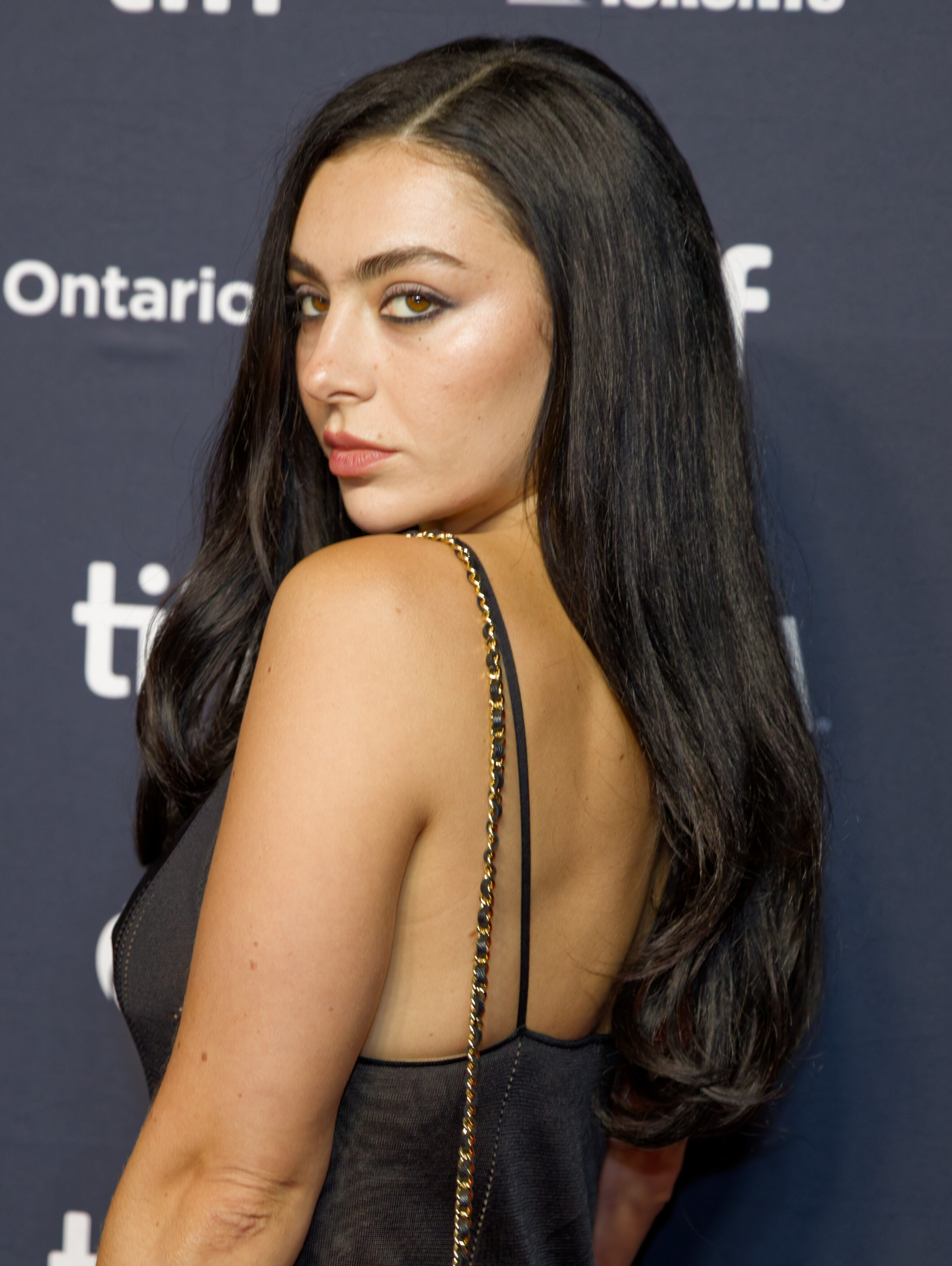
Charli XCX became the first British female solo artist to earn two number-one albums in the same year with Wuthering Heights and Music, Fashion, Film in 2026.

No.	Artist (Note: The artist, album, date of reaching number one and number of weeks at number one are those given by the Official Charts Company.)	Album	Record label (Note: The record labels are those given by the Official Charts Company.)	Reached number one	Weeks at number one	Certification (Note: The certifications are those given by the British Phonographic Industry.)
2020
re	Lewis Capaldi	Divinely Uninspired to a Hellish Extent †	EMI	3 January 2020	1	6× Platinum
1181	Stormzy	Heavy Is the Head	Atlantic/Merky	10 January 2020	1	Platinum
re	Lewis Capaldi	Divinely Uninspired to a Hellish Extent †	EMI	17 January 2020	1	6× Platinum
1182	Eminem	Music to Be Murdered By	Interscope	24 January 2020	1	Platinum
1183	J Hus	Big Conspiracy	Black Butter	31 January 2020	1	Gold
1184	Blossoms	Foolish Loving Spaces	EMI	7 February 2020	1	Silver
1185	Green Day	Father of All Motherfuckers	Reprise	14 February 2020	1	
1186	Justin Bieber	Changes	Def Jam	21 February 2020	1	Gold
1187	BTS	Map of the Soul: 7	Big Hit	28 February 2020	1	Gold
re	Lewis Capaldi	Divinely Uninspired to a Hellish Extent †	EMI	6 March 2020	1	6× Platinum
1188	Paul Heaton and Jacqui Abbott	Manchester Calling	EMI	13 March 2020	1	
1189	Niall Horan	Heartbreak Weather	Virgin EMI	20 March 2020	1	Gold
1190	The Weeknd	After Hours	Republic/XO	27 March 2020	1	Platinum
1191	5 Seconds of Summer	Calm	Interscope	3 April 2020	1	Gold
1192	Dua Lipa	Future Nostalgia	Warner	10 April 2020	2	3× Platinum
1193	Gerry Cinnamon	The Bonny	Little Runaway	24 April 2020	1	Platinum
re	Dua Lipa	Future Nostalgia	Warner	1 May 2020	1	3× Platinum
1194	Drake	Dark Lane Demo Tapes	Republic/OVO	8 May 2020	1	Gold
re	Dua Lipa	Future Nostalgia	Warner	15 May 2020	1	3× Platinum
re	Lewis Capaldi	Divinely Uninspired to a Hellish Extent †	EMI	22 May 2020	1	6× Platinum
1195	The 1975	Notes on a Conditional Form	Dirty Hit/Polydor	29 May 2020	1	Gold
1196	Lady Gaga	Chromatica	Streamline/Interscope	5 June 2020	2	Gold
1197	Liam Gallagher	MTV Unplugged (Live at Hull City Hall)	Warner	19 June 2020	1	Silver
1198	Bob Dylan	Rough and Rowdy Ways	Columbia	26 June 2020	1	Gold
1199	Haim	Women in Music Pt. III	Polydor	3 July 2020	1	Gold
1200	Paul Weller	On Sunset	Polydor	10 July 2020	1	
1201	Juice Wrld	Legends Never Die	Grade A/Interscope	17 July 2020	1	Platinum
1202	Ellie Goulding	Brightest Blue	Polydor	24 July 2020	1	Silver
1203	Taylor Swift	Folklore	Republic	31 July 2020	3	3× Platinum
1204	Biffy Clyro	A Celebration of Endings	Warner	21 August 2020	1	Silver
1205	The Killers	Imploding the Mirage	EMI	28 August 2020	1	Gold
1206	Nines	Crabs in a Bucket	Zino/Warner	4 September 2020	1	Gold
1207	The Rolling Stones	Goats Head Soup	Rolling Stones	11 September 2020	1	Gold^{[A]}
1208	Doves	The Universal Want	Virgin	18 September 2020	1	
1209	Pop Smoke	Shoot for the Stars, Aim for the Moon	Victor Victor/Republic	25 September 2020	1	2× Platinum
1210	Idles	Ultra Mono	Partisan	2 October 2020	1	Silver
1211	Queen + Adam Lambert	Live Around the World	EMI	9 October 2020	1	Silver
1212	Headie One	Edna	Relentless	16 October 2020	1	Gold
1213	The Vamps	Cherry Blossom	Virgin EMI/Universal	23 October 2020	1	
1214	Bruce Springsteen	Letter to You	Columbia	30 October 2020	1	Gold
1215	Ariana Grande	Positions	Republic	6 November 2020	1	Platinum
1216	Kylie Minogue	Disco	BMG	13 November 2020	1	Gold
1217	AC/DC	Power Up	Columbia	20 November 2020	1	Gold
1218	Michael Ball and Alfie Boe	Together at Christmas	Decca	27 November 2020	1	Gold
1219	Gary Barlow	Music Played by Humans	Polydor	4 December 2020	1	Gold
1220	Yungblud	Weird!	Interscope	11 December 2020	1	Gold
1221	Taylor Swift	Evermore	Republic	18 December 2020	1	2× Platinum
1222	Paul McCartney	McCartney III	Capitol	25 December 2020	1	
2021
re	Michael Bublé	Christmas	Reprise	1 January 2021	1	11× Platinum
re	Taylor Swift	Evermore	Republic	8 January 2021	1	2× Platinum
1223	Barry Gibb	Greenfields: The Gibb Brothers' Songbook, Vol. 1	EMI	15 January 2021	1	
1224	You Me at Six	Suckapunch	Underdog	22 January 2021	1	
1225	Bring Me the Horizon	Post Human: Survival Horror	RCA	29 January 2021	1	Gold
1226	Celeste	Not Your Muse	Polydor	5 February 2021	1	Gold
1227	Foo Fighters	Medicine at Midnight	Columbia	12 February 2021	1	Gold
1228	Slowthai	Tyron	Method	19 February 2021	1	Silver
1229	Mogwai	As the Love Continues	Rock Action	26 February 2021	1	
1230	Architects	For Those That Wish to Exist	Epitaph	5 March 2021	1	
1231	Kings of Leon	When You See Yourself	Columbia	12 March 2021	1	Silver
1232	Tom Grennan	Evering Road	Insanity	19 March 2021	1	Gold
1233	Lana Del Rey	Chemtrails over the Country Club	Polydor	26 March 2021	1	Gold
1234	Ben Howard	Collections from the Whiteout	Island	2 April 2021	1	
1235	The Snuts	W.L.	Parlophone	9 April 2021	1	Silver
1236	Taylor Swift	Fearless (Taylor's Version)	EMI	16 April 2021	1	Platinum
1237	London Grammar	Californian Soil	Ministry of Sound	23 April 2021	1	Gold
1238	Tom Jones	Surrounded by Time	EMI	30 April 2021	1	
1239	Royal Blood	Typhoons	Warner	7 May 2021	1	Silver
1240	Rag'n'Bone Man	Life by Misadventure	Columbia	14 May 2021	1	Gold
1241	Paul Weller	Fat Pop (Volume 1)	Polydor	21 May 2021	1	
1242	Olivia Rodrigo	Sour	Geffen	28 May 2021	2	4× Platinum
1243	Wolf Alice	Blue Weekend	Dirty Hit	11 June 2021	1	Gold
1244	Noel Gallagher's High Flying Birds	Back the Way We Came: Vol. 1 (2011–2021)	Sour Mash	18 June 2021	1	Gold
re	Olivia Rodrigo	Sour	Geffen	25 June 2021	1	4× Platinum
1245	Jack Savoretti	Europiana	EMI	2 July 2021	1	Silver
re	Olivia Rodrigo	Sour	Geffen	9 July 2021	1	3× Platinum
1246	Inhaler	It Won't Always Be Like This	Polydor	16 July 2021	1	Silver
1247	KSI	All Over the Place	BMG	23 July 2021	1	Gold
1248	Dave	We're All Alone in This Together	Neighbourhood	30 July 2021	1	Platinum
1249	Billie Eilish	Happier Than Ever	Interscope	6 August 2021	1	Platinum
re	Dave	We're All Alone in This Together	Neighbourhood	13 August 2021	1	Platinum
1250	The Killers	Pressure Machine	EMI	20 August 2021	1	
re	Olivia Rodrigo	Sour	Geffen	27 August 2021	1	4× Platinum
1251	Kanye West	Donda	Def Jam	3 September 2021	1	Gold
1252	Drake	Certified Lover Boy	Republic/OVO	10 September 2021	1	Platinum
1253	Manic Street Preachers	The Ultra Vivid Lament	Columbia	17 September 2021	1	
re	Drake	Certified Lover Boy	Republic/OVO	24 September 2021	1	Platinum
1254	The Lathums	How Beautiful Life Can Be	Island	1 October 2021	1	Silver
1255	The Script	Tales from the Script: Greatest Hits	Phonogenic/Sony	8 October 2021	1	Platinum
1256	Sam Fender	Seventeen Going Under	Polydor	15 October 2021	1	Platinum
1257	Coldplay	Music of the Spheres	Parlophone	22 October 2021	1	Gold
1258	Elton John	The Lockdown Sessions	EMI	29 October 2021	1	Gold
1259	Ed Sheeran	=	Atlantic	5 November 2021	1	4× Platinum
1260	ABBA	Voyage	Universal	12 November 2021	1	Platinum
1261	Taylor Swift	Red (Taylor's Version)	EMI	19 November 2021	1	Platinum
1262	Adele	30 †	Columbia	26 November 2021	5	3× Platinum
re	Ed Sheeran	=	Atlantic	31 December 2021	2	4× Platinum
2022
1263	The Weeknd	Dawn FM	Republic/XO	14 January 2022	1	Platinum
1264	The Wombats	Fix Yourself, Not the World	AWAL	21 January 2022	1	
1265	Years & Years	Night Call	Polydor	28 January 2022	1	Gold
1266	Don Broco	Amazing Things	SharpTone	4 February 2022	1	
1267	Bastille	Give Me the Future	EMI	11 February 2022	1	Silver
1268	Frank Turner	FTHC	Polydor	18 February 2022	1	
re	Ed Sheeran	=	Atlantic	25 February 2022	1	4× Platinum
1269	Central Cee	23	Self-released	4 March 2022	1	Gold
1270	Stereophonics	Oochya!	Stylus	11 March 2022	1	Silver
1271	Rex Orange County	Who Cares?	RCA	18 March 2022	1	
1272	Charli XCX	Crash	Atlantic	25 March 2022	1	Silver
1273	Michael Bublé	Higher	Reprise	1 April 2022	1	Silver
1274	Red Hot Chili Peppers	Unlimited Love	Warner	8 April 2022	1	Silver
1275	Wet Leg	Wet Leg	Domino	15 April 2022	1	Gold
1276	Digga D	Noughty by Nature	CGM/EGA	22 April 2022	1	Gold
1277	Fontaines D.C.	Skinty Fia	Partisan	29 April 2022	1	Gold
1278	Blossoms	Ribbon Around the Bomb	Virgin EMI	6 May 2022	1	
1279	Arcade Fire	We	Columbia	13 May 2022	1	Silver
1280	Florence and the Machine	Dance Fever	Polydor	20 May 2022	1	Gold
1281	Harry Styles	Harry's House †	Columbia	27 May 2022	1	3× Platinum
1282	Liam Gallagher	C'mon You Know	Warner	3 June 2022	1	Gold
re	Harry Styles	Harry's House †	Columbia	10 June 2022	1	3× Platinum
1283	George Ezra	Gold Rush Kid	Columbia	17 June 2022	1	Gold
re	Harry Styles	Harry's House †	Columbia	24 June 2022	2	3× Platinum
1284	Paolo Nutini	Last Night in the Bittersweet	Atlantic	8 July 2022	1	Gold
re	Harry Styles	Harry's House †	Columbia	15 July 2022	2	3× Platinum
1285	Jamie T	The Theory of Whatever	Polydor	29 July 2022	1	
1286	Beyoncé	Renaissance	Columbia/Parkwood	5 August 2022	2	Platinum
1287	Kasabian	The Alchemist's Euphoria	Sony	19 August 2022	1	
1288	Steps	Platinum Collection	Sony	26 August 2022	1	Silver
1289	Muse	Will of the People	Warner	2 September 2022	1	Gold
1290	Yungblud	Yungblud	Geffen	9 September 2022	1	Silver
1291	Robbie Williams	XXV	Columbia	16 September 2022	1	Silver
1292	Blackpink	Born Pink	Interscope	23 September 2022	1	Silver
1293	5 Seconds of Summer	5SOS5	BMG	30 September 2022	1	
1294	Slipknot	The End, So Far	Roadrunner	7 October 2022	1	
1295	Paul Heaton and Jacqui Abbott	N.K-Pop	EMI	14 October 2022	1	
1296	The 1975	Being Funny in a Foreign Language	Dirty Hit	21 October 2022	1	Gold
1297	Taylor Swift	Midnights	EMI	28 October 2022	2	3× Platinum
1298	Drake and 21 Savage	Her Loss	Republic/OVO	11 November 2022	1	Gold
1299	Louis Tomlinson	Faith in the Future	BMG	18 November 2022	1	Silver
1300	Dermot Kennedy	Sonder	Island	25 November 2022	1	Gold
1301	Stormzy	This Is What I Mean	Def Jam/Merky	2 December 2022	1	Silver
1302	Olly Murs	Marry Me	EMI	9 December 2022	1	
1303	Sam Ryder	There's Nothing but Space, Man!	Parlophone	16 December 2022	1	Gold
re	Taylor Swift	Midnights	EMI	23 December 2022	1	3× Platinum
re	Michael Bublé	Christmas	Reprise	30 December 2022	1	11× Platinum
2023
	The best performing album of 2023, The Highlights by The Weeknd peaked at number two on six separate occasions between 2021–2023. †					
re	Taylor Swift	Midnights	EMI	6 January 2023	2	3× Platinum
1304	Courteeners	St. Jude	Polydor	20 January 2023	1	Platinum
1305	The Reytons	What's Rock and Roll?	Self-released	27 January 2023	1	
1306	Sam Smith	Gloria	Capitol	3 February 2023	1	Silver
1307	Shania Twain	Queen of Me	EMI	10 February 2023	1	
1308	Paramore	This Is Why	Atlantic	17 February 2023	1	Silver
1309	Pink	Trustfall	RCA	24 February 2023	1	Gold
1310	Gorillaz	Cracker Island	Parlophone	3 March 2023	1	Silver
1311	The Lathums	From Nothing to a Little Bit More	Island	10 March 2023	1	
1312	Miley Cyrus	Endless Summer Vacation	Columbia	17 March 2023	1	Gold
1313	U2	Songs of Surrender	Island	24 March 2023	1	
1314	Lana Del Rey	Did You Know That There's a Tunnel Under Ocean Blvd	Polydor	31 March 2023	1	Gold
1315	Boygenius	The Record	Interscope	7 April 2023	1	Gold
1316	Ellie Goulding	Higher Than Heaven	Polydor	14 April 2023	1	
1317	Metallica	72 Seasons	Blackened Recordings	21 April 2023	1	Silver
1318	Enter Shikari	A Kiss for the Whole World	Ambush Reality	28 April 2023	1	
1319	The Lottery Winners	Anxiety Replacement Therapy	Modern Sky UK	5 May 2023	1	
1320	Ed Sheeran	-	Atlantic	12 May 2023	2	Gold
1321	Lewis Capaldi	Broken by Desire to Be Heavenly Sent	EMI	26 May 2023	2	Platinum
1322	Foo Fighters	But Here We Are	Columbia	9 June 2023	1	Silver
1323	Niall Horan	The Show	Capitol	16 June 2023	1	Silver
1324	Tom Grennan	What Ifs & Maybes	Insanity	23 June 2023	1	Gold
1325	Maisie Peters	The Good Witch	Gingerbread Man	30 June 2023	1	Silver
1326	Nothing but Thieves	Dead Club City	Sony	7 July 2023	1	Silver
1327	Taylor Swift	Speak Now (Taylor's Version)	EMI	14 July 2023	1	Platinum
1328	J Hus	Beautiful and Brutal Yard	Black Butter	21 July 2023	1	Gold
1329	Blur	The Ballad of Darren	Parlophone	28 July 2023	1	Silver
1330	Travis Scott	Utopia	Epic/Cactus Jack	4 August 2023	1	Platinum
1331	Cian Ducrot	Victory	Polydor	11 August 2023	1	
1332	Liam Gallagher	Knebworth 22	Warner	18 August 2023	1	
1333	Hozier	Unreal Unearth	Island	25 August 2023	1	Gold
1334	Burna Boy	I Told Them...	Atlantic	1 September 2023	1	Gold
1335	Royal Blood	Back to the Water Below	Warner	8 September 2023	1	
1336	Olivia Rodrigo	Guts	Geffen	15 September 2023	1	2× Platinum
1337	Busted	Greatest Hits 2.0	Self-released	22 September 2023	1	Silver
1338	Kylie Minogue	Tension	BMG	29 September 2023	1	Gold
1339	Ed Sheeran	Autumn Variations	Gingerbread Man	6 October 2023	1	Silver
1340	Drake	For All the Dogs	Republic/OVO	13 October 2023	1	Gold
1341	Ren	Sick Boi	The Other Songs	20 October 2023	1	Silver
1342	The Rolling Stones	Hackney Diamonds	Polydor	27 October 2023	1	Gold
1343	Taylor Swift	1989 (Taylor's Version)	EMI	3 November 2023	3	2× Platinum
1344	Madness	Theatre of the Absurd Presents C'est la Vie	BMG	24 November 2023	1	
1345	Take That	This Life	EMI	1 December 2023	1	Gold
1346	Peter Gabriel	I/O	EMI	8 December 2023	1	
1347	The Killers	Rebel Diamonds	EMI	15 December 2023	1	Platinum
re	The Rolling Stones	Hackney Diamonds	Polydor	22 December 2023	1	Gold
re	Michael Bublé	Christmas	Reprise	29 December 2023	1	11× Platinum
2024
re	Lewis Capaldi	Broken by Desire to Be Heavenly Sent	EMI	5 January 2024	1	Platinum
1348	Shed Seven	A Matter of Time	Cooking Vinyl	12 January 2024	1	
1349	D-Block Europe	Rolling Stone	UMG	19 January 2024	1	Gold
1350	Green Day	Saviors	Reprise	26 January 2024	1	Silver
1351	James Arthur	Bitter Sweet Love	Columbia	2 February 2024	1	Silver
1352	The Last Dinner Party	Prelude to Ecstasy	Island	9 February 2024	1	Gold
1353	Noah Kahan	Stick Season	Republic	16 February 2024	1	3× Platinum
1354	Idles	Tangk	Partisan	23 February 2024	1	
1355	Rod Stewart and Jools Holland	Swing Fever	Warner	1 March 2024	1	Silver
1356	Liam Gallagher and John Squire	Liam Gallagher John Squire	Warner	8 March 2024	1	Silver
1357	Ariana Grande	Eternal Sunshine	Republic	15 March 2024	2	Platinum
1358	Elbow	Audio Vertigo	Polydor	29 March 2024	1	
1359	Beyoncé	Cowboy Carter	Columbia/Parkwood	5 April 2024	1	Gold
1360	The Libertines	All Quiet on the Eastern Esplanade	EMI	12 April 2024	1	
1361	James	Yummy	Nothing But Love	19 April 2024	1	
1362	Taylor Swift	The Tortured Poets Department †	EMI	26 April 2024	2	3× Platinum
1363	Dua Lipa	Radical Optimism	Warner	10 May 2024	1	Gold
re	Taylor Swift	The Tortured Poets Department †	EMI	17 May 2024	1	3× Platinum
1364	Billie Eilish	Hit Me Hard and Soft	Interscope	24 May 2024	1	2× Platinum
re	Taylor Swift	The Tortured Poets Department †	EMI	31 May 2024	4	3× Platinum
1365	Gracie Abrams	The Secret of Us	Interscope	28 June 2024	1	Platinum
re	Taylor Swift	The Tortured Poets Department †	EMI	5 July 2024	1	3× Platinum
1366	Kasabian	Happenings	Columbia	12 July 2024	1	
1367	Eminem	The Death of Slim Shady (Coup de Grâce)	Interscope	19 July 2024	3	Gold
1368	Chappell Roan	The Rise and Fall of a Midwest Princess	Island	9 August 2024	1	2× Platinum
1369	Beabadoobee	This Is How Tomorrow Moves	Dirty Hit	16 August 2024	1	Silver
1370	Post Malone	F-1 Trillion	Republic	23 August 2024	1	Gold
1371	Sabrina Carpenter	Short n' Sweet	Island	30 August 2024	1	3× Platinum
re	Oasis	Definitely Maybe	Creation	6 September 2024	1	10× Platinum
1372	David Gilmour	Luck and Strange	Sony Music	13 September 2024	1	Silver
1373	Snow Patrol	The Forest Is the Path	Polydor	20 September 2024	1	Silver
1374	Blossoms	Gary	ODD SK Recordings	27 September 2024	1	
1375	Shed Seven	Liquid Gold	Cooking Vinyl	4 October 2024	1	
1376	Coldplay	Moon Music	Parlophone	11 October 2024	1	Platinum
1377	Charli XCX	Brat	Atlantic	18 October 2024	1	2× Platinum
1378	Kylie Minogue	Tension II	BMG	25 October 2024	1	Silver
1379	Tyler, the Creator	Chromakopia	Columbia	1 November 2024	1	Gold
1380	The Cure	Songs of a Lost World	Polydor	8 November 2024	1	Gold
1381	Michael Ball and Alfie Boe	Together at Home	Tag8 Music	15 November 2024	1	
1382	Linkin Park	From Zero	Warner	22 November 2024	1	Gold
1383	Kendrick Lamar	GNX	Interscope	29 November 2024	1	Gold
re	Taylor Swift	The Tortured Poets Department †	EMI	6 December 2024	2	3× Platinum
re	Sabrina Carpenter	Short n' Sweet	Island	20 December 2024	1	3× Platinum
re	Michael Bublé	Christmas	Reprise	27 December 2024	1	11× Platinum
2025
1384	Ed Sheeran	+–=÷× (Tour Collection)	Asylum	3 January 2025	1	2× Platinum
1385	Elton John	Diamonds	Mercury	10 January 2025	1	7× Platinum
re	Chappell Roan	The Rise and Fall of a Midwest Princess	Island	17 January 2025	1	2× Platinum
1386	Robbie Williams	Better Man	Columbia	24 January 2025	1	
1387	Central Cee	Can't Rush Greatness	Columbia	31 January 2025	1	Gold
1388	The Weeknd	Hurry Up Tomorrow	Republic/XO	7 February 2025	1	Gold
1389	Taylor Swift	Lover (Live from Paris)	EMI	14 February 2025	1	
re	Sabrina Carpenter	Short n' Sweet	Island	21 February 2025	1	3× Platinum
1390	Sam Fender	People Watching	Polydor	28 February 2025	1	Platinum
re	Sabrina Carpenter	Short n' Sweet	Island	7 March 2025	1	3× Platinum
1391	Lady Gaga	Mayhem	Polydor	14 March 2025	1	Gold
1392	Playboi Carti	Music	Interscope	21 March 2025	1	Gold
1393	The Lottery Winners	KOKO	Modern Sky	28 March 2025	1	
1394	Mumford & Sons	Rushmere	Gentlemen of the Road/Island	4 April 2025	1	Silver
1395	Elton John and Brandi Carlile	Who Believes in Angels?	EMI	11 April 2025	1	
1396	Those Damn Crows	God Shaped Hole	Earache	18 April 2025	1	
re	Taylor Swift	The Tortured Poets Department	EMI	25 April 2025	1	3× Platinum
1397	Stereophonics	Make 'Em Laugh, Make 'Em Cry, Make 'Em Wait	EMI	2 May 2025	1	
1398	Pink Floyd	Pink Floyd at Pompeii - MCMLXXII	Sony	9 May 2025	1	
1399	Sleep Token	Even in Arcadia	RCA	16 May 2025	1	Gold
1400	Morgan Wallen	I'm the Problem	EMI	23 May 2025	1	Gold
re	Sabrina Carpenter	Short n' Sweet	Island	30 May 2025	1	3× Platinum
re	Ed Sheeran	+–=÷× (Tour Collection)	Asylum	6 June 2025	1	2× Platinum
1401	Pulp	More	Rough Trade	13 June 2025	1	Silver
1402	James Marriott	Don't Tell the Dog	AWAL/Marriott Music	20 June 2025	1	
1403	Yungblud	Idols	Island	27 June 2025	1	Silver
1404	Lorde	Virgin	EMI	4 July 2025	1	Silver
re	Oasis	Time Flies... 1994–2009	Big Brother	11 July 2025	1	8× Platinum
1405	Wet Leg	Moisturizer	Domino	18 July 2025	1	Silver
1406	Alex Warren	You'll Be Alright, Kid	Atlantic	25 July 2025	1	Platinum
1407	The K's	Pretty on the Internet	LAB	1 August 2025	1	
1408	Reneé Rapp	Bite Me	Interscope	8 August 2025	1	Silver
re	Oasis	Time Flies... 1994–2009	Big Brother	15 August 2025	1	8× Platinum
1409	Tom Grennan	Everywhere I Went, Led Me to Where I Didn't Want to Be	Insanity	22 August 2025	1	
1410	Wolf Alice	The Clearing	Columbia	29 August 2025	1	Silver
1411	Sabrina Carpenter	Man's Best Friend	Island	5 September 2025	2	Platinum
1412	Ed Sheeran	Play	Asylum	19 September 2025	1	Gold
1413	Biffy Clyro	Futique	Warner	26 September 2025	1	
1414	Olivia Dean	The Art of Loving	Capitol	3 October 2025	1	2× Platinum
1415	Taylor Swift	The Life of a Showgirl †	EMI	10 October 2025	3	2× Platinum
1416	Dave	The Boy Who Played the Harp	Neighbourhood	31 October 2025	1	Gold
1417	Florence and the Machine	Everybody Scream	Polydor	7 November 2025	1	Silver
re	Taylor Swift	The Life of a Showgirl †	EMI	14 November 2025	1	2x Platinum
1418	5 Seconds of Summer	Everyone's a Star!	BMG	21 November 2025	1	
1419	Aerosmith and Yungblud	One More Time	Island	28 November 2025	1	
re	Olivia Dean	The Art of Loving	Capitol	5 December 2025	1	2× Platinum
1420	Kylie Minogue	Kylie Christmas	Parlophone	12 December 2025	1	
re	Pink Floyd	Wish You Were Here	Harvest	19 December 2025	1	3× Platinum
re	Michael Bublé	Christmas	Reprise	26 December 2025	1	11× Platinum
2026
re	Olivia Dean	The Art of Loving	Capitol	2 January 2026	3	2× Platinum
1421	Robbie Williams	Britpop	Columbia	23 January 2026	1	
1422	Louis Tomlinson	How Did I Get Here?	BMG	30 January 2026	1	
re	Olivia Dean	The Art of Loving	Capitol	6 February 2026	2	2× Platinum
1423	Charli XCX	Wuthering Heights	Atlantic	20 February 2026	1	
1424	Mumford & Sons	Prizefighter	Island	27 February 2026	1	Silver
1425	Gorillaz	The Mountain	Kong	6 March 2026	1	
1426	Harry Styles	Kiss All the Time. Disco, Occasionally.	Columbia	13 March 2026	2	Platinum
1427	BTS	Arirang	Big Hit	27 March 2026	1	Gold
1428	Raye	This Music May Contain Hope	Human Re Sources	3 April 2026	1	Gold
1429	Dermot Kennedy	The Weight of the Woods	Island	10 April 2026	1	
re	Olivia Dean	The Art of Loving	Capitol	17 April 2026	1	2× Platinum
1430	Skindred	You Got This	Earache	24 April 2026	1	
1431	Noah Kahan	The Great Divide	Mercury	1 May 2026	1	Gold
re	Michael Jackson	The Essential Michael Jackson	Epic	8 May 2026	2	8× Platinum
1432	Drake	Iceman	OVO/Republic	22 May 2026	1	Gold
1433	Maisie Peters	Florescence	Atlantic/Gingerbread Man	29 May 2026	1	
1434	Paul McCartney	The Boys of Dungeon Lane	Capitol	5 June 2026	1	
1435	Niall Horan	Dinner Party	EMI	12 June 2026	1	
1436	Olivia Rodrigo	You Seem Pretty Sad for a Girl So in Love	Geffen	19 June 2026	2	Platinum
1437	Muse	The Wow! Signal	Warner	3 July 2026	1	
1438	Madonna	Confessions II	Warner	10 July 2026	1	Silver
1439	The Rolling Stones	Foreign Tongues	Polydor	17 July 2026	1	Silver
1440	Gracie Abrams	Daughter from Hell	Interscope	24 July 2026	1	Silver
1441	Charli XCX	Music, Fashion, Film	Atlantic	31 July 2026	1	
1442	Ariana Grande	Petal	Republic	7 August 2026	1	Gold
1443	The Reytons	A Love Letter To a Broken Town	The Reytons	14 August 2026	1	
1444	Phoebe Bridgers	Lost Weekend	Dead Oceans	21 August 2026	1	Silver
1445	Paul Heaton	Jenius	EMI	28 August 2026	1	
1446	Alex Warren	Wildchild	Atlantic	4 September 2026	1	
1447	Kasabian	Act III	Sony	11 September 2026	1	
1448	Ezra Collective	Here Because of Hope	Partisan	18 September 2026	1	
1449	Beabadoobee	Pylon	Dirty Hit	25 September 2026	1	
re	Taylor Swift	The Life of a Showgirl	EMI	2 October 2026	1	2x Platinum
1450	Blossoms	Songs from the Wedding Cake	Distiller	9 October 2026	1	
1451	Jamie T	Ghosts (100 Days of Morning)	Polydor	16 October 2026	1	
1452	Fontaines D.C.	Dopamine Chamber	XL Recordings	23 October 2026	1	Gold
1453	My Chemical Romance	The Black Parade	Warner	30 October 2026	1	4x Platinum
1454	Queens of the Stone Age	Perfecth	Matador	6 November 2026	1	
1455	James Blunt	Airplane Mode	Atlantic	13 November 2026	1	

=== Artists with the most number ones in the 2020s ===
Artist	Number ones	Albums
Taylor Swift	10	List: 1. Folklore (2020); 2. Evermore (2020); 3. Fearless (Taylor's Version) (2021); 4. Red (Taylor's Version) (2021); 5. Midnights (2022); 6. Speak Now (Taylor's Version) (2023); 7. 1989 (Taylor's Version) (2023); 8. The Tortured Poets Department (2024); 9. Lover (Live from Paris) (2025); 10. The Life of a Showgirl (2025)
Ed Sheeran	5	List: 1. = (2021); 2. - (2023); 3. Autumn Variations (2023); 4. +–=÷× (Tour Collection) (2025); 5. Play (2025)
Drake	5	List: 1. Dark Lane Demo Tapes (2020); 2. Certified Lover Boy (2021); 3. Her Loss (2022); 4. For All the Dogs (2023); 5. Iceman (2026)
Liam Gallagher	4	List: 1. MTV Unplugged (Live at Hull City Hall) (2020); 2. C'mon You Know (2022); 3. Knebworth 22 (2023); 4. Liam Gallagher John Squire (2024)
Yungblud	4	List: 1. Weird! (2020); 2. Yungblud (2022); 3. Idols (2025); 4. One More Time (2025)
Kylie Minogue	4	List: 1. Disco (2020); 2. Tension (2023); 3. Tension II (2024); 4. Kylie Christmas (2025)
Charli XCX	4	List: 1. Crash (2022); 2. Brat (2024); 3. Wuthering Heights (2026); 4. Music, Fashion, Film (2026)
Blossoms	4	List: 1. Foolish Loving Spaces (2020); 2. Ribbon Around the Bomb (2022); 3. Gary (2024); 4. Songs from the Wedding Cake (2026)
The Killers	3	List: 1. Imploding the Mirage (2020); 2. Pressure Machine (2021); 3. Rebel Diamonds (2023)
The Weeknd	3	List: 1. After Hours (2020); 2. Dawn FM (2022); 3. Hurry Up Tomorrow (2025)
Elton John	3	List: 1. The Lockdown Sessions (2021); 2. Diamonds (2025); 3. Who Believes in Angels? (2025)
Tom Grennan	3	List: 1. Evering Road (2021); 2. What Ifs & Maybes (2023); 3. Everywhere I Went, Led Me to Where I Didn't Want to Be (2025)
5 Seconds of Summer	3	List: 1. Calm (2020); 2. 5SOS5 (2022); 3. Everyone's a Star! (2025)
Robbie Williams	3	List: 1. XXV (2022); 2. Better Man (2025); 3. Britpop (2026)
Niall Horan	3	List: 1. Heartbreak Weather (2020); 2. The Show (2023); 3. Dinner Party (2026)
Olivia Rodrigo	3	List: 1. Sour (2021); 2. Guts (2023); 3. You Seem Pretty Sad for a Girl So in Love (2026)
The Rolling Stones	3	List: 1. Goats Head Soup (2020) †; 2. Hackney Diamonds (2023); 3. Foreign Tongues (2026)
Ariana Grande	3	List: 1. Positions (2020); 2. Eternal Sunshine (2024); 3. Petal (2026)
Paul Heaton	3	List: 1. Manchester Calling (2020); 2. N.K-Pop (2022); 3. Jenius (2026)
Kasabian	3	List: 1. The Alchemist's Euphoria (2022); 2. Happenings (2024); 3. Act III (2026)

- † Originally reached number one in the 1970s, but went to number one again during the 2020s.

=== Albums with the most weeks at number one ===
The following albums spent at least three weeks at number one during the 2020s.

Artist	Album	Weeks at number one
Taylor Swift	The Tortured Poets Department	11
Olivia Dean	The Art of Loving	8
Harry Styles	Harry's House	6
Taylor Swift	Midnights	5
Taylor Swift	The Life of a Showgirl	5
Adele	30	5
Michael Bublé	Christmas	5
Sabrina Carpenter	Short n' Sweet	5
Olivia Rodrigo	Sour	5
Dua Lipa	Future Nostalgia	4
Lewis Capaldi	Divinely Uninspired to a Hellish Extent	4
Ed Sheeran	=	4
Taylor Swift	Folklore	3
Taylor Swift	1989 (Taylor's Version)	3
Lewis Capaldi	Broken by Desire to Be Heavenly Sent	3
Eminem	The Death of Slim Shady (Coup de Grâce)	3

=== Artists with the most weeks at number one ===
Twenty-seven different artists have spent three weeks or more at number one on the album chart so far during the 2020s. Taylor Swift has spent the most weeks at number one, with a total of 32 weeks.

Artist	Weeks at number one	Albums
Taylor Swift	33	Folklore (3); Evermore (2); Fearless (Taylor's Version) (1); Red (Taylor's Version) (1); Midnights (5); Speak Now (Taylor's Version) (1); 1989 (Taylor's Version) (3); The Tortured Poets Department (11); Lover (Live from Paris) (1); The Life of a Showgirl (5)
Ed Sheeran	10	= (4); - (2); Autumn Variations (1); +–=÷× (Tour Collection) (2); Play (1)
Harry Styles	8	Harry's House (6); Kiss All the Time. Disco, Occasionally (2)
Olivia Dean	8	The Art of Loving (8)
Olivia Rodrigo	8	Sour (5); Guts (1); You Seem Pretty Sad for a Girl So in Love (2)
Lewis Capaldi	7	Divinely Uninspired to a Hellish Extent (4); Broken by Desire to Be Heavenly Sent (3)
Sabrina Carpenter	7	Short n' Sweet (5); Man's Best Friend (2)
Michael Bublé	6	Christmas (5); Higher (1)
Drake	6	Dark Lane Demo Tapes (1); Certified Lover Boy (2); Her Loss (1); For All the Dogs (1); Iceman (1)
Adele	5	30 (5)
Dua Lipa	5	Future Nostalgia (4); Radical Optimism (1)
Liam Gallagher	4	MTV Unplugged (Live at Hull City Hall) (1); C'mon You Know (1); Knebworth 22 (1); Liam Gallagher John Squire (1)
Eminem	4	Music to Be Murdered By (1); The Death of Slim Shady (Coup de Grâce) (3)
Kylie Minogue	4	Disco (1); Tension (1); Tension II (1); Kylie Christmas (1)
The Rolling Stones	4	Goats Head Soup (1); Hackney Diamonds (2); Foreign Tongues (1)
Charli XCX	4	Crash (1); Brat (1); Wuthering Heights (1); Music, Fashion, Film (1)
Ariana Grande	4	Positions (1); Eternal Sunshine (2); Petal (1)
Blossoms	4	Foolish Loving Spaces (1); Ribbon Around the Bomb (1); Gary (1); Songs from the Wedding Cake (1)
The Killers	3	Imploding the Mirage (1); Pressure Machine (1); Rebel Diamonds (1)
Beyoncé	3	Renaissance (2); Cowboy Carter (1)
The Weeknd	3	After Hours (1); Dawn FM (1); Hurry Up Tomorrow (1)
Lady Gaga	3	Chromatica (2); Mayhem (1)
Elton John	3	The Lockdown Sessions (1); Diamonds (1); Who Believes in Angels? (1)
Yungblud	3	Weird! (1); Yungblud (1); Idols (1)
Oasis	3	Definitely Maybe (1); Time Flies... 1994-2009 (2)
5 Seconds of Summer	3	Calm (1); 5SOS5 (1); Everyone's a Star! (1)
Robbie Williams	3	XXV (1); Better Man (1); Britpop (1)
Niall Horan	3	Heartbreak Weather (1); The Show (1); Dinner Party (1)
Paul Heaton	3	Manchester Calling (1); N.K-Pop (1); Jenius (1)

=== By record label ===
Fourteen different record labels have spent five weeks or more at number one on the album chart so far during the 2020s.

Record label	Number-one albums	Weeks at number-one
EMI	33	56
Columbia	26	37
Republic	16	29
Polydor	25	25
Warner	17	21
Island	13	19
Interscope	15	17
Atlantic	14	16
Capitol	3	11
BMG	9	9
Geffen	3	8
Parlophone	7	7
Reprise	4	7
OVO	5	6

== Fastest-selling number ones ==
The number-one albums below have sold over 100,000 units in a week. Taylor Swift, Coldplay and Harry Styles are the only acts to achieve this with multiple releases, while Adele's 30 (2021) is the only record with multiple weeks. The Car by Arctic Monkeys debuted at number two with 119,016 units sold in 2022, blocked by Swift's Midnights.

Year	Artist	Album	Record label	Units sold	Ref.
2021	Coldplay	Music of the Spheres	Parlophone	101,045	
2021	Ed Sheeran	=	Atlantic	139,107	
2021	ABBA	Voyage	Universal	203,909	
2021	Adele	30	Columbia	261,856	
2021	Adele	30	Columbia	102,261	
2022	Harry Styles	Harry's House	Columbia	113,812	
2022	Taylor Swift	Midnights	EMI	204,501	
2022	Take That	This Life	EMI	116,163	
2023	Taylor Swift	1989 (Taylor's Version)	EMI	184,965	
2024	Taylor Swift	The Tortured Poets Department	EMI	270,091	
2024	Coldplay	Moon Music	Parlophone	236,796	
2025	Sam Fender	People Watching	Polydor	107,124	
2025	Taylor Swift	The Life of a Showgirl	EMI	423,444	
2026	Harry Styles	Kiss All the Time. Disco, Occasionally	Columbia	183,045	
2026	Olivia Rodrigo	You Seem Pretty Sad for a Girl So in Love	Geffen	102,814	

== Christmas number ones ==
In the UK, Christmas number-one albums are those that are at the top of the UK Albums Chart on Christmas Day. Typically, this will refer to the album that was announced as number-one on the Friday before 25 December—when Christmas Day falls on a Friday itself, the official number-one is considered by the OCC to be the one announced on that day's chart. During the 2020s, the following albums were Christmas number ones.

Year	Artist	Album	Record label	Weeks at number one	Ref.
2020	Paul McCartney	McCartney III	Capitol	1	
2021	Adele	30	Columbia	5	
2022	Taylor Swift	Midnights	EMI	5	
2023	The Rolling Stones	Hackney Diamonds	Polydor	2	
2024	Sabrina Carpenter	Short n' Sweet	Island	5	
2025	Pink Floyd	Wish You Were Here	EMI	1	

== See also ==
- List of UK Singles Chart number ones of the 2020s

== Notes ==
- A Certification achieved in 1973.
