= KOKO (album) =

Studio album by The Lottery Winners
- Released: 21 March 2025
- Genre: Indie pop
- Length: 39:42
- Label: Modern Sky
- Producer: Thom Rylance; Tristan Ivemy

The Lottery Winners chronology
| Anxiety Replacement Therapy (2023) | KOKO (2025) |

Singles from KOKO
- 1. "You Again" Released: 23 September 2024; 2. "Superpower" Released: 24 October 2024; 3. "UFO" Released: 21 November 2024; 4. "Dirt and Gold" Released: 17 January 2024; 5. "Turn Around" Released: 12 February 2025; 6. "Ragdoll" Released: 19 March 2025

KOKO (initialism for Keep On Keeping On) is the fourth studio album by English indie pop band The Lottery Winners. The album was released on 21 March 2025 through Modern Sky, and peaked at number one on the UK Albums Chart, becoming the band's second album to do so.

The album features collaborations with artists such as Reverend and the Makers, Chad Kroeger from Nickelback, Frank Turner and Shed Seven.

== Track listing ==
All tracks are written by Thom Rylance, except where noted.

| No. | Title | Writer(s) | Length |
|---|---|---|---|
| 1. | "Superpower" | | 3:16 |
| 2. | "You Again" (feat. Reverend and the Makers) | Rylance; Jon McClure; Danny LaFrombé | 3:43 |
| 3. | "Panic Attack" | | 2:53 |
| 4. | "UFO" | Rylance; Dan Fable | 3:36 |
| 5. | "Ragdoll" (feat. Chad Kroeger) | Rylance; Katie Lloyd; Chad Kroeger | 3:37 |
| 6. | "Struggling" | | 3:44 |
| 7. | "Turn Around" | | 2:53 |
| 8. | "Monaco" | | 2:38 |
| 9. | "Three Wishes" | | 3:08 |
| 10. | "Dirt and Gold" (feat. Frank Turner) | | 3:40 |
| 11. | "The Ceiling" (feat. Shed Seven) | | 3:42 |
| 12. | "Keep On Keeping On" | | 2:46 |
| Total length: | | | 39:42 |

== Charts ==
Chart performance
| Chart (2025) | Peak position |
|---|---|
| Scottish Albums (OCC) | 2 |
| UK Albums (OCC) | 3 |
| UK Independent Albums (OCC) | 1 |
