= The Lottery Winners =

British indie band

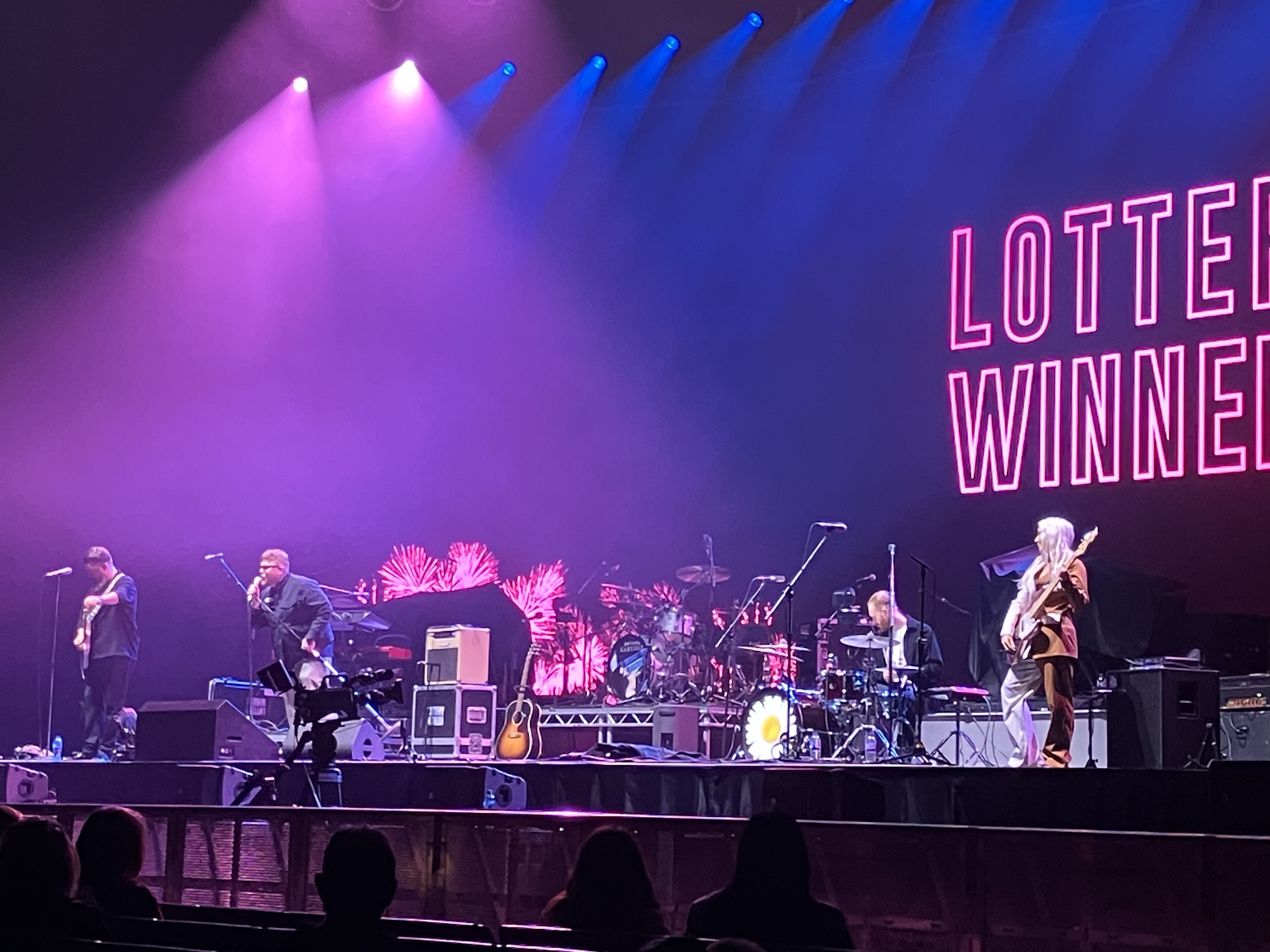
- The band performing at the OVO Hydro in February 2024. Left to Right: Lally, Rylance, Singleton, Lloyd

Background information
- Origin: Leigh, Greater Manchester, England
- Genre: Indie pop
- Years active: 2008–present
- Label: Modern Sky UK
- Members: Thom Rylance; Robert Lally; Katie Lloyd; Joe Singleton
- Past members: Alexandria Langford-Taylor
- Website: Thelotterywinners.co.uk

The Lottery Winners are an indie pop band from Leigh, Greater Manchester, England. The band was formed in 2008, and currently consists of Thom Rylance, Robert Lally, Katie Lloyd, and Joe Singleton. Touring the pubs and clubs circuit for many years, the band received their mainstream breakthrough in 2019, when they signed to Modern Sky UK. They have released four studio albums, two of which have peaked at number one on the UK Albums Chart.

== History ==
The band formed in 2008, and originally consisted of Rylance, Lally, Lloyd and original drummer, Alexandria Langford-Taylor. They began honing their craft by gigging around the pubs and clubs of Leigh. In 2010, the group released their first album, The Art of Communication, which includes Emerald City, the first track that Rylance ever wrote, which went on to become a bonus track on the band's fourth major label studio album, KOKO.

In 2011, Langford-Taylor left the group and was replaced by Joe Singleton. In the intervening years, the band went on to support many major acts including Tom Jones, Paul Weller, Shed Seven, The Wonder Stuff, Richard Ashcroft and more. In 2013, the band released a single, "Learn to Sleep", followed by a five-track EP, "Somebody Loved You". A further EP, "The Meaning of Life", followed in 2016, alongside a double A-side single, "Young Love" / "I Know", which was promoted alongside the band's tour with The Wonder Stuff. In 2018, the band released the single "That's Not Entertainment".

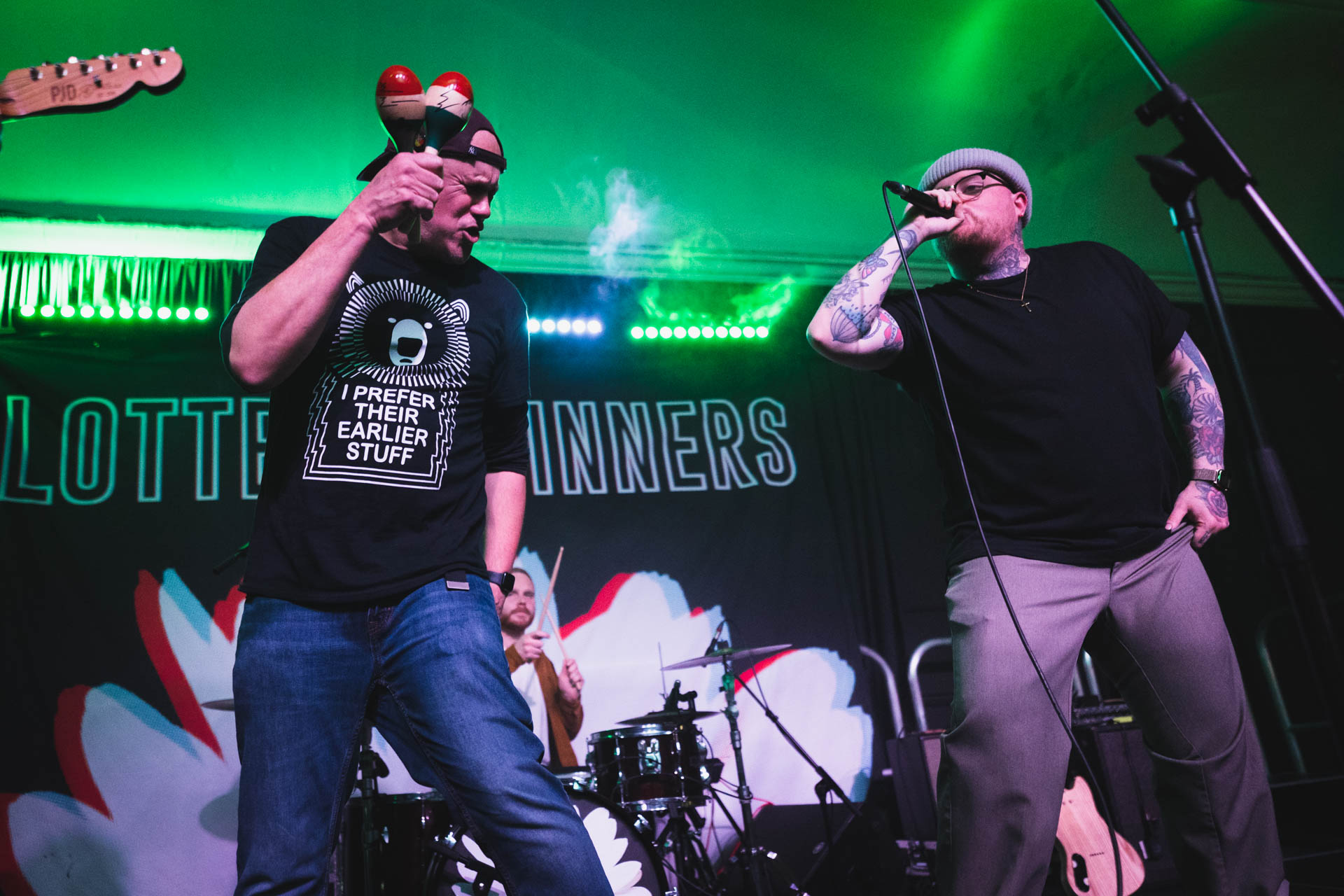
Singleton (on drums) and Rylance (right) with a fan on maracas (left) imitating Bez

In 2019, the band were discovered at a live showcase by music mogul Seymour Stein. He went on to help them sign to Modern Sky UK, where they released their self-titled major label debut album in 2020, just a week before the COVID-19 pandemic. As a result of this, they were unable to promote the album, so instead, took to recording a covers album, Sounds of Isolation, which was released that August. For Record Store Day, the band released a 7" single which featured a brand new track, "Love Will Keep Us Together". In March 2021, the band released a new EP, Start Again, which featured a mix of covers and new tracks, some of which would later go on to feature on their second major label album, Something to Leave the House For, which was released that December.

In April 2023, the band released their third studio album, ‘Anxiety Replacement Therapy’, which saw them collaborating with the likes of Frank Turner, Shaun Ryder and Boy George. The album debuted at #1 on the official UK Albums Chart, earning the band their first highly coveted top spot. Rylance described the album as a "self-help tape" for those struggling in life. Many major festivals followed in 2023, including Kendal Calling, Boardmasters, Isle of Wight and Glastonbury Festival, where they played six sets, the most by an original artist that year.

In late 2023 and early 2024, the band embarked on their ’This Is How It Feels’ tour, which saw a number of sell-out shows across the UK, finishing at a sold out O2 Apollo Manchester, which was later recorded for release on vinyl. A series of performances at festivals throughout 2024 followed.

The band's fourth major label studio album, KOKO (an initialism for Keep on keeping on), was announced in September 2024. The album became the band's second number one on the UK Albums Chart upon its release in March 2025. The success led the band to become the main support act for Robbie Williams on his Britpop Tour, which saw them play a number of sold out dates across the UK and Europe in 2025 and will support again in Australia and New Zealand in 2026.

On 30 May 2026, the band played their biggest headline show ever at the Leigh Sports Village. They debuted a new song called “Song for Leigh” here under the name “Song for Leigh Collective” which they worked on with young artists from around Leigh (Caitlin Leitch, Ewan Canton, Owen Fitzmaurice, Ethan Tyrrell, Marti Boardman, Oliver Baxter, and Kerrick Mills); the song released on shortly after the first showing of the song at Leigh Sports Village Stadium on 1 June 2026. Other special guests at the concert included Frank Turner and Reverend and the Makers, and support came from Scouting for Girls, The Lilacs and DJ Katie Owen.

On 30 July 2026, the band performed at the Pol'and'Rock Festival in Czaplinek, Poland.

== Discography ==
=== Studio albums ===
- The Lottery Winners (13 March 2020) – No. 23 UK
- Something to Leave the House For (3 December 2021) – No. 11 UK
- Anxiety Replacement Therapy (28 April 2023) – No. 1 UK Certified Gold (UK)
- KOKO (21 March 2025) – No. 1 UK

=== Cover albums ===
- Sounds of Isolation (21 August 2020) – No. 61 UK

=== Singles ===
- "Elizabeth" (April 2013)
- "I Know" (October 2015)
- "Young Love" (April 2016)
- "That's Not Entertainment" (November 2018)
- "Hawaii" (September 2019)
- "Little Things" (November 2019)
- "21" (January 2020)
- "Headlock" (February 2020)
- "The Meaning of Life" (March 2020)
- "Love Will Keep Us Together" (April 2020)
- "An Open Letter to Creatives" (November 2020)
- "Start Again" (feat. Frank Turner) (January 2021)
- "Rockstar" (with Nickelback) (February 2021)
- "Bad Things" (feat. Sleeper) (February 2021)
- "Times Are Changing" (May 2021)
- "Favourite Flavour" (June 2021)
- "Sunshine" (July 2021)
- "Dance With The Devil" (feat KT Tunstall) (September 2021)
- "Much Better" (October 2021)
- "Love Yourself" (October 2022)
- "Worry" (January 2023)
- "Money" (feat. Shaun Ryder) (February 2023)
- "Let Me Down" (feat. Boy George) (March 2023)
- "Burning House" (April 2023)
- "Letter To Myself" (feat. Frank Turner) (April 2023)
- "You Again" (feat. Reverend and the Makers) (September 2024)
- "Superpower" (October 2024)
- "UFO" (November 2024)
- "Dirt and Gold" (feat. Frank Turner) (January 2025)
- "Turn Around" (February 2025)
- "Ragdoll" (feat Chad Kroeger) (March 2025)

== Tours ==
=== Headlining ===
- Debut Album Celebration Tour (2021)
- Something to Leave the House For Tour (2021–22)
- Anxiety Replacement Therapy Tour (2022–23)
- This is How It Feels Tour (2023–24)
- Keep On Keeping On Tour (2024–25)
- KOKO Tour Part 2 (2025)

=== Support ===
- The Wonder Stuff (2016)
- Sleeper - 2018 Tour (2018)
- Nickelback - Get Rollin' Tour (2024)
- Robbie Williams - Britpop Tour (2025-26)
- Sam Ryder - The Road to Wembley (2025)
- Robbie Williams - Long 90's (2026)
