= Anxiety Replacement Therapy =

Studio album by the Lottery Winners
- Released: 28 April 2023
- Genre: Indie rock
- Length: 38:54
- Label: Modern Sky UK

The Lottery Winners chronology
Something to Leave the House For (2021)	Anxiety Replacement Therapy (2023)	KOKO (2025)

Anxiety Replacement Therapy is the fifth studio album by the English indie pop band the Lottery Winners, released on 28 April 2023 through Modern Sky UK. It includes collaborations with Shaun Ryder, Frank Turner and Boy George, as well as three spoken word interludes performed by the actor Stephen Fry. The collaboration with George, "Let Me Down", was also released as a single. The band embarked on a tour throughout April through to mid-2023 in support of the album.

== Background ==
The album was written by the band's lead vocalist Thom Rylance about his struggles with his mental health, following a year in his life. "Worry" was written by Rylance when he felt at his lowest; he stated that "Writing songs releases those dark emotions, so it's healthy for me."

== Critical reception ==
Professional ratings
Review scores
Source	Rating
Belfast Telegraph	6/10
Retro Pop Magazine	4/5 stars

Alex Green of the Belfast Telegraph called the album a "star-studded affair" on account of its collaborations, and wrote that it "goes for the jugular with anthemic choruses and a maximalist indie rock palate". Green concluded that while "the album is redolent of the lad rock of Hard-Fi and the blissed out pop of Blossoms", its tracks "are delivered with enough energy and passion to make them worth your time".

Retro Pop Magazine described Anxiety Replacement Therapy as "loud and bombastic; a guise for the thinly-veiled lyrical content that speaks openly on various stages of mental illness, from depression and stress to reclusiveness and obsessiveness", as well as "intrinsically personal yet speaks to a range of emotions that have become a part of everyday living for many, for a finely-crafted collection of commercial hits that pack a meaningful punch".

== Commercial performance ==
The album was highly publicised on the band's social media platforms with fans being urged to buy multiple copies, formats and versions. Anxiety Replacement Therapy was placed at number one on the midweek UK Albums Chart dated 1 May 2023, a position it kept over the week, making it the band's first top 10 and number one album. The album was released in 25 different formats, including 12 different CD versions, six vinyl LPs and five cassettes, which was not as many as the 32 formats that The Reytons' What's Rock and Roll? album came in, though The Lottery Winners' album sold more in one week, registering 22,209 sales, a total which was more than all their other album's sales combined.

== Track listing ==
Anxiety Replacement Therapy track listing
No.	Title	Length
1.	"(Play)"	1:05
2.	"Worry"	3:06
3.	"Burning House"	3:36
4.	"Money" (featuring Shaun Ryder)	3:40
5.	"Long Way Down"	4:16
6.	"Sertraline"	3:06
7.	"(Pause)"	0:17
8.	"Letter to Myself" (featuring Frank Turner)	3:56
9.	"Jennie"	4:31
10.	"Let Me Down" (featuring Boy George)	3:14
11.	"You're Not Alone"	3:07
12.	"Anxiety Replacement Therapy"	4:36
13.	"(Stop)"	0:24
Total length:		38:54

== Charts ==
Chart performance for Anxiety Replacement Therapy
Chart (2023)	Peak position
Scottish Albums (OCC)	4
UK Albums (OCC)	1
UK Independent Albums (OCC)	14
