= List of UK Dance Albums Chart number ones of 2023 =

These are the Official Charts Company's UK Dance Albums Chart number ones of 2023. The chart week runs from Friday to Thursday with the chart-date given as the following Thursday.

== Chart history ==
Issue date	Album	Artist(s)	Record label	Ref.
5 January	Forever Faithless – The Greatest Hits	Faithless	Cheeky	
12 January	Lost in Trance	Various Artists	UMOD	
19 January	Cream Superclub Classics	Various Artists	New State	
26 January	Cream Superclub Classics	Various Artists	New State	
2 February	Lost in Trance	Various Artists	UMOD	
9 February	Dave Pearce Dance Anthems	Various Artists	New State	
16 February	Dave Pearce Dance Anthems	Various Artists	New State	
23 February	Dave Pearce Dance Anthems	Various Artists	New State	
2 March	Optical Delusion	Orbital	London Music Stream	
9 March	Off World Tales	Philip D Kick	Astrophonica	
16 March	Every Cloud - Silver Linings	Sigala	Ministry of Sound	
23 March	Sunrise Bang Ur Head Against Tha Wall	Nia Archives	Island	
30 March	Dave Pearce Dance Anthems	Various Artists	New State	
6 April	Dave Pearce Dance Anthems	Various Artists	New State	
13 April	Imagine This Is a High Dimensional Space of All Possibilities	James Holden	Border Community	
20 April	Dave Pearce Dance Anthems	Various Artists	New State	
27 April	Anjunadeep 14	Various Artists	Anjunadeep	
4 May	Drive	Tiësto	Atlantic	
11 May	Prism	The Orb	Cooking Vinyl	
18 May	Dave Pearce Dance Anthems	Various Artists	New State	
25 May	Good Lies	Overmono	XL	
1 June	Evolve	Sub Focus	Mercury	
8 June	Dave Pearce Dance Anthems	Various Artists	New State	
15 June	Dave Pearce Dance Anthems	Various Artists	New State	
22 June	Nevertheless	Chicane	Modena	
29 June	Neon Nights	Dannii Minogue	London Music Stream	
6 July	Actual Life 3 (January 1 – September 9 2022)	Fred Again	Atlantic	
13 July	Dave Pearce Dance Anthems	Various Artists	New State	
20 July	Dave Pearce Trance Anthems	Various Artists	New State	
27 July	Alchemy	Disclosure	Apollo	
3 August	Salvation	Gorgon City	Positiva	
10 August	Dave Pearce Dance Anthems	Various Artists	New State	
17 August	Dave Pearce Trance Anthems	Various Artists	New State	
24 August	Settle	Disclosure	Island/UMR	
31 August	Pacha - Ibiza Classics	Various Artists	New State	
7 September	Dave Pearce Dance Anthems	Various Artists	New State	
14 September	Dave Pearce Dance Anthems	Various Artists	New State	
21 September	For That Beautiful Feeling	The Chemical Brothers	EMI	
28 September	Hit Parade	Róisín Murphy	Ninja Tune	
5 October	Playing Robots into Heaven	James Blake	Republic	
12 October	Level 42	Level 42	Polydor	
19 October	Another Friday Night	Joel Corry	Atlantic	
26 October	For That Beautiful Feeling	The Chemical Brothers	EMI	
2 November	When Will We Land	Barry Can't Swim	Ninja Tune	
9 November	Action Adventure	DJ Shadow	Mass Appeal	
16 November	Cult Classics	Joy Anonymous	Island	
23 November	2 RUFF, Vol. 1	Chase & Status	EMI	
30 November	2 RUFF, Vol. 1	Chase & Status	EMI	
7 December	2 RUFF, Vol. 1	Chase & Status	EMI	
14 December	2 RUFF, Vol. 1	Chase & Status	EMI	
21 December	2 RUFF, Vol. 1	Chase & Status	EMI	
28 December	2 RUFF, Vol. 1	Chase & Status	EMI	

== See also ==
- List of UK Albums Chart number ones of 2023
- List of UK Dance Singles Chart number ones of 2023
- List of UK Album Downloads Chart number ones of 2023
- List of UK Independent Albums Chart number ones of 2023
- List of UK R&B Albums Chart number ones of 2023
- List of UK Rock & Metal Albums Chart number ones of 2023
- List of UK Compilation Chart number ones of the 2020s
