= List of UK Independent Albums Chart number ones of 2023 =

These are the Official Charts Company's UK Independent Albums Chart number ones of 2023.

== Chart history ==
Issue date	Album	Artist(s)	Record label	Ref.
6 January	AM	Arctic Monkeys	Domino	
13 January	Phosphorescent	Gabrielle Aplin	Never Fade	
20 January	Never Going Under	Circa Waves	Lower Fade	
27 January ^{[a]}	What's Rock and Roll?	The Reytons	The Reytons	
3 February	Chaos & Colour	Uriah Heep	Silver Lining Music	
10 February ^{[b]}	My 21st Century Blues	Raye	Human Re Sources	
17 February	Truth Decay	You Me at Six	Underdog	
24 February	Inhale/Exhale	Those Damn Crows	Earache	
3 March	One In A Thousand	Obey Robots	My Big Sister Recordings	
10 March	I Can Only Be Me	Eva Cassidy	Blix Street	
17 March	UK Grim	Sleaford Mods	Rough Trade	
24 March	Fistful of Peaches	Black Honey	FoxFive	
31 March	The Other One	Babymetal	Cooking Vinyl	
7 April	3 Feet High and Rising	De La Soul	Chrysalis	
14 April	Stereo Mind Game	Daughter	4AD	
21 April	God Save the Streets	Avelino	More Music Oddchild	
28 April ^{[a]}	A Kiss for the Whole World	Enter Shikari	So Recordings	
5 May	First Two Pages of Frankenstein	The National	4AD	
12 May	First Lap	Tunde	Tunde	
19 May	The Love Invention	Alison Goldfrapp	Skint	
26 May	Now	Graham Nash	BMG	
2 June	My Soft Machine	Arlo Parks	Transgressive	
9 June	Council Skies	Noel Gallagher's High Flying Birds	Sour Mash	
16 June	Power to Play	McFly	BMG	
23 June	In Times New Roman...	Queens of the Stone Age	Matador	
30 June	In Times New Roman...	Queens of the Stone Age	Matador	
7 July	Chaos for the Fly	Grian Chatten	Partisan	
14 July	I Inside the Old Year Dying	PJ Harvey	Partisan	
21 July	You & I	Rita Ora	BMG	
28 July	Join the Club	As December Falls	ADF	
4 August	The Feminine Divine	Dexys Midnight Runners	100% records	
11 August	Smile	Skindred	Earache	
18 August	The Death of Randy Fitzsimmons	The Hives	Disques Hives	
25 August	Exorcism of Youth	The View	Cooking Vinyl	
1 September	Euphoria	Claire Richards	Edsel	
8 September	Everything Is Alive	Slowdive	Dead Oceans	
15 September	Hit Parade	Róisín Murphy	Ninja Tune	
22 September ^{[a]}	Greatest Hits 2.0	Busted	Juno	
29 September ^{[a]}	Tension	Kylie Minogue	BMG	
6 October ^{[a]}	Autumn Variations	Ed Sheeran	Gingerbread Man	
13 October	The Dark Side of the Moon Redux	Roger Waters	Cooking Vinyl	
20 October ^{[a]}	Sick Boi	Ren	The Other Songs	
27 October	My Big Day	Bombay Bicycle Club	AWAL/MMM	
3 November	Bauhaus Staircase	OMD	100%	
10 November	Spirit Power: The Best of Johnny Marr	Johnny Marr	BMG	
17 November	All the Little Lights (Anniversary Edition)	Passenger	Black Crow	
24 November ^{[a]}	Theatre of the Absurd Presents C'est la Vie	Madness	BMG	
1 December	Theatre of the Absurd Presents C'est la Vie	Madness	BMG	
8 December	Theatre of the Absurd Presents C'est la Vie	Madness	BMG	
15 December	Tension	Kylie Minogue	BMG	
22 December	Theatre of the Absurd Presents C'est la Vie	Madness	BMG	
29 December	AM	Arctic Monkeys	Domino	

== Notes ==
- ^{a} – The single was simultaneously number-one on the Album chart.
- ^{b} - The artist was simultaneously number one on the Independent Singles Chart.

== See also ==
- List of UK Rock & Metal Albums Chart number ones of 2023
- List of UK Album Downloads Chart number ones of 2023
- List of UK Dance Albums Chart number ones of 2023
- List of UK R&B Albums Chart number ones of 2023
- List of UK Independent Singles Chart number ones of 2023
