= List of UK Independent Singles Chart number ones of 2023 =

These are the Official Charts Company's UK Independent Singles Chart number-one singles of 2023.

== Chart history ==
Chart date (week ending)	Song	Artist(s)	Record label	References
5 January	"Merry Xmas Everybody"	Slade	BMG	
12 January ^{[a]}	"Escapism"	Raye featuring 070 Shake	Human Re Sources	
19 January	"Escapism"	Raye featuring 070 Shake	Human Re Sources	
26 January	"Escapism"	Raye featuring 070 Shake	Human Re Sources	
2 February	"Escapism"	Raye featuring 070 Shake	Human Re Sources	
9 February	"Escapism"	Raye featuring 070 Shake	Human Re Sources	
16 February ^{[b]}	"Escapism"	Raye featuring 070 Shake	Human Re Sources	
23 February	"Escapism"	Raye featuring 070 Shake	Human Re Sources	
2 March	"Escapism"	Raye featuring 070 Shake	Human Re Sources	
9 March	"Escapism"	Raye featuring 070 Shake	Human Re Sources	
16 March	"Escapism"	Raye featuring 070 Shake	Human Re Sources	
23 March	"Escapism"	Raye featuring 070 Shake	Human Re Sources	
30 March	"Escapism"	Raye featuring 070 Shake	Human Re Sources	
6 April	"Escapism"	Raye featuring 070 Shake	Human Re Sources	
13 April	"Escapism"	Raye featuring 070 Shake	Human Re Sources	
20 April	"Escapism"	Raye featuring 070 Shake	Human Re Sources	
27 April	"Escapism"	Raye featuring 070 Shake	Human Re Sources	
4 May	"Escapism"	Raye featuring 070 Shake	Human Re Sources	
11 May	"Escapism"	Raye featuring 070 Shake	Human Re Sources	
18 May	"Scrap the Monarchy"	The Krown Jewelz	Pegging Prince	
25 May	"Escapism"	Raye featuring 070 Shake	Human Re Sources	
1 June	"Escapism"	Raye featuring 070 Shake	Human Re Sources	
8 June	"Escapism"	Raye featuring 070 Shake	Human Re Sources	
15 June	"Padam Padam"	Kylie Minogue	BMG	
22 June	"Padam Padam"	Kylie Minogue	BMG	
29 June	"Padam Padam"	Kylie Minogue	BMG	
6 July	"(It Goes Like) Nanana"	Peggy Gou	XL	
13 July	"(It Goes Like) Nanana"	Peggy Gou	XL	
20 July	"(It Goes Like) Nanana"	Peggy Gou	XL	
27 July	"(It Goes Like) Nanana"	Peggy Gou	XL	
3 August	"(It Goes Like) Nanana"	Peggy Gou	XL	
10 August	"(It Goes Like) Nanana"	Peggy Gou	XL	
17 August	"(It Goes Like) Nanana"	Peggy Gou	XL	
24 August	"(It Goes Like) Nanana"	Peggy Gou	XL	
31 August	"(It Goes Like) Nanana"	Peggy Gou	XL	
7 September	"(It Goes Like) Nanana"	Peggy Gou	XL	
14 September	"(It Goes Like) Nanana"	Peggy Gou	XL	
21 September	"(It Goes Like) Nanana"	Peggy Gou	XL	
28 September	"(It Goes Like) Nanana"	Peggy Gou	XL	
5 October	"(It Goes Like) Nanana"	Peggy Gou	XL	
12 October	"Asking"	Sonny Fodera and MK featuring Clementine Douglas	Solotoko	
19 October	"Asking"	Sonny Fodera and MK featuring Clementine Douglas	Solotoko	
26 October	"Asking"	Sonny Fodera and MK featuring Clementine Douglas	Solotoko	
2 November	"Asking"	Sonny Fodera and MK featuring Clementine Douglas	Solotoko	
9 November	"My Love Mine All Mine"	Mitski	Dead Oceans	
16 November	"My Love Mine All Mine"	Mitski	Dead Oceans	
23 November	"My Love Mine All Mine"	Mitski	Dead Oceans	
30 November	"My Love Mine All Mine"	Mitski	Dead Oceans	
7 December	"My Love Mine All Mine"	Mitski	Dead Oceans	
14 December	"Merry Xmas Everybody"	Slade	BMG	
21 December	"Merry Xmas Everybody"	Slade	BMG	
28 December	"Merry Xmas Everybody"	Slade	BMG	

== Notes ==
- ^{a} – The single was simultaneously number-one on the singles chart.
- ^{b} - The artist was simultaneously number one on the Independent Albums Chart.

== Number-one Indie artists ==
Position	Artist	Weeks at number one
1	Raye	21
1	070 Shake (as featuring)	21
2	Peggy Gou	14
3	Mitski	5
4	Slade	4
5	Kylie Minogue	3
5	Sonny Fodera	3
5	MK	3
5	Clementine Douglas (as featuring)	3
6	The Krown Jewelz	1

== See also ==
- List of UK Dance Singles Chart number ones of 2023
- List of UK R&B Singles Chart number ones of 2023
- List of UK Rock & Metal Singles Chart number ones of 2023
- List of UK Independent Albums Chart number ones of 2023
