= List of UK Dance Singles Chart number ones of 2023 =

The UK Dance Singles Chart is a weekly music chart compiled in the United Kingdom by the Official Charts Company (OCC) from sales of songs in the dance music genre (house, drum and bass, dubstep, etc.) in record stores and digital downloads. The chart week runs from Friday to Thursday with the chart-date given as the following Thursday.

This is a list of the songs which were number one on the UK Dance Singles Chart during 2023.

== Chart history ==
Chart date (week ending)	Song	Artist(s)	References
5 January	"Messy in Heaven"	Venbee and Goddard	
12 January	"Messy in Heaven"	Venbee and Goddard	
19 January	"Messy in Heaven"	Venbee and Goddard	
26 January	"Messy in Heaven"	Venbee and Goddard	
2 February	"Messy in Heaven"	Venbee and Goddard	
9 February	"Messy in Heaven"	Venbee and Goddard	
16 February	"Messy in Heaven"	Venbee and Goddard	
23 February	"Messy in Heaven"	Venbee and Goddard	
2 March	"Messy in Heaven"	Venbee and Goddard	
9 March	"Messy in Heaven"	Venbee and Goddard	
16 March	"Messy in Heaven"	Venbee and Goddard	
23 March	"Miracle"	Calvin Harris and Ellie Goulding	
30 March	"Miracle"	Calvin Harris and Ellie Goulding	
6 April	"Miracle"	Calvin Harris and Ellie Goulding	
13 April ^{[a]}	"Miracle"	Calvin Harris and Ellie Goulding	
20 April ^{[a]}	"Miracle"	Calvin Harris and Ellie Goulding	
27 April	"Miracle"	Calvin Harris and Ellie Goulding	
4 May ^{[a]}	"Miracle"	Calvin Harris and Ellie Goulding	
11 May ^{[a]}	"Miracle"	Calvin Harris and Ellie Goulding	
18 May ^{[a]}	"Miracle"	Calvin Harris and Ellie Goulding	
25 May ^{[a]}	"Miracle"	Calvin Harris and Ellie Goulding	
1 June ^{[a]}	"Miracle"	Calvin Harris and Ellie Goulding	
8 June ^{[a]}	"Miracle"	Calvin Harris and Ellie Goulding	
15 June	"Miracle"	Calvin Harris and Ellie Goulding	
22 June	"Miracle"	Calvin Harris and Ellie Goulding	
29 June	"Miracle"	Calvin Harris and Ellie Goulding	
6 July	"Miracle"	Calvin Harris and Ellie Goulding	
13 July	"Miracle"	Calvin Harris and Ellie Goulding	
20 July	"Miracle"	Calvin Harris and Ellie Goulding	
27 July	"(It Goes Like) Nanana"	Peggy Gou	
3 August	"(It Goes Like) Nanana"	Peggy Gou	
10 August	"(It Goes Like) Nanana"	Peggy Gou	
17 August	"(It Goes Like) Nanana"	Peggy Gou	
24 August	"(It Goes Like) Nanana"	Peggy Gou	
31 August	"(It Goes Like) Nanana"	Peggy Gou	
7 September	"(It Goes Like) Nanana"	Peggy Gou	
14 September	"(It Goes Like) Nanana"	Peggy Gou	
21 September	"Adore U"	Fred Again and Obongjayar	
28 September	"Prada"	Cassö, Raye and D-Block Europe	
5 October	"Prada"	Cassö, Raye and D-Block Europe	
12 October	"Prada"	Cassö, Raye and D-Block Europe	
19 October	"Prada"	Cassö, Raye and D-Block Europe	
26 October	"Prada"	Cassö, Raye and D-Block Europe	
2 November	"Prada"	Cassö, Raye and D-Block Europe	
9 November	"Prada"	Cassö, Raye and D-Block Europe	
16 November	"Prada"	Cassö, Raye and D-Block Europe	
23 November	"Prada"	Cassö, Raye and D-Block Europe	
30 November	"Prada"	Cassö, Raye and D-Block Europe	
7 December	"Prada"	Cassö, Raye and D-Block Europe	
14 December	"Prada"	Cassö, Raye and D-Block Europe	
21 December	"Prada"	Cassö, Raye and D-Block Europe	
28 December	"Prada"	Cassö, Raye and D-Block Europe	

- ^{a} – the single was simultaneously number-one on the singles chart.

== Number-one artists ==
Position	Artist	Weeks at number one
1	Calvin Harris	18
1	Ellie Goulding	18
2	Cassö	14
2	Raye	14
2	D-Block Europe	14
3	Venbee	11
3	Goddard	11
4	Peggy Gou	8
5	Fred Again	1
5	Obongjayar	1

== See also ==
- List of number-one singles of 2023 (UK)
- List of UK Dance Albums Chart number ones of 2023
- List of UK R&B Singles Chart number ones of 2023
- List of UK Rock & Metal Singles Chart number ones of 2023
- List of UK Independent Singles Chart number ones of 2023
