= List of UK R&B Albums Chart number ones of 2023 =

The logo of the Official Charts Company, responsible for compiling all of the official music charts in the United Kingdom, including the R&B albums chart.

The UK R&B Albums Chart is a weekly chart, first introduced in October 1994, that ranks the 40 biggest-selling albums that are classified in the R&B genre in the United Kingdom. The chart is compiled by the Official Charts Company, and is based on sales of CDs, downloads, vinyl and other formats over the previous seven days.

The following are the number-one albums of 2023

== Number-one albums ==
Issue date	Album	Artist(s)	Record label	Ref.
5 January ^{[b]}	This Is What I Mean	Stormzy	0207/Merky	
12 January	Back to Black	Amy Winehouse	Island	
19 January	Back to Black	Amy Winehouse	Island	
26 January	Rap Game Awful	Clavish	Polydor	
2 February	Back to Black	Amy Winehouse	Island	
9 February	Hugo	Loyle Carner	EMI	
16 February	Back to Black	Amy Winehouse	Island	
23 February	Whitney	Whitney Houston	Arista	
2 March	Back to Black	Amy Winehouse	Island	
9 March	Back to Black	Amy Winehouse	Island	
16 March	Ugly	Slowthai	Method	
23 March	Ugly	Slowthai	Method	
30 March	3 Feet High and Rising	De La Soul	Chrysalis	
6 April	3 Feet High and Rising	De La Soul	Chrysalis	
13 April	3 Feet High and Rising	De La Soul	Chrysalis	
20 April	Hope	NF	EMI	
27 April	God Save the Streets	Avelino	More Music Oddchild	
4 May	Skala	Songer	Hard Reality	
11 May	Crop Circle 2	Nines	Warner	
18 May	First Lap	Tunde	Tunde	
25 May	Real Back in Style	Potter Payper	0207	
1 June	The Playlist	Steel Banglez	Gifted Music/Warner	
8 June	The Village is On Fire	Guvna B	Allo Mate	
15 June	Stakes Is High	De La Soul	Chrysalis	
22 June	Purple Hearts	Youngs Teflon and Tiny Boost	Trillin	
29 June	No Thank You	Little Simz	Forever Living Originals	
6 July	No Thank You	Little Simz	Forever Living Originals	
13 July	Back to Black	Amy Winehouse	Island	
20 July	Angels and Queens P1	Gabriels	Parlophone	
27 July	Beautiful and Brutal Yard	J Hus	Black Butter	
3 August	Angels and Queens P1	Gabriels	Parlophone	
10 August	Angels and Queens P1	Gabriels	Parlophone	
17 August	Timeless	N-Dubz	EMI	
24 August	Unfinished Business	Fredo	PG Records	
31 August	Scaring the Hoes	JPEGMafia and Danny Brown	Peggy	
7 September	I Told Them...	Burna Boy	Atlantic	
14 September	I Told Them...	Burna Boy	Atlantic	
21 September	My Neighbours Don't Know	M Huncho	Myb	
28 September	My Dear Melancholy	The Weeknd	XO/Republic	
5 October	Strength to Strength	Headie One and K-Trap	One Thousand8	
12 October	Falling or Flying	Jorja Smith	FAMM	
19 October	Crop Circle 3	Nines	Zino	
26 October ^{[a]}	Sick Boi	Ren	The Other Songs	
2 November	Lahai	Sampha	Young	
9 November	Famous Last Words	Casisdead	XL	
16 November	Sweet Justice	Tkay Maidza	4AD	
23 November	Back to Black	Amy Winehouse	Island	
30 November	Yours Truly	Ariana Grande	Republic	
7 December	Back to Black	Amy Winehouse	Island	
14 December	Back to Black	Amy Winehouse	Island	
21 December	Pink Friday 2	Nicki Minaj	Island	
28 December	Back to Black	Amy Winehouse	Island	

== Notes ==
- ^{a} - The album was simultaneously number-one on the UK Albums Chart.
- ^{b} - The artist was simultaneously number-one on the R&B Singles Chart.

== See also ==
- List of UK Albums Chart number ones of the 2020s
- List of UK R&B Singles Chart number ones of 2023
