= Brit Award for International Group =

British music award

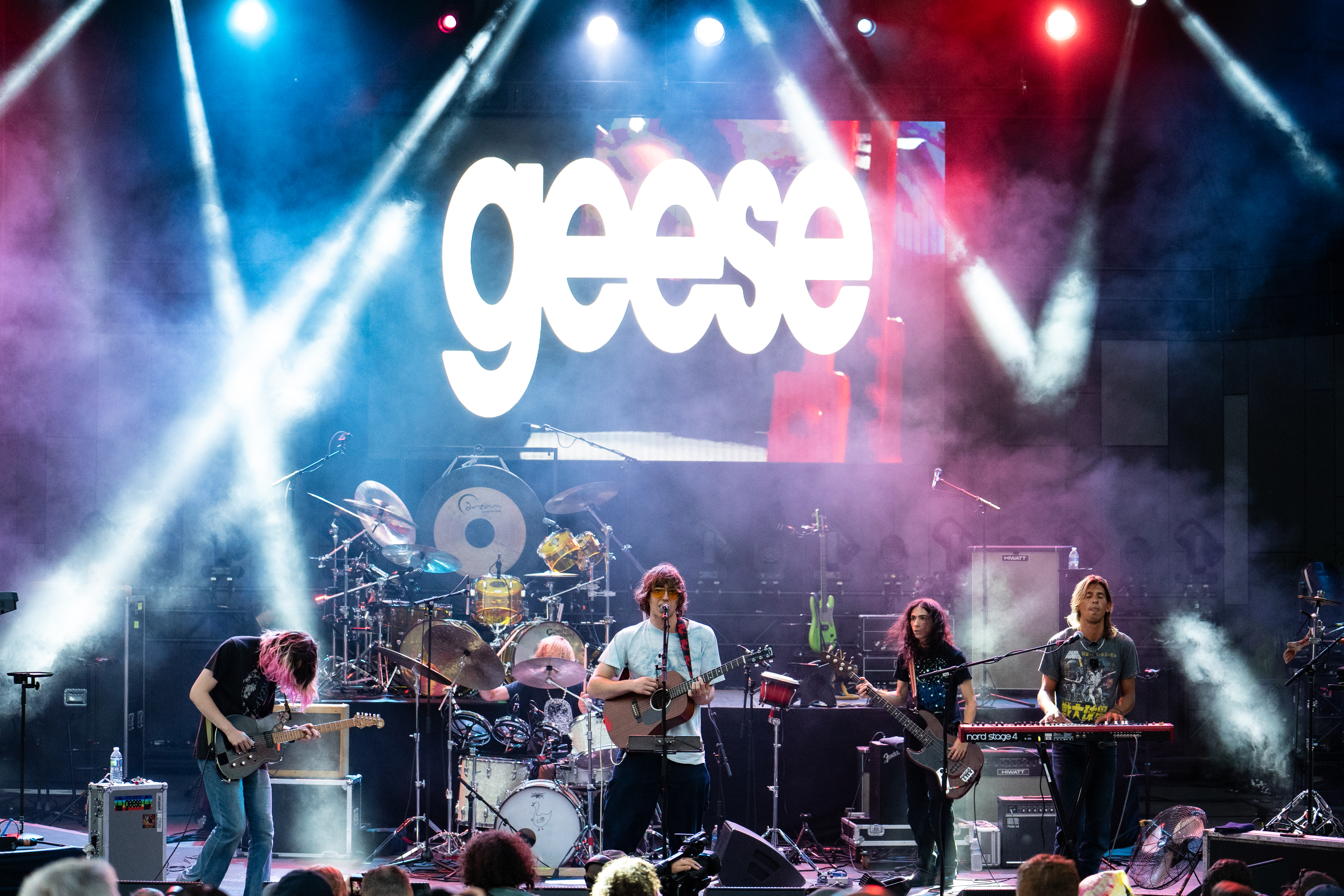
- Current winner: Geese
- Awarded for: Achievement in Excellent International Group
- Country: United Kingdom (UK)
- Presented by: British Phonographic Industry (BPI)
- First award: 1986
- Currently held by: Geese (2026)

Highlights
- Most awards: U2 (5)
- Most nominations: U2 (11)
- Website: www.brits.co.uk

The Brit Award for International Group is an award given by the British Phonographic Industry (BPI), an organisation which represents record companies and artists in the United Kingdom. The accolade is presented at the Brit Awards, an annual celebration of British and international music. The winners and nominees are determined by the Brit Awards voting academy with over one-thousand members, which comprise record labels, publishers, managers, agents, media, and previous winners and nominees.

The inaugural recipients of the award were Huey Lewis and the News in 1986. U2 hold the record for most wins in the category, with five, while The Black Eyed Peas and First Aid Kit share the record for most nominations without a win, with three. The current holder of the award is Geese, who won in 2026.

== History ==
Although the award was first presented in 1986 as International Group, the Brit Award for International Artist (featuring groups and solo artists as nominees) was presented prior to the creation of this category and was won by American groups Kid Creole and the Coconuts and The Revolution in 1983 and 1985 respectively. The award was not handed out in 2010 or the 2020 Brit Awards but returned in the following years.

Throughout the tenure of the category, artists from the United States have won twenty-six times, more than groups from any other country. Groups from Ireland have won seven times, and groups from Australia, including partially New Zealand band Crowded House, have won three times. Groups from Canada and France have won once. Dave Grohl, Jay-Z and Beyoncé are the only artists to be nominated for work in different groups (Grohl for Nirvana and Foo Fighters, Beyonce for Destiny's Child and The Carters, Jay-Z as part of a duo with Kanye West and the aforementioned Carters). The only artists with consecutive wins are U2, with three between 1988 and 1990, and R.E.M., who won in 1992 and 1993.

== Winners and nominees ==
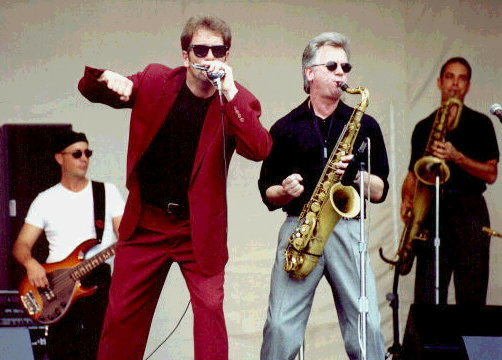
Inaugural winner Huey Lewis and the News

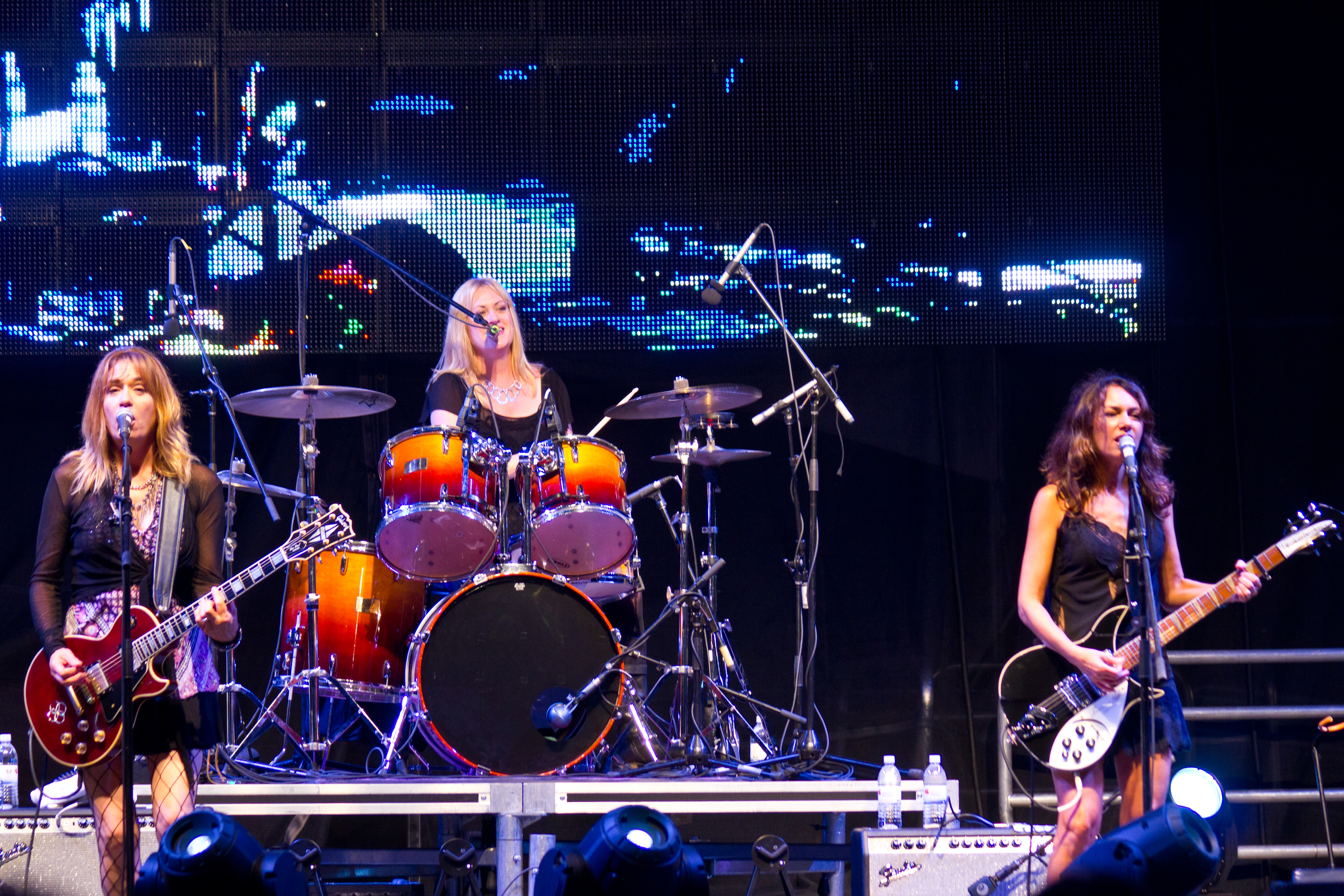
1987 recipients The Bangles were the first female group to win the award

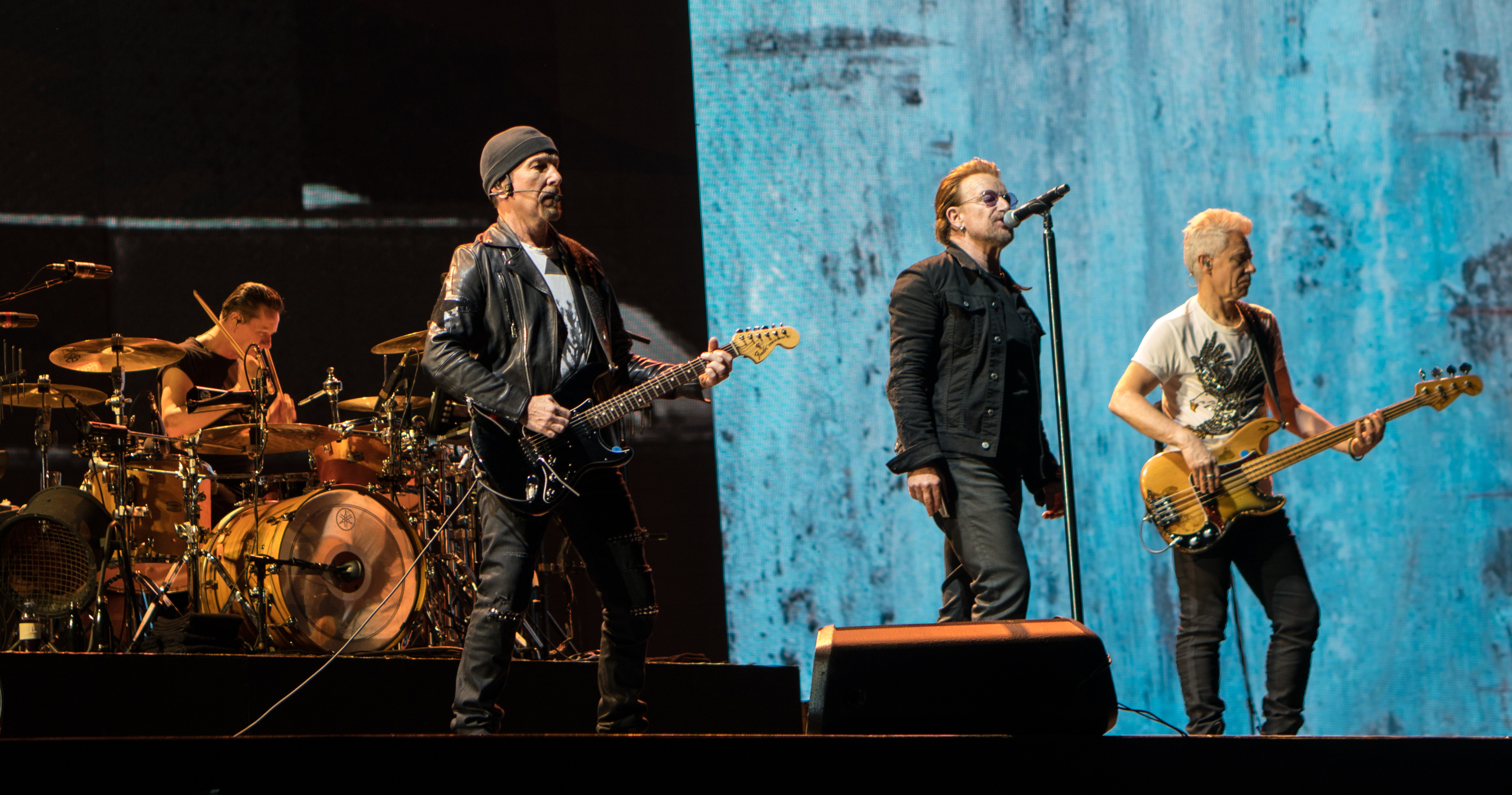
Five-time winner U2 have the most wins in this category

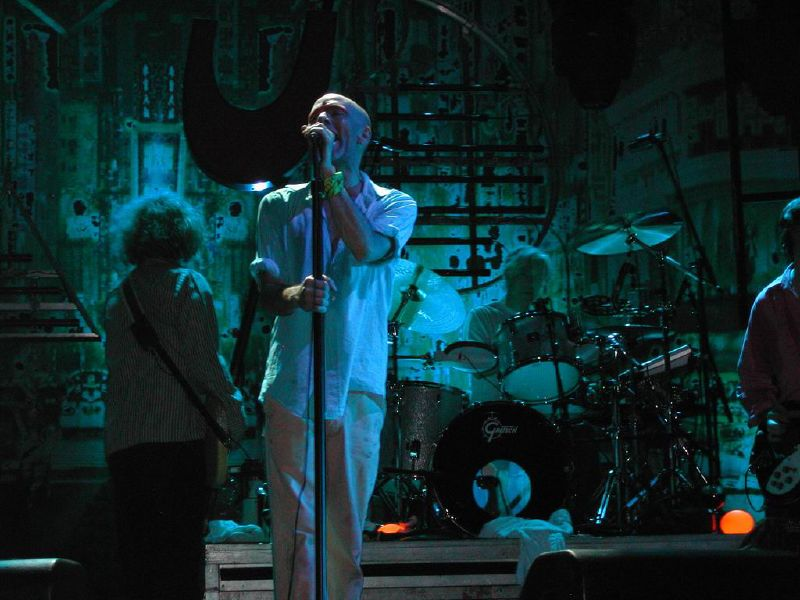
Three-time winner R.E.M.

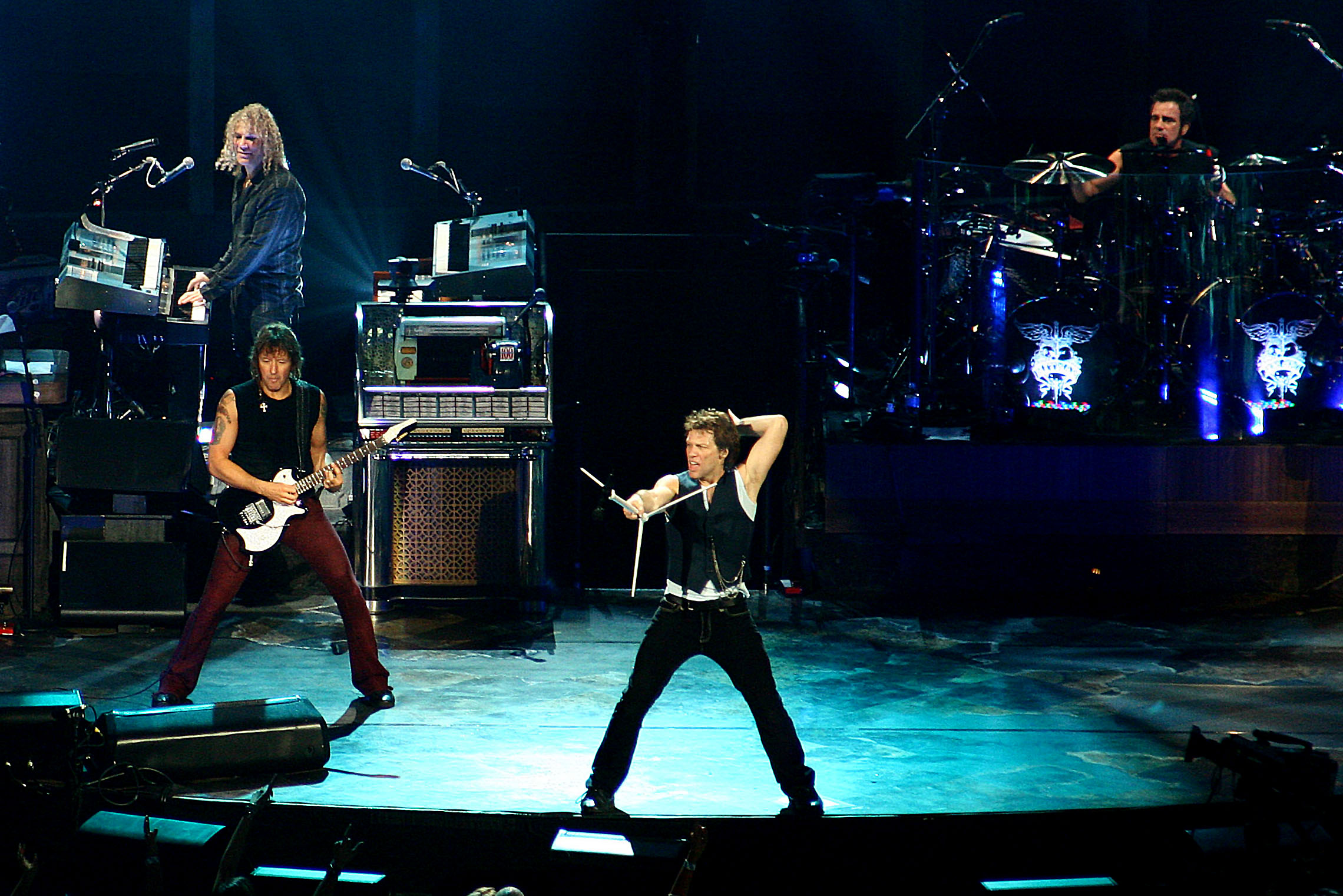
1996 winner Bon Jovi

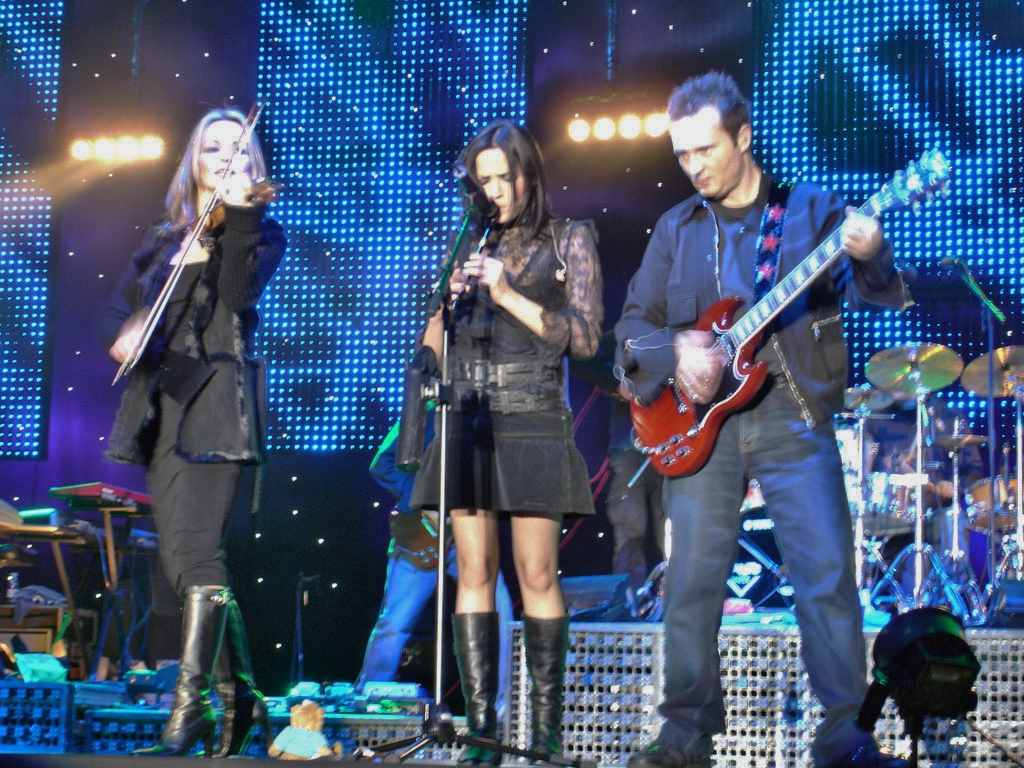
1999 winner The Corrs

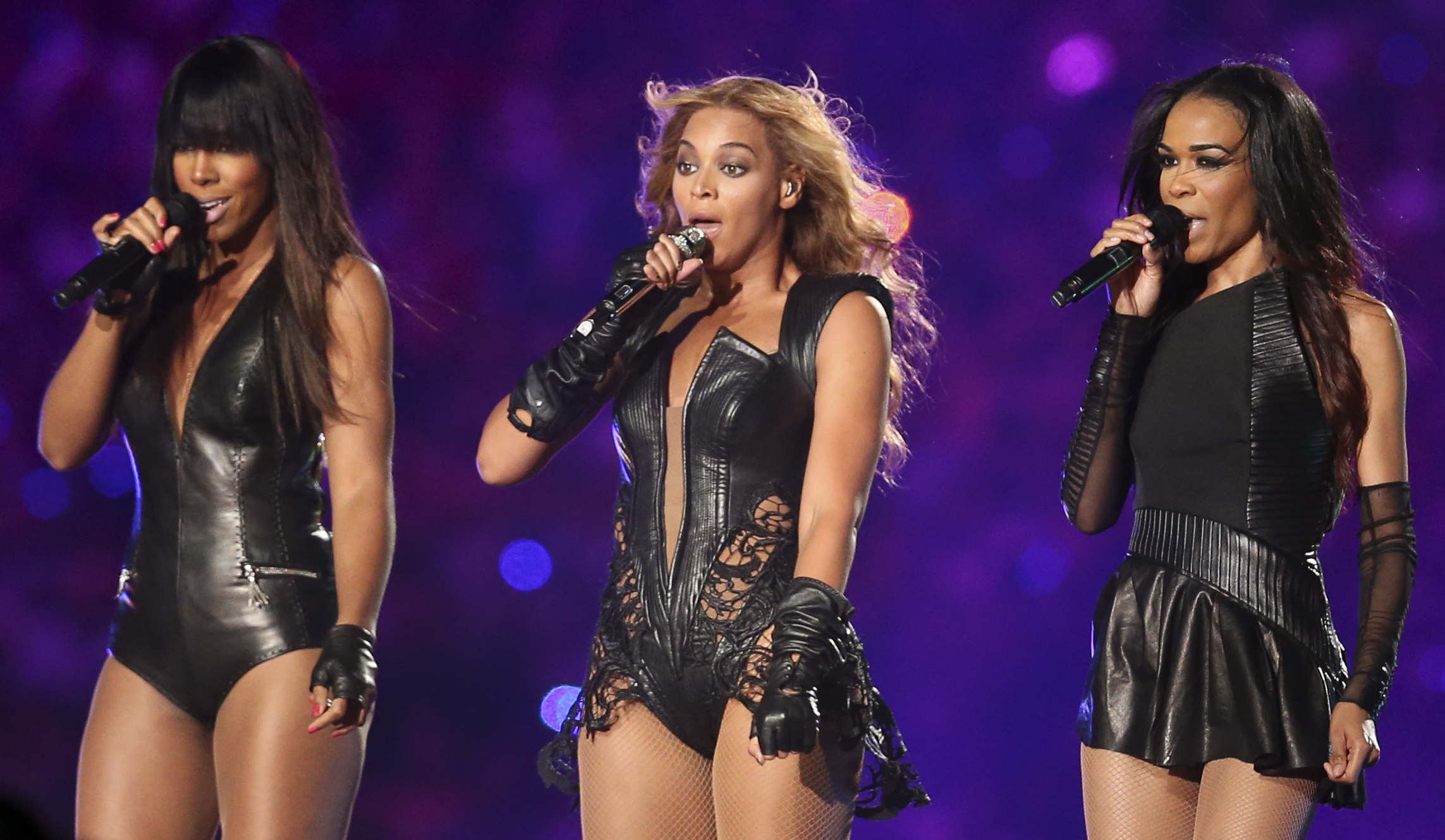
2002 winner Destiny's Child

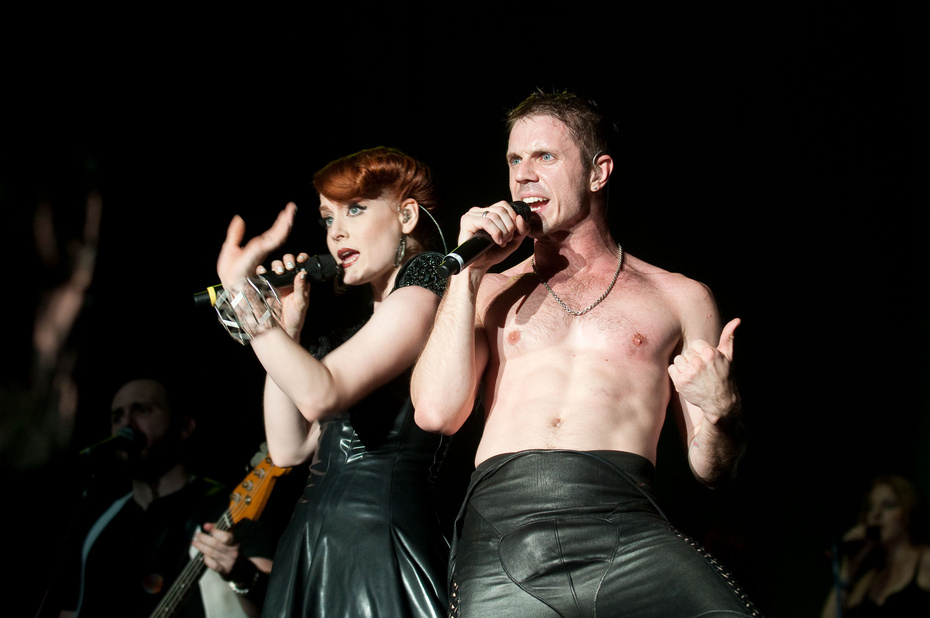
2005 winner Scissor Sisters

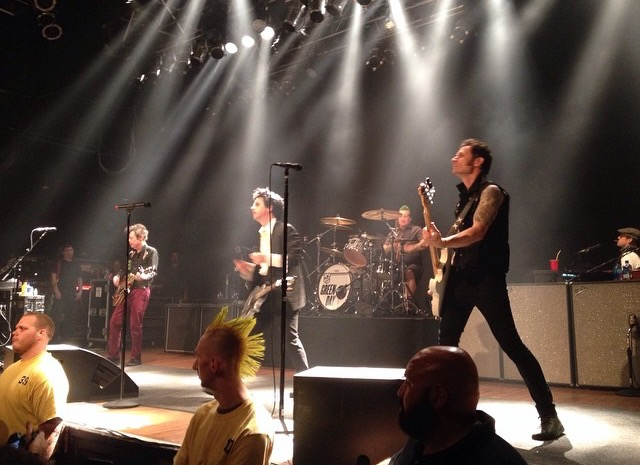
2006 winner Green Day

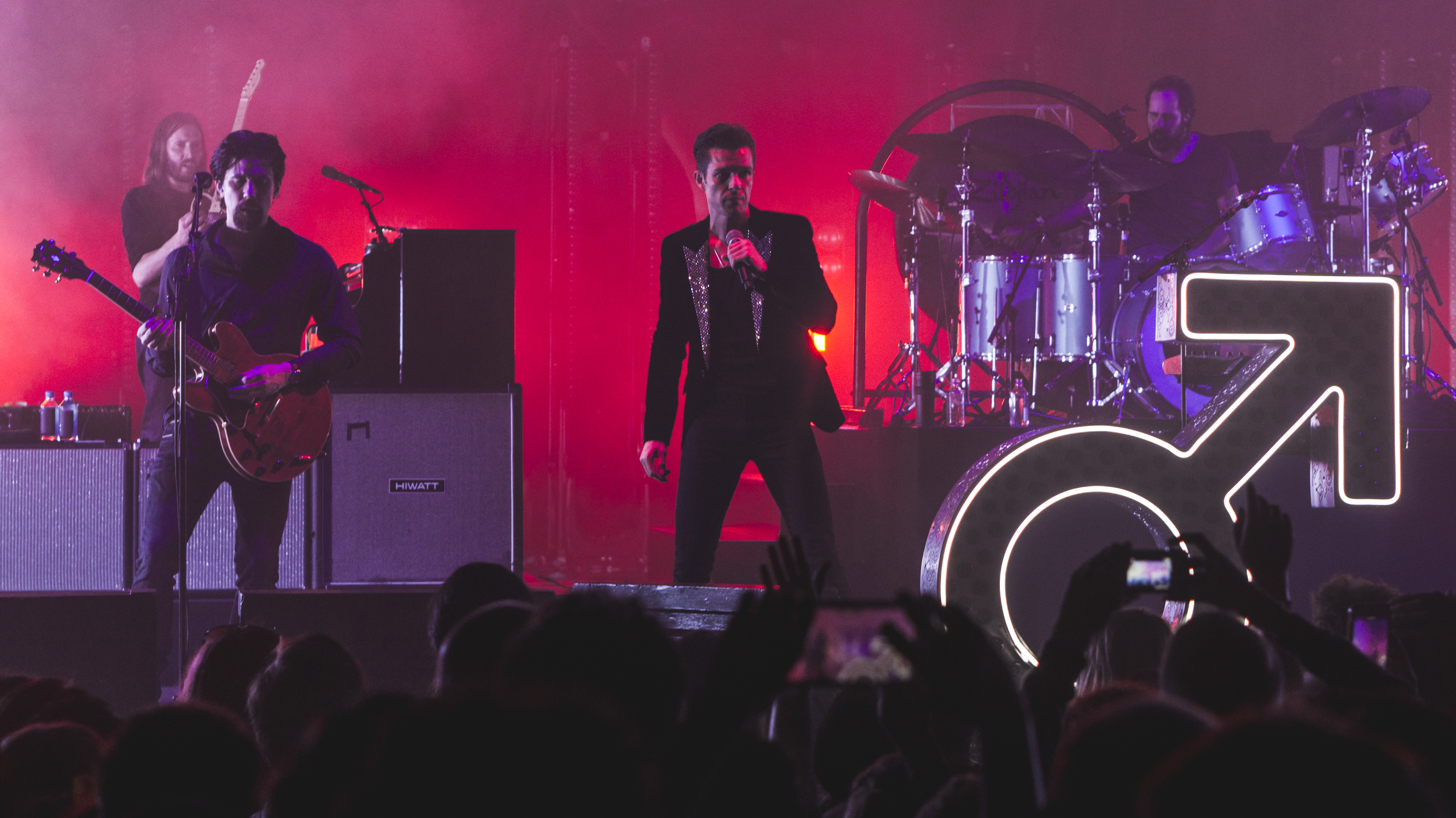
2007 winner The Killers

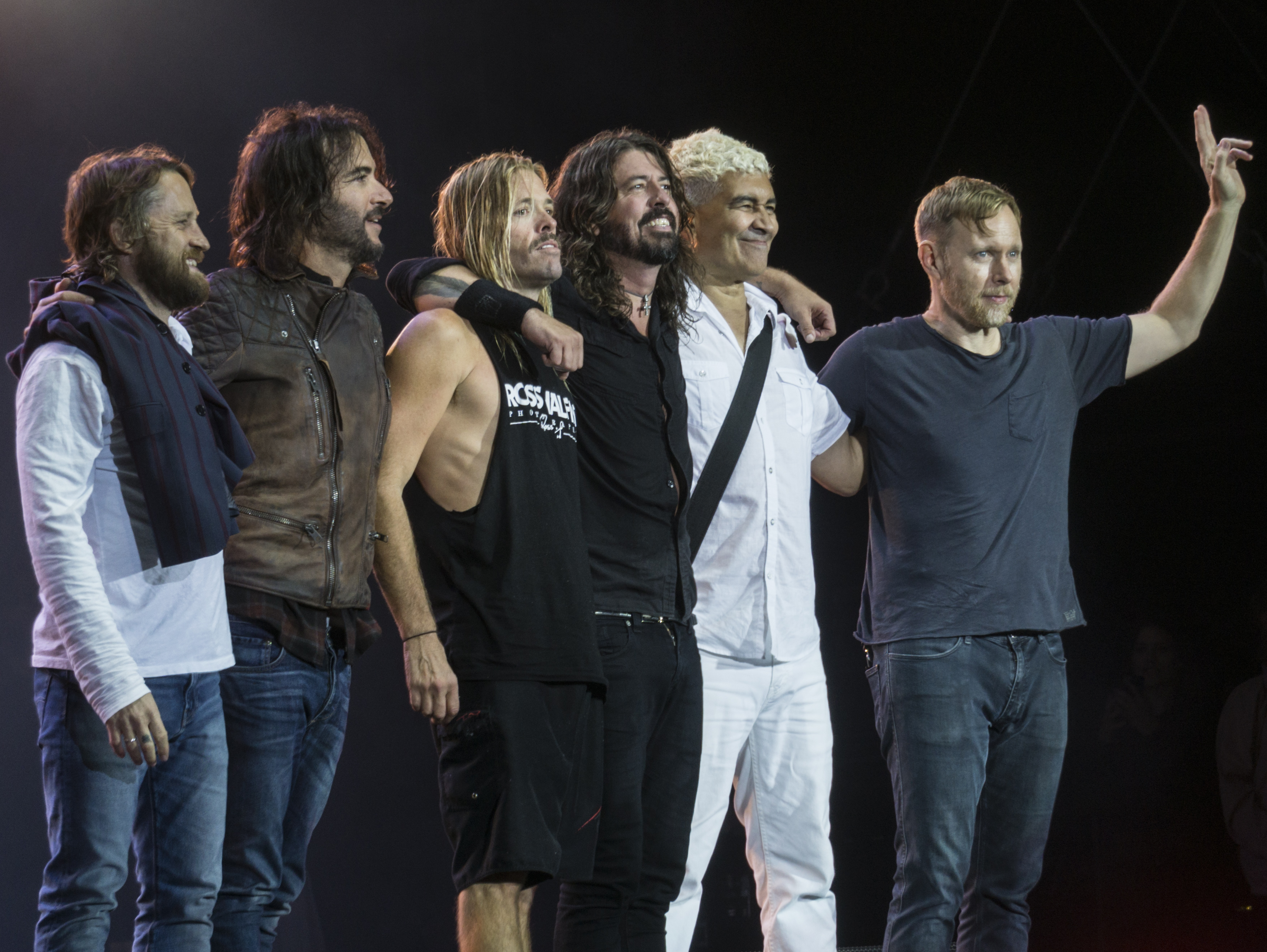
Four-time winner Foo Fighters

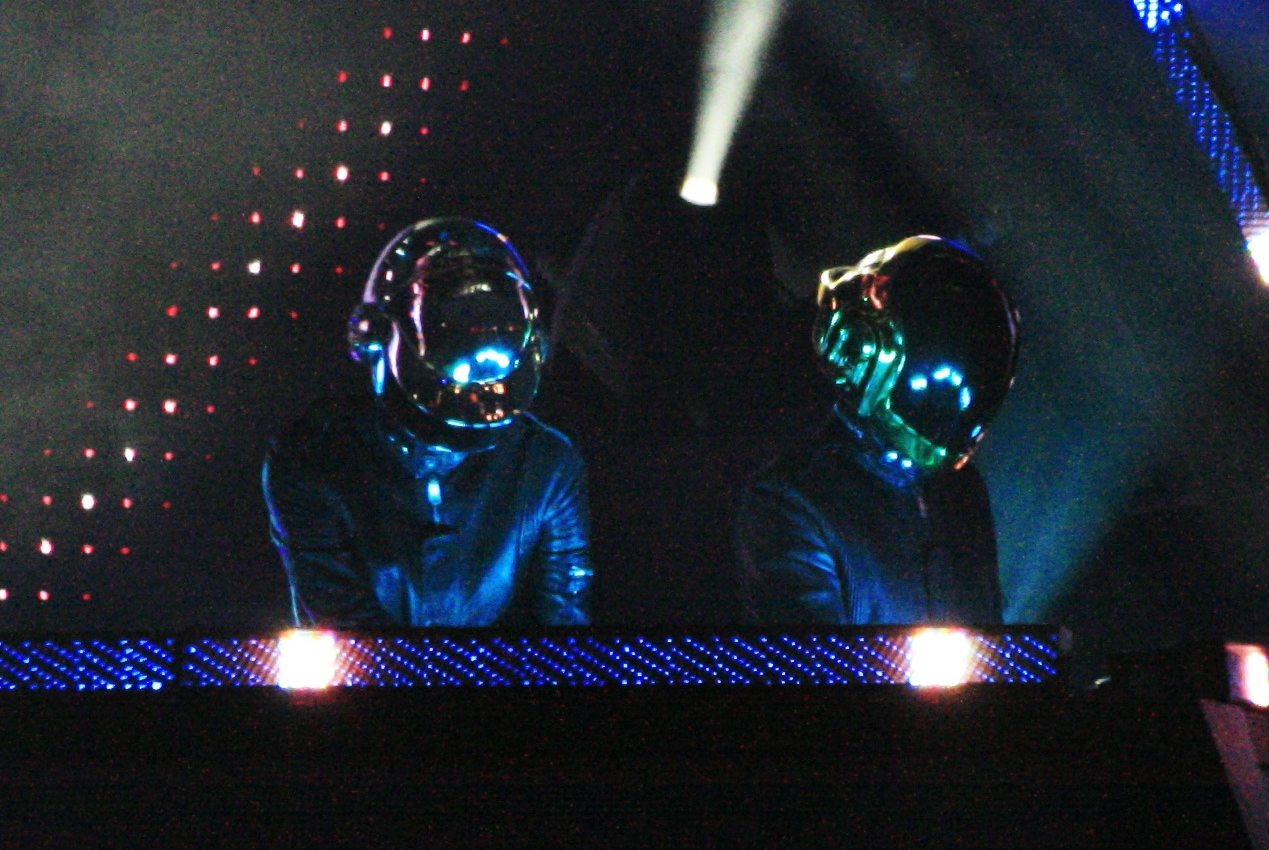
2014 winner Daft Punk

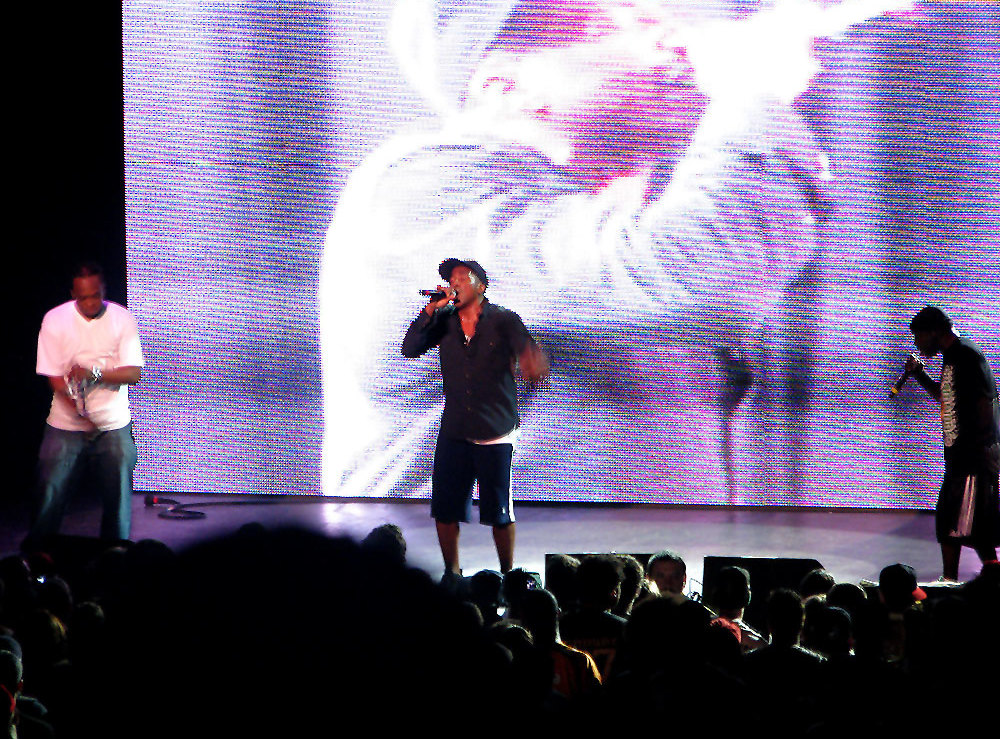
2017 winner A Tribe Called Quest

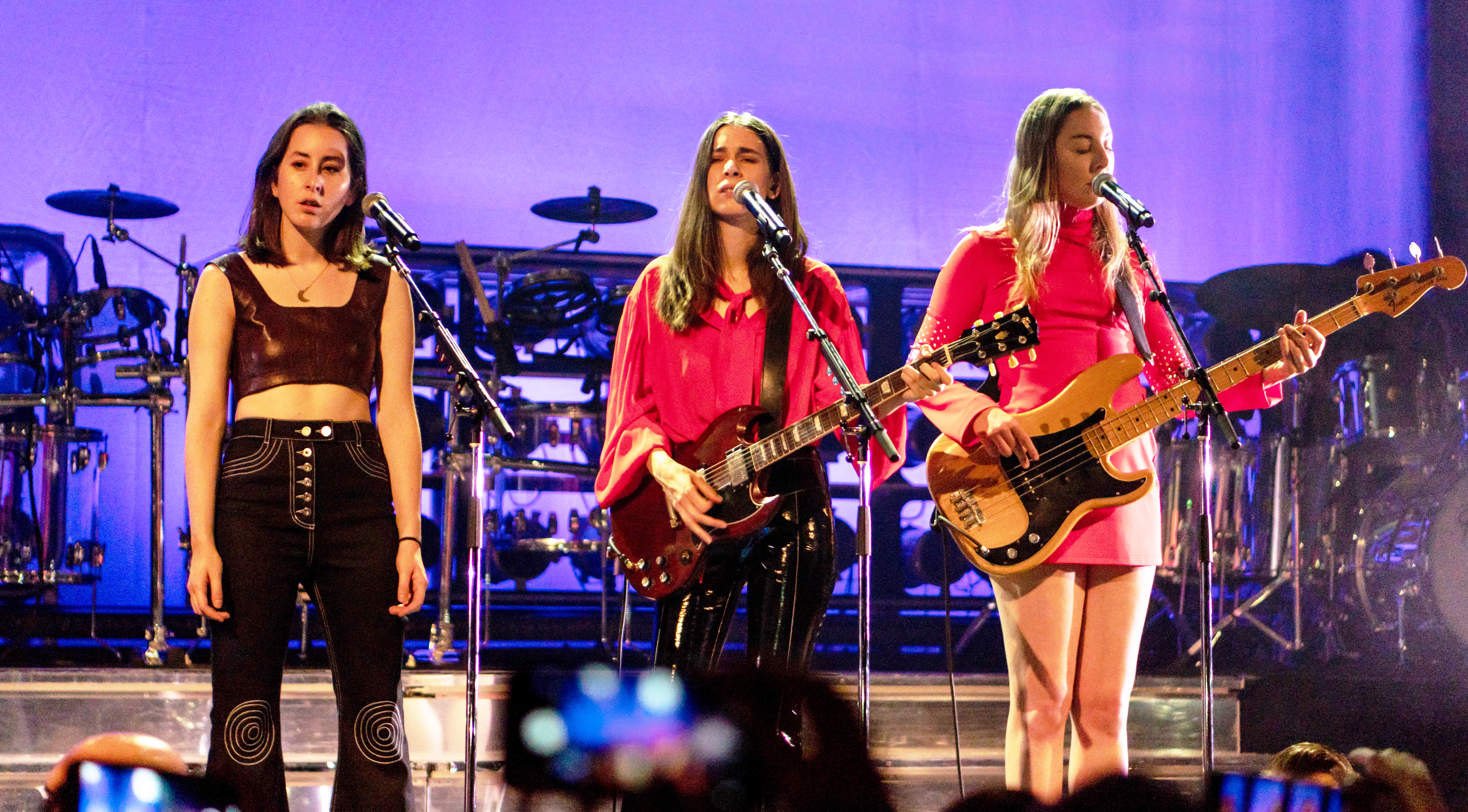
Haim received the award in 2021

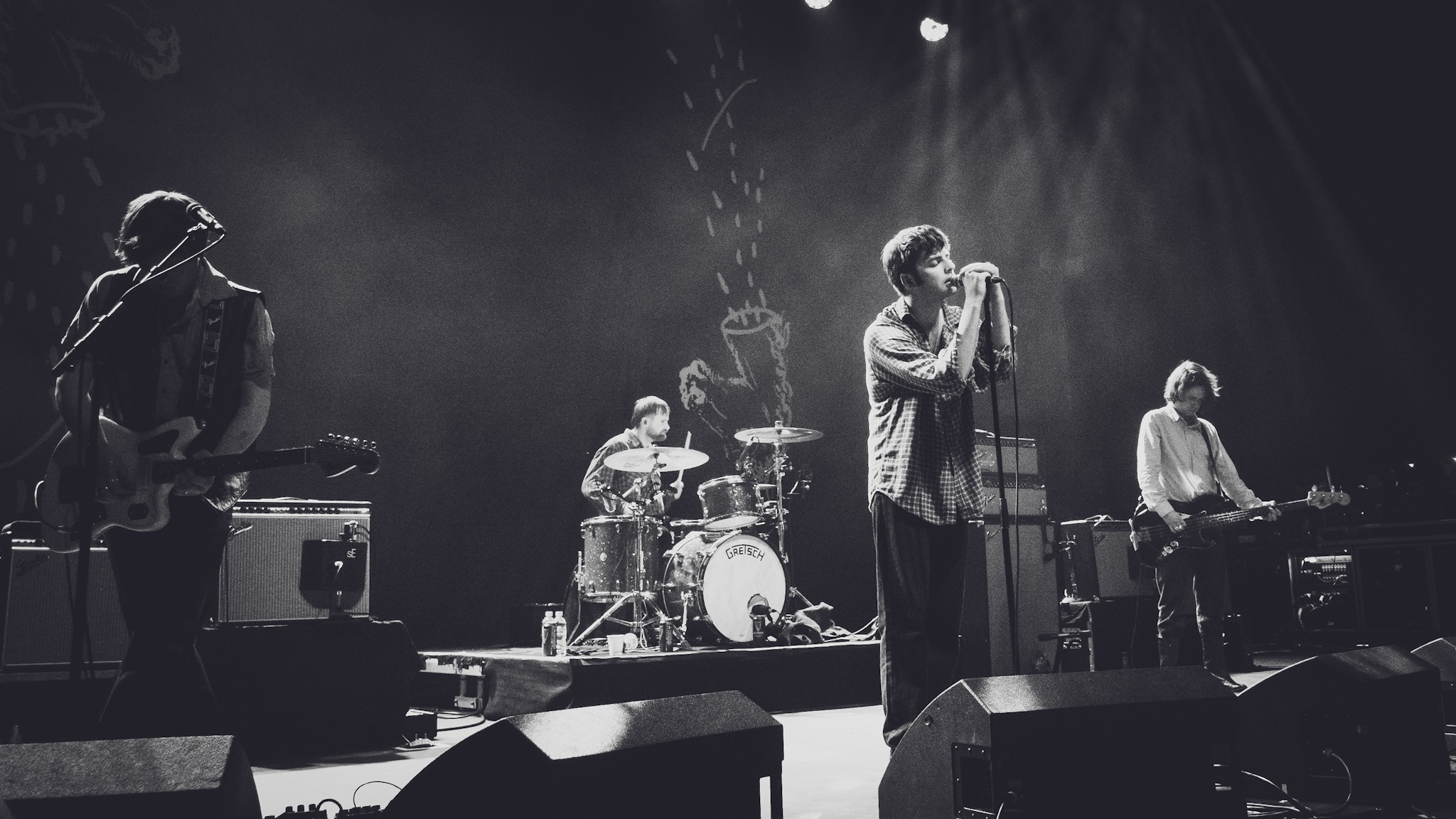
Two-time winner Fontaines D.C.

Year	Recipient	Nominee
1986	(United States) Huey Lewis and the News	(United States) The Cars; (United States) Kool & the Gang; (United States) Talking Heads; (United States) ZZ Top
1987	(United States) The Bangles	(Norway) A-ha; (United States) Bon Jovi; (United States) Cameo; (United States) Huey Lewis and the News
1988	(Republic of Ireland) U2	(United States) Bon Jovi; (United Kingdom) / (United States) Fleetwood Mac; (United States) Heart; (United States) Los Lobos
1989	(Republic of Ireland) U2	(United States) Bon Jovi; (United Kingdom) / (United States) Fleetwood Mac; (Australia) INXS; (United States) Womack & Womack
1990	(Republic of Ireland) U2	(United States) Bon Jovi; (United States) De La Soul; (United States) Guns N' Roses; (France) Gipsy Kings; (Germany) Milli Vanilli
1991	(Australia) INXS	(United States) The B-52's; (United States) De La Soul; (United States) Faith No More; (Sweden) Roxette
1992	(United States) R.E.M.	(United States) Extreme; (United States) Guns N' Roses; (Australia) INXS; (Republic of Ireland) U2
1993	(United States) R.E.M.	(Australia) / (New Zealand) Crowded House; (United States) En Vogue; (United States) Nirvana; (Republic of Ireland) U2
1994	(Australia) / (New Zealand) Crowded House	(United States) Nirvana; (United States) Pearl Jam; (United States) Spin Doctors; (Republic of Ireland) U2
1995	(United States) R.E.M.	(United States) Counting Crows; (Republic of Ireland) The Cranberries; (Canada) Crash Test Dummies; (Canada) Neil Young & (United States) Crazy Horse
1996	(United States) Bon Jovi	(United States) Foo Fighters; (United States) Garbage; (United States) Green Day; (United States) TLC
1997	(United States) Fugees	(Republic of Ireland) Boyzone; The Presidents of the United States of America; (United States) R.E.M.; (United States) The Smashing Pumpkins
1998	(Republic of Ireland) U2	(France) Daft Punk; (United States) Eels; (United States) Hanson; (United States) No Doubt
1999	(Republic of Ireland) The Corrs	(France) Air; (United States) Beastie Boys; (United States) Fun Lovin' Criminals; (United States) R.E.M.
2000	(United States) TLC	(United States) Beastie Boys; (Sweden) The Cardigans; (United States) Mercury Rev; (United States) Red Hot Chili Peppers
2001	(Republic of Ireland) U2	(Republic of Ireland) The Corrs; (United States) Santana; (Australia) Savage Garden; (Republic of Ireland) Westlife
2002	(United States) Destiny's Child	(France) Daft Punk; (United States) Limp Bizkit; (United States) R.E.M.; (United States) The Strokes
2003	(United States) Red Hot Chili Peppers	(United States) Foo Fighters; (Canada) Nickelback; (Norway) Röyksopp; (United States) The White Stripes
2004	(United States) The White Stripes	(United States) The Black Eyed Peas; (United States) Kings of Leon; (United States) Outkast; (United States) The Strokes
2005	(United States) Scissor Sisters	(United States) Green Day; (United States) Maroon 5; (United States) Outkast; (Republic of Ireland) U2
2006	(United States) Green Day	(Canada) Arcade Fire; (United States) The Black Eyed Peas; (Republic of Ireland) U2; (United States) The White Stripes
2007	(United States) The Killers	(United States) The Flaming Lips; (United States) Gnarls Barkley; (United States) Red Hot Chili Peppers; (United States) Scissor Sisters
2008	(United States) Foo Fighters	(Canada) Arcade Fire; (United States) Eagles; (United States) Kings of Leon; (United States) The White Stripes
2009	(United States) Kings of Leon	(Australia) AC/DC; (United States) Fleet Foxes; (United States) The Killers; (United States) MGMT
2010	Not Awarded	
2011	(Canada) Arcade Fire	(United States) The Black Eyed Peas; (United States) Kings of Leon; (Republic of Ireland) The Script; (United States) Vampire Weekend
2012	(United States) Foo Fighters	(United States) Fleet Foxes; (United States) Jay-Z & Kanye West; (United States) Lady Antebellum; (United States) Maroon 5
2013	(United States) The Black Keys	(United States) Alabama Shakes; (United States) Fun; (United States) The Killers; (Republic of Ireland) The Script
2014	(France) Daft Punk	(Canada) Arcade Fire; (United States) Haim; (United States) Kings of Leon; (United States) Macklemore & Ryan Lewis
2015	(United States) Foo Fighters	(Australia) 5 Seconds of Summer; (United States) The Black Keys; (Sweden) First Aid Kit; (United States) The War on Drugs
2016	(Australia) Tame Impala	(United States) Alabama Shakes; (United States) Eagles of Death Metal; (United States) Major Lazer; (Republic of Ireland) U2
2017	(United States) A Tribe Called Quest	(Canada) Drake & (United States) Future; (United States) Kings of Leon; (Australia) Nick Cave and the Bad Seeds; (United States) Twenty One Pilots
2018	(United States) Foo Fighters	(Canada) Arcade Fire; (United States) Haim; (United States) The Killers; (United States) LCD Soundsystem
2019	(United States) The Carters	(United States) Brockhampton; (United States) Chic; (Sweden) First Aid Kit; (United States) Twenty One Pilots
2020	Not Awarded	
2021	(United States) Haim	(South Korea) BTS; (Republic of Ireland) Fontaines D.C.; (United States) Foo Fighters; (United States) Run the Jewels
2022	(United States) Silk Sonic	(Sweden) ABBA; (South Korea) BTS; (Italy) Måneskin; (United States) The War on Drugs
2023	(Republic of Ireland) Fontaines D.C.	(South Korea) Blackpink; (Canada) Drake & (United Kingdom) / (United States) 21 Savage; (Sweden) First Aid Kit; (United Kingdom) / (United States) Gabriels
2024	(United States) Boygenius	(United States) Blink-182; (United States) Foo Fighters; (United Kingdom) / (United States) Gabriels; (United States) Paramore
2025	(Republic of Ireland) Fontaines D.C.	(Australia) Amyl and the Sniffers; (Australia) Confidence Man; (United States) Future and Metro Boomin; (United States) Linkin Park
2026	(United States) Geese	(United States) Haim; (Australia) Tame Impala; (United States) / (South Korea) Huntrix: Ejae, Audrey Nuna and Rei Ami; (United States) Turnstile

== Multiple nominations and awards ==
Artists that received multiple nominations
Nominations	Artist
11	(Republic of Ireland) U2
8
8	(United States) Foo Fighters
6	(United States) Kings of Leon
6	(United States) R.E.M.
5	(Canada) Arcade Fire
5	(United States) Bon Jovi
4	(United States) Haim
4	(United States) The Killers
4	(United States) The White Stripes
3	(United States) The Black Eyed Peas
3	(France) Daft Punk
3	(Sweden) First Aid Kit
3	(Republic of Ireland) Fontaines D.C.
3	(United States) Green Day
3	(Australia) INXS
3	(United States) Red Hot Chili Peppers
2	(United States) Alabama Shakes
2	(United States) Beastie Boys
2	(United States) The Black Keys
2	(South Korea) BTS
2	(Republic of Ireland) The Corrs
2	(Australia) / (New Zealand) Crowded House
2	(United States) De La Soul
2	(Canada) Drake
2	(United States) Fleet Foxes
2	(United Kingdom) / (United States) Fleetwood Mac
2	(United States) Future
2	(United Kingdom) / (United States) Gabriels
2	(United States) Guns N' Roses
2	(United States) Huey Lewis and the News
2	(United States) Maroon 5
2	(United States) Nirvana
2	(United States) Outkast
2	(United States) Scissor Sisters
2	(Republic of Ireland) The Script
2	(United States) The Strokes
2	(Australia) Tame Impala
2	(United States) TLC
2	(United States) Twenty One Pilots

Artists that received multiple awards
Awards	Artist
5	(Republic of Ireland) U2
4	(United States) Foo Fighters
3	(United States) R.E.M.
2	(Republic of Ireland) Fontaines D.C.

== Awards by country ==
Countries by wins
Country	Wins	First win	Latest win	Artist/s
United States	26	1986	2026	Huey Lewis and the News, The Bangles, R.E.M., Bon Jovi, Fugees, TLC, Destiny's Child, Red Hot Chili Peppers, The White Stripes, Scissor Sisters, Green Day, The Killers, Foo Fighters, Kings of Leon, The Black Keys, A Tribe Called Quest, The Carters, Haim, Silk Sonic, Boygenius, Geese
(Republic of Ireland) Ireland	7	1988	2025	U2, The Corrs, Fontaines D.C.
Australia	3	1991	2016	Crowded House, INXS, Tame Impala
Canada	1	2011		Arcade Fire
France	1	2014		Daft Punk
New Zealand	1	1994		Crowded House

Countries by nominations
Country	Nominations	First nomination	Latest nomination	Artist/s
United States	139	1986	2026	Majority of nominees
Ireland	21	1988	2025	U2, The Cranberries, Boyzone, The Corrs, Westlife, The Script, Fontaines D.C.
Australia	12	1989	2026	INXS, Crowded House, Savage Garden, AC/DC, 5 Seconds of Summer, Tame Impala, Nick Cave and the Bad Seeds, Amyl and the Sniffers, Confidence Man
Canada	10	1995	2023	Crash Test Dummies, Neil Young, Nickelback, Arcade Fire, Drake
Sweden	6	1991	2023	Roxette, The Cardigans, First Aid Kit, ABBA
France	5	1990	2014	Gipsy Kings, Daft Punk, Air
United Kingdom (partially)	5	1988	2024	Fleetwood Mac, 21 Savage, Gabriels
South Korea	4	2021	2026	BTS, Blackpink, Huntrix
New Zealand	2	1993	1994	Crowded House
Norway	2	1987	2003	A-ha, Röyksopp
Germany	1	1990		Milli Vanilli
Italy	1	2022		Måneskin

== Notes ==
- Scissor Sisters (2005) also won Brit Award for International Breakthrough Act
