= Angels & Queens =

Two-part debut studio album by Gabriels

- Angels & Queens – Part I cover

Studio album by Gabriels
- Released: September 30, 2022 (Part I); July 7, 2023 (Part II)
- Genre: Soul
- Length: 27:29 (Part I); 48:57 (Part II)
- Labels: Atlas Artists; Parlophone
- Producers: Ari Balouzian; Ryan Hope; Jacob Lusk; Sounwave

Gabriels chronology
Bloodline (2021)	Angels & Queens (2022)

Singles from Angels & Queens
- 1. "Angels & Queens" Released: September 7, 2022; 2. "Offering" Released: February 17, 2023; 3. "Glory" Released: June 2, 2023

Angels & Queens is the debut studio album by Compton, California soul trio Gabriels, released in two parts by Atlas Artists and Parlophone. The first part was released on September 30, 2022, and the second part was released July 7, 2023. The album was produced by the trio – vocalist Jacob Lusk and producers Ari Balouzian and Ryan Hope – and hip hop producer Sounwave, and was announced on September 7, 2022, along with the release of the title track as its lead single. The cover photograph was shot by Melodie McDaniel.

The first part of the album was critically acclaimed and placed on numerous year-end lists, including 27th on The Guardian's best albums of 2022.

== Background ==
In a press release about Part I, the band called it a "unique exploration of love and loss from each of our differing perspectives" which they "were planning to release ... next year, but got the opportunity to collaborate with some of the most amazing people who initially were strangers, but within weeks became family in the most mind blowing process. As the first part of the album was recorded, we knew we wanted to share it with you as soon as possible." Producer Sounwave said he was "instantly drawn in from the raw emotions and how limitless their range was. For this project we wanted to push the boundaries sonically that matched the intense and vulnerable feelings of each song."

== Release ==
The album was first announced on September 7, 2022, with the title track being released as its lead single the same day. The album was set for release in two parts, with the first set to release on September 30 and the second in March 2023, both by Atlas Artists and Parlophone. On December 2, the trio announced the second part's release date as April 28, but that date changed again to June 16. The latter release date came with the release of the second single, "Offering", which was simultaneously premiered on A Colors Show on February 17. "Glory" was released as a single on June 2, with the release date shifted again to July 7. A music video for "Great Wind" was released on July 11, made in collaboration with Omar Karim.

== Cover art ==
The album cover was photographed by Melodie McDaniel, and depicts Lusk receiving an outdoor baptism from his pastor Greta Knox. McDaniel and Hope are both members of Roman Coppola's organization the Directors Bureau, and Hope came to McDaniel with the baptismal concept for which she was "immediately on board." The photo was taken in a reservoir in Riverside County, California where actual baptisms are performed. McDaniel said the outdoor environment would "evoke the feelings and culture of the South". Lusk was chosen as the subject both for his role as frontman and his "strong" religious background.

== Live ==
From September 25 through October 3, Gabriels opened for Harry Styles for his residency at the Moody Center in Austin, Texas, part of Styles' Love On Tour concert tour. On October 7, the group performed at Austin City Limits Music Festival, receiving praise from the Austin American-Statesman's Earl Hopkins.

On April 14, 2023, the trio performed a 45 minute set on the Gobi Tent stage at the 2023 edition of Coachella. SFGate's Dan Gentile described the set as "perfect afternoon music" and considered them to be the best-dressed group of the day, with all three members in tuxedos and Lusk's outfit – custom-made and planned five months in advance – also including a red cape and brocade overcoat. The trio also performed at the festival's second weekend on the same stage on April 21, despite technical difficulties.

The group played Primavera Sound in Barcelona on June 2 and in Madrid on June 9, and Outside Lands Music and Arts Festival in San Francisco on August 13.

== Style and reception ==
Angels & Queens – Part I ratings
Aggregate scores
Source	Rating
Metacritic	88/100
Review scores
Source	Rating
Albumism	4.5/5 stars
AllMusic	4/5 stars
The Arts Desk	5/5 stars
The Daily Telegraph	4/5 stars
DIY	4/5 stars
The Guardian	5/5 stars
Mojo	4/5 stars

Angels & Queens – Part II ratings
Aggregate scores
Source	Rating
Metacritic	83/100
Review scores
Source	Rating
The Arts Desk	5/5 stars
Louder Than War	5/5 stars
The Daily Telegraph	4/5 stars

According to the review aggregator Metacritic, Angels & Queens – Part I received "universal acclaim" based on a weighted average score of 88 out of 100 from 5 critic scores.

The Guardian's Alexis Petridis opens his review of Part I by questioning if the project could be album of the year, calling frontman Jacob Lusk "nothing short of incredible" and the album "a powerful half-hour of top-tier songwriting that proves Gabriels are far more than soul revivalists." Petridis focuses praise on "the sound of [Lusk's] voice multitracked to infinity" on piano ballad "If You Only Knew" and the "dense funk" of that song and the title track. Producer Sounwave "helps craft a sound that feels entirely of the moment", shown through the backing instrumental of "The Blind" which "is made of a stumbling, clattering array of samples" with vocals "drenched in backwards reverb" and "the piano and strings battl[ing] for space with droning, overcast synths"; and "To the Moon and Back" which opens with orchestration which "could have transported there directly from a 1940s jazz ballad" but is "swiftly replaced by a cavernous-sounding swirl of massed vocals and an insistent, cyclical bass riff."

The Arts Desk's Peter Quinn calls the project "a collection of seven songs which take you on very different emotional journeys, with structures that take surprising twists and turns and redemptive codas that make your hair stand on end", highlighting the "monstrous snare hits, hysterical strings, forceful horn stabs and hypnotically repeating piano lines" of "Taboo" as "like what might have ensued if J Dilla had chopped up a slice of Philly soul", as well as the "horns surreptitiously sliding into the texture" of "Remember Me" and the "impressively vast wall of vocal harmonies which threatens to bring "Mama" crashing down". The Daily Telegraph's James Hall calls the album "intricately arranged and replete with daring orchestrations", saying it "somehow manages to comprise mid-paced music you can dance to and dance rhythms you can chill to." Hope and Balouzian "bring depth and nuance to every track."

Albumism's Patrick Corcoran says the album "clocks in at a sparse 27 minutes, but those minutes pack a punch far greater than you might expect." Dazed's Emmanuel Onapa calls the album "a rare exploration of love and loss through [the trio's] collective but different perspectives, melding a range of styles from classic R&B, jazz, soul and gospel filled with hope and euphoria." The Independent's Kevin EG Perry says that Lusk "channels Nina Simone and Billie Holiday as he wrings every drop of emotion from the group's songs of love and loss."

=== Year-end lists ===
Angels & Queens – Part I on year-end lists
Publication	#	Ref.
Albumism	45	
The Economist	—N/a	
God Is in the TV	43	
The Guardian	27	
Louder Than War	35	
Mojo	25	
PopMatters	17	
The Sunday Times	17	

Angels & Queens – Part 2 pn year-end lists
Publication	#	Ref.
BBC Radio 6 Music	—N/a	
Mojo	62	

== Track listing ==
All tracks are written by Ari Balouzian, Jacob Lusk, Ryan Hope, and Mark Anthony Spears with additional writers noted. All tracks produced by Balouzian, Lusk, Hope, and Sounwave.

Angels & Queens – Part I track listing
No.	Title	Writer(s)	Length
1.	"Angels & Queens"	John Anderson	3:20
2.	"Taboo"		3:10
3.	"Remember Me"		3:50
4.	"If You Only Knew"	Sam Beste	4:12
5.	"To the Moon and Back"		3:27
6.	"The Blind"		4:16
7.	"Mama"		5:14
Total length:			27:29

Angels & Queens – Part II track listing
No.	Title	Writer(s)	Length
1.	"Offering"		3:09
2.	"The Blind"		4:16
3.	"Angels & Queens"	John Anderson	3:19
4.	"Taboo"		3:09
5.	"To the Moon and Back"	Sam Beste	3:27
6.	"Professional"		4:01
7.	"We Will Remember"		3:49
8.	"Remember Me"		3:50
9.	"If You Only Knew"		4:12
10.	"Love and Hate in a Different Time"		3:48
11.	"Glory"		2:44
12.	"Great Wind"		3:59
13.	"Mama"		5:14
Total length:			48:57

== Personnel ==
=== Part I ===
- Jacob Lusk – vocals
- Ari Balouzian – piano, synthesizer, violin, viola, cello, string arrangement
- Sounwave – drum programming, timpani
- Sam Beste – additional production, piano, synthesizer
- Matt Schaeffer – drums, guitar
- Trevor Estes – drums, percussion
- John Anderson – engineer, guitar, bass
- Malik Taylor – French horn
- Max Whipple – horns arrangement, bass
- Fabio Santana De Souza and Garret Smith – trombone
- Todd M. Simon – trumpet, flugelhorn
- P. Blake Cooper – tuba
- Neil Charles – bass
- Anthony Patler – organ, synthesizer, bass
- Isaiah Gage – cello
- Rico Nichols – drums
- Mike Haldemann – guitar
- George Janho, Richard Woodcraft, and Ryan Nasci – engineers
- Beach Noise – mixing engineer
- Matt Colton and Mike Hillier – mastering engineers

== Charts ==
Chart performance for Angels & Queens – Pt 1
Chart (2022–2023)	Peak position
Scottish Albums (Official Charts)	4
UK Albums (Official Charts)	25

Chart performance for Angels & Queens – Pt 2
Chart (2023)	Peak position
Belgian Albums (Ultratop Flanders)	14
Belgian Albums (Ultratop Wallonia)	157
Dutch Albums (Album Top 100)	37
Hungarian Albums (MAHASZ)	29
UK Albums (Official Charts)	3
UK R&B Albums (Official Charts)	1
