= Jacob Lusk =

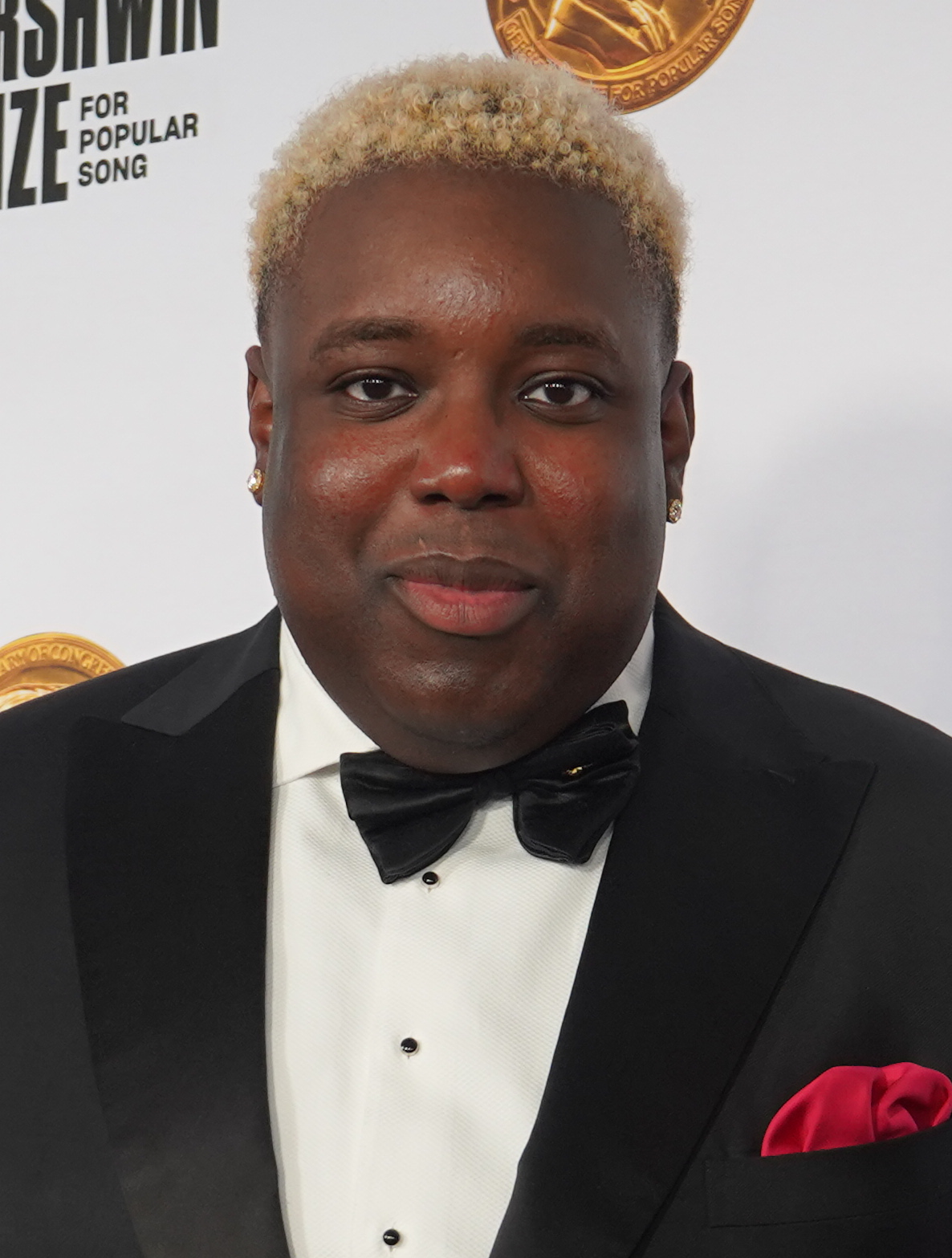
- Lusk in 2024

Background information
- Born: 1987/1988 (age 38–39)
- Origin: Compton, California, US
- Genres: R&B, gospel, pop
- Occupation: Singer
- Instruments: Vocals, drums
- Years active: 2011–present
- Website: jacoblusk.com

Jacob Lusk (born 1987/1988) is an American singer from Compton, California, who finished in fifth place on the tenth season of American Idol. He was also a member of Gabriels.

== Early life ==
Lusk was born to Anglia and Gregory Lusk, and is from Compton, California. His father worked as a music producer, but he died when Lusk was twelve. Lusk began singing when he was four years old, and performed at his church from the age of five. He attended United Faith Community School in Long Beach, California, and was the lead singer in the school choir, plays and programs.

He is a minister of music at his church. Prior to American Idol, he worked as a spa concierge. In 2007, he joined a gospel group called InNate Praise formed by the late hip-hop singer Nate Dogg, and he performed with the group at churches around Los Angeles County.

He was arrested in November 2010 for missing a court hearing after being cited for riding on an L.A. metro train without buying a ticket, and spent three days in jail. He was also initially sentenced to two years probation but was reprieved after pleading to the judge that the sentence would jeopardize his chance of appearing on American Idol.

His musical influences include his father Gregory Lusk, Billie Holiday, Luther Vandross, Gladys Knight, Whitney Houston, Chaka Khan, James Moore, and BeBe and CeCe Winans.

== American Idol ==
=== Overview ===
Lusk auditioned for the tenth season of American Idol in Los Angeles, California.

Lusk was first shown in the group stage of the competition where he performed with fellow finalist Naima Adedapo, Vegas Contestant Sophia Shorai, and Matthew Nuss, and Da'Quela Payne. all advanced to the top 102

He received high praise from Randy Jackson for his performance of "God Bless the Child" during the Hollywood rounds as the best ever seen on Idol. He was one of the top five males in the semi-final round, and therefore advanced to the Top 13. Lusk was eliminated on May 5, 2011, finishing in fifth place. During the finale, he performed with Kirk Franklin and Gladys Knight.

=== Performances/Results ===
Episode	Theme	Song choice	Original artist	Order #	Result
Audition	Auditioner's Choice	"Papa Was a Rollin' Stone"	The Undisputed Truth	N/A	Advanced
Audition	Auditioner's Choice	"A Change Is Gonna Come"	Sam Cooke	N/A	Advanced
Hollywood Round, Part 1	First Solo	N/A	N/A	N/A	Advanced
Hollywood Round, Part 2	Group Performance	"Get Ready"	The Temptations	N/A	Advanced
Hollywood Round, Part 3	Second Solo	"God Bless the Child"	Billie Holiday	N/A	Advanced
Las Vegas Round	Songs of The Beatles; Group Performance	"The Long and Winding Road"	The Beatles	N/A	Advanced
Hollywood Round Final	Final Solo	"A Song for You"	Leon Russell	N/A	Advanced
Top 24 (12 Men)	Personal Choice	"A House Is Not a Home"	Brook Benton	11	Advanced
Top 13	Your Personal Idol	"I Believe I Can Fly"	R. Kelly	8	Safe
Top 12	Year You Were Born	"Alone"	i-TEN	12	Safe
Top 11	Motown	"You're All I Need to Get By"	Marvin Gaye & Tammi Terrell	3	Safe
Top 11^{1}	Elton John	"Sorry Seems to Be the Hardest Word"	Elton John	10	Safe
Top 9	Rock & Roll Hall of Fame	"Man in the Mirror"	Michael Jackson	1	Bottom 3^{2}
Top 8	Songs from the Movies	"Bridge over Troubled Water" — The Pursuit of Happyness	Simon & Garfunkel	7	Safe
Top 7	Songs from the 21st Century	"Dance with My Father"	Luther Vandross	4	Bottom 3^{3}
Top 6	Carole King	Solo "Oh No Not My Baby"	Maxine Brown	1	Safe
Top 6	Carole King	Duet "I'm into Something Good" with James Durbin	Earl-Jean McCrea	9	Safe
Top 5	Songs from Now and Then	"No Air"	Jordin Sparks & Chris Brown	2	Eliminated
Top 5	Songs from Now and Then	"Love Hurts"	The Everly Brothers	7	Eliminated

- ^Note 1 Due to the judges using their one save to save Casey Abrams, the Top 11 remained intact for another week, when two contestants were eliminated.
- ^Note 2 Lusk was saved first from elimination, before Stefano Langone as Pia Toscano was eliminated.
- ^Note 3 When Ryan Seacrest announced the results for this particular night, Lusk was among the Bottom 3 but declared safe second, as Stefano Langone was eliminated.

== Post-Idol ==
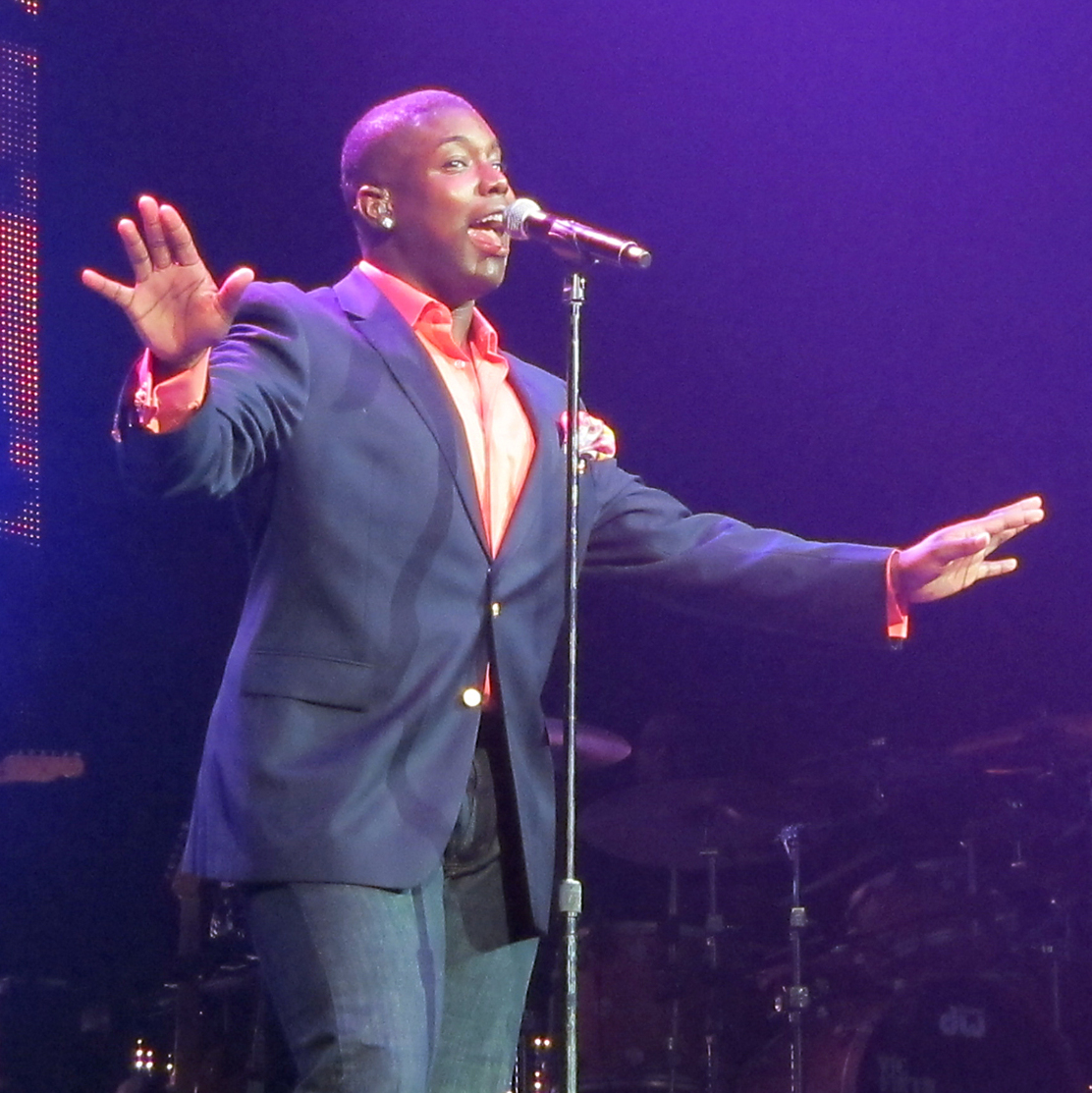

Lusk and the rest of the top 11 took part in the American Idols Live! Tour 2011, which began in West Valley City, Utah, on July 6, 2011, and ended in Manila, Philippines on September 20, 2011. He performed on Live with Regis and Kelly on May 9, 2011, and on the Today show on May 10, 2011. In 2016, he formed Gabriels with Ari Balouzian and Ryan Hope.

On June 25, 2023, he performed "Are You Ready for Love" alongside Elton John at John's headline performance at the Glastonbury Festival. In October 2023, Lusk won The Breakthrough Award in the 2023 Virgin Atlantic Attitude Awards.

On Wednesday, March 20, 2024, Lusk performed at the all-star tribute concert for the Library of Congress Gershwin Prize for Popular Song saluting singer and LGBTQ+ advocate Elton John and his songwriting partner Bernie Taupin.

On Friday, April 10, 2026 and Friday, April 17, 2026, Lusk performed at the 2026 Coachella Valley Music and Arts Festival with Moby.

== Personal life ==
Lusk identifies as queer. Of his time on American Idol, he says "Even though I wasn't out, I was pretty, pretty flaming."
