= List of UK R&B Singles Chart number ones of 2023 =

The logo of the Official Charts Company, responsible for compiling all of the official music charts in the United Kingdom, including the R&B singles chart.

The UK R&B Singles Chart is a weekly chart that ranks the 40 biggest-selling singles and albums that are classified in the R&B genre in the United Kingdom. The chart is compiled by the Official Charts Company, and is based on both physical, and digital sales.

The following are the songs which have topped the UK R&B Singles Chart in 2023.

== Number-one singles ==
| Chart date (week ending) | Song | Artist(s) | Record label | References |
|---|---|---|---|---|
| 5 January ^{[b]} | "Firebabe" | Stormzy | 0207/Merky | |
| 12 January | "Kill Bill" | SZA | RCA/Top Dawg | |
| 19 January | "Kill Bill" | SZA | RCA/Top Dawg | |
| 26 January | "Kill Bill" | SZA | RCA/Top Dawg | |
| 2 February | "Kill Bill" | SZA | RCA/Top Dawg | |
| 9 February | "Kill Bill" | SZA | RCA/Top Dawg | |
| 16 February | "Kill Bill" | SZA | RCA/Top Dawg | |
| 23 February | "Kill Bill" | SZA | RCA/Top Dawg | |
| 2 March | "Kill Bill" | SZA | RCA/Top Dawg | |
| 9 March | "Kill Bill" | SZA | RCA/Top Dawg | |
| 16 March | "Die for You" | The Weeknd | Republic/XO | |
| 23 March | "Die for You" | The Weeknd | Republic/XO | |
| 30 March | "Die for You" | The Weeknd | Republic/XO | |
| 6 April | "People" | Libianca | 5K | |
| 13 April | "People" | Libianca | 5K | |
| 20 April | "People" | Libianca | 5K | |
| 27 April | "People" | Libianca | 5K | |
| 4 May | "People" | Libianca | 5K | |
| 11 May | "People" | Libianca | 5K | |
| 18 May | "People" | Libianca | 5K | |
| 25 May | "People" | Libianca | 5K | |
| 1 June | "People" | Libianca | 5K | |
| 8 June | "Calm Down" | Rema | Mavin | |
| 15 June ^{[a]} | "Sprinter" | Dave and Central Cee | Live Yours/Neighbourhood | |
| 22 June ^{[a]} | "Sprinter" | Dave and Central Cee | Live Yours/Neighbourhood | |
| 29 June ^{[a]} | "Sprinter" | Dave and Central Cee | Live Yours/Neighbourhood | |
| 6 July ^{[a]} | "Sprinter" | Dave and Central Cee | Live Yours/Neighbourhood | |
| 13 July ^{[a]} | "Sprinter" | Dave and Central Cee | Live Yours/Neighbourhood | |
| 20 July ^{[a]} | "Sprinter" | Dave and Central Cee | Live Yours/Neighbourhood | |
| 27 July ^{[a]} | "Sprinter" | Dave and Central Cee | Live Yours/Neighbourhood | |
| 3 August ^{[a]} | "Sprinter" | Dave and Central Cee | Live Yours/Neighbourhood | |
| 10 August ^{[a]} | "Sprinter" | Dave and Central Cee | Live Yours/Neighbourhood | |
| 17 August ^{[a]} | "Sprinter" | Dave and Central Cee | Live Yours/Neighbourhood | |
| 24 August | "Sprinter" | Dave and Central Cee | Live Yours/Neighbourhood | |
| 31 August | "Sprinter" | Dave and Central Cee | Live Yours/Neighbourhood | |
| 7 September | "Paint the Town Red" | Doja Cat | RCA | |
| 14 September ^{[a]} | "Paint the Town Red" | Doja Cat | RCA | |
| 21 September ^{[a]} | "Paint the Town Red" | Doja Cat | RCA | |
| 28 September ^{[a]} | "Paint the Town Red" | Doja Cat | RCA | |
| 5 October ^{[a]} | "Paint the Town Red" | Doja Cat | RCA | |
| 12 October ^{[a]} | "Paint the Town Red" | Doja Cat | RCA | |
| 19 October | "Paint the Town Red" | Doja Cat | RCA | |
| 26 October | "Paint the Town Red" | Doja Cat | RCA | |
| 2 November | "Water" | Tyla | Epic/FAX | |
| 9 November | "Water" | Tyla | Epic/FAX | |
| 16 November | "Water" | Tyla | Epic/FAX | |
| 23 November ^{[a]} | "Lovin on Me" | Jack Harlow | Atlantic | |
| 30 November ^{[a]} | "Lovin on Me" | Jack Harlow | Atlantic | |
| 7 December ^{[a]} | "Lovin on Me" | Jack Harlow | Atlantic | |
| 14 December | "Lovin on Me" | Jack Harlow | Atlantic | |
| 21 December | "Lovin on Me" | Jack Harlow | Atlantic | |
| 28 December | "Lovin on Me" | Jack Harlow | Atlantic | |

== Notes ==
- ^{a} - The single was simultaneously number one on the UK Singles Chart.
- ^{b} - The artist was simultaneously number one on the R&B Albums Chart.

== See also ==
- List of UK Singles Chart number ones of 2023
- List of UK R&B Albums Chart number ones of 2023
- List of UK Dance Singles Chart number ones of 2023
