= Gabriels (band) =

British-American band

- Origin: Los Angeles
- Genres: Gospel; doo-wop; jazz; R&B; soul
- Years active: 2016–present
- Labels: Atlas Artists; Elektra; Parlophone
- Members: Ryan Hope; Ari Balouzian
- Past members: Jacob Lusk
- Website: gabrielsofficial.com

Gabriels are a British-American musical duo consisting of Ryan Hope and Ari Balouzian. The band formed after meeting in Los Angeles in 2016. They were nominated for BBC Radio 1's Sound of... for 2023.

== Formation ==
Hope and Balouzian were working together on a film in 2016 and were searching for a choir for the soundtrack when they came across the work of Lusk. Lusk had previously appeared on American Idol in 2011 and sang backing for Diana Ross and Gladys Knight but they hadn’t seen this; at the time Lusk was orchestrating an amateur choir. They asked him to come to Hope's music studio in Palm Springs to make more music and when he declined, they instead camped outside Lusk’s church with a remote recording studio.

The band is named after St. Gabriels Avenue, the street in Sunderland, England that Hope grew up on. Together they are said to fuse musical styles such as gospel, doo-wop and jazz.

== Career ==
Gabriels debut EP Love and Hate in a Different Time, released in June 2021, was called "one of the most seminal records I've heard in the past 10 years" by Elton John. Their second EP Blame was released in November 2021. In August 2021 they signed with major labels Elektra in the U.S. and Parlophone in the U.K. In the spring of 2022 the band toured with Celeste. In June 2022 they played at Glastonbury Festival. The first part of their debut album Angels & Queens was released in 2022 and was described in The Independent as 'beguiling' and having "real emotional depth". The Guardian review asked "could this be the album of the year?" The second part followed on July 7, 2023.

At the 2023 Brit Awards the band were nominated in the International group of the year category.

Gabriels performed at the 22nd Coachella Valley Music and Arts Festival in April 2023. Lusk departed the band in 2024.

== Discography ==
=== Studio albums ===
List of studio albums, with selected details and chart positions
Title	Details	Peak chart positions	
Title	Details	SCO	UK
Angels & Queens – Part I	Released: September 30, 2022; Label: Atlas Artists; Formats: CD, LP, digital	8	25
Angels & Queens – Part II	Released: July 7, 2023; Label: Atlas Artists; Formats: CD, LP, digital	—	3
