= List of UK Rock & Metal Albums Chart number ones of 2023 =

The UK Rock & Metal Albums Chart is a record chart which ranks the best-selling rock and heavy metal albums in the United Kingdom. Compiled and published by the Official Charts Company, the data is based on each album's weekly physical sales and digital downloads.

== Chart history ==
Issue date	Album	Artist(s)	Record label(s)	Ref.
6 January	The Dark Side of the Moon	Pink Floyd	Rhino	
13 January	The Dark Side of the Moon	Pink Floyd	Rhino	
20 January	The Dark Side of the Moon	Pink Floyd	Rhino	
27 January	Wrong Side of Paradise	Black Star Riders	Earache	
3 February	Chaos & Colour	Uriah Heep	Silver Lining Music	
10 February	The Dark Side of the Moon	Pink Floyd	Rhino	
17 February	Truth Decay	You Me at Six	Underdog	
24 February	Inhale/Exhale	Those Damn Crows	Earache	
3 March	Love	The Cult	Beggars Banquet	
10 March	BBC Broadcasts	Genesis	UMR/Virgin	
17 March	The Dark Side of the Moon	Pink Floyd	Rhino	
24 March	Sundowners	The Answer	7 Hz Productions	
31 March	So Much (for) Stardust	Fall Out Boy	Parlophone	
7 April	The Seventh Sun	Bury Tomorrow	Music For Nations	
14 April	Meteora	Linkin Park	Warner	
21 April	72 Seasons	Metallica	Vertigo	
28 April	A Kiss for the Whole World	Enter Shikari	SO Recordings	
5 May	Darkadelic	Damned	Ear Music	
12 May	Hard Cold Fire	Therapy	Marshall	
19 May	72 Seasons	Metallica	Vertigo	
26 May	Drastic Symphonies	Def Leppard and Royal Philharmonic Orchestra	Mercury	
2 June	Tubular Bells	Mike Oldfield	UMR/Virgin	
9 June	But Here We Are	Foo Fighters	Columbia	
16 June	But Here We Are	Foo Fighters	Columbia	
23 June	In Times New Roman...	Queens of the Stone Age	Matador	
30 June	But Here We Are	Foo Fighters	Columbia	
7 July	In Times New Roman...	Queens of the Stone Age	Matador	
14 July	Loco Paradise	The Dust Coda	Earache	
21 July	Evergreen	Pvris	Hopeless	
28 July	Join the Club	As December Falls	ADF	
4 August	WTFortyfive?	Girlschool	Silver Lining Music	
11 August	Smile	Skindred	Earache	
18 August	Smile	Skindred	Earache	
25 August	Greatest Hits	Aerosmith	Universal	
1 September	Road	Alice Cooper	EarMusic	
8 September	Back to the Water Below	Royal Blood	Warner	
15 September	Back to the Water Below	Royal Blood	Warner	
22 September	CMF2	Corey Taylor	BMG	
29 September	Chaos Horrific	Cannibal Corpse	Metal Blade	
6 October	The Harmony Codex	Steven Wilson	SW Records	
13 October	The Dark Side of the Moon Redux	Roger Waters	Cooking Vinyl	
20 October	The Dark Side of the Moon	Pink Floyd	Rhino	
27 October	One More Time...	Blink-182	Columbia	
3 November	One More Time...	Blink-182	Columbia	
10 November	This Heathen Land	Green Lung	Nuclear Blast	
17 November	The Dark Side of the Moon	Pink Floyd	Rhino	
24 November	Fallen	Evanescence	EMI	
1 December	The Dark Side of the Moon	Pink Floyd	Rhino	
8 December	The Dark Side of the Moon	Pink Floyd	Rhino	
15 December	Closure/Continuation. Live.	Porcupine Tree	Kscope	
22 December	The Dark Side of the Moon	Pink Floyd	Rhino	
29 December	The Dark Side of the Moon	Pink Floyd	Rhino	

== See also ==
- List of UK Rock & Metal Singles Chart number ones of 2023
