= List of UK Rock & Metal Singles Chart number ones of 2023 =

The UK Rock & Metal Singles Chart is a record chart which ranks the best-selling rock and heavy metal songs in the United Kingdom. Compiled and published by the Official Charts Company, the data is based on each track's weekly physical sales and digital downloads. The first number one of the year was "Don't Stop Me Now" by Queen.

== Chart history ==
Issue date	Single	Artist(s)	Record label(s)	Ref.
6 January	"Don't Stop Me Now"	Queen	Island	
13 January	"Iris"	Goo Goo Dolls	Warner	
20 January	"Iris"	Goo Goo Dolls	Warner	
27 January	"Iris"	Goo Goo Dolls	Warner	
3 February	"Iris"	Goo Goo Dolls	Warner	
10 February	"Iris"	Goo Goo Dolls	Warner	
17 February	"Lost"	Linkin Park	Warner	
24 February	"Iris"	Goo Goo Dolls	Warner	
3 March	"Iris"	Goo Goo Dolls	Warner	
10 March	"Iris"	Goo Goo Dolls	Warner	
17 March	"Iris"	Goo Goo Dolls	Warner	
24 March	"Iris"	Goo Goo Dolls	Warner	
31 March	"Iris"	Goo Goo Dolls	Warner	
7 April	"Iris"	Goo Goo Dolls	Warner	
14 April	"Iris"	Goo Goo Dolls	Warner	
21 April	"Iris"	Goo Goo Dolls	Warner	
28 April	"Iris"	Goo Goo Dolls	Warner	
5 May	"Iris"	Goo Goo Dolls	Warner	
12 May	"Lost"	Bring Me the Horizon	RCA	
19 May	"Iris"	Goo Goo Dolls	Warner	
26 May	"Iris"	Goo Goo Dolls	Warner	
2 June	"Iris"	Goo Goo Dolls	Warner	
9 June	"Iris"	Goo Goo Dolls	Warner	
16 June	"Iris"	Goo Goo Dolls	Warner	
23 June	"Iris"	Goo Goo Dolls	Warner	
30 June	"Sweet Child o' Mine"	Guns N' Roses	Geffen	
7 July	"Sweet Child o' Mine"	Guns N' Roses	Geffen	
14 July	"Iris"	Goo Goo Dolls	Warner	
21 July	"Iris"	Goo Goo Dolls	Warner	
28 July	"Iris"	Goo Goo Dolls	Warner	
4 August	"Iris"	Goo Goo Dolls	Warner	
11 August	"Iris"	Goo Goo Dolls	Warner	
18 August	"Iris"	Goo Goo Dolls	Warner	
25 August	"Iris"	Goo Goo Dolls	Warner	
1 September	"Iris"	Goo Goo Dolls	Warner	
8 September	"Iris"	Goo Goo Dolls	Warner	
15 September	"Iris"	Goo Goo Dolls	Warner	
22 September	"Iris"	Goo Goo Dolls	Warner	
29 September	"Iris"	Goo Goo Dolls	Warner	
6 October	"Iris"	Goo Goo Dolls	Warner	
13 October	"Iris"	Goo Goo Dolls	Warner	
20 October	"Iris"	Goo Goo Dolls	Warner	
27 October	"Iris"	Goo Goo Dolls	Warner	
3 November	"Iris"	Goo Goo Dolls	Warner	
10 November	"Iris"	Goo Goo Dolls	Warner	
17 November	"Iris"	Goo Goo Dolls	Warner	
24 November	"Iris"	Goo Goo Dolls	Warner	
1 December	"Iris"	Goo Goo Dolls	Warner	
8 December	"Iris"	Goo Goo Dolls	Warner	
15 December	"Iris"	Goo Goo Dolls	Warner	
22 December	"Iris"	Goo Goo Dolls	Warner	
29 December	"Iris"	Goo Goo Dolls	Warner	

== See also ==
- List of UK Rock & Metal Albums Chart number ones of 2023
