= Noel Gallagher's High Flying Birds discography =

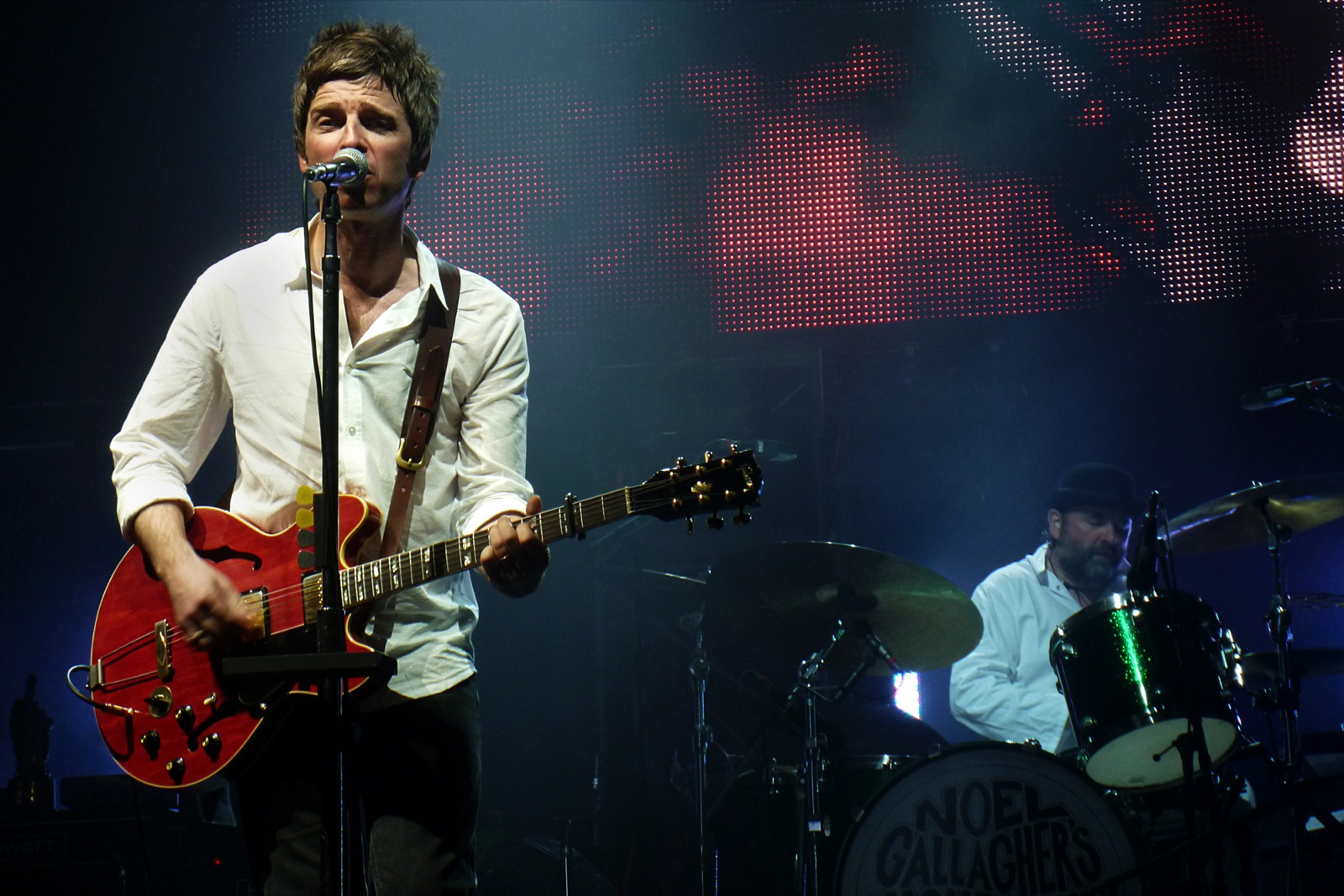
- Noel Gallagher and Jeremy Stacey of Noel Gallagher's High Flying Birds in 2012
- Studio albums: 4
- Extended plays: 4
- Compilation albums: 1
- Singles: 21
- Video albums: 1
- Music videos: 21
- Box sets: 1

The English rock band Noel Gallagher's High Flying Birds have released four studio albums, one compilation album, four extended plays (EPs), one box set, twenty-one singles and thirteen music videos. Originally formed by eponymous frontman Noel Gallagher in 2010 following his departure from Oasis, the band released their self-titled debut album in October 2011. It topped the UK Albums Chart and has since sold over 820,000 copies in the UK. Noel Gallagher's High Flying Birds was supported by five singles, two of which reached the top 20 of the UK singles chart. B-sides from the first four of these were released in April 2012 as Songs from the Great White North...

A year after the release of their debut album, Noel Gallagher's High Flying Birds released the live video album International Magic Live at the O2, which documented the band's performance at The O2 Arena in February 2012. The album topped the UK Music Video Chart. The follow-up to the band's self-titled debut, Chasing Yesterday, was released in February 2015. The release once again topped the UK Albums Chart. The lead single from the album, "In the Heat of the Moment", reached number 26 on the UK singles chart, although later single releases have reached lower positions on the chart.

== Albums ==
=== Studio albums ===
List of studio albums with selected chart positions, sales figures and certifications
Title	Details	Peak chart positions										Sales	Certifications
Title	Details	UK	AUS	FRA	GER	IRL	ITA	JPN	NED	SWI	US	Sales	Certifications
Noel Gallagher's High Flying Birds	Released: 17 October 2011; Label: Sour Mash (JDNC10); Formats: CD, CD+DVD, DL, LP	1	16	9	11	1	2	5	11	10	28	World: 2,500,000; UK: 900,000; US: 61,000	BPI: 3× Platinum
Chasing Yesterday	Released: 25 February 2015; Label: Sour Mash (JDNC18); Formats: CD, DL, LP	1	8	15	5	1	5	10	8	4	35	UK: 340,742	BPI: Platinum
Who Built the Moon?	Released: 24 November 2017; Label: Sour Mash; Formats: CD, DL, LP	1	18	37	17	2	12	7	21	9	48	UK: 300,000	BPI: Platinum
Council Skies	Released: 2 June 2023; Label: Sour Mash; Formats: CD, DL, LP	2	72	28	8	2	18	10	24	11	— (Note: Council Skies did not enter the US Billboard 200, but peaked at number 20 on the US Billboard Album Sales Chart.)	UK: 97,000	BPI: Gold

=== Compilation albums ===
List of compilation albums, with selected chart positions
Title	Details	Peak chart positions										Sales	Certifications
Title	Details	UK	AUS	FRA	GER	IRL	ITA	JPN	NED	SCO	SWI	Sales	Certifications
Back the Way We Came: Vol. 1 (2011–2021)	Released: 11 June 2021; Label: Sour Mash; Formats: CD, DL, LP	1	51	164	12	2	48	14	32	1	14	UK: 100,000	BPI: Gold

=== Box sets ===
List of box sets
Title	Details
Singles Box	Released: 1 September 2012; Label: Sour Mash (JDNCSBOX); Formats: 5CD, 3x7" vinyl+2x12" vinyl

== Extended plays ==
List of extended plays with selected chart positions
Title	Details	Peak chart positions								
Title	Details	UK	UK Down.	UK Indie	UK Phys.	UK Rec.	UK Sales	UK Vinyl	IRL	SCO
Songs from the Great White North...	Released: 21 April 2012; Label: Sour Mash (JDNC #14); Format: 12" vinyl	—	—	—	—	—	—	—	—	—
iTunes Festival: London 2012	Released: 21 September 2012; Label: Sour Mash; Format: DL	127	44	19	—	—	—	—	—	—
Together Live! (split with Snow Patrol and Jake Bugg)	Released: 3 November 2012; Label: Self-released; Format: DL	—	—	—	—	—	—	—	—	—
Where the City Meets the Sky – Chasing Yesterday: The Remixes	Released: 25 September 2015; Label: Sour Mash; Formats: DL, LP, CD	35	—	8	24	26	30	1	57	23
Wait and Return	Released: 1 March 2019; Label: Sour Mash; Formats: 12" vinyl, download, streaming	—	—	—	—	—	—	—	—	—
Black Star Dancing	Released: 14 June 2019; Label: Sour Mash; Formats: 12" vinyl, download, streaming	—	—	—	—	—	—	—	—	—
This Is the Place	Released: 27 September 2019; Label: Sour Mash; Formats: 12" vinyl, download, streaming	—	—	—	—	—	—	—	—	—
Blue Moon Rising	Released: 6 March 2020; Label: Sour Mash; Formats: 12" vinyl, download, streaming	—	—	—	—	—	—	—	—	—
Magic Secrets 2022	Released: 23 April 2022; Label: Sour Mash; Formats: 7" vinyl, download, streaming	—	—	—	—	—	—	—	—	—
Abbey Road Sessions	Released: 12 December 2023; Label: Sour Mash; Formats: download, streaming	—	—	—	—	—	—	—	—	—
"—" denotes a recording that did not chart or was not released in that territory.

== Singles ==
List of singles with selected chart positions and certifications, showing year released and album name
Title	Year	Peak chart positions										Certifications	Album
Title	Year	UK	BEL (FL)	BEL (WA)	FRA	GER	IRL	JPN	POL	SCO	US Rock	Certifications	Album
"The Death of You and Me"	2011	15	65	74	—	—	35	72	43	10	—	BPI: Silver	Noel Gallagher's High Flying Birds
"AKA... What a Life!"	2011	20	70	83	—	—	—	49	—	15	—	BPI: Platinum	Noel Gallagher's High Flying Birds
"If I Had a Gun..."	2011	95	81	—	—	94	—	2	—	98	46	BPI: Platinum	Noel Gallagher's High Flying Birds
"Dream On"	2012	52	72	—	—	—	—	17	—	39	—		Noel Gallagher's High Flying Birds
"Everybody's on the Run"	2012	61	80	—	—	—	—	97	—	49	—		Noel Gallagher's High Flying Birds
"In the Heat of the Moment"	2014	26	62	—	185	—	71	94	—	14	—	BPI: Gold	Chasing Yesterday
"The Dying of the Light" (demo)	2015	— (Note: "The Dying of the Light" (demo) did not enter the UK singles chart, but peaked at number 81 on the UK Singles Sales Chart.)	—	—	—	—	—	—	—	64	—		Non-album single
"Ballad of the Mighty I"	2015	54	54	79	—	—	42	32	61	32	—	BPI: Silver	Chasing Yesterday
"Riverman"	2015	70	83	86	—	—	—	—	—	38	—		Chasing Yesterday
"Lock All the Doors"	2015	184	— (Note: "Lock All the Doors" did not enter the Flanders Ultratop 50, but charted as an "extra tip" on the Flanders Ultratip chart.)	—	—	—	—	—	—	47	—		Chasing Yesterday
"The Dying of the Light"	2015	187	117	— (Note: "The Dying of the Light" did not enter the Wallonie Ultratop 50, but charted as an "extra tip" on the Wallonie Ultratip chart.)	—	—	—	—	—	32	—	BPI: Silver	Chasing Yesterday
"El Mexicano" (The Reflex 'La Revolución' Remixes)	2016	— (Note: "El Mexicano" did not enter the UK singles chart, but peaked at number 4 on the Official Physical Singles Sales Chart Top 100.)	—	—	—	—	—	—	—	—	—		Non-album single
"Holy Mountain"	2017	31	— (Note: "Holy Mountain" did not enter the Flanders Ultratop 50, but charted as an "extra tip" on the Flanders Ultratip chart.)	— (Note: "Holy Mountain" did not enter the Wallonie Ultratop 50, but charted as an "extra tip" on the Wallonie Ultratip chart.)	133	—	—	77	—	10	—	BPI: Silver	Who Built the Moon?
"It's a Beautiful World"	2017	77	—	84	—	—	—	—	—	19	—		Who Built the Moon?
"She Taught Me How to Fly"	2018	71	—	—	—	—	—	—	—	18	—		Who Built the Moon?
"If Love Is the Law"	2018	— (Note: "If Love Is the Law" did not enter the UK singles chart, but peaked at number 20 on the UK Singles Sales Chart.)	—	—	—	—	—	—	—	19	—		Who Built the Moon?
"Black Star Dancing"	2019	— (Note: "Black Star Dancing" did not enter the UK singles chart, but peaked at number 28 on the UK Singles Sales Chart.)	— (Note: "Black Star Dancing" did not enter the Flanders Ultratop 50, but charted as an "extra tip" on the Flanders Ultratip chart.)	— (Note: "Black Star Dancing" did not enter the Wallonie Ultratop 50, but charted as an "extra tip" on the Wallonie Ultratip chart.)	—	—	—	—	—	25	—		Black Star Dancing EP
"This Is the Place"	2019	— (Note: "This Is the Place" did not enter the UK singles chart, but peaked at number 61 on the UK Singles Sales Chart.)	— (Note: "This Is the Place" did not enter the Flanders Ultratop 50, but charted as an "extra tip" on the Flanders Ultratip chart.)	—	—	—	—	—	—	36	—		This Is the Place EP
"Wandering Star"	2019	— (Note: "Wandering Star" did not enter the UK singles chart, but peaked at number 41 on the UK Singles Sales Chart.)	—	—	—	—	—	—	—	34	—		Blue Moon Rising EP
"Blue Moon Rising"	2020	— (Note: "Blue Moon Rising" did not enter the UK singles chart, but peaked at number two on the UK Singles Sales Chart.)	— (Note: "Blue Moon Rising" did not enter the Flanders Ultratop 50, but charted as an "extra tip" on the Flanders Ultratip chart.)	— (Note: "Blue Moon Rising" did not enter the Wallonie Ultratop 50, but charted as an "extra tip" on the Wallonie Ultratip chart.)	—	—	—	—	—	2	—		Blue Moon Rising EP
"We're on Our Way Now"	2021	— (Note: "We're on Our Way Now" did not enter the UK singles chart, but peaked at number 14 on the UK Singles Sales Chart.)	—	—	—	—	—	—	—	×	—		Back the Way We Came: Vol 1 (2011–2021)
"Flying on the Ground"	2021	— (Note: "Flying on the Ground" did not enter the UK singles chart, but peaked at number 38 on the UK Singles Sales Chart.)	—	—	—	—	—	—	—	×	—		Back the Way We Came: Vol 1 (2011–2021)
"Pretty Boy"	2022	— (Note: "Pretty Boy" did not enter the UK singles chart, but peaked at number 25 on the UK Singles Sales Chart.)	—	—	—	—	—	—	—	×	—		Council Skies
"Easy Now"	2023	— (Note: "Easy Now" did not enter the UK singles chart, but peaked at number 26 on the UK Singles Sales Chart.)	—	—	—	—	—	—	—	×	— (Note: "Easy Now" did not enter the Hot Rock & Alternative Songs Chart, but peaked at number 43 on the Rock & Alternative Airplay Chart.)		Council Skies
"Dead to the World"	2023	— (Note: "Dead to the World" did not enter the UK singles chart, but peaked at number 18 on the UK Singles Sales Chart.)	—	—	—	—	—	—	—	×	—		Council Skies
"Council Skies"	2023	— (Note: "Council Skies" did not enter the UK singles chart, but peaked at number 77 on the UK Singles Sales Chart.)	—	—	—	—	—	— (Note: "Council Skies" did not enter the Billboard Japan Hot 100 chart, but peaked at number 19 on the Billboard Japan Hot Overseas Songs chart.)	—	×	—		Council Skies
"Open the Door, See What You Find"	2023	— (Note: "Open the Door, See What You Find" did not enter the UK singles chart, but peaked at number 69 on the UK Singles Sales Chart.)	—	—	—	—	—	—	—	×	—		Council Skies
"Love Will Tear Us Apart" (demo)	2023	— (Note: "Love Will Tear Us Apart" did not enter the UK singles chart, but peaked at number four on the UK Singles Sales Chart.)	—	—	—	—	—	—	—	×	—		Non-album singles
"In a Little While" (demo)	2023	— (Note: "In a Little While" did not enter the UK singles chart, but peaked at number four on the UK Singles Sales Chart.)	—	—	—	—	—	—	—	×	—		Non-album singles
"—" denotes a recording that did not chart or was not released in that territory. "×" denotes periods where charts did not exist or were not archived.

=== Promotional singles ===
Title	Year	Peak chart positions			Album
Title	Year	UK	UK Indie	SCO	Album
"Fort Knox"	2017	— (Note: "Fort Knox" did not enter the UK singles chart, but peaked at number 58 on the UK Singles Sales Chart.)	15	45	Who Built the Moon?
"Rattling Rose"	2019	— (Note: "Rattling Rose" did not enter the UK singles chart, but peaked at number 46 on the UK Singles Sales Chart.)	—	42	Black Star Dancing
"Sail On"	2019	— (Note: "Sail On" did not enter the UK singles chart, but peaked at number 35 on the UK Singles Sales Chart.)	—	25	Black Star Dancing
"Evil Flower"	2019	— (Note: "Evil Flower" did not enter the UK singles chart, but peaked at number 85 on the UK Singles Sales Chart.)	—	46	This Is the Place
"A Dream Is All I Need to Get By"	2019	— (Note: "A Dream Is All I Need to Get By" did not enter the UK singles chart, but peaked at number 68 on the UK Singles Sales Chart.)	—	50	This Is the Place
"Come on Outside"	2020	— (Note: "Come on Outside" did not enter the UK singles chart, but peaked at number 37 on the UK Singles Sales Chart.)	—	29	Blue Moon Rising
"We're Gonna Get There in the End"	2020	— (Note: "We're Gonna Get There in the End" did not enter the UK singles chart, but peaked at number nine on the UK Singles Sales Chart.)	—	×	Council Skies
"Trying to Find a World That's Been and Gone: Part 1"	2022	— (Note: "Trying to Find a World That's Been and Gone: Part 1" did not enter the UK singles chart, but peaked at number 47 on the UK Singles Downloads Chart.)	—	×	Council Skies
"—" denotes a recording that did not chart or was not released in that territory. "×" denotes periods where charts did not exist or were not archived.

== Other charted songs ==
List of songs with selected chart positions, showing year released and album name
Title	Year	Peak chart positions			Album
Title	Year	UK	UK Indie	SCO	Album
"The Good Rebel"	2011	177	22	—	Noel Gallagher's High Flying Birds
"Let the Lord Shine a Light on Me"	2011	123	17	—	"AKA... What a Life!" single
"Shoot a Hole into the Sun"	2012	—	25	—	"Dream On" single
"Do the Damage"	2014	113	5	50	Chasing Yesterday
"Revolution Song"	2015	147	6	—	Chasing Yesterday
"The Girl with X-Ray Eyes"	2015	—	19	—	Chasing Yesterday
"The Right Stuff"	2015	—	24	—	Chasing Yesterday
"While the Song Remains the Same"	2015	—	30	—	Chasing Yesterday
"The Mexican"	2015	—	32	—	Chasing Yesterday
"You Know We Can't Go Back"	2015	—	25	—	Chasing Yesterday
"Keep on Reaching"	2017	—	17	—	Who Built the Moon?
"Be Careful What You Wish For"	2017	—	25	—	Who Built the Moon?
"Black & White Sunshine"	2017	—	31	—	Who Built the Moon?
"The Man Who Built the Moon"	2017	—	30	—	Who Built the Moon?
"Dead in the Water"	2017	— (Note: "Dead in the Water" did not enter the UK singles chart, but peaked at number 78 on the UK Singles Sales Chart.)	14	56	Who Built the Moon?
"Think of a Number"	2023	— (Note: "Think of a Number" did not enter the UK singles chart, but peaked at number 92 on the UK Singles Sales Chart.)	—	—	Council Skies
"Live Forever"	2023	— (Note: "Live Forever" did not enter the UK singles chart, but peaked at number 49 on the UK Singles Sales Chart.)	—	—	Council Skies
"—" denotes a recording that did not chart or was not released in that territory.

== Videography ==
=== Video albums ===
List of video albums with selected chart positions and certifications
Title	Album details	Peak chart positions					Certifications
Title	Album details	UK	GER	JPN	NED	SWI	Certifications
International Magic Live at the O2	Released: 15 October 2012; Label: Sour Mash (JDNC #16); Formats: DVD+CD, BD+CD	1	75	46	11	4	BPI: Gold

=== Music videos ===
List of music videos showing year released
Title	Year	Director(s)	Ref.
"The Death of You and Me"	2011	Mike Bruce	
"AKA... What a Life!"	2011	Mike Bruce	
"If I Had a Gun..."	2011	Mike Bruce	
"Dream On"	2012	Mike Bruce	
"Everybody's on the Run"	2012	Mike Bruce	
"In the Heat of the Moment"	2014	Ollie Murray	
"Do the Damage"	2014	Mike Bruce	
"Ballad of the Mighty I"	2015	John Hardwick	
"Riverman"	2015	John Minton	
"Lock All the Doors"	2015	Vern Moen	
"Holy Mountain"	2017	Ollie Murray	
"It's a Beautiful World"	2018	Mike Bruce	
"She Taught Me How to Fly"	2018	Julian House	
"Be Careful What You Wish For"	2018	Mike Bruce	
"If Love Is the Law"	2018	Mike Bruce	
"Black Star Dancing"	2019	Dan Cadan and Jonathan Mowatt	
"This Is the Place"	2019	Dan Cadan and Jonathan Mowatt	
"Wandering Star"	2019	Dan Cadan and Jonathan Mowatt	
"Blue Moon Rising"	2020	Dan Cadan and Jonathan Mowatt	
"We're on Our Way Now"	2021	Dan Cadan and Jonathan Mowatt	
"Flying on the Ground"	2021	Dan Cadan and Jonathan Mowatt	
"Easy Now"	2023	Colin Solal Cardo	
"Council Skies"	2023	Dan Cadan and Jonathan Mowatt	
"We're Gonna Get There in the End"	2023	Unknown	
