= Back the Way We Came: Vol. 1 (2011–2021) =

Greatest hits album by Noel Gallagher's High Flying Birds
- Released: 11 June 2021
- Recorded: 2010–2021
- Studio: Various
- Genre: Rock
- Length: 79:09
- Label: Sour Mash
- Producer: Noel Gallagher; Dave Sardy; Paul Stacey; David Holmes

Noel Gallagher's High Flying Birds chronology
Blue Moon Rising (2020)	Back the Way We Came: Vol. 1 (2011–2021) (2021)	Council Skies (2023)

Singles from Back the Way We Came: Vol. 1 (2011–2021)
- 1. "We're on Our Way Now" Released: 29 April 2021; 2. "Flying on the Ground" Released: 7 June 2021

Back the Way We Came: Vol. 1 (2011–2021) is a compilation album by English rock band Noel Gallagher's High Flying Birds. It was released on 11 June 2021 by Sour Mash Records. The album was curated and compiled by Noel Gallagher. The standard 2-CD version of the album includes tracks from the band's first three albums, Noel Gallagher's High Flying Birds (2011), Chasing Yesterday (2015) and Who Built the Moon? (2017), and the three EPs Black Star Dancing (2019), This Is the Place (2019) and Blue Moon Rising (2020), plus two previously unreleased tracks, "We're on Our Way Now" and "Flying on the Ground", the former of which was released as a single the same day as the announcement of the album, on 29 April 2021. A deluxe edition includes a third CD of alternative versions, instrumental versions and remixes of various tracks.

In an interview with Apple Music, Gallagher said that Best of Bee Gees is one of his favourite albums and that it inspired the cover of Back the Way We Came.

== Critical reception ==
Professional ratings
Review scores
Source	Rating
AllMusic	4/5 stars
Clash	8/10
Irish Examiner	4/5 stars
The Irish Times	2/5 stars

Back the Way We Came: Vol. 1 (2011–2021) received generally positive reviews from music critics.

== Track listing ==
All tracks are written by Noel Gallagher.

Disc one
No.	Title	Length
1.	"Everybody's on the Run" (from Noel Gallagher's High Flying Birds)	5:31
2.	"The Death of You and Me" (from Noel Gallagher's High Flying Birds)	3:28
3.	"AKA... What a Life!" (from Noel Gallagher's High Flying Birds)	4:23
4.	"If I Had a Gun..." (from Noel Gallagher's High Flying Birds)	4:09
5.	"In the Heat of the Moment" (from Chasing Yesterday)	3:30
6.	"Riverman" (from Chasing Yesterday)	5:43
7.	"Lock All the Doors" (from Chasing Yesterday)	3:42
8.	"The Dying of the Light" (from Chasing Yesterday)	5:07
9.	"Ballad of the Mighty I" (from Chasing Yesterday)	5:09
10.	"We're on Our Way Now" (new song)	4:07

Disc two
No.	Title	Length
1.	"Black Star Dancing" (from Black Star Dancing EP)	4:22
2.	"Holy Mountain" (from Who Built the Moon?)	3:56
3.	"A Dream Is All I Need to Get By" (from This is the Place EP)	4:08
4.	"This Is the Place" (from This is the Place EP)	4:17
5.	"It's a Beautiful World" (from Who Built the Moon?)	5:19
6.	"Blue Moon Rising" (from Blue Moon Rising EP)	3:44
7.	"Dead in the Water (Live at RTÉ 2FM Studios, Dublin)" (from Who Built the Moon?)	5:21
8.	"Flying on the Ground" (new song)	3:13
Total length:		79:09

Deluxe edition bonus disc
No.	Title	Length
1.	"It's a Beautiful World" (Instrumental)	5:23
2.	"If I Had a Gun..." (Acoustic Version)	4:07
3.	"Black Star Dancing" (Skeleton Key Remix)	4:14
4.	"Black Star Dancing" (12" Mix Instrumental)	4:38
5.	"The Man Who Built the Moon" (Acoustic Version)	4:31
6.	"International Magic" (Demo)	5:17
7.	"Blue Moon Rising" (Sons of the Desert Remix)	7:05
8.	"The Dying of the Light" (Acoustic Version)	5:13
9.	"This Is the Place" (Skeleton Key Remix)	3:05
10.	"This Is the Place" (Instrumental)	4:17
11.	"Black Star Dancing" (The Reflex Revision)	10:06
12.	"Be Careful What You Wish For" (Instrumental)	5:41
Total length:		62:17

Japanese edition bonus tracks
No.	Title	Length
13.	"Everybody's on the Run" (Live at Fuji Rock Festival 2012)	5:23
14.	"Dream On" (Live at Fuji Rock Festival 2012)	4:13
15.	"If I Had a Gun..." (Live at Fuji Rock Festival 2012)	4:15
Total length:		76:21

== Charts ==
=== Weekly charts ===
Weekly chart performance for Back the Way We Came: Vol. 1 (2011–2021)
Chart (2021)	Peak position
Australian Albums (ARIA)	51
Austrian Albums (Ö3 Austria)	19
Belgian Albums (Ultratop Flanders)	49
Belgian Albums (Ultratop Wallonia)	47
Dutch Albums (Album Top 100)	32
French Albums (SNEP)	164
German Albums (Offizielle Top 100)	12
Irish Albums (Official Charts)	2
Italian Albums (FIMI)	48
Japan Hot Albums (Billboard Japan)	24
Japanese Albums (Oricon)	14
Scottish Albums (Official Charts)	1
Spanish Albums (Promusicae)	61
Swiss Albums (Schweizer Hitparade)	14
UK Albums (Official Charts)	1
UK Independent Albums (Official Charts)	1

=== Year-end charts ===
Year-end chart performance for Back the Way We Came: Vol. 1 (2011–2021)
Chart (2021)	Position
UK Albums (OCC)	93

== Certifications ==
Region	Certification	Certified units/sales
United Kingdom (BPI)	Gold	100,000^{‡}
^{‡} Sales+streaming figures based on certification alone.
