= Stranded on the Earth World Tour =

2018–19 concert tour by Noel Gallagher's High Flying Birds

- Tour by Noel Gallagher's High Flying Birds
- Associated album: Who Built the Moon?
- Start date: 9 February 2018
- End date: 30 November 2019
- Legs: 9
- No. of shows: 40 in North America; 67 in Europe; 9 in Asia; 7 in South America; 123 in Total

Noel Gallagher's High Flying Birds concert chronology
- Chasing Yesterday Tour (2015–16); Stranded on the Earth World Tour (2018–19); Garbage & Noel Gallagher's High Flying Birds: Live in Concert (2023)

The Stranded on the Earth World Tour was a concert tour by Noel Gallagher's High Flying Birds to support Gallagher's 2017 album Who Built the Moon?.

== Background ==
On 25 September 2017, Noel Gallagher announced Who Built the Moon?, the High Flying Birds third studio album. Concerts were also announced, taking place in Europe. Beginning on 3 April at Paris' L'Olympia Theatre and ending at the 3Arena in Dublin. Later the same day concerts taking place throughout North American were also announced.

== Set list ==
The band's typical set list was:

1. "Fort Knox"
2. "Holy Mountain"
3. "Keep On Reaching"
4. "It's a Beautiful World"
5. "In the Heat of the Moment"
6. "Riverman"
7. "Ballad of the Mighty I"
8. "If I Had a Gun..."
9. "Dream On"
10. "Little by Little"
11. "The Importance of Being Idle"
12. "If Love Is the Law"
13. "Dead In The Water"
14. "Be Careful What You Wish For"
15. "She Taught Me How To Fly"
16. "Half the World Away"
17. "Wonderwall"
18. "AKA... What a Life!"

Encore

19. "The Right Stuff"
20. "Go Let It Out"
21. "Don't Look Back in Anger"
22. "All You Need Is Love"

== Tour dates ==
Date	City	Country	Venue	Attendance	Box Office
North America
9 February 2018	Detroit	United States	Detroit Masonic Temple	—	—
10 February 2018	Columbus	United States	Express Live!	1,335 / 1,798	$53,093
12 February 2018	Washington, D.C.	United States	The Anthem	2,179 / 2,500	$123,590
13 February 2018	Philadelphia	United States	Miller Theater	1,664 / 1,746	$82,854
15 February 2018	New York City	United States	Radio City Music Hall	5,824 / 5,824	$388,968
17 February 2018	Boston	United States	Boston Opera House	2,570 / 2,628	$125,870
18 February 2018	Montreal	Canada	Salle Wilfrid-Pelletier	1,500 / 1,765	$90,245
20 February 2018	Toronto	Canada	Sony Centre for the Performing Arts	—	—
23 February 2018	Akron	United States	Goodyear Theater	—	—
24 February 2018	Chicago	United States	Chicago Theatre	3,082 / 3,436	$165,157
25 February 2018	Indianapolis	United States	Murat Theatre at Old National Centre	—	—
27 February 2018	Nashville	United States	Ryman Auditorium	1,422 / 2,021	$96,829
28 February 2018	Atlanta	United States	The Tabernacle	—	—
2 March 2018	New Orleans	United States	Orpheum Theater	—	—
3 March 2018	Houston	United States	House of Blues	—	—
5 March 2018	Austin	United States	ACL Live at The Moody Theater	—	—
6 March 2018	Dallas	United States	Majestic Theatre	—	—
9 March 2018	Las Vegas	United States	The Chelsea at the Cosmopolitan	—	—
10 March 2018	Oakland	United States	Fox Oakland Theatre	—	—
12 March 2018	Los Angeles	United States	Orpheum Theatre	3,526 / 4,014	$203,089
13 March 2018	Los Angeles	United States	Orpheum Theatre	3,526 / 4,014	$203,089
17 March 2018 (Note: The 17 March 2018 concert in Mexico City was part of Vive Latino.)	Mexico City	Mexico	Foro Sol	—	—
Europe
3 April 2018	Paris	France	L'Olympia	—	—
4 April 2018	Paris	France	L'Olympia	—	—
6 April 2018	Brussels	Belgium	Forest National	—	—
8 April 2018	Hamburg	Germany	Mehr! Theater am Großmarkt	—	—
9 April 2018	Düsseldorf	Germany	Mitsubishi Electric Halle	—	—
11 April 2018	Milan	Italy	Fabrique Milano	—	—
12 April 2018	Munich	Germany	Zenith	—	—
14 April 2018	Prague	Czech Republic	Lucerna Great Hall	—	—
16 April 2018	Berlin	Germany	Max-Schmeling-Halle	—	—
17 April 2018	Wiesbaden	Germany	Kulturzentrum Schlachthof	—	—
19 April 2018	Amsterdam	Netherlands	AFAS Live	—	—
20 April 2018	Esch-sur-Alzette	Luxembourg	Rockhal	—	—
22 April 2018	Brighton	England	Brighton Centre	—	—
24 April 2018	Glasgow	Scotland	The SSE Hydro	12,128 / 12,204	$867,487
25 April 2018	Aberdeen	Scotland	BHGE Arena	—	—
27 April 2018	London	England	SSE Arena Wembley	11,225 / 11,449	$904,786
30 April 2018	Nottingham	England	Motorpoint Arena Nottingham	—	—
1 May 2018	Birmingham	England	Arena Birmingham	—	—
3 May 2018	Newcastle	England	Metro Radio Arena	—	—
4 May 2018	Manchester	England	Manchester Arena	14,954 / 15,755	$1,083,350
6 May 2018	Cardiff	Wales	Motorpoint Arena Cardiff	—	—
7 May 2018	Leeds	England	First Direct Arena	—	—
9 May 2018	Belfast	Northern Ireland	SSE Arena Belfast	—	—
10 May 2018	Dublin	Ireland	3Arena	—	—
14 May 2018 (Note: The 24 May 2018 concert in Watford was part of Global's Make Some Noise.)	Watford	England	Watford Colosseum	—	—
26 May 2018 (Note: The 26 May 2018 concert in Perth was part of BBC Radio 2's Biggest Weekend.)	Perth	Scotland	Scone Palace	—	—
27 May 2018 (Note: The 27 May 2018 concert in Warrington was part of Neighbourhood Weekender.)	Warrington	England	Victoria Park	—	—
1 June 2018	Saint Petersburg	Russia	A2 Green Concert	—	—
2 June 2018	Moscow	Russia	Stadium Live	—	—
15 June 2018 (Note: The 15 June 2018 concert in Woodstock was part of Nocturne Festival.)	Woodstock	England	Blenheim Palace	—	—
16 June 2018 (Note: The 16 June 2018 concert in Landgraaf was part of Pinkpop Festival.)	Landgraaf	Netherlands	Megaland	—	—
19 June 2018	Taormina	Italy	Teatro Antico di Taormina	—	—
21 June 2018	Naples	Italy	ETES Arena Flegrea	—	—
22 June 2018 (Note: The 22 June 2018 concert in Rome was part of Roma Summer Fest.)	Rome	Italy	Auditorium Parco della Musica	—	—
23 June 2018 (Note: The 23 June 2018 concert in Milan was part of I-Days 2018.)	Milan	Italy	Area Expo	—	—
4 July 2018 (Note: The 4 July 2018 concert in Gdynia was part of Open'er Festival.)	Gdynia	Poland	Gdynia-Kosakowo Airport	—	—
6 July 2018	Scarborough	England	Scarborough Open Air Theatre	—	—
7 July 2018 (Note: The 7 July 2018 concert in London was part of Greenwich Music Time.)	London	England	Old Royal Naval College	—	—
8 July 2018 (Note: The 8 July 2018 concert in Werchter was part of Rock Werchter.)	Werchter	Belgium	Werchter Festival Grounds	—	—
14 July 2018 (Note: The 14 July 2018 concert in Bilbao was part of Bilbao BBK Live.)	Bilbao	Spain	Kobetamendi Bilbao	—	—
18 July 2018	Manchester	England	The O_{2} Ritz	—	—
19 July 2018	Edinburgh	Scotland	Edinburgh Castle	—	—
21 July 2018 (Note: The 21 July 2018 concert in Sheffield was part of Tramlines Festival.)	Sheffield	England	Hillsborough Park	—	—
22 July 2018 (Note: The 21 July 2018 concert in Paris was part of Lollapalooza Paris.)	Paris	France	Longchamp Racecourse	—	—
Asia
16 August 2018	Seoul	South Korea	Olympic Hall	—	—
18 August 2018 (Note: The 18 and 19 August 2018 concerts were part of Summer Sonic.)	Chiba	Japan	Zozo Marine Stadium	—	—
19 August 2018	Osaka	Japan	Maishima Sonic Park	—	—
Europe
26 August 2018 (Note: The 26 August 2018 concert in Rennes was part of Festival du Roi Arthur.)	Rennes	France	Bréal-sous-Montfort	—	—
31 August 2018 (Note: The 31 August 2018 concert in Dumfries was part of Electric Fields Festival.)	Dumfries and Galloway	Scotland	Drumlanrig Castle	—	—
1 September 2018 (Note: The 1 September 2018 concert in Bristol was part of The Downs Festival.)	Bristol	England	Clifton Down	—	—
2 September 2018 (Note: The 2 September 2018 concert in Bingley was part of Bingley Music Live.)	Bingley	England	Myrtle Park	—	—
South America
30 October 2018	Concepción	Chile	Gimnasio Municipal De Concepción	—	—
31 October 2018 (Note: The 31 October 2018 concert in Santiago was part of Colors Night Lights.)	Santiago	Chile	Velódromo del Estadio Nacional	—	—
3 November 2018	Rosario	Argentina	Salón Metropolitano	—	—
4 November 2018	Buenos Aires	Argentina	Estadio Luna Park	—	—
7 November 2018 (Note: The 7 and 8 November concerts were part of Summer Break Festival.)	Curitiba	Brazil	Pedreira Paulo Leminski	—	—
8 November 2018	São Paulo	Brazil	Arena Anhembi	—	—
10 November 2018	Belo Horizonte	Brazil	KM de Vantagens Hall	3,036 / 5,180	$136,998
Europe
1 May 2019 (Note: The 1 May 2019 concert in Rome is part of Primo Maggio Roma.)	Rome	Italy	Piazza San Giovanni	—	—
4 May 2019 (Note: The 4 May 2019 concert in Murcia is part of Warm Up Festival.)	Murcia	Spain	FICA Murcia	—	—
7 May 2019	Edinburgh	Scotland	Edinburgh Playhouse	—	—
8 May 2019	Llandudno	Wales	Venue Cymru	—	—
9 May 2019	London	England	London Palladium	—	—
11 May 2019	Hull	England	Airco Arena	—	—
Asia
15 May 2019	Chiba	Japan	Makuhari Messe	—	—
16 May 2019	Nagoya	Japan	Aichi Arts Center	—	—
17 May 2019	Osaka	Japan	Festival Hall	—	—
19 May 2019	Seoul	South Korea	Olympic Hall	—	—
20 May 2019	Seoul	South Korea	Olympic Hall	—	—
Europe
24 May 2019	Cardiff	Wales	Cardiff Castle	—	—
25 May 2019 (Note: The 25 May 2019 concert in Newcastle is part of This Is Tomorrow Festival.)	Newcastle	England	Exhibition Park	—	—
26 May 2019 (Note: The 26 May and 30 June 2019 concerts are part of Sunday Sessions 2019.)	Norwich	England	Earlham Park	—	—
7 June 2019	Manchester	England	Heaton Park	—	—
8 June 2019	Inverness	Scotland	Bught Park	—	—
14 June 2019 (Note: The 14 June 2019 concert on the Isle of Wight is part of the Isle of Wight Festival.)	Newport	England	Seaclose Park	—	—
16 June 2019	Dublin	Ireland	Malahide Castle	—	—
29 June 2019 (Note: The 29 June 2019 concert in Zeeland is part of Concert at Sea.)	Zeeland	Netherlands	Brouwersdam	—	—
30 June 2019	Exeter	England	Powderham Castle	—	—
6 July 2019 (Note: The 6 July 2019 concert in Roskilde is part of Roskilde Festival.)	Roskilde	Denmark	Darupvej	—	—
8 July 2019 (Note: The 8 July 2019 concert in Pistoia is part of the Pistoia Blues Festival.)	Pistoia	Italy	Piazza del Duomo	—	—
9 July 2019 (Note: The 8 July 2019 concert in Mantua is part of Mantova Arte e Musica.)	Mantua	Italy	Piazza Sordello	—	—
11 July 2019 (Note: The 11 July 2019 concert in Madrid is part of Mad Cool Festival.)	Madrid	Spain	Espacio Mad Cool	—	—
North America (with The Smashing Pumpkins)
8 August 2019	Camden	United States	BB&T Pavilion	—	—
9 August 2019	Wantagh	United States	Northwell Health at Jones Beach Theater	—	—
10 August 2019	Darien	United States	Darien Lake Performing Arts Center	—	—
13 August 2019	Toronto	Canada	Budweiser Stage	—	—
14 August 2019	Clarkston	United States	DTE Energy Music Theatre	—	—
15 August 2019	Tinley Park	United States	Hollywood Casino Amphitheatre	—	—
17 August 2019	Columbia	United States	Merriweather Post Pavilion	—	—
19 August 2019	Cuyahoga Falls	United States	Blossom Music Center	—	—
20 August 2019	Charlotte	United States	PNC Music Pavilion	—	—
21 August 2019	Alpharetta	United States	Ameris Bank Amphitheatre	—	—
23 August 2019	Rogers	United States	Walmart Arkansas Music Pavilion	—	—
24 August 2019	Dallas	United States	Dos Equis Pavilion	—	—
25 August 2019	The Woodlands	United States	Cynthia Woods Mitchell Pavilion	—	—
28 August 2019	Chula Vista	United States	North Island Credit Union Amphitheatre	—	—
29 August 2019	Irvine	United States	FivePoint Amphitheatre	—	—
31 August 2019	Mountain View	United States	Shoreline Amphitheatre	—	—
Asia
30 November 2019	Bangkok	Thailand	Live Park (Rama 9)	—	—
TOTAL				64,355 / 70,320 (92%)	$4,322,316

Cancellations and rescheduled shows

30 August 2019	Los Angeles	Banc of California Stadium	Cancelled.

== Personnel ==
- Noel Gallagher — lead vocals, lead & rhythm guitar
- Gem Archer — lead & rhythm guitar
- Russell Pritchard – bass, backing vocals
- Mike Rowe – piano, keyboards
- Chris Sharrock — drums
- YSEE – Vocals
- Ben Edwards – trumpet
- Jessica Greenfield – keyboards, percussion, backing vocals
- Steve Hamilton – saxophone
- Alistair White – trombone
- Charlotte Marionneau — additional vocals, scissors, percussion, tin whistle
