= Chasing Yesterday Tour =

2015–16 concert tour by Noel Gallagher's High Flying Birds

- Tour by Noel Gallagher's High Flying Birds
- Location: Europe, Asia, North America, South America, Oceania
- Associated album: Chasing Yesterday
- Start date: 3 March 2015
- End date: 6 September 2016
- Legs: 10
- No. of shows: 70 in Europe; 11 in Asia; 33 in North America; 6 in South America; 5 in Oceania; 125 in Total

Noel Gallagher's High Flying Birds concert chronology
- High Flying Birds Tour (2011–12); Chasing Yesterday Tour (2015–16); Stranded on the Earth World Tour (2018–19)

The Chasing Yesterday Tour was a concert tour by Noel Gallagher's High Flying Birds to support Gallagher's 2015 album Chasing Yesterday.

== Background ==
On 13 October 2014 Noel Gallagher took to Facebook to announce details of his second album with the High Flying Birds, dates and venues of a supporting tour and to take part in a Question and Answer session. Originally only European concert dates were announced. Several concerts in the UK sold out very quickly, leaving many fans frustrated.

On 27 October 2014 five concerts were announced for Japan in April 2015. There were also concerts to be announced in North America to also take place in 2015.

For the 2016 North America and Europe dates, the band was joined by former Oasis tour drummer Chris Sharrock, replacing Jeremy Stacey who had left after the previous tour legs to join King Crimson.

== Support acts ==
- Black Rivers (Leg 1; United Kingdom & Ireland)
- Augustines (Leg 8; Austria)
- Super Furry Animals (Leg 8; United Kingdom)

== Set list ==
This set list is representative of the performance on 9 April 2016 in Barcelona, Spain. It does not represent all concerts for the duration of the tour.

1. "Everybody's on the Run"
2. "Lock All the Doors"
3. "In the Heat of the Moment"
4. "Riverman"
5. "Talk Tonight"
6. "The Death of You and Me"
7. "You Know We Can't Go Back"
8. "Champagne Supernova"
9. "Ballad of the Mighty I"
10. "Sad Song"
11. "D'Yer Wanna Be a Spaceman?"
12. "The Mexican"
13. "Half the World Away"
14. "Listen Up"
15. "If I Had a Gun..."
16. "Digsy's Dinner"
17. "The Masterplan"

Encore

18. "Wonderwall"
19. "AKA... What a Life!"
20. "Don't Look Back in Anger"

== Song statistics ==
In total, the band performed 34 different songs across the tour.

Song	Number of performances
"AKA... What a Life!"	125
"Everybody's on the Run"	125
"Lock All the Doors"	124
"You Know We Can't Go Back"	123
"Don't Look Back In Anger"	123
"In the Heat of the Moment"	123
"The Mexican"	123
"Riverman"	122
"If I Had a Gun..."	119
"Champagne Supernova"	118
"Digsy's Dinner"	118
"The Masterplan"	116
"The Death of You and Me"	97
"Fade Away"	84
"Ballad of the Mighty I"	76
"Dream On"	71
"The Dying of the Light"	61
"Half the World Away"	56
"Wonderwall"	55
"(Stranded On) The Wrong Beach"	50
"AKA... Broken Arrow"	49
"Do the Damage"	45
"Listen Up"	42
"D'Yer Wanna Be a Spaceman?"	41
"Talk Tonight"	38
"Whatever"	27
"Sad Song"	19
"(I Wanna Live in a Dream In My) Record Machine"	7
"Live Forever"	5
"Freaky Teeth"	2
"Shout It Out Loud"	2
"Pretty Green" (The Jam) with Paul Weller	2
"Town Called Malice"	2
"Alone on the Rope"	1

== Tour dates ==
Date	City	Country	Venue	Attendance	Box office
Europe
3 March 2015	Belfast	Northern Ireland	Odyssey Arena	7,527 / 7,527	$332,108
4 March 2015	Dublin	Ireland	3Arena	10,857 / 10,857	$623,839
6 March 2015	Nottingham	England	Capital FM Arena	—	—
7 March 2015	Glasgow	Scotland	The SSE Hydro	12,344 / 12,415	$1,038,150
9 March 2015	Manchester	England	Phones 4u Arena	—	—
10 March 2015	London	England	The O_{2} Arena	16,296 / 17,379	$1,372,260
12 March 2015	Paris	France	Zénith de Paris	—	—
14 March 2015	Milan	Italy	Milano Fabrique	—	—
16 March 2015	Berlin	Germany	Max-Schmeling-Halle	—	—
17 March 2015	Copenhagen	Denmark	Store Vega	—	—
19 March 2015	Düsseldorf	Germany	Mitsubishi Electric Halle	—	—
20 March 2015	Utrecht	Netherlands	TivoliVredenburg	—	—
22 March 2015	Brussels	Belgium	Ancienne Belgique	—	—
Asia
3 April 2015	Seoul	South Korea	Sheraton Walkerhill Theatre	—	—
4 April 2015	Seoul	South Korea	Sheraton Walkerhill Theatre	—	—
6 April 2015	Osaka	Japan	Osaka Festival Hall	—	—
7 April 2015	Osaka	Japan	Osaka Festival Hall	—	—
9 April 2015	Hiroshima	Japan	Hiroshima Bunka Gakuen Hall	—	—
11 April 2015	Fukuoka	Japan	Zepp Fukuoka	—	—
13 April 2015	Nagoya	Japan	Zepp Nagoya	—	—
15 April 2015	Tokyo	Japan	Nippon Budokan	—	—
16 April 2015	Tokyo	Japan	Nippon Budokan	—	—
North America
3 May 2015	Toronto	Canada	Sony Centre for the Performing Arts	—	—
4 May 2015	Toronto	Canada	Sony Centre for the Performing Arts	—	—
7 May 2015	New York City	United States	Webster Hall	—	—
8 May 2015	Atlanta	United States	Central Park	— (Note: The 8 May 2015 concert in Atlanta is a part of the Shaky Knees Music Festival.)	
10 May 2015	New Orleans	United States	The Civic Theatre	—	—
13 May 2015	Houston	United States	House of Blues	—	—
14 May 2015	Dallas	United States	Majestic Theatre	—	—
16 May 2015	San Diego	United States	Humphreys Concerts By the Bay	—	—
18 May 2015	San Francisco	United States	The Warfield	1,534 / 1,724	$84,383
20 May 2015	Los Angeles	United States	Orpheum Theatre	—	—
22 May 2015	Las Vegas	United States	The Joint	1,417 / 1,820	$85,430
26 May 2015	Mexico City	Mexico	Teatro Metropólitan	5,390 / 6,296	$362,556
29 May 2015	Chicago	United States	Riviera Theatre	2,510 / 2,510	$110,440
30 May 2015	Milwaukee	United States	Pabst Theater	—	—
31 May 2015	Royal Oak	United States	Royal Oak Music Theatre	1,530 / 1,800	$67,112
2 June 2015	Cleveland	United States	House of Blues	—	—
3 June 2015	Philadelphia	United States	Merriam Theater	—	—
4 June 2015	Washington, D.C.	United States	Lincoln Theatre	—	—
6 June 2015	Boston	United States	Boston Opera House	—	—
7 June 2015	New York City	United States	Randalls Island	— (Note: The 7 June 2015 concert in New York City is a part of the Governors Ball Music Festival.)	
Europe
12 June 2015	Warsaw	Poland	National Stadium	— (Note: The 12 June 2015 concert in Warsaw is a part of the Orange Warsaw Festival.)	
14 June 2015	Moscow	Russia	Yotaspace	—	—
19 June 2015	Tuttlingen	Germany	Flugplatz	— (Note: The 20 June 2015 concert in Tuttlingen is a part of the Southside Festival.)	
20 June 2015	Hilvarenbeek	Netherlands	Beekse Bergen	— (Note: The 20 June 2015 concert in Hilvarenbeek is a part of the Best Kept Secret.)	
21 June 2015	Scheeßel	Germany	Eichenring	— (Note: The 19 June 2015 concert in Scheeßel is a part of the Hurricane Festival.)	
23 June 2015	Paris	France	Place de la République	— (Note: The 23 June 2015 concert in Paris is a part of the OÜI FM Festival.)	
26 June 2015	St. Gallen	Switzerland	Sittertobel St. Gallen	— (Note: The 26 June 2015 concert in St. Gallen is a part of Open Air St. Gallen.)	
27 June 2015	Werchter	Belgium	Werchter Festival Grounds	— (Note: The 27 June 2015 concert in Werchter is a part of Rock Werchter.)	
1 July 2015	Roskilde	Denmark	Festival Grounds	— (Note: The 1 July 2015 concert in Roskilde is a part of the Roskilde Festival.)	
2 July 2015	Stockholm	Sweden	Gröna Lund	—	—
4 July 2015	London	England	Clapham Common	— (Note: The 4 July 2015 concert in London is a part of Clapham Calling.)	
6 July 2015	Milan	Italy	Assago Summer Arena	—	—
8 July 2015	Piazzola sul Brenta	Italy	Festival Grounds	— (Note: The 8 July 2015 concert in Piazzola sul Brenta is a part of the Hydrogen Festival.)	
9 July 2015	Rome	Italy	Capannelle Racecourse	— (Note: The 9 July 2015 concert in Rome is a part of Rock in Roma.)	
11 July 2015	Manchester	England	Castlefield Bowl	— (Note: The 11 July 2015 concert in Manchester is a part of Summer in the City.)	
12 July 2015	Strathallan	Scotland	Strathallan Castle	— (Note: The 12 July 2015 concert in Strathallan is a part of T in the Park.)	
14 July 2015	Cork	Ireland	The Docklands	— (Note: The 14 July 2015 concert in Cork is a part of Live at the Marquee.)	
16 July 2015	Lisbon	Portugal	Parque das Nações	— (Note: The 16 July 2015 concert in Lisbon is a part of Super Bock Super Rock.)	
17 July 2015	Benicàssim	Spain	Benicàssim Festival Grounds	— (Note: The 17 July 2015 concert in Benicàssim is a part of Festival Internacional de Benicàssim.)	
19 July 2015	Suffolk	England	Henham Park	— (Note: The 19 July 2015 concert in Suffolk is a part of Latitude Festival.)	
Asia
24 July 2015	Ansan	South Korea	Daebu Sea Breeze Theme Park	— (Note: The 24 July 2015 concert in Ansan is a part of Jisan Valley Rock Festival.)	
26 July 2015	Yuzawa	Japan	Naeba Ski Resort	— (Note: The 26 July 2015 concert in Yuzawa is a part of Fuji Rock Festival.)	
Europe
2 December 2015	Manchester	England	O_{2} Apollo Manchester	— (Note: The 2 December 2015 concert in Manchester is a part of the Radio X Road Trip.)	
5 December 2015	Lincoln	England	Bishop Grosseteste University	—	—
8 December 2015	Glasgow	Scotland	The SSE Hydro	— (Note: The 8 December 2015 concert in Glasgow is a part of Clyde 1 Live.)	
10 December 2015	London	England	Royal Albert Hall	—	—
Latin America
8 March 2016	Guadalajara	Mexico	Teatro Diana	—	—
9 March 2016	Mexico City	Mexico	Teatro Metropólitan	—	—
11 March 2016	Bogotá	Colombia	El Parque Deportivo 222	— (Note: The 11 March 2016 concert in Bogotá is a part of Festival Estéreo Picnic.)	
13 March 2016	São Paulo	Brazil	Autódromo José Carlos Pace	— (Note: The 13 March 2016 concert in São Paulo is a part of Lollapalooza São Paulo.)	
15 March 2016	Montevideo	Uruguay	Teatro de Verano Ramón Collazo	2,495 / 3,000	$111,185
16 March 2016	Buenos Aires	Argentina	Luna Park	—	—
19 March 2016	Buenos Aires	Argentina	Hipódromo de San Isidro	— (Note: The 18 March 2016 concert in Buenos Aires is a part of Lollapalooza Argentina.)	
20 March 2016	Santiago	Chile	O'Higgins Park	— (Note: The 20 March 2016 concert in Santiago is a part of Lollapalooza Santiago.)	
Oceania
26 March 2016	Sydney	Australia	Hordern Pavilion	—	—
27 March 2016	Byron Bay	Australia	Tyagarah Park	— (Note: The 27 March 2016 concert in Byron Bay is a part of the Byron Bay Bluesfest.)	
29 March 2016	Melbourne	Australia	Margaret Court Arena	—	—
30 March 2016	Adelaide	Australia	AEC Theatre	—	—
1 April 2016	Perth	Australia	Crown Theatre	—	—
Europe
8 April 2016	Madrid	Spain	Sala Riviera	—	—
9 April 2016	Barcelona	Spain	Sant Jordi Club	—	—
11 April 2016	Zürich	Switzerland	Zürich X-TRA	—	—
12 April 2016	Vienna	Austria	Vienna Gasometer	—	—
14 April 2016	Munich	Germany	Munich Zenith	—	—
15 April 2016	Cologne	Germany	Köln Palladium	—	—
17 April 2016	Brussels	Belgium	Forest National	4,241 / 4,500	$163,913
18 April 2016	Amsterdam	Netherlands	Heineken Music Hall	—	—
21 April 2016	Glasgow	Scotland	The SSE Hydro	12,352 / 12,435	$870,206
24 April 2016	Aberdeen	Scotland	GE Oil and Gas Arena	—	—
25 April 2016	Liverpool	England	Echo Arena Liverpool	—	—
27 April 2016	Leeds	England	First Direct Arena	—	—
29 April 2016	Birmingham	England	Genting Arena	—	—
30 April 2016	Bournemouth	England	Bournemouth International Centre	—	—
North America
1 July 2016	Atlanta	United States	The Tabernacle	—	—
2 July 2016	Nashville	United States	Ryman Auditorium	—	—
5 July 2016	New York City	United States	Beacon Theatre	—	—
6 July 2016	Lewiston	United States	Lewiston Artpark	—	—
8 July 2016	Ottawa	Canada	LeBreton Flats	— (Note: The 8 July 2016 concert in Ottawa is a part of Ottawa Bluesfest.)	
9 July 2016	Montreal	Canada	Salle Wilfrid-Pelletier	— (Note: The 9 July 2016 concert in Montreal is a part of the Montreal International Jazz Festival.)	
10 July 2016	Toronto	Canada	TD Echo Beach	—	—
12 July 2016 (Note: The 12 and 13 July 2016 concerts are co-headlined with Ryan Adams.)	Rochester Hills	United States	Meadow Brook Amphitheatre	—	—
13 July 2016	Pittsburgh	United States	Stage AE	2,984 / 5,200	$117,511
14 July 2016	Pemberton	Canada	Mount Currie Festival Grounds	— (Note: The 14 July 2016 concert in Pemberton is a part of Pemberton Music Festival.)	
15 July 2016	Columbus	United States	Arena District	— (Note: The 15 July 2016 concert in Columbus is a part of PromoWest Fest.)	
Europe
30 July 2016	Pikehall	England	Mouldridge Lane	— (Note: The 30 July 2016 concert in Kendal is a part of Y Not Festival.)	
31 July 2016	Kendal	England	Lowther Deer Park	— (Note: The 29 July 2016 concert in Kendal is a part of Kendal Calling.)	
3 August 2016	Scarborough	England	Scarborough Open Air Theatre	—	—
4 August 2016	Lytham	England	Proms Arena	— (Note: The 4 August 2016 concert in Lytham is a part of Lytham Festival.)	
11 August 2016	Copenhagen	Denmark	Koncerthuset	—	—
12 August 2016	Salzhausen	Germany	Luhmuhlen Festival Grounds	— (Note: The 12 August 2016 concert in Salzhausen is a part of A Summer's Tale Festival.)	
13 August 2016	Berlin	Germany	Postbahnhof am Ostbahnhof	— (Note: The 13 August 2016 concert in Berlin is a part of Pure & Crafted Festival.)	
15 August 2016	Budapest	Hungary	Hajógyári Island	— (Note: The 15 August 2016 concert in Budapest is a part of Sziget Festival.)	
16 August 2016	Zagreb	Croatia	Šalata	—	—
18 August 2016	Gampel-Bratsch	Switzerland	Festivalgelände Gampel	— (Note: The 18 August 2016 concert in Hasselt is a part of Open Air Gampel.)	
20 August 2016	Hasselt	Belgium	Kempische Steenweg	— (Note: The 20 August 2016 concert in Hasselt is a part of Pukkelpop.)	
21 August 2016	Biddinghuizen	Netherlands	Evenemententerrein	— (Note: The 21 August 2016 concert in Biddinghuizen is a part of Lowlands.)	
23 August 2016	Belfast	Northern Ireland	Custom House Square	— (Note: The 23 August 2016 concert in Belfast is a part of Belsonic.)	
26 August 2016	Glasgow	Scotland	Bellahouston Park	— (Note: The 26 August 2016 concert in Glasgow is a part of Glasgow Summer Sessions.)	
28 August 2016	Portsmouth	England	Southeast Seafront	— (Note: The 28 August 2016 concert in Portsmouth is a part of Victorious Festival.)	
2 September 2016	Swansea	Wales	Singleton Park	—	—
3 September 2016	Stradbally	Ireland	Stradbally Hall	— (Note: The 3 September 2016 concert in Stradbally is a part of the Electric Picnic festival.)	
4 September 2016	Portmerion	Wales	Porthmadog	— (Note: The 4 September 2016 concert in Portmerion is a part of Festival No. 6.)	
6 September 2016	London	England	O_{2} Academy Brixton	—	—
TOTAL				81,477 / 87,463 (93%)	$5,339,093

=== Cancellations and rescheduled shows ===
25 May 2015	Mexico City	Teatro Metropólitan	Cancelled due to illness.
17 March 2016	Asunción	Hipódromo de Asunción (Asunciónico Festival)	Festival cancelled due to logistical issues.
24 March 2016	Auckland	ASB Theatre	Cancelled due to logistical issues.

== Personnel ==
- Noel Gallagher – lead vocals, rhythm guitar
- Mike Rowe – keyboards
- Russell Pritchard – bass, backing vocals
- Tim Smith – lead guitar, backing vocals
- Jeremy Stacey – drums (until 30 April 2016)
- Chris Sharrock – drums (from 1 July 2016)
