= Where the City Meets the Sky – Chasing Yesterday: The Remixes =

Remix album by Noel Gallagher's High Flying Birds
- Released: 25 September 2015
- Genre: Alternative dance
- Length: 70:55
- Label: Sour Mash
- Producer: Noel Gallagher

Noel Gallagher's High Flying Birds chronology
Chasing Yesterday (2015)	Where the City Meets the Sky – Chasing Yesterday: The Remixes (2015)	Who Built the Moon? (2017)

Singles from Chasing Yesterday
- 1. "In the Heat of the Moment (Remix)" Released: 18 April 2015

Where the City Meets the Sky – Chasing Yesterday: The Remixes is a remix album by English rock band Noel Gallagher's High Flying Birds on 25 September 2015 the album compiles all the official remixes from Chasing Yesterday, including work from Erol Alkan (under the alias name Beyond Wizard's Sleeve), Andrew Weatherall, Toydrum, Massive Attack's 3D, and David Holmes (who later produced the next album).

== Track listing ==
=== Digital version ===
All tracks are written by Noel Gallagher

No.	Title	Remix	Length
1.	"Ballad of the Mighty I"	Beyond The Wizard's Sleeve Re-Animation	7:12
2.	"In the Heat of the Moment"	Andrew Weatherall Remix	7:52
3.	"Riverman"	Beyond The Wizard's Sleeve Re-Animation	6:55
4.	"The Right Stuff"	Psychemagik Remix	6:51
5.	"The Right Stuff"	3D version 1	5:33
6.	"The Girl With the X-Ray Eyes"	David Holmes Rework	5:27
7.	"In the Heat of the Moment"	Toydrum Dub Remix	5:58
Total length:			45:48

=== Physical version ===
All tracks are written by Noel Gallagher

No.	Title	Remix	Length
1.	"Ballad of the Mighty I"	Beyond The Wizard's Sleeve Re-Animation	7:12
2.	"Ballad of the Mighty I"	Beyond The Wizard's Sleeve Re-Animation Instrumental	7:12
3.	"In the Heat of the Moment"	Andrew Weatherall Remix	7:52
4.	"Riverman"	Beyond The Wizard's Sleeve Re-Animation	6:55
5.	"Riverman"	Beyond The Wizard's Sleeve Re-Animation Instrumental	6:55
6.	"The Right Stuff"	Psychemagik Remix	6:51
7.	"The Right Stuff"	3D version 1	5:33
8.	"The Right Stuff"	3D version 2	5:33
9.	"The Girl With the X-Ray Eyes"	David Holmes Rework	5:27
10.	"The Girl With the X-Ray Eyes"	David Holmes Rework Instrumental	5:27
11.	"In the Heat of the Moment"	Toydrum Remix	5:58
Total length:			70:55
