= Jessica Greenfield =

British musician

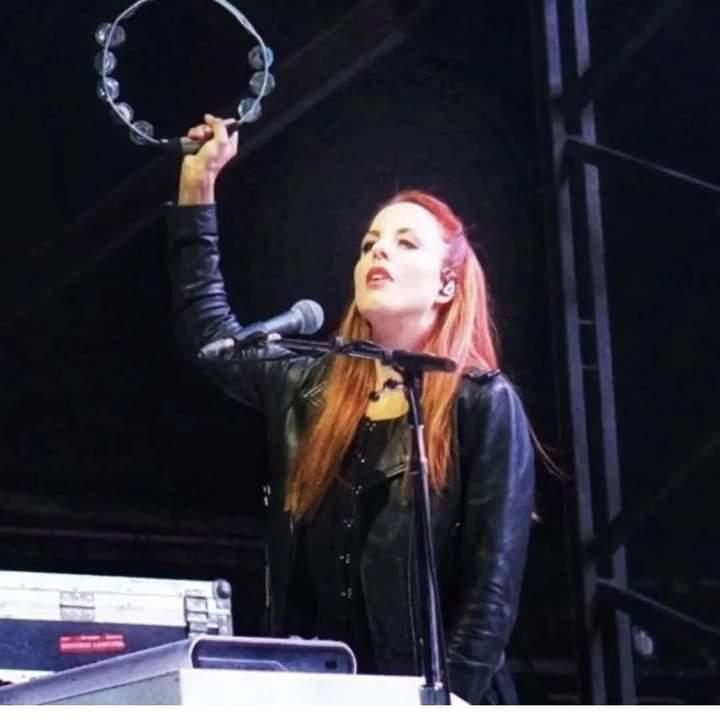
- Greenfield performing with Noel Gallagher's High Flying Birds in 2023

Background information
- Also known as: Jessica Darling
- Occupations: Musician, songwriter, producer
- Instruments: Vocals; keyboards; percussion
- Years active: 2003–present
- Member of: Noel Gallagher's High Flying Birds
- Spouse: Gavin Conder
- Website: jessgreenfieldmusic.com

Jessica Greenfield is an English singer/multi-instrumentalist and songwriter. She is best known as a member of Noel Gallagher's High Flying Birds as well as for being a musician in her own right - as a member of English jazz hip-hop group The Herbaliser under a pseudonym of Jessica Darling, recording vocals on their album Same as It Never Was; as one half of The Kondoors; and as part of London-based soul ensemble Wonder 45. In 2025, she was announced as a touring member for Oasis for their 2025 reunion tour.

== Noel Gallagher's High Flying Birds ==
Greenfield has been a member of Noel Gallagher's High Flying Birds in recent years, providing backing vocals, keyboard and tambourine on the Stranded on the Earth world tour which commenced in February 2018 in support of the Who Built The Moon LP, eventually totalling 123 shows.

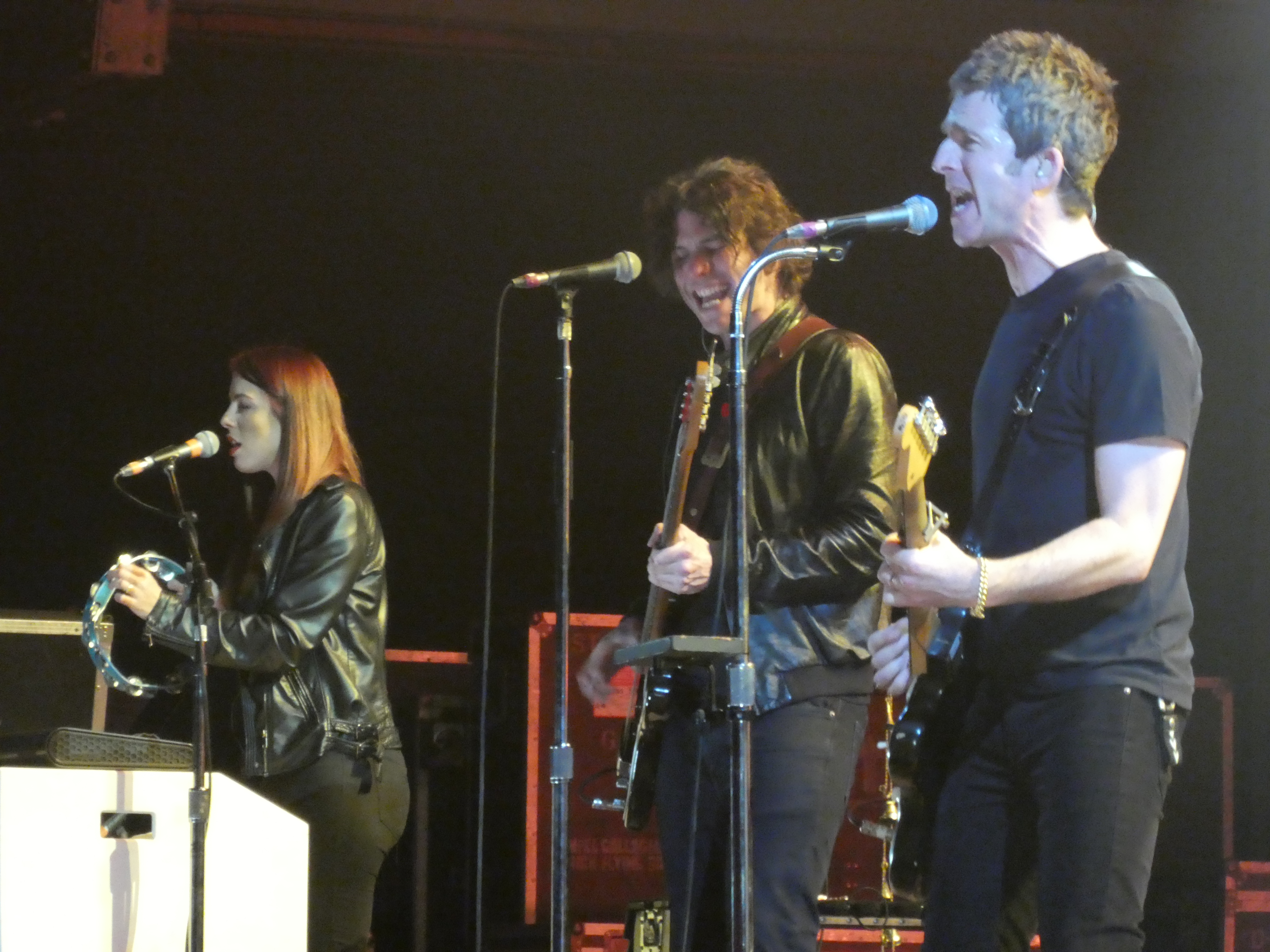
Greenfield, Russell Pritchard and Noel Gallagher performing in 2018.

In support of Noel Gallagher's High Flying Birds' subsequent Council Skies LP, on which she contributed backing vocals to 10 tracks including singles Pretty Boy, Dead To The World, Council Skies, and Open The Door, See What You Find, Greenfield joined the band for further touring, starting with Stateside dates which saw them co-headlining with Garbage from June 2023.

Greenfield's other High Flying Birds studio credits include the band's This Is The Place EP.

In 2019, she told Rolling Stone magazine that "Noel and the guys are amazing. Getting to travel the world and play in front of thousands of people is a real dream come true."

== Work with other artists ==
Across the past two decades, Greenfield has worked with many artists including Paul Weller, John Illsley (Dire Straits), Rod Stewart, Steve Van Zandt (E Street Band), Rudimental, and Take That.

== Own compositions ==
Greenfield is also one half of Indie soul duo The Kondoors alongside husband Gavin Conder. While they first met in 2003 through mutual friends, the couple later became a performing duo. Mick Brown of Telegraph Magazine called them: "Two voices pitched in perfect harmony to create blue-eyed soul and sophisticated, grown-up pop that echoes Michael McDonald and Hall & Oates."

Greenfield and Conder funded both their first EP and the recording of their debut album at Monnow Valley studios in Monmouthshire, Wales.

Their debut single released in 2018 was called "Postcards" and their debut four-track EP Fallen Angel followed in 2019, launched on 25 September at St Pancras Old Church, London. According to Greenfield: “We wrote it about how love can set you free from feeling lost. It’s a song about hope really.”

After signing to UK label Fabyl Records, The Kondoors' debut album Glorious was given a five-star review and named Album of the Month by Music Republic Magazine in October 2021.

The album, produced by long-term Noel Gallagher collaborator Paul Stacey and recorded live with a nine-piece band in three days, was preceded by lead-off single Good Times which Rolling Stone India said "blends together the best of rock, funk and soul."

Alongside her husband, Greenfield is also part of retro soul collective Wonder 45, a six-piece soul and rhythm & blues band. Their debut single Wonderland was released in May 2022. Blues & Soul Magazine called it, "A slow building, supreme slice of vintage soul washed in reverb and adorned with heavy, fat and imperious horns."

Second single Cry was released in November 2023 and received airplay on the Zoe Ball Breakfast Show on 4 December 2023. The show's host called it "gorgeous" and said that an album entitled Wonderland will follow in 2024. It was also played on the Craig Charles Funk and Soul Show on BBC Radio 6 on 9 December 2023 as part of a tribute to Benjamin Zephaniah. The host said he would be "keeping a close eye on this London outfit." Cry was then added to BBC Radio 2's New Music Playlist for early 2024.

Wonder 45 played their debut gig on 29 January 2024 at London's 606 Club.

Rolling Stone India reviewed subsequent single Superman, calling it "a masterclass in musical dynamics, effortlessly blending the earthy grit of blues with the driving force of rock" including "powerhouse" vocals from Greenfield delivered with "a raw intensity".

House of Coco further called Make It Happen "an effervescent, groove-laden track that is steeped in liberation and self-belief".

Everything Flows said debut LP Wonderland will be released on 31 May via Big-AC Records and the band's singles so far were "culminating in what is already sure to be an instant classic debut LP".

Greenfield has various other songwriting credits including TV productions Love Island and The X Factor.

She was nominated in the Best Wildcard Production Music Track category of the Production Music Awards 2022 for This Is It/The Home of Happy alongside Holley Gray.

== Personal life ==
Greenfield believes that the music industry "either fuels ego or fuels depression" and endorses the Music Minds Matter charity as a means of support.
