= Wandering star =

Wandering star refers to the classical planets: the word 'planet' comes from the Greek word πλανήτης (planētēs), meaning 'wanderer'.

Wandering star may also refer to:

== Literature ==
- Wandering Star (novel) (Étoile errante), a 1992 novel by French author J. M. G. Le Clézio
- Wandering Stars (Aleichem novel), a novel by Sholem Aleichem serialized in Warsaw newspapers (1909–1911)
- Wandering Stars (anthology), a 1974 anthology of Jewish science fiction and fantasy
- Wandering Stars (Orange novel), a 2024 novel by Tommy Orange

== Music ==
- "Wand'rin' Star", a song from the 1951 Broadway musical comedy Paint Your Wagon
- "Wandering Star", a song by Noel Gallagher's High Flying Birds
- "Wandering Star", a song by Portishead from their 1994 album Dummy
- "Wandering Star", a song by Lisa Gerrard from her 2006 album The Silver Tree
- "Wandering Star", a song by Empire of the Sun from 2014 written for the film Dumb and Dumber To

== Other ==
- Wandering Stars, the series of paintings by Russian artist Igor Kalinauskas (2005)
- Wandering Stars, a reference to false teachers which were misleading Christians in Jude 1:13
- Wandering Stars (film), 1927 Soviet Ukrainian film

== See also ==
- Shooting star (disambiguation)
