= Blue Moon Rising (song) =

2020 single by Noel Gallagher's High Flying Birds

Single by Noel Gallagher's High Flying Birds

from the album Blue Moon Rising EP
- Released: 30 January 2020
- Genre: dance rock; alternative dance; alternative rock; dark music
- Length: 3:43
- Label: Sour Mash
- Songwriter(s): Noel Gallagher

Noel Gallagher's High Flying Birds singles chronology
"Wandering Star" (2019)	"Blue Moon Rising" (2020)	"Come On Outside" (2020)

"Blue Moon Rising" is a song by the English rock band Noel Gallagher's High Flying Birds, written by frontman Noel Gallagher from their third EP Blue Moon Rising (2020). It was released as the second single.

== Background ==
Gallagher has said in a statement: “How it manages to combine the influences of Metallica, The Jesters of Malice, Mantovani, Robinson Crusoe as well as Bob Marley AND The Wailers is literally beyond me… oh, and it’s not about City by the way.” Blue Moon Rising has been compared to Hounds of Love by Kate Bush.

== Music video ==
The music video was released on 30 January 2020 and it was filmed at the Scala in London by Dan Cadan and Scully. It features the actress Gala Gordon and the actors Jack O’Connell and James Nelson-Joyce and Noel Gallagher himself in a cinematic setting.
