= If Love Is the Law =

Single by Noel Gallagher's High Flying Birds

from the album Who Built the Moon?
- B-side: "Alone on the Rope"
- Released: 17 August 2018
- Genre: Rock
- Length: 3:25
- Label: Sour Mash
- Songwriter(s): Noel Gallagher
- Producer(s): David Holmes

Noel Gallagher's High Flying Birds singles chronology
"She Taught Me How to Fly" (2017)	"If Love Is the Law" (2018)	"Black Star Dancing" (2019)

"If Love Is the Law" is a song by English rock band Noel Gallagher's High Flying Birds. Written by frontman Noel Gallagher, it was released on 12" limited edition picture disc & coloured vinyl on 21 September 2018 as the fourth and final single from the band's third studio album Who Built the Moon? (2017). It was heavily influenced by the song "The Conqueror" by Genesis, which appeared on their debut album From Genesis to Revelation.

== Music video ==
The official video for "If Love Is the Law", directed by Mike Brue. The video is the fifth chapter of the seven part film Stranded on the Earth and hones in on the end of a young couple's relationship in the American Southwest. The video doubles as a standalone music video as well as a trailer for Stranded on the Earth. "If Love Is the Law" was released on the band's Vevo account on 19 July 2018.

== Track listing ==
12"

All tracks are written by Noel Gallagher.

No.	Title	Length
1.	"If Love Is the Law"	3:25
2.	"If Love Is the Law – Instrumental"	3:25
3.	"Alone on the Rope"	5:05
Total length:		13:55

Digital

All tracks are written by Noel Gallagher.

No.	Title	Length
1.	"If Love Is The Law"	3:25
2.	"Alone on the Rope"	5:05
Total length:		8:30

== Charts ==
Chart (2018)	Peak position
Scotland (OCC)	19
