= She Taught Me How to Fly =

Song by Noel Gallagher's High Flying Birds

Single by Noel Gallagher's High Flying Birds

from the album Who Built the Moon?
- B-side: "She Taught Me How To Fly (Justin Robertson's Deadstock 33s Remix)"
- Released: 25 May 2018
- Genre: Rock
- Length: 5:02
- Label: Sour Mash
- Songwriter(s): Noel Gallagher
- Producer(s): David Holmes

Noel Gallagher's High Flying Birds singles chronology
"It's a Beautiful World" (2017)	"She Taught Me How to Fly" (2018)	"If Love Is the Law" (2018)

"She Taught Me How to Fly" is a song by English rock band Noel Gallagher's High Flying Birds. Written by frontman Noel Gallagher, it was released on 25 May 2018 as the third single from the band's third studio album Who Built the Moon? (2017).

== Music video ==
The official video for "She Taught Me How to Fly" was directed by Julian House. The video has a psychedelic feel and features Gallagher taking centre stage as he performs the song. The video also features a series of silhouettes. "She Taught Me How to Fly" was released on the band's Vevo account on 6 April 2018.

== Track listing ==
12"

All tracks are written by Noel Gallagher

No.	Title	Length
1.	"She Taught Me How to Fly"	5:02
2.	"She Taught Me How to Fly – Instrumental"	5:02
3.	"She Taught Me How To Fly (Justin Robertson's Deadstock 33s Remix)"	7:57
Total length:		18:01

Digital

All tracks are written by Noel Gallagher

No.	Title	Length
1.	"She Taught Me How to Fly"	5:02
2.	"She Taught Me How To Fly (Justin Robertson's Deadstock 33s Remix)"	7:57
Total length:		12:59

== Charts ==
Chart (2018)	Peak position
Scotland (OCC)	18
UK Singles (OCC)	71
