= Holy Mountain (song) =

Single by Noel Gallagher's High Flying Birds

from the album Who Built the Moon?
- B-side: "Dead in the Water (Live at RTÉ 2FM Studios, Dublin)"
- Released: 9 October 2017
- Genre: Psychedelic rock, glam rock
- Length: 3:55
- Label: Sour Mash
- Songwriter(s): Noel Gallagher
- Producer(s): David Holmes

Noel Gallagher's High Flying Birds singles chronology
"The Dying of the Light" (2015)	"Holy Mountain" (2017)	"It's a Beautiful World" (2017)

"Holy Mountain" is a song by English rock band Noel Gallagher's High Flying Birds. Written by frontman Noel Gallagher, it was released on 9 October 2017 as the first single from the band's third studio album Who Built the Moon? (2017). The song features Paul Weller playing organ.

== Background ==
The song was premiered on its release day by British radio stations Radio X, BBC Radio 2 and Absolute Radio.

Gallagher described the song as being one of his favourite pieces of music he has ever written, saying that it sounds great live and his children love it and his friends’ children love it.

Interviewed by Radio X, Gallagher said: "Holy Mountain is about your nearest and dearest, yeah. How it came about was, one of the first sessions we did, the hook line, the tin whistle thing that is like one of the most catchiest things in the world, is a sample from a track by a brilliantly titled band from the 60s called The Ice Cream, and a track called 'Chewing Gum Kid'(1968), don't try and Google it, it's beyond obscure, you'll never find it... "

=== "Dead in the Water" ===
The single's B-side is a live acoustic version of "Dead in the Water", recorded at RTÉ 2FM Studios in Dublin, Ireland in between takes of then-current single "The Dying of the Light". Gallagher recounted; "I had just written ["Dead in the Water"] a couple nights before and they were messing about, moving microphones around and it sounded so good in my headphones that I just started to sing that song. I had no idea it was being recorded, right? No idea at all." He then said that when his team were looking for bonus material to include on 2017's Who Built the Moon?, someone suggested including that performance of "Dead in the Water". Gallagher said of the performance, "that is such a special moment in time, and I might never re-record that because it's such a personal moment for me. And it's live, and it's as bare naked as you can get. And it was a brand new song, and it really is a great tune."

When asked in 2021 why he had not released a studio version of "Dead in the Water", Gallagher said he took a play out of Neil Young's playbook, mimicking how Young has never released a studio recording of "Hey Hey, My My (Into the Black)". Gallagher did reveal that he attempted a studio recording of the song with an orchestra for the 2021 compilation Back the Way We Came: Vol 1 (2011–2021), but ultimately scrapped the idea.

== Music video ==
The official video for "Holy Mountain", directed by Julian House and using the original cameras from Top of the Pops in the 1970s, was released on the band's Vevo account on 11 October 2017.

The video sees the band in a room filled with coloured lights and also features animated scenes.

== Reception ==
The NME described the song as "a jaunty and vibrant, horn-driven, arena-ready number – with elements of the Vaccines latter day work to its sound.

== Charts ==
Chart (2017)	Peak position
France (SNEP)	133
Japan (Billboard)	77
Scotland (OCC)	10
UK Singles (OCC)	31

== Certifications ==
Region	Certification	Certified units/sales
United Kingdom (BPI)	Silver	200,000^{‡}
^{‡} Sales+streaming figures based on certification alone.
