= It's a Beautiful World =

Single by Noel Gallagher's High Flying Birds

from the album Who Built the Moon?
- B-side: "God Help Us All – Demo"
- Released: 17 November 2017
- Genre: Psychedelic rock
- Length: 5:17
- Label: Sour Mash
- Songwriter: Noel Gallagher
- Producer: David Holmes

Noel Gallagher's High Flying Birds singles chronology
"Holy Mountain" (2017)	"It's a Beautiful World" (2017)	"She Taught Me How to Fly" (2018)

"It's a Beautiful World" is a song by English rock band Noel Gallagher's High Flying Birds. Written by frontman Noel Gallagher, it was released on 17 November 2017 as the second single from the band's third studio album Who Built the Moon? (2017).

== Music video ==
The official video for "It's a Beautiful World", directed by Julian House. The video features Gallagher and his band performing in the studio with grainy stock film as well as a montage of archival footage which give the video a sixties feel. "It's a Beautiful World" was released on the band's Vevo account on 26 January 2018.

== Personnel ==
- Noel Gallagher – guitars and vocals
- Samuel Dixon – bass
- Keefus Ciancia – keyboards
- Emre Ramazanoglu – drums
- Pete Lockett – percussion
- Charlotte Courbe a.k.a. Le Volume Courbe – French spoken word
- David Holmes – programming

== Track listing ==
12"

All tracks are written by Noel Gallagher.

No.	Title	Length
1.	"It's A Beautiful World"	5:17
2.	"It's A Beautiful World – Instrumental"	5:17
3.	"God Help Us All – Demo"	3:35
Total length:		14:09

Digital

All tracks are written by Noel Gallagher.

No.	Title	Length
1.	"It's A Beautiful World – Radio Edit"	3:47
2.	"God Help Us All – Demo"	3:35
Total length:		7:22

== Charts ==
Chart (2017)	Peak position
Scotland Singles (OCC)	19
UK Singles (OCC)	77
