= Songs from the Great White North... =

EP by Noel Gallagher's High Flying Birds
- Released: 21 April 2012
- Recorded: 2010–2011 at State of the Ark, Strangeways, Dean St. and Abbey Road, London
- Genre: Alternative rock
- Length: 18:29
- Label: Sour Mash
- Producers: Noel Gallagher, Amorphous Androgynous

Noel Gallagher's High Flying Birds chronology
Noel Gallagher's High Flying Birds (2011)	Songs from the Great White North... (2012)	Chasing Yesterday (2015)

Songs from the Great White North... is the first extended play (EP) by English rock band Noel Gallagher's High Flying Birds. Released on 21 April 2012 as part of the Record Store Day celebrations, the EP includes the B-sides from the band's first four singles, "The Death of You and Me", "AKA... What a Life!", "If I Had a Gun...", and "Dream On".

== Track listing ==
All songs written and composed by Noel Gallagher, except where noted.

1. "The Good Rebel" – 4:20
2. "Let the Lord Shine a Light on Me" – 4:10
3. "I'd Pick You Every Time" – 2:06
4. "Shoot a Hole into the Sun" (Gallagher, Garry Cobain, Brian Dougans) – 7:53

== Personnel ==
Musical personnel

- Noel Gallagher – vocals, guitars, bass, production (tracks 1, 2 and 3)
- Mike Rowe – keyboards
- Jeremy Stacey – drums

Production personnel

- Paul Stacey – engineering (tracks 1, 2 and 3), mixing
- Amorphous Androgynous – production (track 4)

Graphics personnel

- Julian House – design
- Lawrence Watson – photography
- Julie Patterson – photography
