= Who Built the Moon? =

Studio album by Noel Gallagher's High Flying Birds
- Released: 24 November 2017
- Recorded: 2013–2017
- Studios: Drama Studios (Belfast); Hoxa HQ, The Pool, Strangeways (London)
- Genres: Psychedelic rock; pop rock; glam rock
- Length: 43:25
- Label: Sour Mash
- Producer: David Holmes

Noel Gallagher's High Flying Birds chronology
Where the City Meets the Sky – Chasing Yesterday: The Remixes (2015)	Who Built the Moon? (2017)	Black Star Dancing EP (2019)

Singles from Who Built the Moon?
- 1. "Holy Mountain" Released: 9 October 2017; 2. "It's a Beautiful World" Released: 17 November 2017; 3. "She Taught Me How to Fly" Released: 25 May 2018; 4. "If Love Is the Law" Released: 17 August 2018

Who Built the Moon? is the third studio album by English rock band Noel Gallagher's High Flying Birds. Produced by David Holmes, it was released on 24 November 2017, through Gallagher's label Sour Mash Records, just a month after younger brother and former Oasis bandmate Liam released his debut solo album. Four singles were released from the album; "Holy Mountain", "It's a Beautiful World", "She Taught Me How to Fly" and "If Love Is the Law".

The album received generally positive reviews from critics, who praised the album's psychedelic experimentation and progression from the band's previous albums. It was also a commercial success, becoming Gallagher's 10th consecutive UK number one album with both the band and Oasis, becoming the first artist to reach the landmark of 10 consecutive UK number one albums.

== Background ==
Who Built the Moon? was a work in progress since Chasing Yesterday was being recorded. Gallagher stated in interviews that album was being recorded not only during those sessions but also during the Chasing Yesterday Tour. The album was announced on 25 September 2017 through Gallagher's social media accounts, alongside the Stranded on the Earth World Tour which was to commence in 2018. In an interview with Colombian DJ Alejandro Marín, Gallagher revealed that the woman on the album's cover is his then-wife Sara MacDonald. This is the last album to feature drummer Jeremy Stacey as a full time member, as he left the band in 2016 during the album's recording to join King Crimson (though Stacey would still contribute to the band's following album, Council Skies). He was temporarily replaced by Emre Ramazanoglu to finish the album, before Chris Sharrock joined as the band's new full time drummer.

== Singles ==
On 9 October 2017, the song "Holy Mountain" was released as the first single. The single contained the B-side "Dead in the Water", which has become one of the band's signature themes since the album's release. On 17 November 2017, "It's a Beautiful World" was released as the second single from the album, it contained the B-side "God Help Us All", a demo recorded over a decade earlier from when Oasis were still together. On 6 April 2018, "She Taught Me How to Fly" was announced as the third single from the album, and released on 25 May with a coinciding music video. The single was the only track from the album released as a single to not contain an original lyrical song, instead a remix by frequent collaborator of Gallagher, Justin Robertson. "If Love Is the Law" was the 4th single to be released from the album on 17 August 2018, with the last B-side to be released as "Alone on the Rope".

== Critical reception ==
Professional ratings
Aggregate scores
Source	Rating
AnyDecentMusic?	6.9/10
Metacritic	76/100
Review scores
Source	Rating
AllMusic	4.5/5 stars
The A.V. Club	C+
The Guardian	4/5 stars
The Independent	4/5 stars
NME	4/5 stars
Pitchfork	7.1/10
Q	4/5 stars
Rolling Stone	3.5/5 stars
The Times	4/5 stars
Uncut	7/10

Who Built the Moon? received acclaim from music critics. On Metacritic, which assigns a normalised rating out of 100 to reviews from mainstream critics, the album received an average score of 76 based on 20 reviews, indicating "generally favorable reviews". Many reviews praised the album's experimentation and its progression from the typical sound of Gallagher's previous works.

Stephen Thomas Erlewine of AllMusic gave the album a very positive review, noting that "There is a certain rush hearing him opt for glam, psychedelia, and candied pop instead of respectable strumming. Once that initial rush fades, the album is still satisfying due to its impeccable execution. Noel knows how to construct a sturdy song and Holmes knows how to dress them up in flashy clothes, and the combination results in Gallagher's best album since splitting up Oasis." The Times gave the album a positive four-star review, saying "This sounds like the work of a man who has been micro-dosing LSD. And listening to a lot of Chemical Brothers and Primal Scream albums while he's at it. This isn't a groundbreaking epic, but more for middle-aged mods — brimming with cool references and psychedelic on a modest level." The Guardian wrote that "The third record from Noel Gallagher's solo outfit is, according to the ex-Oasis man, merely him in 'more colourful clothes'. Brightness is certainly the first thing that strikes you about Who Built the Moon, an album that cloaks Gallagher's hardy guitar-pop in glowing Smithsian riffs, tin whistle samples from novelty 60s tunes and a heady fug of riotous glam rock. Particular highlights include the gloriously Slade-esque Holy Mountain and the singalong-friendly Black and White Sunshine, which resembles Oasis basking on a sun lounger. Even the fact that the album regularly recalls some of the duller post-Britpop bands – It's a Beautiful World is basically an Elbow track backed by a breakbeat – can't dampen the joy that rings out from every corner. Producer David Holmes may be responsible for Noel's change of pace, but the vibrancy and strains of psychedelia never feel like intruders: instead, they act as the perfect foil for the record’s blissed-out lyrics about life-changing love."

The A.V. Club were mixed in their C+ review, saying: "Whereas his brother Liam turned a bit inward on his recent solo debut, Noel Gallagher, unsurprisingly, is doing the opposite. His third solo album with the High Flying Birds, Who Built The Moon?, turns everything up to 11, hardly ever dropping down to add a necessary level of drama, or even basic tension. It's like an extremely amped-up version of Oasis, but the excesses sway from impressive to taxing. Often the effort to be interesting just comes off as nonsensical cacophony, like the alarm-clock ring in 'Fort Knox' or the French dialogue at the end of 'It's A Beautiful World.' Although Gallagher can still capture the hooks that elude lesser songwriters, they nearly get lost in his orchestral overages. 'Black & White Sunshine' seems to have at least three superlative songs in it, while 'If Love Is The Law' piles on sleigh bells, harmonica, and strings to its plaintive romantic plea, which can barely be heard by the time the chorus crescendos. Bonus track 'Dead In The Water' offers Gallagher's sentimental vocals with just acoustic guitar and piano, and underlines what's so off about the rest of the album: He may be having fun layering a multitude of tracks in the studio, but the truth is he doesn't need them."

In July, the album was nominated for the 2018 Mercury Prize, Gallagher's first placing on the award's shortlist since Oasis' (What's the Story) Morning Glory? in 1995.

== Commercial performance ==
Who Built the Moon? debuted at number one on the UK Albums Chart with 78,000 album-equivalent units, making it Gallagher's 10th consecutive number one studio album, as part of both Oasis and Noel Gallagher's High Flying Birds.

== Track listing ==
All tracks are written by Noel Gallagher.

No.	Title	Length
1.	"Fort Knox"	3:57
2.	"Holy Mountain" (contains elements from "Chewin' Gum Kid" by The Ice Cream)	3:54
3.	"Keep on Reaching"	3:24
4.	"It's a Beautiful World"	5:17
5.	"She Taught Me How to Fly"	5:02
6.	"Be Careful What You Wish For"	5:40
7.	"Black & White Sunshine"	3:41
8.	"Interlude (Wednesday Part 1)"	2:10
9.	"If Love Is the Law"	3:25
10.	"The Man Who Built the Moon"	4:28
11.	"End Credits (Wednesday Part 2)"	2:27
Total length:		43:25

Bonus track
No.	Title	Length
12.	"Dead in the Water" (live at RTÉ 2FM Studios, Dublin)	5:21
Total length:		48:46

Japanese bonus track
No.	Title	Length
13.	"God Help Us All"	3:37
Total length:		52:23

== Personnel ==
Noel Gallagher's High Flying Birds

- Noel Gallagher – guitars and vocals
- Jason Falkner – bass guitar (tracks 2, 3, 5–8, 10, 11)
- Jeremy Stacey – drums (tracks 2, 3, 6–11)

Additional musicians

- Paul Weller – organ (track 2)
- Keefus Ciancia – keyboards
- Johnny Marr – guitar and harmonica (track 9)
- Samuel Dixon – bass guitar (tracks 1, 4, 9)
- Emre Ramazanoglu – drums (tracks 1, 4, 5, 7), programming (tracks 2, 6, 10)
- Pete Lockett – percussion (tracks 1–4, 6, 9, 10)
- Mike Rowe – keyboards (tracks 3, 12)
- Martin Slattery – tin whistle and piano (track 2)
- Kaidi Tathum – keyboards (tracks 7, 8, 11)
- David Holmes – keyboards (track 7), programming (all tracks except 9), tape loops (tracks 2, 3, 5–8 and 11)
- Charlotte Courbe aka Le Volume Courbe – French spoken word (track 4)
- Jim Hunt – saxophone (track 2, 3)
- James SK Wān – Rhodes (tracks 5, 8)
- Dominic Glover – trumpet (track 3)
- Gabe Noel – cello (track 7)
- Rob Lewis – cello (tracks 1, 9)
- Emma Smith and Vince Sipprell – strings (track 1)

Backing vocalists

- Adelaide McKenzie
- Beverley Skeete
- Sara-Jane Skeete
- Mary Pearce
- YSÉE aka Audrey Gbaguidi
- Michelle John
- Janet Ramus
- Una McGeogh
- Georgina McGeogh

Production

- David Holmes – production
- Emre Ramazanoglu – mixing and engineering
- Tristin Norwell – additional engineering
- Paul "Strangeboy" Stacey – lead vocal recording
- John Davis – mastering

Design

- Gareth Halliday – artwork
- Sara Macdonald – artwork cover model
- David Newton – cover model photography
- Matthew Cooper – design
- Lawrence Watson – booklet photography

== Charts ==
=== Weekly charts ===
Chart (2017)	Peak position
Australian Albums (ARIA)	18
Austrian Albums (Ö3 Austria)	15
Belgian Albums (Ultratop Flanders)	17
Belgian Albums (Ultratop Wallonia)	31
Canadian Albums (Billboard)	18
Dutch Albums (Album Top 100)	21
Finnish Albums (Suomen virallinen lista)	38
French Albums (SNEP)	37
German Albums (Offizielle Top 100)	17
Irish Albums (IRMA)	2
Italian Albums (FIMI)	12
Japanese Albums (Oricon)	7
New Zealand Heatseeker Albums (RMNZ)	1
Scottish Albums (Official Charts)	1
South Korean International Albums (Gaon)	1
Spanish Albums (Promusicae)	34
Swedish Albums (Sverigetopplistan)	50
Swiss Albums (Schweizer Hitparade)	9
UK Albums (Official Charts)	1
UK Independent Albums (Official Charts)	1
US Billboard 200	48
US Independent Albums (Billboard)	2
US Top Alternative Albums (Billboard)	2
US Top Rock Albums (Billboard)	3

=== Year-end charts ===
Chart (2017)	Position
UK Albums (OCC)	19
Chart (2018)	Position
UK Albums (OCC)	74

== Certifications ==
Certifications for Who Built the Moon?
Region	Certification	Certified units/sales
United Kingdom (BPI)	Platinum	300,000^{‡}
^{‡} Sales+streaming figures based on certification alone.
