= Lock All the Doors =

Single by Noel Gallagher's High Flying Birds

from the album Chasing Yesterday
- B-side: "Here's a Candle (For Your Birthday Cake)"
- Released: 28 August 2015
- Genre: Alternative rock, psychedelic rock, power pop
- Length: 3:41
- Label: Sour Mash
- Songwriter: Noel Gallagher
- Producer: Noel Gallagher

Noel Gallagher's High Flying Birds singles chronology
"Riverman" (2015)	"Lock All the Doors" (2015)	"The Dying of the Light" (2015)

"Lock All the Doors" is a song by the English rock band Noel Gallagher's High Flying Birds. It was written and produced by Noel Gallagher for the band's second studio album Chasing Yesterday (2015). In late August 2015, the song was released as the album's fourth single.

Gallagher first wrote the chorus and one verse of the song in the 1990s but took 23 years to complete it, having given away the verse to The Chemical Brothers during the recording sessions for "Setting Sun". After struggling to rewrite a verse to fit with the chorus in the years that followed, Gallagher has stated the melody for the verse suddenly came to him "without even thinking about it", when leaving a Tesco Metro on a Sunday evening in 2014. The chorus originally surfaced on an Oasis demo tape from 1992 as a song that later became "My Sister Lover", a B-side to "Stand by Me".

A variant of the song, with the same chorus but old verses that surfaced in the pre-Definitely Maybe Oasis demo, was performed by Liam Gallagher on his Definitely Maybe tour in 2024.

== Track listing ==
All tracks are written by Noel Gallagher.

No.	Title	Length
1.	"Lock All the Doors"	3:41
2.	"Here's a Candle (For Your Birthday Cake)"	3:06
Total length:		6:47

== Charts ==
=== Weekly charts ===
Chart (2015)	Peak position
Scotland Singles (OCC)	47
UK Indie (OCC)	6
