= Black Star Dancing EP =

Black Star Dancing

EP by Noel Gallagher's High Flying Birds
- Released: 14 June 2019
- Studio: Abbey Road, London
- Length: 26:00
- Label: Sour Mash
- Producer: Noel Gallagher

Noel Gallagher's High Flying Birds chronology
Who Built the Moon? (2017)	Black Star Dancing (2019)	This Is The Place EP (2019)

Singles from Black Star Dancing
- 1. "Black Star Dancing" Released: 2 May 2019

Black Star Dancing is the second extended play (EP) by English rock band Noel Gallagher's High Flying Birds. It was released on 14 June 2019 on 12" black vinyl, 12" picture disc, 12" pink vinyl as well as digital download and on all streaming services.

The EP features the title track and lead single "Black Star Dancing" along with two new tracks "Rattling Rose" and "Sail On".

== Background ==
"Black Star Dancing" was written by Gallagher during a studio session when he wasn't happy with other material. Gallagher said, "There's a Bowie influence in the tune itself." The song is also influenced by INXS, U2, Queen, Indeep and ZZ Top.

== Singles ==
"Black Star Dancing" was released on 2 May 2019 followed by the music video for the single on 7 May 2019. The video is 70's inspired and features Gallagher performing on stage at a social club. The band are introduced to the stage by late comedian Bernard Manning. The vintage footage in the video comes from the ITV variety show The Wheeltappers and Shunters Social Club, which was compered by Manning and broadcast between 1974 and 1977, and also includes late comedian Colin Crompton watching from the audience.

== Track listing ==
12" and Digital

All tracks are written by Noel Gallagher

No.	Title	Length
1.	"Black Star Dancing"	4:21
2.	"Rattling Rose"	3:34
3.	"Sail On"	4:02
4.	"Black Star Dancing" (12" Mix)	4:39
5.	"Black Star Dancing" (The Reflex Revision)	10:04
Total length:		26:00
