= Riverman (song) =

2015 single by Noel Gallagher's High Flying Birds

Single by Noel Gallagher's High Flying Birds

from the album Chasing Yesterday
- B-side: "Leave My Guitar Alone"
- Released: 11 May 2015
- Genre: Rock; alternative rock; psychedelic rock
- Length: 5:41
- Label: Sour Mash
- Songwriter(s): Noel Gallagher
- Producer(s): Noel Gallagher

Noel Gallagher's High Flying Birds singles chronology
"Ballad of the Mighty I" (2015)	"Riverman" (2015)	"Lock All the Doors" (2015)

"Riverman" is a song by the English rock band Noel Gallagher's High Flying Birds. It was written and produced by Noel Gallagher. The track was released on 11 May 2015 as the third single from the band's second studio album Chasing Yesterday (2015).

== Track listing ==
All tracks are written by Noel Gallagher

No.	Title	Length
1.	"Riverman"	5:41
2.	"Leave My Guitar Alone"	3:09
Total length:		8:50

== Charts ==
=== Weekly charts ===
Chart (2015)	Peak position
Scotland (OCC)	38
UK Singles (OCC)	70
