= In the Heat of the Moment =

2014 single by Noel Gallagher's High Flying Birds

Single by Noel Gallagher's High Flying Birds

from the album Chasing Yesterday
- B-side: "Do the Damage"
- Released: 17 November 2014
- Genre: Alternative rock
- Length: 3:29
- Label: Sour Mash
- Songwriter: Noel Gallagher
- Producer: Noel Gallagher

Noel Gallagher's High Flying Birds singles chronology
"Everybody's on the Run" (2012)	"In the Heat of the Moment" (2014)	"Ballad of the Mighty I" (2015)

"In the Heat of the Moment" is a song by the English rock band Noel Gallagher's High Flying Birds. Written and produced by eponymous frontman Noel Gallagher, it was released on 17 November 2014 as the first single from the band's second studio album, Chasing Yesterday (2015).

== Background ==
Written and produced by Gallagher, "In the Heat of the Moment" was the last song to be recorded for Chasing Yesterday. It is said to be "inspired by a documentary featuring an astronaut who likened going into space for the first time to 'touching the face of God'". Spin described the track as follows: "[It] is a subtly layered track, but its steady beat imbues it with a certain amount of tension – fitting, since it is about a journey into space – and the few odd bell chimes amid the guitars invoke a subtle sense of otherworldliness." The song was revealed on 13 October 2014, shortly after the initial announcement of the new album and tour dates.

A remix of the song by artist Toydrum is featured on the cinematic trailer for Assassin's Creed Syndicate (2015).

== Music videos ==
Released on 23 October 2014, the music video for "In the Heat of the Moment" was directed by Ollie Murray. The video sees the band in a room filled with coloured lights. The style of the video has been compared to that of a number of Oasis songs, including "The Shock of the Lightning" by website PopMatters, and the United States version of "Live Forever" by magazine Spin, who described it as a "hazy, washed-out clip".

The B-side, "Do the Damage" also received a music video on 25 November 2014. It sees Noel observing a roller skate rivalry, and features Devon Ogden who starred in the video for "The Death of You and Me".

== Critical reception ==
Spin magazine described it as "hypnotic", "a trip", and compared it to the 1994 Oasis album Definitely Maybe in style.

== Track listing ==
Digital

All tracks are written by Noel Gallagher.

No.	Title	Length
1.	"In the Heat of the Moment"	3:29
2.	"Do the Damage"	3:10
Total length:		6:39

12"

All tracks are written by Noel Gallagher.

No.	Title	Length
1.	"In the Heat of the Moment (Andrew Weatherall Remix)"	7:43
2.	"In the Heat of the Moment (Toydrum Dub Remix)"	5:41
Total length:		13:24

== Charts ==
Chart (2014–2015)	Peak position
Belgium (Ultratip Bubbling Under Flanders)	12
France (SNEP)	185
Ireland (IRMA)	71
Scotland Singles (OCC)	14
UK Singles (OCC)	26

== Certifications ==
Region	Certification	Certified units/sales
United Kingdom (BPI)	Gold	400,000^{‡}
^{‡} Sales+streaming figures based on certification alone.
