= Ballad of the Mighty I =

2015 single by Noel Gallagher's High Flying Birds

Single by Noel Gallagher's High Flying Birds

from the album Chasing Yesterday
- B-side: "Revolution Song"
- Released: 13 January 2015
- Genre: Rock, alternative rock, dance-rock
- Length: 5:15
- Label: Sour Mash
- Songwriter(s): Noel Gallagher
- Producer(s): Noel Gallagher

Noel Gallagher's High Flying Birds singles chronology
"In the Heat of the Moment" (2014)	"Ballad of the Mighty I" (2015)	"Riverman" (2015)

"Ballad of the Mighty I" is a song by the English rock band Noel Gallagher's High Flying Birds. Written and produced by frontman Noel Gallagher, the track features guitarist Johnny Marr and was released on 13 January 2015 as the second single from the band's second studio album, Chasing Yesterday (2015).

== Background ==
It was revealed that "Ballad of the Mighty I" would be the second single from Chasing Yesterday upon the album's announcement in October 2014. Speaking about the collaboration with Johnny Marr, Gallagher has revealed that he "tried to get him to play on the last album but it never happened", adding that Marr agreed to feature on the track without hearing it beforehand and claiming that he "helped make [Ballad of the] Mighty I one of the best songs I've ever written".

In its first week, the song charted at 75th on the official UK charts, on 1 March it reached 54th.

== Music video ==
The music video for "Ballad of the Mighty I" was released on 12 January 2015.

The video features Noel filming a video where he walks down a street and a woman runs past him. Upon catching up with the woman, Noel notices that she is wearing a sleeveless top and gives her his coat. He then walks past a clothes shop where he takes a denim jacket from a rail and puts it on. A man carrying a large case then runs past Noel, who follows after him. He finds the man unconscious on the ground with the case lying next to him. Noel takes the case and goes into a building where the video is being edited, whilst being followed by another man. Noel goes into another room and opens the case to reveal a guitar. He then takes the guitar and performs with a band whilst being watched by the man.

At the end of the video, the director approaches Noel and accidentally calls him Liam, before correcting himself and requesting a retake, to which an annoyed Noel (who is known to dislike making music videos) refuses and leaves, with the director calling after him that Chris Martin did ten takes.

== Track listing ==
All tracks are written by Noel Gallagher.

No.	Title	Length
1.	"Ballad of the Mighty I"	5:15
2.	"Revolution Song"	3:33
Total length:		8:48

== Personnel ==
- Noel Gallagher – lead vocals, guitars
- Paul Stacey – bass
- Jeremy Stacey – drums
- Mike Rowe – keyboards
- Johnny Marr – guitar
- Rosie Danvers – string arrangement
- Wired Strings – strings

== Charts ==
Chart (2015)	Peak position
CIS Airplay (TopHit)	200
Ireland (IRMA)	42
UK Singles (OCC)	54

== Certifications ==
Region	Certification	Certified units/sales
United Kingdom (BPI)	Silver	200,000^{‡}
^{‡} Sales+streaming figures based on certification alone.
