= Chasing Yesterday (album) =

Studio album by Noel Gallagher's High Flying Birds
- Released: 2 March 2015
- Recorded: 2012–2014
- Studio: Strangeways and Abbey Road, London
- Genre: Alternative rock; psychedelic rock
- Length: 43:52
- Label: Sour Mash
- Producer: Noel Gallagher

Noel Gallagher's High Flying Birds chronology
Songs from the Great White North... (2012)	Chasing Yesterday (2015)	Where the City Meets the Sky – Chasing Yesterday: The Remixes (2015)

Singles from Chasing Yesterday
- 1. "In the Heat of the Moment" Released: 17 November 2014; 2. "Ballad of the Mighty I" Released: 13 January 2015; 3. "Riverman" Released: 11 May 2015; 4. "Lock All the Doors" Released: 28 August 2015; 5. "The Dying of the Light" Released: 11 December 2015

Chasing Yesterday is the second studio album by English rock band Noel Gallagher's High Flying Birds. Written and produced by frontman Noel Gallagher, the album was recorded from 2012 to 2014 at Strangeways and Abbey Road Studios in London. It was released on 2 March 2015 by Gallagher's record label Sour Mash Records, preceded by the singles "In the Heat of the Moment" and "Ballad of the Mighty I". Chasing Yesterday topped the UK Albums Chart in its first week of release.

== Background ==
Noel Gallagher first confirmed that he was working on a follow-up to 2011's Noel Gallagher's High Flying Birds in August 2013 during an interview on sports radio station Talksport. He said, "I've got tons of songs left over from the last one. I'm writing, putting stuff together. Yeah, I'll definitely make another [album], that's for sure." In October he revealed that he was ready to start recording the album, explaining that he was "just waiting now for availabilities of my band and producers" to begin.

In February 2014, former Oasis producer Mark Coyle revealed that Gallagher had written between 50 and 60 songs for the new album, which he was in the process of "whittling down into an album". Talking about the songs, he said that "Noel's new album is fucking great", comparing it in style to the Oasis album Definitely Maybe (1994), and describing it as "seismic".

Gallagher officially announced Chasing Yesterday on 13 October 2014 at a question-and-answer event hosted by Facebook in London, revealing the album's title, release date, track listing, supporting UK tour, and first two singles.

== Recording and production ==
Gallagher's regular producer Dave Sardy was unavailable to work on Chasing Yesterday, so the album was self-produced by the High Flying Birds frontman, who stated that he "enjoyed the freedom of [producing the album] but not the responsibility".

The lead single, "In the Heat of the Moment", was the final song recorded for the album. Chasing Yesterday was completed by July 2014, but due to touring commitments and the reissues of Oasis albums it was held for release for several months, with Gallagher proclaiming that the wait was "beginning to do [his] head in".

The former Smiths guitarist Johnny Marr performed on the album's second single, "Ballad of the Mighty I". Speaking about the collaboration during the initial announcement of the album, Gallagher said, "He's a very enthusiastic artist and I tried to get him to play on 'What a Life' ... He's a truly great guitarist and he has something that nobody else has. He's amazing, a top man." Gallagher said that Marr arrived to record his part for the track without having heard a demo, and that his contribution helped make the song "one of the best" he had ever written.

== Promotion and release ==
The first music video from the album, for lead single "In the Heat of the Moment", was released on 23 October 2014. The song was released as the first single from the album on 17 November, and entered the UK Singles Chart at number 26. A music video was also released for the single's B-side, "Do the Damage", the following month. "Ballad of the Mighty I" was released as the second single and third music video from the album, including "Revolution Song", as its B-side the following year. The third single to be released was "Riverman" in May 2015, containing the new song "Leave My Guitar Alone". The fourth single to be released is "Lock All the Doors" and was available on 7" vinyl from 28 August 2015 and was backed with brand new song "Here's a Candle (for Your Birthday Cake)". Finally, the fifth single to be released from the album was "The Dying Of The Light", only available in certain regions on 7" vinyl from 11 December 2015 and contained a demo version of the song; "The Girl With X-Ray Eyes", previously featured on the album itself.

The first concert tour in promotion of Chasing Yesterday was detailed during the initial announcement of the album in October 2014, with six shows confirmed in the UK and Ireland between 3 and 10 March 2015, all of which sold out in minutes. The shows saw Gallagher and the band accompanied by a choir and a horn section, and featured setlists including songs from former band Oasis, and both High Flying Birds albums. A North American tour was also scheduled for May and June 2015.

== Title ==
The title of Chasing Yesterday was revealed during the album's official announcement on 13 October 2014. Speaking during the announcement, Gallagher claimed that he "literally came up with it [a week earlier]", adding that "if [he] could change it [he] would change it".

The title "Chasing Yesterday" appears in the lyrics to the track "While the Song Remains the Same".

== Composition ==
Speaking about Chasing Yesterday in January 2015, Gallagher revealed that opening track "Riverman" is his favourite track on the album, and one of the favourite tracks he has written. He also spoke about "The Right Stuff", comparing the style of the song to that of Queens of the Stone Age, the Rolling Stones and T. Rex.

Gallagher told NME, "On the original running order 'The Mexican' wasn't on the album, but I felt it needed something there to lighten the mood a bit."

== Critical reception ==
Professional ratings
Aggregate scores
Source	Rating
Metacritic	68/100
Review scores
Source	Rating
AllMusic	4/5 stars
American Songwriter	4/5 stars
The Daily Telegraph	3/5 stars
Digital Spy	3/5 stars
Exclaim!	7/10 stars
Mojo	4/5 stars
NME	7/10 stars
Pitchfork	5.9/10
Q	4/5 stars
Rolling Stone	3.5/5 stars

Chasing Yesterday received positive reviews from music critics. On Metacritic, which assigns a normalised rating out of 100 to reviews from mainstream critics, the album received an average score of 68 based on 26 reviews, indicating "generally favorable reviews".

David Fricke of Rolling Stone gave a positive review: "The greater appeal of Chasing Yesterday is in the way Gallagher, 47, now does reflection, loss and persistent optimism, leavening his usual power chords and pub-choir-ready choruses with a dusky, psychedelic churn that exposes the long, hidden thread running from early-Seventies Traffic to the Stone Roses." Mojo gave the album a 4/5 rating, writing, "While it may appear to arrive under a typically vague or clanging banner in the tradition of Dig Out Your Soul or Standing on the Shoulder of Giants, Chasing Yesterday is the most fittingly titled album to bear Noel Gallagher's name. The 47-year-old is in reflective lyrical mode, revealing his view from middle age, trying to find peace with the past, or (textbook mid-life crisis material) searching for a spectral, unattainable female."

NME awarded the album a score of 7/10 and commended Gallagher for blending his typical style with new influences "what do we expect from Noel Gallagher? Too much, probably, like all the other '90s Britrock titans who've never been adequately replaced. Chasing Yesterday has its flaws, but they're far outnumbered by moments where it succeeds in catching up with its titular quarry. The past will never be a foreign country to Noel Gallagher, but from this vantage point, tomorrow is looking pretty rosy." Helen Brown, writing for The Telegraph, gave Chasing Yesterday a score of 3/5, concluding, "The USP of this record is its warmer, looser atmosphere. Songs begin with little studio scuffles, exhalations and murmurs. Then, in the middle there's an unexpectedly trippy little chill out number called 'The Right Stuff' with a bassline that oozes with the retro-gloop of a lava lamp. Nice for Gallagher to stop chasing after yesterday for a while and just enjoy remembering it."

Chasing Yesterday won 'Best Album' at the 2015 Q Awards.

== Track listing ==
All tracks are written by Noel Gallagher.

No.	Title	Length
1.	"Riverman"	5:41
2.	"In the Heat of the Moment"	3:29
3.	"The Girl with X-Ray Eyes"	3:20
4.	"Lock All the Doors"	3:41
5.	"The Dying of the Light"	5:11
6.	"The Right Stuff"	5:27
7.	"While the Song Remains the Same"	4:16
8.	"The Mexican"	3:46
9.	"You Know We Can't Go Back"	3:46
10.	"Ballad of the Mighty I"	5:15
Total length:		43:52

Japanese edition bonus track
No.	Title	Length
11.	"Leave My Guitar Alone"	3:09
Total length:		47:01

Deluxe edition bonus tracks
No.	Title	Length
11.	"Do the Damage"	3:10
12.	"Revolution Song"	3:32
13.	"Freaky Teeth"	3:54
14.	"In the Heat of the Moment" (Toy Drum Remix)	5:58
Total length:		60:26

Japanese deluxe edition bonus tracks
No.	Title	Length
11.	"Do the Damage"	3:10
12.	"Revolution Song"	3:32
13.	"Freaky Teeth"	3:54
14.	"In the Heat of the Moment" (Toy Drum Remix)	5:58
15.	"Leave My Guitar Alone"	3:09
Total length:		63:35

== Personnel ==
Noel Gallagher's High Flying Birds

- Noel Gallagher – vocals, electric guitars, acoustic guitars, bass, Mellotron, piano, keyboards, percussion, electric washboard, production, artwork concept
- Paul Stacey – electric guitars, bass, Mellotron, keyboards, recording
- Jeremy Stacey – drums
- Mike Rowe – keyboards

Production personnel

- Amorphous Androgynous – production (tracks 6 and 8)
- Matt Howe – strings recording
- Craig Silvey – mixing
- Greg Calbi – mastering

Additional musicians

- Jim Hunt – saxophone and bass clarinet (tracks 1 and 6)
- Beccy Byrne – backing vocals (tracks 1, 3, 5 and 7)
- Vula Malinga – backing vocals (tracks 2 and 8)
- Joy Rose – backing vocals (track 6)
- Garry Cobain – backing vocals (track 8)
- Johnny Marr – electric guitar (track 10)
- Rosie Danvers – string arrangements
- The Wired Strings – strings (track 10)

Artwork personnel

- Matthew Cooper – layout design
- Lawrence Watson – photography
- Jen Stacey – photography

== Charts ==
=== Weekly charts ===
Chart (2015)	Peak position
Australian Albums (ARIA)	8
Austrian Albums (Ö3 Austria)	8
Belgian Albums (Ultratop Flanders)	7
Belgian Albums (Ultratop Wallonia)	18
Canadian Albums (Billboard)	12
Danish Albums (Hitlisten)	34
Dutch Albums (Album Top 100)	8
Finnish Albums (Suomen virallinen lista)	35
German Albums (Offizielle Top 100)	5
Hungarian Albums (MAHASZ)	9
Irish Albums (IRMA)	1
Irish Independent Albums (IRMA)	1
Italian Albums Chart	5
Japanese Albums Chart	10
New Zealand Albums (RMNZ)	12
Norwegian Albums (VG-lista)	22
Scottish Albums (OCC)	1
South Korean Albums (Circle)	12
Swedish Albums (Sverigetopplistan)	49
Swiss Albums (Schweizer Hitparade)	4
UK Albums (OCC)	1
UK Independent Albums (OCC)	1
UK Album Downloads (OCC)	1
UK Albums Physical (OCC)	1
UK Albums Streaming (OCC)	4
UK Vinyl Albums (OCC)	4
US Billboard 200	35
US Digital Albums (Billboard)	18
US Independent Albums (Billboard)	4
US Top Rock Albums (Billboard)	8

=== Year-end charts ===
Chart (2015)	Position
Belgian Albums (Ultratop Flanders)	58
Belgian Albums (Ultratop Wallonia)	177
UK Albums (OCC)	21

== Certifications ==
Region	Certification	Certified units/sales
United Kingdom (BPI)	Platinum	340,742

== Release history ==
Country	Date	Version(s)	Format(s)	Label(s)	Ref.
Japan	25 February 2015	Standard	CD, digital download	Sour Mash	
Japan	25 February 2015	Deluxe	CD, digital download	Sour Mash	
Germany	27 February 2015	Standard	LP	Sour Mash	
Germany	27 February 2015	Deluxe	CD, digital download	Sour Mash	
Ireland	27 February 2015	Standard	CD, LP, digital download	Sour Mash	
Ireland	27 February 2015	Deluxe	CD, digital download	Sour Mash	
Netherlands	27 February 2015	Standard	Digital download	Sour Mash	
Netherlands	27 February 2015	Deluxe	Digital download	Sour Mash	
Switzerland	27 February 2015	Deluxe	Digital download	Sour Mash	
United Kingdom	2 March 2015	Standard	LP, digital download	Sour Mash	
United Kingdom	2 March 2015	Deluxe	CD, digital download	Sour Mash	
France	2 March 2015	Standard	LP	Sour Mash	
France	2 March 2015	Deluxe	CD, digital download	Sour Mash	
Italy	2 March 2015	Standard	Digital download	Sour Mash	
Sweden	2 March 2015	Standard	Digital download	Sour Mash	
Sweden	2 March 2015	Deluxe	Digital download	Sour Mash	
Canada	3 March 2015	Standard	LP, digital download	Sour Mash	
Canada	3 March 2015	Deluxe	CD, digital download	Sour Mash	
United States	3 March 2015	Standard	CD, LP, digital download	Sour Mash	
United States	3 March 2015	Deluxe	Digital download	Sour Mash	
Australia	6 March 2015	Deluxe	Digital download	Sour Mash	
New Zealand	6 March 2015	Deluxe	Digital download	Sour Mash	
