= Noel Gallagher's High Flying Birds =

British alternative rock band

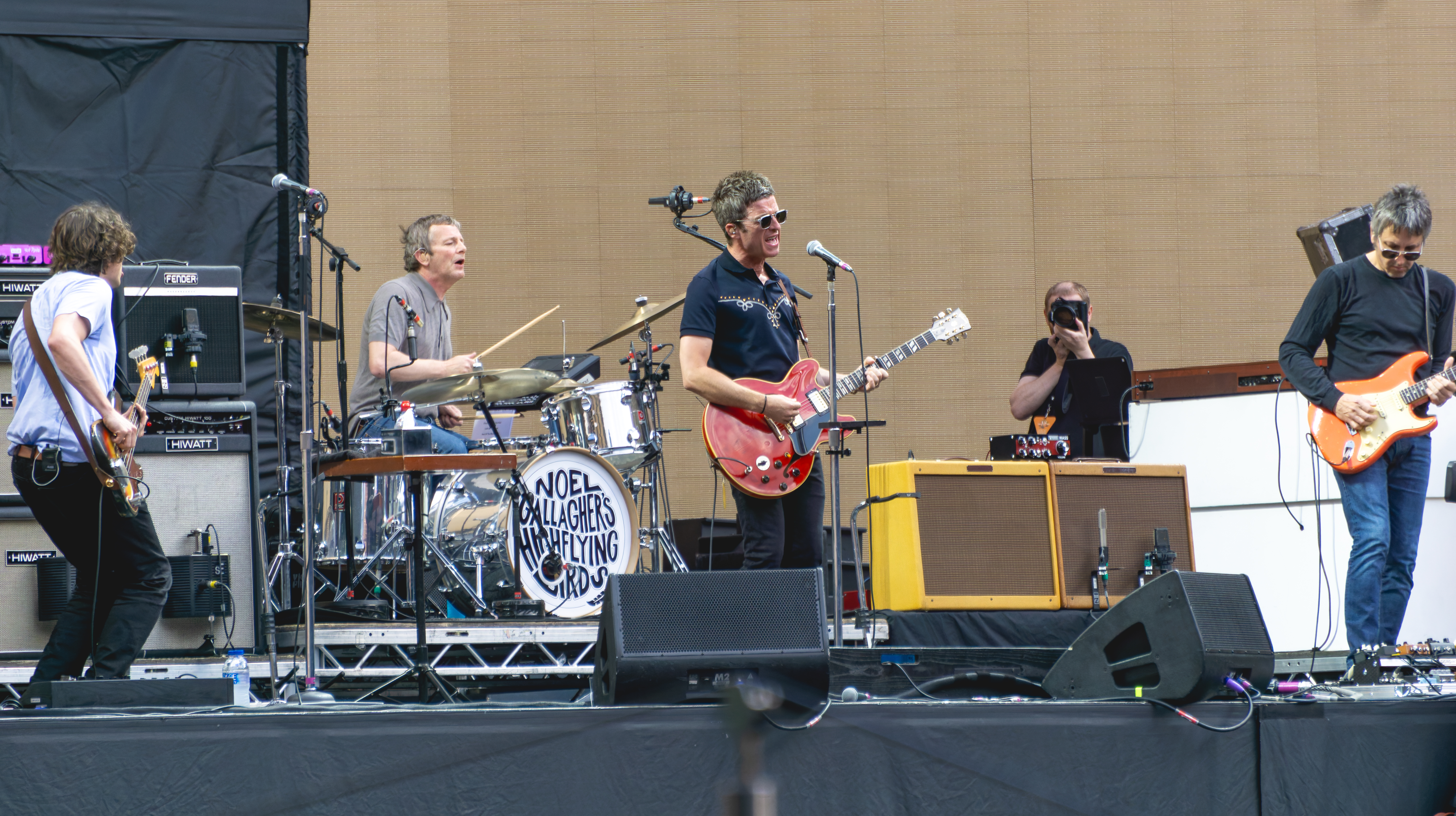
- High Flying Birds performing in July 2017

Background information
- Origin: Manchester, England
- Genres: Rock; alternative rock; psychedelic rock
- Years active: 2010–present
- Label: Sour Mash
- Spinoff of: Oasis
- Members: Noel Gallagher; Mike Rowe; Russell Pritchard; Chris Sharrock; Gem Archer; Jessica Greenfield
- Past members: Jeremy Stacey; Tim Smith
- Website: noelgallagher.com

Noel Gallagher's High Flying Birds are an English rock band formed in 2010 as the solo moniker of Oasis songwriter, guitarist, and vocalist Noel Gallagher. The touring band consisted of former Oasis members Gem Archer (guitar), Mike Rowe (piano), and Chris Sharrock (drums), as well as former Zutons bassist Russell Pritchard. The band has also had a variety of guests contribute to albums such as the Crouch End Festival Chorus, Amorphous Androgynous, Johnny Marr, and Paul Weller.

Since his departure from Oasis in August 2009, many speculated that Gallagher might record a solo album. In July 2011, he held a press conference to confirm this, after denying rumours from his brother Liam had already heard the tracks featured on it. Later that year, Noel released the project's self-titled debut album. Several singles from the album were released, including "The Death of You and Me", "If I Had a Gun...", "AKA... What a Life!", "Dream On", and "Everybody's on the Run". In 2015, High Flying Birds released their second album, Chasing Yesterday. Their third, Who Built the Moon?, was released in November 2017, which was followed by 3 EPs released between 2019 and 2020. Their fourth studio album, Council Skies, was released in June 2023.

Gallagher stated in an interview on The Jonathan Ross Show that the inspiration for the band's name was from two sources: the idea to prefix the name with "Noel Gallagher's" was formed while he was listening to the album Peter Green's Fleetwood Mac, while the latter part of the name is taken from the song "High Flying Bird", most notably recorded by Jefferson Airplane.

== History ==
=== Break-up of Oasis (2009–2010) ===
On 12 July 2009, rumours began to spread that Noel Gallagher intended to go solo, but these appear to have had no foundation. Two months later, a fight between the Gallagher brothers took place in a backstage area, reportedly resulting in Noel's guitar being smashed by Liam, and Noel subsequently storming off. On 28 August 2009 Oasis' manager announced the cancellation of their concert at the Rock en Seine festival near Paris just minutes before it was about to begin, along with the cancellation of the European tour and a statement that Oasis "does not exist anymore". Two hours later, a statement from Noel appeared on the band's website writing that "with some sadness and great relief...I quit Oasis tonight. People will write and say what they like, but I simply could not go on working with Liam a day longer."

=== High Flying Birds and scrapped Amorphous Androgynous album project (2011–2012) ===
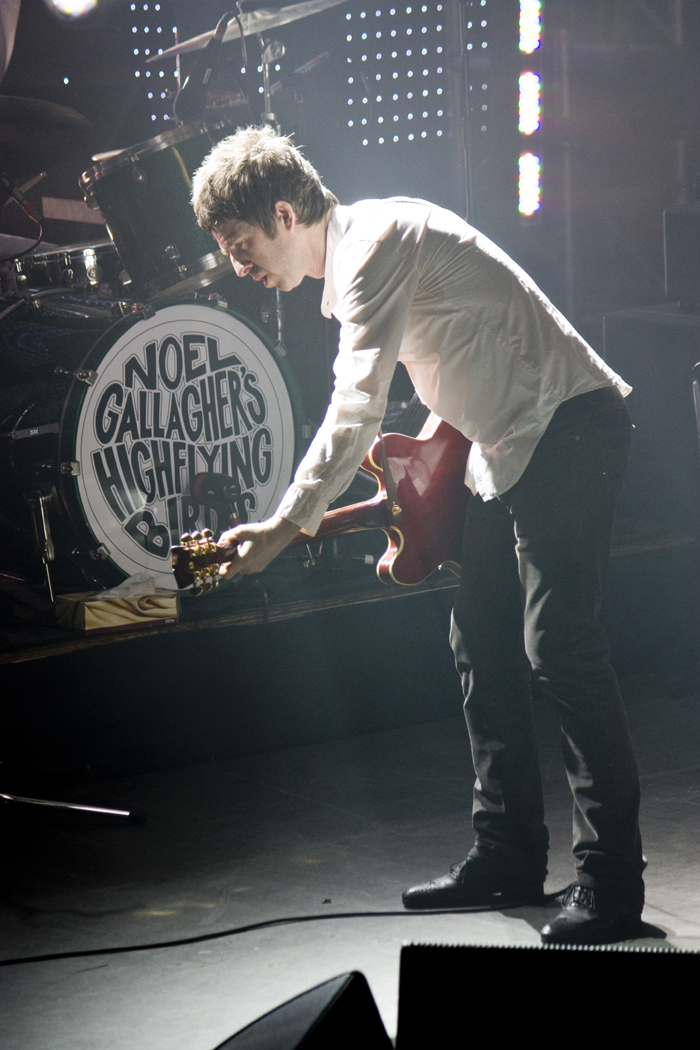
Gallagher in 2012

Gallagher's solo career plans began in earnest after Oasis disbanded. On 6 July 2011 Gallagher held a press conference in London during which he announced that Noel Gallagher's High Flying Birds would release a self-titled album on 17 October 2011, and a second collaboration with Amorphous Androgynous would be released in 2012. In August 2011, he released his debut single "The Death of You and Me", to positive reviews. Following the success of "The Death of You and Me", Gallagher confirmed on his website that the band's next UK single would be "AKA... What a Life!" which was released on 11 September 2011. "If I Had a Gun...", Gallagher's first US single, was made available on iTunes on 20 September 2011. Gallagher's second album was to be a collaboration with Amorphous Androgynous, due in late 2012. He said, "It sounds a bit like Pink Floyd's Dark Side of the Moon. The sound is similar to High Flying Birds, but more psychedelic and tripped out. It's not an electronic project. People are jumping to that conclusion because Amorphous Androgynous used to be an electronic outfit."

In the press conference, explaining solo album material and collaboration talk, Gallagher admitted the collaboration is "fucking far out. It's got like 18 tracks on it, some of it's krautrock, some of it's soul, some of it's funk and that's just the first song." Then later confessing, that he was nervous about releasing his second solo album with Amorphous Androgynous. "A lot of people are looking forward to it, which I'm a bit nervous about. They're building it up in their own minds, thinking it's going to be something it might not be when they hear it." He later found it hard to say "no comment" to journalists, adding, "I'm just cursed with an absolute endless stream of one-liners. I'm sorry about that. People say it's the way I talk in interviews that makes people interested. But they just mean I'm honest. 'Oh, he's got a way with honesty, that lad…' How depressing is that?" On 16 March 2012, Gallagher announced that an EP titled Songs from the Great White North would be released exclusively for Record Shop Day on 21 April 2012. The EP is made up of B-sides and includes a collaboration with Amorphous Androgynous, "Shoot a Hole into the Sun".

For the High Flying Birds touring band, Gallagher recruited keyboardist Mike Rowe and drummer Jeremy Stacey, both of whom continued their roles from the album sessions. Former the Zutons bassist Russell Pritchard, upon hearing that Gallagher had recorded an album and was putting together a band, got in touch and offered his services. David McConnell of the Sand Band was originally chosen for the lead guitarist role but dropped out four weeks before the band's first show; American musician Tim Smith, whom Rowe and Stacey had known from their time together as part of Sheryl Crow's backing band, was hired as the new guitarist.

Noel Gallagher's High Flying Birds sold 55,000 copies after two days of sale, more than twice as many copies as its nearest rival, Letters by The X Factor winner Matt Cardle. On 23 October 2011, the album debuted at number one on the UK Albums Chart, with first-week sales of 122,530 copies. In comparison, the debut album by the band of Noel's brother Liam Gallagher, Beady Eye's Different Gear, Still Speeding, sold 66,817 copies when it debuted at number three on the chart in March 2011 and has since sold 166,609 copies in the UK as of January 2012. On 11 November 2011, Noel Gallagher's High Flying Birds was certified platinum by the British Phonographic Industry (BPI) for shipments of 300,000 units in the UK. As of February 2012 the album has sold 600,000 copies in the UK. The album was the fourteenth best-selling album in the UK in 2011. It was also the second biggest-selling rock album of 2011 in the UK, behind Coldplay's Mylo Xyloto. As of 2 January 2013 the album has sold 739,000 copies in the UK. As February 2015 the album has sold 2.5 million copies worldwide.

=== Chasing Yesterday (2013–2016) ===
On 15 August 2013, Noel Gallagher appeared on the TalkSPORT show "The Sports Bar", presented by Andy Goldstein and Jason Cundy, to discuss Manchester City and other sports topics. When confronted with questions from fans on Twitter and through Email, Andy Goldstein read through speculations of rumours of an Oasis reunion for Gallagher while on the show. Once again, Gallagher swatted away any possible Oasis reunion for 2014, and then was asked if he was working on any new 'High Flying Birds' material. Gallagher confirmed on the talk show:

I've got tons of songs leftover from the last one. What am I doing at the moment? I'm writing, putting stuff together. I'll definitely make another one, [a new album], that's for sure! I don't want to go back out on the road though, that's the thing. Guarding any more of detail of a new second solo album, Gallagher was then asked for a release date of new material, and with hesitation, he said: "It'll probably come out when it's finished, I don't know."

Gallagher said on 20 October 2013 that his most recent songs that were written solely for the new album were his 'best songs ever' written. "I finished it and I played it (the new songs), I think 'That's pretty good! In fact, it might be the best song I've ever written!' — Until I heard 'Rock and Roll Star' on the radio, and go, 'Yeah… it's not that good!'." On 17 February 2014, Rosie Danvers and the Wired Strings collaborated with Noel Gallagher for his second solo album, recording strings for one track. The session occurred at Abbey Road Studios in London, according to the Wired Strings website. On 29 May 2014, Gallagher posted a photo on his official Facebook page confirming he has started work on his second album and follow-up. The photo shows him tuning one of his many electric guitars. On 17 June 2014, his wife, Sara MacDonald, indicated on Instagram that Gallagher was in the middle of recording his new album. She posted a message to fans confirming that Gallagher would not be making his usual trip to the World Cup, "Brace yourselves people.......he's not going. At all. He is too busy".

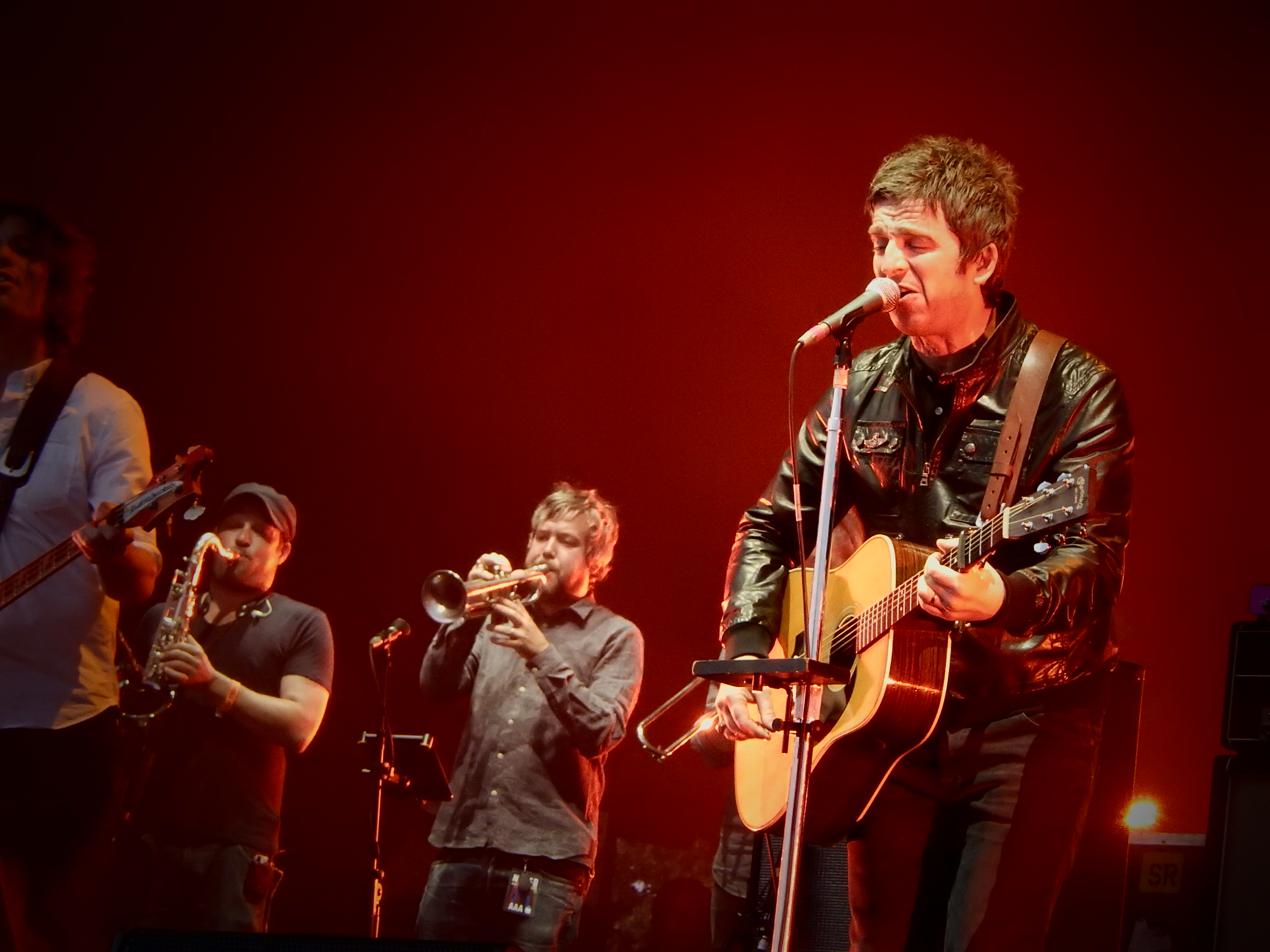
High Flying Birds in 2015

On 13 October 2014, it was announced that a new album titled Chasing Yesterday would be released on 2 March 2015. The first single from the album, "In the Heat of the Moment", was released on 17 November 2014 followed by "Ballad of the Mighty I" and "Riverman". A UK, European and North American tour followed as well as many festival appearances. Rolling Stone gave a positive review stating, "The greater appeal of Chasing Yesterday is in the way Gallagher, 47, now does reflection, loss and persistent optimism, leavening his usual power chords and pub-choir-ready choruses with a dusky, psychedelic churn that exposes the long, hidden thread running from early-Seventies Traffic to the Stone Roses." Mojo gave the album a 4/5 rating writing that, "While it may appear to arrive under a typically vague or clanging banner in the tradition of Dig Out Your Soul or Standing on the Shoulder of Giants, Chasing Yesterday is the most fittingly titled album to bear Noel Gallagher's name. The 47-year-old is in reflective lyrical mode, revealing his view from middle age, trying to find peace with the past, or (textbook mid-life crisis material) searching for a spectral, unattainable female.".

On 4 July 2015 they headlined at Calling Festival in Clapham Common. After performing their first song, "Everybody's on the Run", Noel spoke to the crowd saying; "Hello Clapham... Now there's something I never thought I'd say." The Chasing Yesterday Tour continued into 2016, though on 7 March – a day before the tour resumed in Guadalajara, Mexico – it was announced that drummer Jeremy Stacey would be departed from touring band and joining King Crimson. After this leg of the tour took the band to South America, Australia and Europe, Stacey's final show was on 30 April in his hometown of Bournemouth. For the remainder of the tour, Gallagher reunited with former Oasis touring drummer Chris Sharrock, whose first show was in Atlanta on 1 July. Sharrock was actually one of only two drummers in England, along with Stacey, that Gallagher originally considered during High Flying Birds' inception. However, since Sharrock had already joined Beady Eye, Liam Gallagher's new band with the other former members of Oasis, that left Stacey as the only choice by default. Though Stacey had left the touring band, he would still be the primary drummer for the recording sessions of High Flying Birds' third album, Who Built the Moon? The tour concluded that September with a one-off show at the Brixton Academy (the first time Noel had ever headlined the venue with either his High Flying Birds or Oasis). During this show, Noel was joined on stage by special guests Johnny Marr and Paul Weller.

=== Who Built the Moon? and EPs (2017–2020) ===
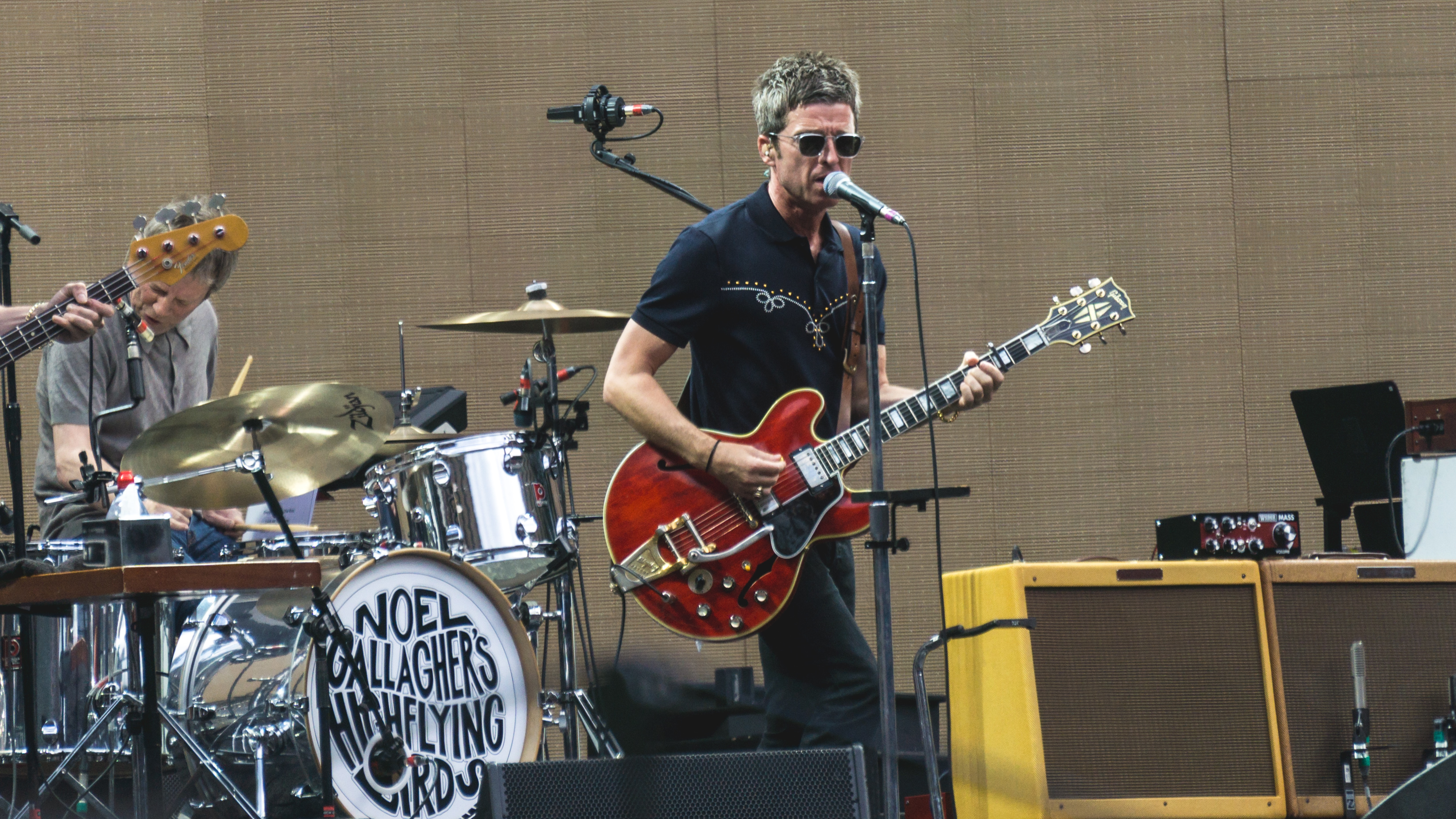
High Flying Birds in 2017

Gallagher announced he had begun working on a third solo album on 6 October 2016, when he posted a picture on Instagram of himself in a studio with the caption, "New shoes. New amp. New album. There is no rest for the wicked ones." On 24 June 2017, Gallagher introduced a special screening of the Oasis documentary Supersonic. On 6 July 2017, Gallagher posted a photo from rehearsals for their upcoming European dates in support of U2, noting that they had new members. The members in question were Sharrock, former Oasis and Beady Eye drummer, who had retained his position as drummer after the most recent High Flying Birds tour in mid-2016, along with former Oasis and Beady Eye guitarist Gem Archer. This marked Gallagher and Archer's reunion as bandmates, though the latter had previously sat in on several of Gallagher's solo acoustic shows since Oasis' split. On 9 September 2017, the band served as the headline act of "We Are Manchester", a benefit concert to mark the reopening of Manchester Arena, following a terrorist attack there in May. On 25 September 2017, Noel Gallagher's High Flying Birds announced that their third studio album, titled Who Built the Moon? would be released on 24 November 2017. Who Built the Moon? debuted at number one on the UK Albums Chart with 78,000 album-equivalent units, making it Gallagher's 10th number one studio album as part of both Oasis and Noel Gallagher's High Flying Birds. In July, the album was nominated for the 2018 Mercury Prize, Gallagher's first placing on the award's shortlist since Oasis' (What's the Story) Morning Glory? in 1995.

The Guardian wrote that "The third record from Noel Gallagher's solo outfit is, according to the ex-Oasis man, merely him in 'more colourful clothes'. Brightness is certainly the first thing that strikes you about Who Built the Moon, an album that cloaks Gallagher's hardy guitar-pop in glowing Smithsian riffs, tin whistle samples from novelty 60s tunes and a heady fug of riotous glam rock. Particular highlights include the gloriously Slade-esque 'Holy Mountain' and the singalong-friendly 'Black and White Sunshine,' which resembles Oasis basking on a sun lounger. Even the fact that the album regularly recalls some of the duller post-Britpop bands – 'It's a Beautiful World' is basically an Elbow track backed by a breakbeat – can't dampen the joy that rings out from every corner. Producer David Holmes may be responsible for Noel's change of pace, but the vibrancy and strains of psychedelia never feel like intruders: instead, they act as the perfect foil for the record's blissed-out lyrics about life-changing love."

Prior to a performance on Later... with Jools Holland, the band added Jessica Greenfield on backing vocals and keyboards to the line-up. In February 2018, the band commenced their Stranded on the Earth World Tour in North America before moving onto Europe and the United Kingdom throughout April and May 2018. On 2 May 2019, Noel Gallagher's High Flying Birds released "Black Star Dancing", the title track of their EP of the same name, which was released on 14 June 2019. A second EP titled This Is The Place was released on 27 September 2019 and a third EP, Blue Moon Rising, was released on 6 March 2020. The band began a tour of North America with The Smashing Pumpkins in August 2019, followed by an Australian tour in support of U2 in November.

=== Back the Way We Came: Vol. 1 and Council Skies (2021–present) ===
On 29 April 2021, Gallagher announced the release of the band's first greatest hits album, titled Back the Way We Came: Vol. 1 (2011–2021). The album is a double release, which along with 16 previously released tracks, features two new songs; "We're on Our Way Now" and "Flying on the Ground", the former of which was released as a single the same day as its announcement. It was released on 11 June 2021 and debuted at no.1 on the UK charts, becoming Gallagher's 12th chart topping album.

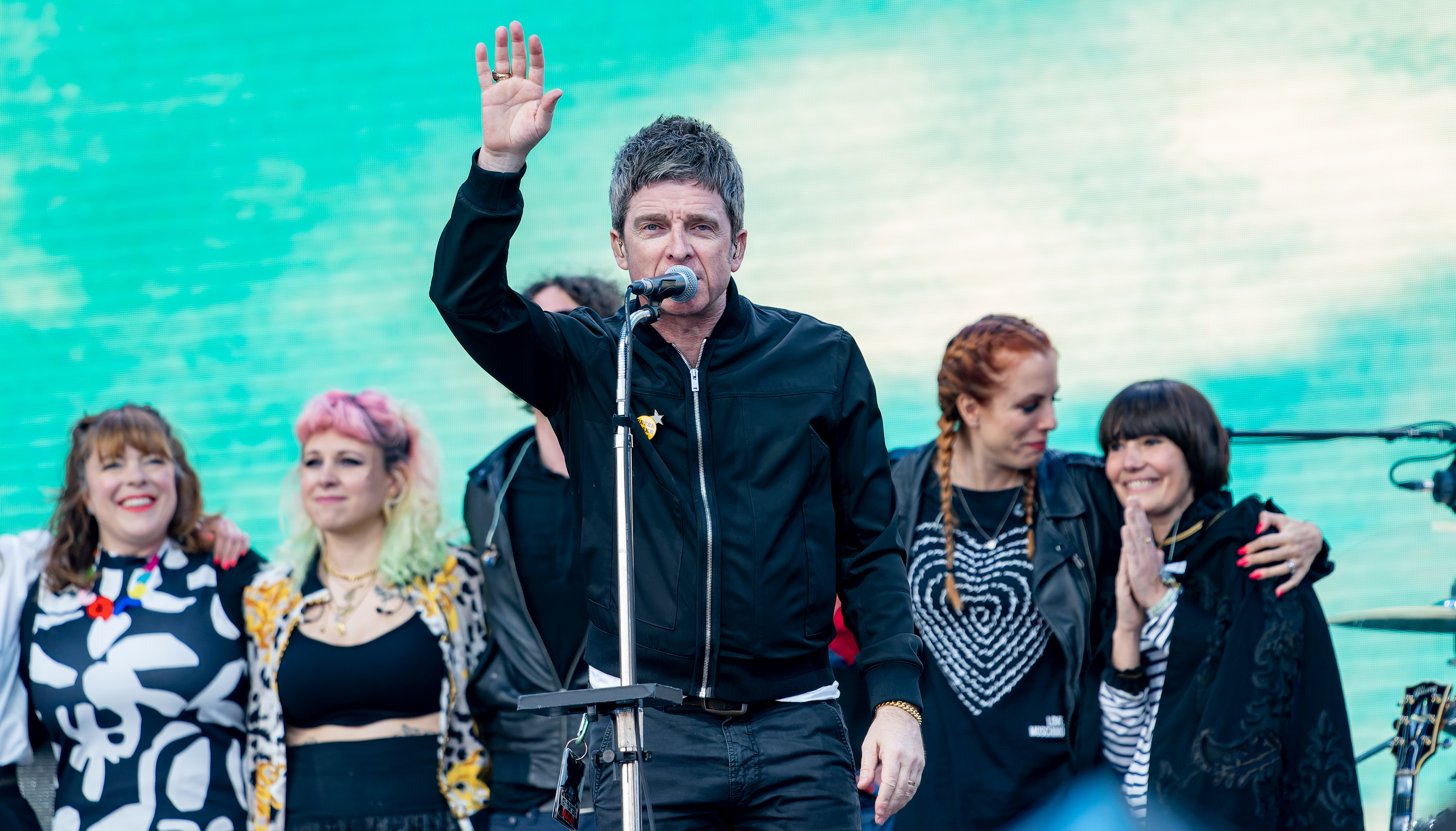
High Flying Birds following a performance at Glastonbury in 2022

Following the release of the compilation, Gallagher began work on the next High Flying Birds album, releasing two demos of songs to come to celebrate each new year during the heights of the pandemic. The songs were "We're Gonna Get There in the End" (31 December 2020) and "Trying to Find a World That's Been and Gone, Part One" (1 January 2022). "Pretty Boy", the first official single from the group's fourth album featuring additional guitars by Johnny Marr, was released on 31 October 2022. On 17 January 2023, "Easy Now" was released as the album's second single, along with its title of Council Skies and its release date, 2 June 2023. In February 2023, the band announced their Summer 2023 co-headline North American tour with Garbage featuring Metric as special guests. On 21 September 2023, the concert film Live at Wythenshawe Park, Manchester was released.

== Band members ==
=== Current members ===
- Noel Gallagher – lead vocals, guitar, piano, bass (2010–present)
- Mike Rowe – keyboards (2010–present)
- Russell Pritchard – bass, backing vocals (2010–present)
- Chris Sharrock – drums, percussion (2016–present)
- Gem Archer – guitar, harmonica (2016–present)
- Jessica Greenfield – backing vocals, keyboards, tambourine (2017–present)

=== Former members ===
- Jeremy Stacey – drums, percussion (2010–2016)
- Tim Smith – guitar, backing vocals (2010–2016)
- YSEÉ – backing vocals (2017–2022)
- Charlotte Marionneau – percussion, backing vocals (2017–2022)

== Discography ==
- Noel Gallagher's High Flying Birds (2011)
- Chasing Yesterday (2015)
- Who Built the Moon? (2017)
- Council Skies (2023)

== Filmography ==
Concert films

- Live at Wythenshawe Park, Manchester (2023) – The band's headline performance at Wythenshawe Park in Manchester on 26 August 2023 was recorded and released as a live concert stream through On Air. The 19-song show, featuring Dolby Vision and Dolby Atmos sound, was made available for pay-per-view on 21 September 2023.
