= The Future Sound of London discography =

This is the discography page for ambient electronic group the Future Sound of London. All works released as the Future Sound of London unless otherwise noted.

== Albums ==
=== As the Future Sound of London ===
Year	Album details	Peak chart positions		Certifications (sales thresholds)
Year	Album details	UK	UK Dance Album Chart	Certifications (sales thresholds)
1992	Accelerator	75	26	
1992	Earthbeat	-	-	
1994	Lifeforms	6	1	UK: Gold
1995	ISDN	44	-	
1996	Dead Cities	26	2	
2006	Teachings from the Electronic Brain	-	-	
2007	From the Archives Vol. 1	-	-	
2007	From the Archives Vol. 2	-	-	
2007	From the Archives Vol. 3	-	-	
2007	Environments	-	-	
2008	From the Archives Vol. 4	-		
2008	From the Archives Vol. 5	-	-	
2008	Environments II	-	-	
2010	Environments 3	-	-	
2010	From the Archives Vol. 6	-	-	
2012	Environments 4	-	-	
2012	From the Archives Vol. 7	-	-	
2014	Environment Five	-	-	
2015	Archived 8	-	-	
2015	Life In Moments	-	24	
2016	Environment Six	-	-	
2016	Environment 6.5	-	-	
2017	2017 Calendar Album	-	-	
2017	Archived : Environmental : Views	-	-	
2018	2018 Calendar Album	-	-	
2018	From the Archives Vol. 9	-	-	
2019	FSOL Calendar Album 2019	-	-	
2019	Yage 2019	-	-	
2020	FSOL Calendar Album 2020	-	-	
2020	A Controlled Vista	-	-	
2020	Cascade 2020	-	-	
2021	FSOL Calendar Album 2021	-	-	
2021	Music for 3 Books	-	-	
2021	Music from Calendars 2017-2020	-	-	
2021	We Have Explosive 2021	-	-	
2021	Mind Maps	-	-	
2021	Mind Maps 2	-	-	
2022	Calendar Album 2022	-	-	
2022	Rituals >e7.001	-	33	
2023	Calendar Album 2023	-	-	
2023	A Space of Partial Illumination E7.002	-	-	
2023	Environments E7.003	-	-	

=== As Humanoid ===
- (1989) Global
- (2003) Sessions 84-88
- (2007) Your Body Sub Atomic
- (2019) Built by Humanoid
- (2021) 7 Songs
- (2022) sT8818r

=== As Amorphous Androgynous ===
Year	Album details	Peak chart positions			Certifications (sales thresholds)
Year	Album details	UK	UK Sales	UK Dance	Certifications (sales thresholds)
1993	Tales of Ephidrina	-	100	-	
2002	The Isness	68	-	-	
2003	The Otherness	-	-	-	
2005	Alice In Ultraland	-	-	32	
2008	The Peppermint Tree & the Seeds of Superconsciousness	-	-	-	
2008	A Monstrous Psychedelic Bubble Exploding in Your Mind: Volume 1	-	-	-	
2009	A Monstrous Psychedelic Bubble Exploding in Your Mind: Volume 2	-	-	-	
2010	A Monstrous Psychedelic Bubble Exploding in Your Mind: Volume 3	-	-	-	
2013	The Cartel Vol. 1	-	-	-	
2013	The Cartel Vol. 2	-	-	-	
2015	A Monstrous Psychedelic Bubble Exploding in Your Mind: The Wizards of Oz	-	-	-	
2020	We Persuade Ourselves We Are Immortal (with Peter Hammill)	-	-	-	

=== As Zeebox ===
- (2007) Zeebox 1984-1987 Vol. 1
- (2007) Zeebox 1984-1987 Vol. 2
- (2009) Zeebox 1984-1987 Vol. 3

=== Other stage names ===
- (2003) Eurotechno (as Stakker)
- (2007) Hand-Made Devices (as Polemical)
- (2007) 4 Forests (as Part-Sub-Merged)
- (2007) The San Monta Tapes (as Heads of Agreement)
- (2008) The Woodlands of Old (as Yage)
- (2016) Blackhill Transmitter (as Blackhill Transmitter)
- (2016) Ignition of the Sun (as Synthi A)

== Singles and EPs ==
=== As The Future Sound of London ===
Year	Single details	Peak chart positions	Certifications (sales thresholds)
Year	Single details	UK	Certifications (sales thresholds)
1991	Pulse EP	-	-
1991	Pulse Two EP	-	-
1992	Papua New Guinea	22	-
1993	Cascade	27	-
1994	Expander	72	-
1994	Lifeforms (feat. Elizabeth Fraser)	14	-
1995	The Far-Out Son of Lung and the Ramblings of a Madman	22	-
1996	My Kingdom	13	-
1997	We Have Explosive	12	-
2001	Papua New Guinea 2001	28	-
2002	Papua New Guinea 2002	106	-
2007	Archived EP	-	-
2014	Artworks 1	-	-
2017	Ramblings Vol. 1	-	-
2018	Ramblings Vol. 2	-	-
2019	Ramblings Vol. 3	-	-
2020	A Controlled Vista 2.7 (MiniPack 1)	-	-
2020	A Controlled Vista 5.6 (MiniPack 2)	-	-
2024	Captures (pre8ep 001)	-	-

=== As Humanoid ===
Year	Single details	Peak chart positions	Certifications (sales thresholds)
Year	Single details	UK	Certifications (sales thresholds)
1988	Stakker Humanoid	17	-
1989	Slam	54	-
1989	Tonight (feat. Sharon Benson)	-	-
1989	The Deep	-	-
1989	Crystals	-	-
1992	Stakker Humanoid '92	40	-
2001	Stakker Humanoid 2001	65	-
2007	Stakker Humanoid 2007	-	-
2018	30303 EP	-	-
2020	KAAGE EP	-	-
2020	Future: Turned EP	-	-
2020	Orfan Atmosphere EP	-	-
2021	sT8818r Humanoid	-	-

=== As Mental Cube ===
- (1990) Q (BZZXL 106033)
- (1991) So This Is Love
- (1991) Q (180 996)

=== As Amorphous Androgynous ===
Year	Single details	Peak chart positions	Certifications (sales thresholds)
Year	Single details	UK Physical Singles	Certifications (sales thresholds)
1993	Liquid Insects	-	-
2002	The Mello Hippo Disco Show	-	-
2003	Divinity	-	-
2005	The Witchfinder	-	-
2021	The World Is Full Of Plankton	38	-

=== Other stage names ===
- (1990) A.S.T. (as Art Science Technology)
- (1990) I Can See for Miles (as Yunie)
- (1991) You Took My Love (as Candese)
- (1991) The Tingler (as Smart Systems)
- (1991) The Pulse EP (as FSOL and Indo Tribe)
- (1991) Pulse 2 EP (as FSOL, Smart Systems and Indo Tribe)
- (1991) Principles of Motion EP (as Intelligent Communication)
- (1991) Pulse 3 EP (as Smart Systems, Indo Tribe and Yage)
- (1992) Fuzzy Logic EP (as Yage)
- (1992) Pulse Four EP (as Mental Cube, Smart Systems and Indo Tribe)
- (1992) People Livin' Today (as Semi-Real)
- (1992) Metropolis (as Metropolis)
- (2008) Tingler 2008 (as Smart Systems)
- (2009) Cloudscraper (as Six Oscillators in Remittance)
- (2013) EP (as Blackhill Transmitter)
- (2013) One (as EMS : Piano)
- (2013) Stillness (as Suburban Domestic)
- (2013) Salient Moons 1972 (as Sand Sound Folly)
- (2013) EP (as Blackhill Transmitter)
- (2014) 2nd (as Blackhill Transmitter)
- (2014) An Open Window (as The Jazz Mags)
- (2015) 3 (as Blackhill Transmitter)
- (2016) Four (as Blackhill Transmitter)
- (2019) MOA016 (as Humanoid / Yage)
- (2020) Pygmy EP (as Yage)

== Other ==
- (1997) ISDN Show (A promo recording of a live netcast)
- (2007) A Gigantic Globular Burst Of Anti-Static (Soundtrack for an art exhibition held at the Kinetica Art Museum, London in 2006)
- (2008) FSOL Digital Mix (A free mix CD with Greek music magazine "Freeze")
- (2012) The Fears and Fantasies of the Unconscious Mind (Sampler previewing tracks released on FSOLDigital)
- (2017) FSOL:Digitana – The SX-One Live Improvisations (Live improvisations promoting the SX-1 synth)

== Remix work ==
They have also garnered a reputation as remixers, transforming the work of a variety of different artists, including:

- (1991) Loleatta Holloway, "Do That To Me (Set Me Free)"
- (1992) Unity, "Unity"
- (1992) Inner City, "Praise"
- (1992) Nomad, "Your Love Is Lifting Me"
- (1992) Prefab Sprout, "If You Don't Love Me"
- (1992) Stereo MCs, "Connected"
- (1993) Curve, "Rising"
- (1993) Bryan Ferry, "I Put a Spell on You"
- (1993) The Shamen, "Re:iteration"
- (1993) David Sylvian & Robert Fripp, "Darshana"
- (1994) Apollo 440, "Liquid Cool"
- (1994) Massive Attack, "Sly"
- (1995) Jon Anderson, "Speed Deep"
- (1996) Osamu Sato, "Face-Savers On-line"
- (2001) Robert Miles, "Paths"
- (2002) Deadly Avenger, "Day One"
- (2009) Oasis, "Falling Down"
- (2009) Neotropic, "Home"
- (2010) Paul Weller, "Aim High/Pieces Of A Dream"
- (2010) Pop Levi, "Blue Honey"
- (2014) Blu Mar Ten, "Night Shift"

The results are often novel and complex, and in some instances the original track is barely recognisable.
