= Teachings from the Electronic Brain =

Compilation album by The Future Sound of London
- Released: 28 August 2006 (United Kingdom)
- Genres: Electronica, ambient, IDM
- Length: 64:44
- Label: Astralwerks
- Producers: Brian Dougans, Garry Cobain, Philip Pin

The Future Sound of London chronology
Alice in Ultraland (2005)	Teachings from the Electronic Brain (2006)	A Gigantic Globular Burst Of Anti-Static (2007)

Professional ratings
Review scores
Source	Rating
Allmusic	link
Remixmag	very favourable

Teachings from the Electronic Brain is a compilation of songs from throughout the career of British band The Future Sound of London, and was released in 2006. The diversity of their wide range of work is even more apparent on a compilation such as this.

== Album ==
The album also includes two songs they recorded under the name Amorphous Androgynous. Despite favourable reviews in the press, the album has been unpopular with fans, who have criticised its track list as being lazy, drawing largely from Dead Cities, and with tracks simply fading in and out rather than being properly mixed.

However, in an interview with Barcodezine (who found it favourable), Cobain says:

in our mind we tried to make it a nice balance of light and dark, feminine/masculine – all these qualities. There's quite a few different sides to FSOL, there is the very, very abstract, what we term the more male, machine music. We tried to not go too extreme into that but keep it melodic, experimental, involving, yes the hits, but in maybe edited or slightly remixed form – there's an edit of the Liz Fraser (Cocteau Twins) single on there. But actually, from our point of view, what we consider to be the most long-standing tracks, and try to get the balance right, which I think we’ve done quite well.

== Track listing ==
1. "Papua New Guinea" (12" version) – 4:59
2. "Max" – 2:55
3. "Everyone in the World Is Doing Something Without Me" – 2:00
4. "My Kingdom" – 5:39
5. "Smokin' Japanese Babe" – 5:14
6. "Antique Toy" – 4:15
7. "Lifeforms" (radio edit) – 4:39
8. "Yage" – 6:23
9. "Expander" (12" version) – 4:52
10. "Glass" – 4:55
11. "The Far-Out Son of Lung and the Ramblings of a Madman" – 4:15
12. "The Lovers" – 5:57
13. "Mountain Goat" – 4:41
14. "Cascade" (shortform) – 4:17
15. "We Have Explosive" (7" edit) – 3:10

== Crew ==
- Artwork by [design] – Andrew Day in The Red Room, EMI
- Compiled by – Future Sound Of London, The
- Engineer – Stone Freshwaters (tracks: 12), Yage
- Mastered by – Ian Jones (4)
- Other [directed by] – FSOL (tracks: 13)
- Other [project coordinator] – Libby Jones, Paula Flack
- Producer – Future Sound Of London, The (tracks: 1 to 12, 14, 15), Philip Pin (tracks: 13)
- Written by – Brian Dougans, Elizabeth Fraser (tracks: 7), Garry Cobain
- "Max" written by Max Richter
