= A Monstrous Psychedelic Bubble Exploding in Your Mind: Volume 1 =

Compilation album by Amorphous Androgynous
- Released: 24 Nov 2008 (CD, United Kingdom)
- Genre: Electronica; ambient; progressive rock; experimental
- Length: 151:07
- Label: FSOLdigital.com; Platipus Records; PLATCD190
- Producer: Garry Cobain; Brian Dougans

Amorphous Androgynous chronology
A Monstrous Psychedelic Bubble Exploding in Your Mind: Volume 1 (2008)	A Monstrous Psychedelic Bubble Exploding in Your Mind: Volume 2 (2009)

The Future Sound of London chronology
Environments II (2008)	A Monstrous Psychedelic Bubble Exploding in Your Mind: Volume 1 Cosmic Space Music (2008)	A Monstrous Psychedelic Bubble Exploding in Your Mind: Volume 2 Pagan Love Vibrations (2009)

Professional ratings
Review scores
Source	Rating
BBC Music	Very positive link
New-noise.net	Favourable link
NME	link
Uncut	link
Clash	link
DJ	link
Subba-Cultcha	link

A Monstrous Psychedelic Bubble Exploding in Your Mind: Volume 1 is a 2008 compilation album with selections by Amorphous Androgynous. It was released on CD in November 2008. It is an extensive compilation mix album featuring a wide variety of artists, selected and mixed by the duo. Cosmic Space Music is the first in the series, and focuses on the band's psychedelic side, featuring everything from 1960s pop to film scores and modern psychedelia.

The album generally received positive reviews. Time Out described it as "quite simply the best compilation ever". Noel Gallagher of the band Oasis got into contact with Gaz Cobain after hearing this record and asked him if the Amorphous Androgynous would remix the forthcoming Oasis single "Falling Down".

== Track listing ==
=== Disc 1 ===
1. Donovan – Barabajagal (Love Is Hot) – (3:18)
2. Chiitra Neogy – The Perfumed Garden – The Encouragement of the Lusty Wife – (0:14)
3. Heaven and Earth – Feel The Spirit – (4:26)
4. Osibisa – Black Ant – (3:15)
5. Pop Levi – Blue Honey – (3:27)
6. The Yellow Moon Band – Entangled – (2:20)
7. The Earlies – Breaking Point – (4:25)
8. Betty Davis – If I'm in Luck (I Might Get Picked Up) – (4:34)
9. Mountain Machine – Mountain Machine – (3:24)
10. Henry Roland – After All – (3:33)
11. Paul Giovanni – Maypole from The Wicker Man – (2:18)
12. Ian Neal – Kingdom of the Birds – (4:58)
13. The Amorphous Androgynous – Light Beyond Sound – (0:51)
14. Bob Downes – Tunnels Electronic – (1:02)
15. Can – Flow Motion – (3:55)
16. The Cosmic Wizards Club Band – Musashi – (1:32)
17. Espers – Mansfield And Cyclops – (5:45)
18. Cranium Pie – There It Is Part 2 – (0:42)
19. Miles Davis – Rated X – (5:10)
20. Psychonauts – Circles – (3:26)
21. Pentangle – Light Flight – (2:55)
22. Friends of Dean Martinez – Wichita Lineman – (4:52)
23. The Amorphous Androgynous – The Lovers – (4:41)
24. The Amorphous Androgynous – Opus of the Black Sun – (3:46)

=== Disc 2 ===
1. Tommy Graham – Sahajiya – (3:40)
2. Cranium Pie – Awakening of the Birds – (1:17)
3. Cranium Pie – Drying in the Sun – (2:05)
4. Nick Nicely – 49 Cigars – (2:49)
5. Chiitra Neogy – The Perfumed Garden – The Encouragement of the Lusty Wife – (0:50)
6. Donovan – Riki Tiki Tavi – (3:08)
7. Devendra Banhart – Lazy Butterfly – (4:04)
8. The Mahavishnu Orchestra – You Know, You Know – (5:01)
9. Hariprasad Chaurasia – Manzh Khamaz Teental – (2:07)
10. Tim Buckley – I Never Asked To Be Your Mountain – (5:34)
11. The Emperor Machine – Roller Daddy – (5:13)
12. Mahagon – Divka & Jablky – (3:03)
13. Lord Sitar – I Am The Walrus – (4:01)
14. Wizards of Ooze – Helga – (2:02)
15. Tommy James and the Shondells – Cellophane Symphony – (7:38)
16. Hawkwind – Silver Machine – (4:12)
17. Magic Carpet – The Phoenix – (3:38)
18. David Axelrod – The Mental Traveler – (3:43)
19. Werkraum – Queen Mab – (3:33)
20. Shweta Jhaveri – Heart of Darkness – (12:00)

== Crew ==
- Artwork – amorphik arts
- Mixed and compiled by Amorphous Androgynous
