= A Monstrous Psychedelic Bubble Exploding in Your Mind =

A Monstrous Psychedelic Bubble Exploding in Your Mind may refer to:

- A Monstrous Psychedelic Bubble Exploding in Your Mind: Volume 1, 2008 compilation album by Amorphous Androgynous
- A Monstrous Psychedelic Bubble Exploding in Your Mind: Volume 2, 2009 compilation album by Amorphous Androgynous
- A Monstrous Psychedelic Bubble Exploding in Your Mind: Volume 3, 2010 compilation album by Amorphous Androgynous
