= ISDN (disambiguation) =

ISDN may refer to:

- Integrated Services Digital Network (ISDN)
  - Broadband Integrated Services Digital Network (B-ISDN)
- ISDN (album) by The Future Sound of London
- Isosorbide dinitrate, the drug used in the treatment of angina pectoris
