= Expander (song) =

Single by Future Sound of London

from the album Accelerator
- Released: 4 July 1994
- Recorded: Earthbeat Studios
- Genre: Electronica; Techno
- Length: 17:18
- Label: Jumpin' & Pumpin' Records; CDS TOT 37
- Songwriter(s): Brian Dougans; Garry Cobain
- Producer(s): FSOL

Future Sound of London singles chronology
| "Lifeforms" (1994) | "Expander" (1994) | "The Far-Out Son of Lung and the Ramblings of a Madman" (1994) |

"Expander" is a 1994 song by British electronic music group The Future Sound of London, taken from their 1992 album, Accelerator. The single was released along with a remixed version and two other songs: "Moscow" and "Central Industrial". Accelerator was subsequently re-released in the US in 1996.

== Track listing ==
1. Expander (Radio Edit) (3:48)
2. Expander (Remix) (4:53)
3. Moscow (Remix) (4:55)
4. Central Industrial (4:22)

== Crew ==
- Written, performed & produced by FSOL
- Photography: FSOL Private Collection. Artwork design at Red Hot.

== Charts ==
| Chart (1994) | Peak positions |
|---|---|
| UK Singles (OCC) | 72 |
| UK Dance (OCC) | 19 |
| UK Dance (Music Week) | 19 |
