= Alice in Ultraland =

Studio album by Amorphous Androgynous
- Released: 26 September 2005 (United Kingdom)
- Recorded: Earthbeat Studios
- Genre: Trip hop, neo-psychedelia, electronica
- Length: 68:28
- Label: Harvest/EMI
- Producer: FSOL

Amorphous Androgynous chronology
The Isness (2002)	Alice in Ultraland (2005)	The Peppermint Tree and Seeds of Superconsciousness (2008)

The Future Sound of London chronology
Sessions 84-88 (2003)	Alice in Ultraland (2005)	Teachings from the Electronic Brain (2006)

Professional ratings
Review scores
Source	Rating
Secondthought.co.uk	positive
Q	2/5 stars

Alice in Ultraland is a 2005 album by experimental electronica group Amorphous Androgynous, which is a side project of The Future Sound of London.

== The album ==
Like the duo's previous album, The Isness, Alice in Ultraland has a psychedelic feel but has more electronica tracks. It features more of a funk and blues influence than The Isness. It also includes an extended version of the discarded Isness track "Yes My Brother" (titled "The Prophet" here).

== Track listing ==
All tracks by Garry Cobain and Brian Dougans

1. "The Emptiness of Nothingness" – 6:18
2. "The Witchfinder" – 7:28
3. "The Witch Hunt" – 2:54
4. "All is Harvest" – 6:39
5. "Prophet" – 4:49
6. "Indian Swing" – 5:10
7. "The Seasons Turn" – 1:01
8. "High and Dry" – 4:53
9. "Yes My Brother (You've Gotta Turn Yourself Around)" – 4:59
10. "In the Summertime of Consciousness" – 5:44
11. "Billy the Onion" – 5:28
12. "Another Fairy Tale Ending" – 4:03
13. "The World is Full of Plankton" – 8:02
14. "The Wicker Doll" – 3:00

== Crew ==
- Mikey Rowe – piano, hammond
- Stu Rowe – electric guitar
- Tim Weller – drums
- Ben Owen – flute
- The Electric Gospel Choir – female vocals
- Gary Lucas – electric guitar and acoustic bottleneck
- Dave Sanderson – vocals
- Baluji Shrivastav – sitar, tablas, dilruba
- Billy 'The Onion' Jones – harmonica
- Doree Jackson – female vocal
- Lysa – The 'witches' violin bow at the Nursery engineered by Lysa
- Mutant Funkoid – growler bass
- Stakrak – additional FX processing using the soundprok K46
- The Daughters of The Goddess 'The New Love Poetry' – narration
- Herb Moons – percussion from 'electromagnetic machines and psychedelic dreams
- Daniel Pemberton – piano, keyboards
- B. Dougans and G. Cobain – composition, production, arrangements, engineering.

== The Witchfinder ==
"The Witchfinder"

Single by Amorphous Androgynous

from the album Alice in Ultraland
- Released: 2005
- Recorded: Earthbeat Studios, London, 2005
- Genre: Psychedelia, experimental
- Length: 3:58
- Label: Harvest Records
- Songwriter(s): Garry Cobain and Brian Dougans
- Producer(s): FSOL

The Future Sound of London singles chronology
"Divinity" (2003)	"'The Witchfinder'" (2005)	"'Papua New Guinea (Herd & White Remixes)'" (2007)

"The Witchfinder" was released as a promo-single in 2005. The one-track promo is a radio-only version, which also featured on the song's animated video.

=== Track listing ===
1. The Witch Finder (Radio Edit) (3:58)

=== Crew ===
- Engineer – Yage
- Producer – FSOL
