= Hand-Made Devices =

Studio album by Polemical
- Released: 19 March 2007 Digital download (United Kingdom)
- Genre: Electronica, ambient, experimental
- Length: 42:39
- Label: FSOLdigital.com
- Producer: Brian Dougans

The Future Sound of London chronology
Zeebox 1984-1987 Vol. 2 (2007)	Hand-Made Devices (2007)	4 Forests (2007)

Hand-Made Devices is an album by The Future Sound of London under the alias Polemical; it is the first album under the pseudonym. The nature of the music is very experimental and is created almost entirely using Brian Dougans' electronic creations, including glitch devices and the like. There are videos on Dougans own YouTube channel ("STAKKERHUMANOID") demonstrating the devices he has made. The website FSOLDigital.com says that all the devices used were modified by the band. The album is available only at their digital download site.

== Track listing ==
1. Mos Son (4:36)
2. Watery Seq (1:37)
3. Matti (2:48)
4. Honher 1 (0:44)
5. Bats (2:47)
6. 15 Frames A Second (2:15)
7. Early Sun (2:14)
8. Iseuem (2:19)
9. Kontact (2:44)
10. 2 Boots Together (5:14)
11. Truma (1:49)
12. Made Formal (1:22)
13. Medium Pull (2:50)
14. Zee2006 (0:24)
15. Sub Equal (2:26)
16. At The Beginning (2:14)
17. Staggered (2:08)
18. 7 Song 7 (1:59)
19. Sk1 Song (1:13)
20. Satallite (3:03)
21. Gogs People (1:03)
22. Formings (0:29)

== Crew ==
- Composed by FSOL
- Produced by Brian Dougans
