= Global (Humanoid album) =

Studio album by Humanoid
- Released: 1989
- Genre: House
- Label: Westside
- Producers: Brian Dougans, John Laker

Brian Dougans chronology
Global (1989)	Accelerator (1992)

Global is the debut album by Humanoid (Brian Dougans of the Future Sound of London). Unlike FSOL's ambient, breakbeat and trip hop styles, it is composed largely of US style vocal house, including Ben Ofoedu, most famous for his work with duo Phats & Small in the 1990s. Also contained is the breakthrough acid house single, "Stakker Humanoid", and industrial track "Sunshine & Brick", featuring FSOL's Gaz Cobain on vocals.

== Track listing ==
1. "Stakker Humanoid"
2. "Tonight"
3. "Dream"
4. "Technoid"
5. "Cry Baby"
6. "Sunshine & Brick"
7. "The Deep"
8. "Slam"
9. "Crystals"
10. "Don't Stop"

== Crew ==
- Written by Brian Dougans
- Produced by Brian Dougans & John Laker
- Executive Producer Morgan Khan
- Mixed by Brian Dougans & John Laker
- The Deep mixed by Peter Black
- Slam vocals by Lisa Millett
- Don't Stop & The Deep rap by Ben Ofoedu
- Tonight vocals by Sharon Benson and Janet Coffie
- Sunshine & Brick vocals by Gaz Cobain
