= A Monstrous Psychedelic Bubble Exploding in Your Mind: Volume 3 =

Compilation album by Amorphous Androgynous
- Released: 01 Nov 2010/CD (United Kingdom)
- Genre: Electronica; Ambient; Progressive rock Experimental
- Producer: Garry Cobain; Brian Dougans

Amorphous Androgynous chronology
A Monstrous Psychedelic Bubble Exploding in Your Mind: Volume 2 (2009)	A Monstrous Psychedelic Bubble Exploding in Your Mind: Volume 3 (2010)

Professional ratings
Review scores
Source	Rating
The Guardian	4/5 stars

A Monstrous Psychedelic Bubble Exploding in Your Mind: Volume 3 is a 2010 compilation album with selections by the Amorphous Androgynous; it was released on CD in November 2010.

== Track listing ==
=== Disc 1 ===
1. Pierre Cavalli – Chasse à l'homme
2. Nektar – Its All In The Mind
3. Omar Rodriguez Lopez Quintet – Coma Pony
4. Luv Machine – Witches Wand
5. Golden Animals – Hi Lo
6. The Ravelles – The Psychedelic Movement
7. James Last – Here Comes The Sun
8. Ozdemir Erdogan Ve Orkestrasi – Uzun Ince Bir Yoldayim
9. The Amorphous Androgynous – In Fear Of The Electromagnetic Machine (Part 4)
10. Spencer Davis Band – Waltz With Lumbumba
11. I.D Company – Watch The Women
12. Dick Hyman – The Minotaur
13. Bruce Haack – Electric To Me Turn
14. Ennio Morricone – Gli Scatenati
15. Aphrodites Child – The Beast
16. Rotary Connection – Turn Me On
17. Journey To The East – Bill Plummer
18. Sun Dial – Exploding In Your Mind
19. Lau Nau – Kuljen Halki Kuutarhan
20. Corte Dei Miracoli – E Verra L'uomo
21. Mystic Moods – Cosmic Sea
22. The Moody Blues – The Best Way To Travel
23. Gong – Master Builder (Eye Remix)
24. Drum Circus – Now It Hurts You
25. The Animated Egg – Sock It My Way
26. Linda Perhacs – Parallelograms

=== Disc 2 ===
1. Leon Russell – The Ballad Of Hollis Brown
2. It's a Beautiful Day – White Bird
3. Donovan – Get Thy Bearings
4. Bob James – Nautilus
5. Brave New World – Soma
6. Paul Weller – Like Water Needs A Flower (Part 4 Amorphous Androgynous Remix)
7. Amon Düül II – Toxicological Whispering
8. Supergrass – Run
9. The Tremolos – Hard Time
10. Bonnie Dobson – Bird Of Space
11. Agitation Free – Laila Part 2
12. Tiny Tim – Livin' in the Sunlight, Lovin' in the Moonlight
13. John Kongos – Tokoloshe Man
14. The Amorphous Androgynous – Guru Song
15. Noah Georgeson – Find Shelter
16. Dorothy Ashby – Soul Vibrations
17. The Dave Pike Set – Spooky
18. Cosmic Michael – Now That I Found It
19. Albion Country – Albion Sunrise/Morris Medley
20. Aphrodites Child – All The Seats Were Occupied

== Crew ==
- Artwork – amorphik arts
- Mixed, Compiled by – Amorphous Androgynous
