= Sessions 84–88 =

Sessions 84-88

Compilation album by Humanoid
- Released: 10 February 2003 (United Kingdom)
- Recorded: 1984–1988
- Genres: Electronic, acid house, IDM
- Labels: Rephlex; CD(CAT 130 CD); LP(CAT 130 LP)
- Producer: Brian Dougans

The Future Sound of London chronology
Eurotechno (2003)	Sessions 84-88 (2003)	Alice in Ultraland (2005)

Professional ratings
Review scores
Source	Rating
Allmusic	4.5/5 stars

Sessions 84–88 is a compilation album released in 2003 alongside Eurotechno on the Rephlex label. Brian Dougans, under the alias Humanoid; it is mostly experimental in nature and similar to the Stakker Humanoid release from Dougans also; Sessions also includes a remix of that track.

== Track listing ==
1. Stakker Humanoid (Snowman Mix) (4:47)
2. Positive Electron (2:37)
  - Keyboards, Effects [Vox Fx] - Colin Scott, Mark McLean
3. Negative Electron (2:42)
4. Rotation (2:34)
5. Your Body Robotic (0:54)
  - Keyboards, Effects [Vox Fx] - Colin Scott, Mark McLean
6. Swamp Amp (1:24)
7. Interlude Whistle (0:05)
8. Delay Decay (0:53)
9. Motion Static (3:28)
10. E Prom Contact (2:37)
  - Keyboards, Effects [Vox Fx] - Colin Scott, Mark McLean
11. Hulme Slipway (1:38)
12. Pulsar (2:16)
13. Small Cluid (2:33)
14. Jet Stream Tokyo (3:34)
15. Cry Baby (4:53)
16. Piano In Litchen (3:09)
17. Laughing Box (4:24)
18. Fx Dial (0:06)
19. Nano Plura (3:54)
20. Well Meaning (3:09)
21. Land Of Ash (0:38)
22. Zeebox (TV Dinner Part 1) (3:24)
23. 2nd Of May (1:23)

== Crew ==
- Composed by Brian Dougans
- Produced by Brian Dougans (tracks: 1 to 15, 18) as Zeebox (tracks: 16, 17, 19 to 23)
- Co-produced by John Laker (tracks: 1, 14, 15)
- Additional keyboards and vox FX on some tracks by Mark Maclean (Buggy G. Riphead) and Colin Scott.

== See also ==
Rephlex Records discography
