= My Kingdom =

My Kingdom may refer to:

- "My Kingdom" (song), a single by Future Sound of London
- "My Kingdom", a song from the Echo & the Bunnymen album Ocean Rain
- My Kingdom (film), a 2001 British crime film
- MyKingdom, a Vietnamese toy store chain
- "My Kingdom" (Scrubs), an episode of Scrubs
