= Pulse 2 EP =

EP by Indo Tribe/Smart Systems/FSOL
- Released: 1991
- Recorded: Earthbeat Studios
- Genre: Electronica
- Label: Jumpin' & Pumpin'; 12" (12 TOT 14)
- Producer: FSOL

The Future Sound of London singles chronology
"The Pulse EP" (1991)	"Pulse 2 EP" (1991)	"Q" (1991)

Pulse 2 EP is an EP released by The Future Sound of London partly under the alias' Indo Tribe, Smart Systems and FSOL. The FSOL tracks "Stolen Documents" and "In 8" would later be put on the Accelerator album with "In 8" becoming "1 in 8".

== Track listing ==
1. Stolen Documents (Jazz Dub) - FSOL
  - Producer - Luco
2. Zip Code (Stress Ball Mix) - Smart Systems
  - Producer - Mental Cube
3. In 8 (W-O-W Mix) - FSOL
  - Producer - Mental Cube
4. I've Become What You Were (Insider Mix) - Indo Tribe
  - Producer - Mental Cube

== Crew ==
Written By Brian Dougans, Garry Cobain.
