= The Mello Hippo Disco Show =

EP by Amorphous Androgynous
- Released: 25 Nov 2002
- Recorded: Earthbeat Studios, London, 2002
- Length: 32:34
- Label: Future Sound Of London Recordings; FSOLCD103
- Producer: FSOL

The Future Sound of London chronology
Papua New Guinea Translations (2002)	'The Mello Hippo Disco Show' (2002)	Divinity (2003)

Alternative cover

Professional ratings
Review scores
Source	Rating
Allmusic	3.5/5 stars

The Mello Hippo Disco Show is an EP released by Amorphous Androgynous, a pseudonym of The Future Sound of London. Among the tracks are Life's A Flow, which was originally released on the Abbey Road mix of The Isness and Trying To Make Impermanent Things Permanent, originally premiered in 1997

== Track listing ==
1. Yo-Yo (5:21)
2. She Sells Electric Ego (6:43)
3. The Mello Hippo Disco Show (Jacknife Lee Mix) (4:23)
  - Remix – Jacknife Lee
4. Slo-Mo (4:57)
5. Hippo-Drone (2:46)
6. Trying To Make Impermanent Things Permanent (3:31)
7. The World's In Transience (1:52)
8. Life's A Flow (4:21)

== Crew ==
- Cello – Christine Jackson, Helena Binney, Jane Fenton
- Choir – Adrian Osmond, Christine Settle, Gloria Gee, Jacqueline Goddard, John-Llewelyn Evans, Jon English, Rechenda Elmhurst
- Engineer – Yage
- Flute – Chris Margary
- Harp – Thelma Owen
- Horns – Philip Eastop
- Mellotron, Organ, Keyboards – Mikey Rowe
- Oboe – Kate St. John
- Synthesizer – Daniel Pemberton
- Trombone – Fayaz Virgi, Mark Eades
- Trumpet – Dominic Glover
- Violin – Jo Archard, Mark McEvoy, Morven Bryce, Sarah Tilley
- Vocals – Anjali Saga
