= The San Monta Tapes =

Studio album by Heads of Agreement
- Released: 19 March 2007 Digital download (United Kingdom)
- Genre: Electronica, experimental
- Length: 65:23
- Label: FSOLdigital.com
- Producer: FSOL

The Future Sound of London chronology
| 4 Forests (2007) | The San Monta Tapes (2007) | Environments (2007) |

The San Monta Tapes is a side-project of The Future Sound of London, under the pseudonym Heads of Agreement, described by them as "Experiments in polyrhythmic". It is described as very unmelodic with sparse percussion loops, thus an unusual experiment and departure from the "usual" FSOL sound. In the Freeze magazine interview Cobain suggests that the project is more Brian's work than his.

== Track listing ==
1. Yellow Way (6:48)
2. Elongate (5:53)
3. San Monta (3:12)
4. Antique (3:15)
5. Earth Magnetic (4:54)
6. Still Movements (5:09)
7. La Veshter Du Aumbre (4:24)
8. Low Cloud (2:16)
9. Bump (5:15)
10. Ukashan (3:42)
11. Slow Storm (1:35)
12. Northern Desert (0:34)
13. Cold Ground (3:36)
14. Waves (6:01)
15. Underpass (0:42)
16. Coasts (3:46)
17. Tree Bark (1:36)
18. Cow Fxd (4:33)
19. Pushed (1:32)

== Crew ==
Brian Dougans, Garry Cobain.
