= Cascade (single) =

Single by Future Sound of London

from the album Lifeforms
- Released: 25 October 1993
- Recorded: Earthbeat Studios
- Genre: Ambient techno
- Length: 36:31
- Label: Astralwerks; Cat.
- Songwriter(s): FSOL
- Producer(s): FSOL

Future Sound of London singles chronology
"Liquid Insects" (1993)	"Cascade" (1993)	"Lifeforms" (1993)

Music video
- "Cascade" on YouTube

"Cascade" is the first single from the British electronic music duo Future Sound of London's second album, Lifeforms (1994). The record entered the Dance Singles Chart at number 6 on 6 November 1993. Garry Cobain said that the band "saw it as a great opportunity to write another album, but based around one song."

== Track listing ==
1. "Cascade: Part 1" (7:22)
2. "Cascade: Part 2" (9:38)
3. "Cascade: Part 3" (4:24)
4. "Cascade: Part 4" (4:39)
5. "Cascade: Part 5" (6:12)
6. "Cascade: Shortform" (4:16)

== Crew ==
- Written, produced, performed by FSOL
- Artwork by Buggy G. Riphead.
- The first sleeve to feature The Electronic Brain, the model by Olaf Wendt.
- Part 3 is essentially an extended version of "Elaborate Burn", another song on Lifeforms.

== Charts ==
Chart (1993)	Peak position
Europe (Eurochart Hot 100)	90
UK Singles (CIN)	27
UK Dance Singles (CIN)	6

== Cascade 2020 ==
In September 2020 FSOL released "Cascade 2020", an album that is a reimagination of the "Cascade" single from 1993. It includes recreations of "Cascade: Part 1" and "Cascade: Part 4", as well as two new parts of the piece (sixth and seventh) and nine other new tracks that are separately titled.

The result was described as "a sprawl of gloopy acid downbeats, spine-tracing trance arps, intergalactic steppers techno ballistics and a ravishing jungle mix, reconnecting strands of arcane prog rock into dub and computer music".
