= 4 Forests =

Studio album by Part-Sub-Merged
- Released: 19 March 2007 Digital download (United Kingdom)
- Genre: Electronica, ambient, experimental
- Length: 35:50
- Label: FSOLdigital.com
- Producer: Brian Dougans

The Future Sound of London chronology
Hand-Made Devices (2007)	4 Forests (2007)	The San Monta Tapes (2007)

4 Forests is an experimental album by Brian Dougans under the alias Part-Sub-Merged from 2007 which was released on The Future Sound of London's digital download website. It is the soundtrack to a short film made by the duo called "Part-Sub-Merged" to be released on FSOLdigital.com at some point in the near future. The music is darker than his "Polemical " work with analogue techno beats and synth ambience.

== Track listing ==
1. Second Glance (3:34)
2. Slight Movement (3:17)
3. Roadhedge (3:26)
4. Wooden Gage (5:02)
5. Opposite Side (5:02)
6. Naked (1:26)
7. Mind Altered (2:35)
8. In The Forest (1:03)
9. Held (4:42)
10. Hallae (1:20)
11. First Breath (2:42)
12. Cark (3:01)

== Crew ==
Composed and produced by Brian Dougans.
