= The Far-Out Son of Lung and the Ramblings of a Madman =

EP by Future Sound of London
- Released: 15 May 1995
- Recorded: Earthbeat Studios, London, 1995
- Genre: Electronic; Experimental; Ambient
- Length: 23:54
- Label: Virgin Records
- Producer: FSOL

Future Sound of London chronology
Expander (1994)	The Far-Out Son of Lung and the Ramblings of a Madman (1995)	My Kingdom (1996)

Back cover
- Back cover of the EP

Professional ratings
Review scores
Source	Rating
Allmusic	3/5 stars

The Far-Out Son of Lung and the Ramblings of a Madman is an EP which was released by Future Sound of London in 1995 to promote the album ISDN. Unlike the band's other EPs, there are no variations on a theme here, simply album versions of the tracks segued together in a new way. The only exception is Snake Hips, which appears in an extended version sometimes referred to as "Snake Hips (Parts 1 & 2)".

== Track listing ==
1. "Far-Out Son of Lung and the Ramblings of a Madman" – 4:41
2. "Snake Hips" – 8:33
3. "Smokin' Japanese Babe" – 5:42
4. "Amoeba" – 5:00

== Chart position ==
Year	Chart	Position
1995	UK Singles Chart	#22

== Crew ==
- Written, produced and performed by FSOL.
- Artwork by Buggy G. Riphead and FSOL.
- The man depicted on the cover and in album artwork is "Vit", the Chinese restaurateur down the street from FSOL's studio.
