= Environments 3 =

Studio album by The Future Sound of London
- Released: 7 June 2010
- Genre: Electronic, ambient, IDM, experimental
- Length: 61:02
- Label: FSOLDigital, Jumpin' & Pumpin'
- Producer: The Future Sound of London

The Future Sound of London chronology
| Environments II (2008) | Environments 3 (2010) | Environments 4 (2012) |

Environments 3 is the third in The Future Sound of London's "Environments" series of albums, released on 7 June 2010. Unlike previous FSOLDigital releases, the album was not made available as a download several months before the CD release. Because of this, the record was heard several weeks in advance due to early shipping from the website Juno. The record sleeve announced a fourth album in the series.

== The album ==
Continuing from the previous volumes in the series, Environments 3 begins in a neoclassical, ambient vein, but instead of the epic sound of Environments 2, takes the music in a darker, more insular direction, reflecting the sounds of the band's 1996 album Dead Cities, from which elements of some tracks are derived. However, the album remains somber and ambient for the most part.

== Track listing ==
1. "Viewed from an Obscure Angle" (3:10)
2. "Summer's Dream" (4:16)
3. "Sunken Ships" (3:40)
4. "The Empty Land" (5:40)
5. "A Glitch in Cellular Memory" (3:21)
6. "Recollection" (3:22)
7. "Accompaniment for Melodious Expression" (3:05)
8. "Absolution" (3:39)
9. "The Oldest Lady" (1:19)
10. "A Diversionary Tactic" (3:07)
11. "The Silent Place" (2:52)
12. "Out of Sync Child" (2:00)
13. "Hall of Mirrors" (1:34)
14. "End of the World" (4:35)
15. "Sense of Being" (1:50)
16. "Surface Water" (3:42)
17. "Heart Sick Chord" (8:10)
18. "Repetition is a Form of Change" (1:45)

== Crew ==
- Producer - Future Sound Of London, The
- Written - By Brian Dougans, Garry Cobain
- 1, 9, 14 written - By Brian Dougans, Garry Cobain, Daniel Pemberton
- Engineered by Yage
