= Dead Cities (album) =

Studio album by The Future Sound of London
- Released: 28 October 1996
- Recorded: 1996
- Studios: Earthbeat Studios, London
- Genres: IDM, ambient techno, big beat, dark ambient
- Length: 70:11
- Label: Virgin
- Producer: The Future Sound of London

The Future Sound of London chronology
ISDN (1994)	Dead Cities (1996)	Environments (2007)

Singles from Dead Cities
- 1. "My Kingdom" Released: 14 October 1996; 2. "We Have Explosive" Released: 31 March 1997

Professional ratings
Review scores
Source	Rating
AllMusic	4/5 stars
Alternative Press	5/5 stars
Entertainment Weekly	B+
The Guardian	4/5 stars
Muzik	4/5 stars
Pitchfork	8.0/10
Q	3/5 stars
Sputnikmusic	4/5
Tom Hull – on the Web	B

Dead Cities is the third studio album by the British electronic music duo The Future Sound of London. It was released through Virgin Records in October 1996. The record entered the Dance Albums Chart at No. 2 and the Albums Chart at No. 26.

== Overview ==
The album art consisted of 3D graphics, photography, and writing complementing the album's themes, combined via digital image editing. This was created primarily by the band and then-frequent artistic collaborator Buggy G. Riphead. A limited edition release of the album included a 196-page book, containing additional artwork and writing in the same style.

"My Kingdom" and "We Have Explosive" were released as singles. The "My Kingdom" music video was directed by the same artistic collaboration, whereas the "We Have Explosive" music video was directed by 2D-animator Run Wrake.

This album marked the start of a collaboration between the band and modern minimalist composer Max Richter. The composer began as a pianist but ultimately worked on several of the album's tracks helping to co-write the track "Max". After Dead Cities, Richter continued to work with FSOL contributing to their Amorphous Androgynous albums The Isness (2002) and The Peppermint Tree and Seeds of Superconsciousness (2008).

== Track listing ==
Though the album contains 13 tracks, the track listing on the back insert of the CD is ambiguous, as 15 song titles are listed, with most of the second half of songs not numbered. The common interpretation, confirmed by the promo edition of the CD, is listed here:

1. "Herd Killing" – 2:37
2. "Dead Cities" – 6:37
3. "Her Face Forms in Summertime" – 5:38
4. "We Have Explosive" – 6:19
5. "Everyone in the World Is Doing Something Without Me" – 4:10
6. "My Kingdom" – 5:47
7. "Max" – 2:48
8. "Antique Toy" – 5:43
9. – 6:57
  - "Quagmire" – 5:13
  - "In a State of Permanent Abyss" – 1:44
10. "Glass" – 5:38
11. "Yage" – 7:32
12. – 5:32
  - "Vit Drowning" – 4:48
  - "Through Your Gills I Breathe" – 0:44
13. – 4:46
  - "First Death in the Family" – 2:18
  - silence – 1:00
  - "Dead Cities Reprise" (hidden track by Headstone Lane) – 1:28

== Samples and other information ==
- "Herd Killing" is the shorter edit of a remix of track 4; the full version is called "We Have Explosive (Herd Killing Mix)" on a single. Both feature several samples from the Run-DMC album Tougher Than Leather.
- "Dead Cities", contains a vocal sample of Laurence Fishburne from the film Deep Cover.
- "We Have Explosive" was used in the second game in the "wipE'out"" series, wipE'out" 2097, for the original PlayStation, the film Mortal Kombat Annihilation, and also over the closing titles of the Black Mirror season 7 episode "Plaything".
- The vocals on "Everyone in the World Is Doing Something Without Me" were performed by Canadian opera singer Rebecca Caine.
- "My Kingdom" prominently features:
  - A vocal sample of "Rachael's Song" (aka "Rachel's Song") by Vangelis, from the Blade Runner soundtrack (1982).
  - A sample of the intro to "Cockeye's Song", and rearranged samples of Gheorghe Zamfir's pan flute riff in "Cockeye's Song" and "Childhood Memories", taken from Ennio Morricone's soundtrack for Once Upon a Time in America (1984).
  - A guitar sample taken from the song "Phalarn Dawn" off Ozric Tentacles's album Pungent Effulgent (1989).
- The title of track 11, "Yage", was a previous alias of FSOL, and still their alias for their own sound engineering credits.
- The title of track 12, "Vit Drowning", refers to Vit, a Chinese restaurant owner friend with the artists. His face appears on the "Far-out Son of Lung" cover, and he appears in the "Teachings From The Electronic Brain II" and "My Kingdom" videos"
- Whether it was coincidental or otherwise, the album's final track, "Dead Cities Reprise" (hidden track by Headstone Lane), is of a very similar nature to the predominant sound and style that FSOL adopted for their following album, The Isness, released under their alias Amorphous Androgynous (except in the US, where it was released as FSOL for commercial reasons).

== Charts ==
Album – UK Albums Chart

Year	Chart	Position
1996	UK Albums Chart	26
UK Dance Albums Chart	2

Singles – UK singles chart

Year	Single	Chart	Position
1996	"My Kingdom"	UK singles chart	13
1997	"We Have Explosive"	UK singles chart	12
