= The Isness =

2002 neo-psychedelic studio album

Studio album by Amorphous Androgynous (UK version); The Future Sound of London (US version)
- Released: August 5, 2002 (United Kingdom); August 13, 2002 (United States)
- Recorded: 1997 – 2002
- Studio: Earthbeat Studios, London
- Genre: Neo-psychedelia; psychedelic rock; psychedelic pop; space rock; raga rock; trip hop
- Length: 1:03:30 (UK version); 1:03:25 (US version)
- Label: Artful; Hypnotic
- Producer: The Future Sound of London

Amorphous Androgynous (UK version); The Future Sound of London (US version) chronology
Tales of Ephidrina (1993)	The Isness (2002)	Alice in Ultraland (2005)

The Future Sound of London chronology
ISDN Show (1997)	The Isness (2002)	Eurotechno (2003)

Alternative cover
- Cover for the two disc expanded version The Isness and the Otherness.

Professional ratings
Aggregate scores
Source	Rating
Metacritic	62/100
Review scores
Source	Rating
AllMusic	3/5 stars
E!	B+
The Guardian	4/5 stars
Mojo	3.5/5 stars
NME	8/10
Pitchfork	8.0/10
Q	2/5 stars
Release Magazine	6/10
Sputnikmusic	4/5
Uncut	7/10

The Isness is a studio album by the British group Amorphous Androgynous, an alias of the British duo The Future Sound of London, released in the United Kingdom on August 5, 2002 on Artful Records before being released under their main moniker in the United States on August 13, 2002 on Hypnotic Records. An expanded version was later released in the United Kingdom in 2004, titled The Isness and the Otherness, a two disc special edition containing The Isness on disc one and The Otherness, containing additional tracks and recordings, on disc two.

== Background and composition ==
The Isness features a markedly neo-psychedelic style compared to Garry Cobain and Brian Dougans' previous releases as a result of personal issues, their frustration with trends in electronica and their growing interest in crate digging for older music at charity shops, listening to them equally for inspiration rather than only sampling them. They initially began exploring their new musical interests through radio broadcasts in the late 1990s. Dougans had been concerned for Cobain as he was regularly traveling to practice yoga in India while showing signs of an unknown illness, saying that he had "wonder[ed] where" and "who [...] he was"; Cobain also claimed that "the positive eons of [...] computers were contributing to his illness". In a press release given with the initial promotional version of The Isness, songs such as the Beatles' "Tomorrow Never Knows", David Bowie's "Space Oddity", the Rolling Stones' "2000 Light Years from Home" and the Verve's "Bitter Sweet Symphony", as well as albums such as Mercury Rev's Deserter's Songs, the 1998 remix album Panthalassa: The Music of Miles Davis 1969–1974 and Ananda Shankar's 1970 self-titled album were listed as musical influences; they especially drew inspiration from the latter for the album's emphasis on sitars. They both described the intent of the album as being "an ostentatious abundance of sound", with the press release adding that it contained "humour, love, optimism, healing, spirituality, exotic colours and exotic climes, [and] an almost child-like vulnerability".

=== The Abbey Road mix ===
The original 2002 release of The Isness exists in two distinct versions as a result of a miscommunication between British and American distributors. Original promotional versions, mastered at Abbey Road Studios, were set for release in May 2002; this was postponed as according to Cobain, there was an excess of "masculine energy" surrounding the commercial viability of the comeback of The Future Sound of London. The mix is significantly different from the final mix of the British version, as "The Mello Hippo Disco Show" is an entirely different version, "The Galaxial Pharmaceutical" exists as a full track rather than being cut in two, "Guru Song" features lyrics sung by a female vocalist, "Elysian Feels" contains a significantly different breakbeat and is in a higher key, and both "Divinity" and "Go Tell It to the Trees Egghead" feature in slightly longer forms. It also features "Yes My Brother" and "Goodbye Sky", which are not present in the second promotional version and British release, replaced instead by "The Lovers" and "The Isness". The album was reduced in content and re-mixed after British executive decisions for its second promotional version, which was released with a track listing similar to the final version, but in the same sleeve as the initial version, leading to a number of misleading reviews with incorrect track titles. In addition, it was released under their previously retired alias Amorphous Androgynous, being their first release under the moniker in almost a decade. The final released version of the album in Britain was identical to the second promotional version, with the addition of the album's short instrumental title track and a slightly edited version of "The Mello Hippo Disco Show". The vinyl version of the album contained an exclusive track entitled "Chawawah", only previously heard on the band's website in 2001.

Upon the album's release in August 2002, more confusion occurred when the band's American label, Hypnotic, mistakenly distributed 2,500 copies of the first promotional version's original mix of the album as a final version of the album. The album was recalled, but many copies had been bought, were redistributed, and still exist as rarities. The UK-exclusive two-disc compilation The Isness & The Otherness (with The Otherness released as its own disc in the US) was released in 2004, compiling most of the tracks, plus selected remixes and some exclusive pieces, only missing the Abbey Road mix of "The Galaxial Pharmaceutical", plus "Yes My Brother", which featured in an extended version as "The Prophet" on their 2005 album Alice in Ultraland. Cobain and Dougans subsequently went on to regard the Abbey Road mix of The Isness as its definitive version, reissuing it on vinyl on Record Store Day in 2018.

== Track listing ==
=== Abbey Road mix; first promotional version and US Hypnotic release ===
1. "Elysian Feels" – 6:03
2. "The Mello Hippo Disco Show" – 4:32
3. "Goodbye Sky" (reprise) – 1:10
4. "Osho" – 2:14
5. "The Galaxial Pharmaceutical" – 15:03
6. "Yes My Brother" – 0:52
7. "Go Tell It To the Trees Egghead" – 5:31
8. "Divinity" – 7:57
9. "Guru Song" – 3:45
10. "Her Tongue Is Like a Jellyfish" – 2:33
11. "Meadows" – 3:28
12. "High Tide on the Sea of Flesh" – 5:25
13. "Goodbye Sky" – 4:43

=== Second promotional version; UK Artful release ===
1. "The Lovers" – 6:04
2. "The Isness" – 3:00
3. "The Mello Hippo Disco Show" – 5:25
4. "Goodbye Sky (Reprise)" – 1:14
5. "Elysian Feels" – 4:47
6. "Go Tell It To the Trees Egghead" – 4:28
7. "Divinity" – 7:27
8. "Guru Song" – 2:49
9. "Osho" – 2:14
10. "Her Tongue Is Like a Jellyfish" – 2:34
11. "Meadows" – 3:29
12. "High Tide on the Sea of Flesh" – 5:27
13. "The Galaxial Pharmaceutical" – 14:32

=== The Otherness ===
1. "Elysian Feels" (Abbey Road version) – 6:03
2. "Yo-Yo" (Abbey Road version) – 4:31
3. "Goodbye Sky" – 4:34
4. "The Lovers (Love Is the Lover)" – 7:02
5. "Maharishi Raga" – 4:12
6. "The Band (Divinity)" – 6:02
7. "Rural Green" – 3:43
8. "Chawawah" – 4:03
9. "She Sells Electric Ego" – 6:41
10. "Chinese Whispers" – 1:00
11. "Slomo" – 3:16
12. "The Conga Run" – 5:38
13. "The Ram" – 1:55
14. "Toy Piano" – 1:03

=== Vinyl version ===
1. "The Lovers" – 5:52
2. "High Tide on the Sea of Flesh" – 5:24
3. "The Mello Hippo Disco Show" – 5:49
4. "Divinity" – 7:25
5. "Guru Song" – 2:45
6. "Osho" – 2:12
7. "Her Tongue Is Like a Jellyfish" – 2:35
8. "Meadows" – 3:27
9. "Elysian Feels" – 4:45
10. "Goodbye Sky" – 1:11
11. "Go Tell It To the Trees Egghead" – 4:25
12. "Chawawah" – 4:02
13. "The Isness" – 2:59
14. "The Galaxial Pharmaceutical" – 14:30

== Personnel ==
According to the liner notes given by Dougans and Cobain:

- Richard Ashcroft, Alex Balanescu, Donovan, Clio Gould, Levine Andrade, Sue Monks, Philip Bainbridge, Christene Charly, Gary Lucas, Stinky Rowe, Baluji Shrivastav, Mikey Rowe, Randy Hope, Taylor Gospel Choir, Chris Margary, Fayaz Virgi, Kevin Robinson, The Cabbage Orchestra, The Major, Sam Pickins, Albert Ross Junior, Sir Daniel Pemberton, Bertie, Sara Gepp, The Vaudeville Stage and Big Screen FX Singers, Catrin Jones, Ben Pitt, Jeniffer Underhill, Vulu Krakovic, Charles Cross, Herb Moon, Merlin Sturt, Wayne Urqhart, Future Sonic Orchestra Limited, Linda Lewis, Joss, Dominic Glover, Anjali Sage, Mike McEvoy (AKA Michael J McEvoy), Phil Eastop, Kate St. John, Morven Bryce, Helen Binney, Jane Fenton, Christene Jackson, Joanna Archard, Herbie Flowers, Sarah Tilley, Mark Eades, GloriaGee, Rechenda Elmhurst, John-Llewelyn Evans, Christine Settle, Jacqueline Goddard, Adrian Osmond, Jon English, Thelma Owen, Alexa Hamilton, Tim Weller, Tom Swift, Dan Swift, and Big Freddy Teddy as well as long-time collaborators Max Richter, Philip Pin, Riz Maslen and Richie Thomas. Dougans and Cobain are credited as Stone Freshwaters and The One Man Band of Cosmos respectively.

=== Album credits ===
- Engineer – Stone Freshwaters, Yage
- Producer – FSOL
- Written By – B. Dougans, G. Cobain
