= Lifeforms (The Future Sound of London album) =

1994 studio album by the Future Sound of London

Studio album by The Future Sound of London
- Released: 23 May 1994
- Genres: Ambient; experimental techno
- Length: 92:33
- Label: Virgin
- Producer: The Future Sound of London

The Future Sound of London chronology
Accelerator (1992)	Lifeforms (1994)	ISDN (1995)

Singles from Lifeforms
- 1. "Cascade" Released: 25 October 1993; 2. "Lifeforms" Released: 1 August 1994

Full cover picture
- The "Witch Girl" in a desert landscape

Lifeforms is the second studio album by the British electronic music duo The Future Sound of London. It was released on 23 May 1994 by Virgin Records. It entered the Dance Albums Chart at No. 1 and the Albums Chart at No. 6.

== Background ==
The Future Sound of London began work on the album around the same time as they were finishing Tales of Ephidrina, and the more complex, ambient direction they were taking resulted in Lifeforms. The artwork also progressed from previous works, with soon-to-be familiar images of the "Witch Girl" Sheuneen Ta and the "Spike" computer model having been previously used on the group's Cascade EP.

== Reception ==
Professional ratings
Review scores
Source	Rating
AllMusic	5/5 stars
Music Week	4/5 stars
NME	8/10
Resident Advisor	4.3/5
Select	2/5 medals
Sputnikmusic	5/5
Tom Hull – on the Web	B+

Lifeforms achieved commercial success and produced hit singles such as "Cascade" and "Lifeforms". It entered the Dance Albums Chart at No. 1 and the Albums Chart at No. 6. The album was certified silver by the British Phonographic Industry (BPI) for over 60,000 units sold. It was later licensed to Astralwerks for release in the US.

AllMusic called it "one of the best experimental techno releases of the '90s" and "an inventive, fascinating aural experience, as rich and detailed as the Orb's best work."

The Swedish band Carbon Based Lifeforms got the idea of its name partly from this album.

== Track listing ==
All tracks are written by The Future Sound of London (Garry Cobain and Brian Dougans), except where noted.

Disc one
No.	Title	Length
1.	"Cascade"	5:59
2.	"Ill Flower"	3:24
3.	"Flak" (Cobain, Dougans, Robert Fripp, Andrew Grossart, Trevor Nightingale, William Thomson, Paul Williams)	4:53
4.	"Bird Wings"	1:30
5.	"Dead Skin Cells"	6:50
6.	"Lifeforms"	5:18
7.	"Eggshell"	6:45
8.	"Among Myselves"	5:52

Disc two
No.	Title	Length
1.	"Domain"	2:48
2.	"Spineless Jelly"	4:41
3.	"Interstat"	0:55
4.	"Vertical Pig"	6:44
5.	"Cerebral"	3:30
6.	"Life Form Ends"	5:03
7.	"Vit"	6:48
8.	"Omnipresence" (Cobain, Dougans, Klaus Schulze)	6:39
9.	"Room 208"	6:12
10.	"Elaborate Burn"	3:15
11.	"Little Brother"	5:13

== Personnel ==
- The Future Sound of London – production, writing

Additional musicians

- Robert Fripp – guitar textures and bytes on "Flak"
- Toni Halliday – vocal texture on "Cerebral"
- Ozric Tentacles – sound bytes on "Flak"
- Talvin Singh – Tabla Tronics on "Life Form Ends"
- Yage – engineering

Additional personnel

- The Future Sound of London – art direction
- Buggy G. Riphead – art direction
- Peter Atkinson – photography
- Stephen Marks – photography
- P. Knott – photography
- Alistair Shay – photography
- Martin Poole – photography
- Olaf Wendt – CGI design
- Rob Manley – A&R

== Charts ==
Chart (1994)	Peak position
UK Albums (Official Charts)	6
UK Dance Albums Chart (CIN)	1

== Certification ==
Certifications for Lifeforms
Region	Certification	Certified units/sales
United Kingdom (BPI)	Gold	100,000^{‡}
^{‡} Sales+streaming figures based on certification alone.
