= The Woodlands of Old =

Studio album by Yage
- Released: 12 May 2008/Digital download (United Kingdom)
- Genre: Electronica, ambient, world, experimental
- Length: 60:15
- Label: FSOLdigital.com
- Producer: FSOL

The Future Sound of London chronology
The Peppermint Tree and Seeds of Superconsciousness (2007)	The Woodlands of Old (2008)	From the Archives Vol. 5 (2008)

The Woodlands of Old is a 2008 album by the Future Sound of London under the alias of their "engineer" "Yage". It is an electronic record foremost but using more traditional drums and percussion, ex-Propellerheads member Will White contributes drums, along with a number of ethnic sounding instruments, which tie in with the band's description of the album suggesting "the deserts of the middle east to the rain forests of Brazil". A CD version of the album was released on 13 October 2008.

== Track listing ==
1. The Woodlands of Old (4:12)
2. An Odd Question From A Forest Bird (3:33)
3. From Thunder That Shakes (3:21)
4. The Yage Letters (3:43)
5. The Hunters Moon (3:22)
6. Mountain Cloud Descending (3:58)
7. Procession (4:04)
8. Crow Hushing The Floating Woods (5:19)
9. The Mahogany Tree (Shelterd) (2:40)
10. He Laughed Himself To The Centre (5:55)
11. Unsettling Sky (2:44)
12. Humbled Before Your Presence (3:24)
13. Who Had Such Foolish Care (3:59)
14. Circle The Corn (3:03)
15. Centipede (3:02)
16. Dry Wind Blown (3:44)
17. Haxaal's Dream (4:04)
18. Heavily He Flies (4:13)
19. The Dark Pines (3:16)
20. The Sun Lends Warmth And Comfort (2:33)
21. A Welcome Beneath Night's Darkness (0:59)

== Crew ==
- Produced, composed - Yage
- Drums - Will White
