= We Have Explosive =

EP by The Future Sound of London
- Released: March 31, 1997
- Recorded: Earthbeat Studios, London.
- Genres: EDM; big beat; electronic rock
- Length: 48:21
- Labels: Virgin; Cat.VSCDX 1616; Astralwerks; Cat. ASW 6196
- Producer: FSOL

The Future Sound of London chronology
"My Kingdom" (1996)	We Have Explosive (1997)	"Stakker Humanoid 2001" (2001)

Professional ratings
Review scores
Source	Rating
Allmusic	link

"We Have Explosive" is a song by The Future Sound of London, released in 1997. It was the band's most successful single, getting to number 12 in the UK Singles Chart in 1997. It features prominent sampling of the Run-DMC album Tougher Than Leather. Part three also samples "Rockchester" by Fats Comet.

== The single ==
The successful standout single from FSOL's Dead Cities LP was, as with other FSOL singles, released with a plethora of remixed versions of it. It is a harder, more techno-oriented song, which is rare for the band; the track became well known to many after being featured in the 1996 hit video game wipE'out" 2097. The song is the first track on the soundtrack, remixes of it were also featured on the other versions of the soundtrack; the "Herd Killing" mix was used in the intro sequence.

A remixed version also appeared on the soundtrack for Mortal Kombat Annihilation.

The song also appears during the credits of Black Mirror Season 7 episode "Plaything."

== Track listing ==
The track listing below is the "CD-Maxi" listing.

1. "We Have Explosive (Pt. 1)" (7:19)
2. "We Have Explosive (Pt. 2) (Remixed by Leon Mar)" (2:48)
3. "We Have Explosive (Pt. 3)" (5:04)
4. "We Have Explosive (Pt. 4)" (6:17)
5. "We Have Explosive (Pt. 5)" (7:53)
6. "We Have Explosive (Oil Funk Remix)" (3:36)
7. "We Have Explosive (Mantronik Plastic Formula #1)" (5:38)
8. "We Have Explosive (Oil Dub)" (6:23)
9. "We Have Explosive (Radio Mix)" (3:27)

== Chart position ==
Year	Chart	Position
1997	UK Singles Chart	#12

== Crew credits ==
- Artwork By [Additional Design] - Ian Kay
- Artwork By [Layout And Typography] - FSOL
- Artwork By [Oil Texture] - Buggy G Riphead
- Artwork By [Sleeve Image] - Run Wrake from the film Juke Box
- Engineer - Yage
- Producer, Written-By - Future Sound Of London, The
- Samples of Guitar stab, wah guitar and vocal yell from, among other things, Run DMC LP "Tougher Than Leather".
