= Henry Roland =

American daredevil and "human fly"

Henry D. Roland
- Roland, circa 1924
- Born: March 2, 1894; Germany
- Died: October 7, 1937 (aged 43); Ottway / Greeneville, Tennessee, US
- Cause of death: Fall from height
- Other names: The Human Fly
- Years active: 1924–1937
- Known for: Free climbing tall buildings
- Spouse(s): Anna Roland (m. ?. – div. 1928); Blannis Roland
- Children: 1

Henry Roland, also known as D.D. Roland, was an American daredevil and "human fly" who became famous for free climbing buildings around the country in the 1920s and 1930s. He began his high flying antics in 1924 to public acclaim. Roland identified himself as The Human Fly, a name that was also used by several other performers with similar acts.

== Career ==
Roland traveled the country with his act and climbed buildings as far apart as Texas and Montana.

Roland's high-profile stunts included climbs of the Cleveland Hotel, the Davis County Courthouse, the Kearny County Courthouse, and Allentown National Bank. Roland's 1926 climb of the Tribune Building in Tampa, Florida, attracted more than 15,000 viewers. Roland survived one highly publicized fall in his career: "he fell from the third floor of the McAlpin Hotel in New York City. He crashed through an awning on the way down and this broke the force of the fall. It nearly cost him his life, however, and only after many months in a hospital was he able to continue his dare devil occupation." Even a close brush with death could not keep Roland from performing, and he worked to make his shows ever more thrilling after his return.

== Death ==
Roland's final act occurred in Greeneville, Tennessee, in 1937. He again fell during a stunt but this time there was no awning to break his fall. A contemporary trade magazine set up what happened: "It had long been his ambition to develop a new act that would give more thrills than his former acts, and last winter he realized it by bringing out a high trapeze and swaying pole, performed without a safety net, 110 feet above the ground. At the Ottway Fair, Greenville [sic], Tenn., October 7, while completing the finale of his trapeze, a forward somersault to ankle catch, a gust of wind blew his trapeze bar from under him and he fell to his death." His death certificate identified a "broken right femur, broken bones of hands, probably internal injuries, probably fractured skull" and concluded that he was killed by a "crush injury" secondary to his fall.
