= Eurotechno =

Studio album by Stakker
- Released: 27 January 2003 (UK)
- Recorded: 1989
- Genres: Acid techno; acid house; avant-garde; rave
- Length: 25:39
- Label: Rephlex
- Producer: Marek Pytel

Detail
- Cover sticker.

Eurotechno refers to the musical soundtrack by English group Stakker for their 1989 experimental short film of the same name. The original film was an avant-garde experiment and features rapidly shifting colourful computer graphics, reflecting the influence of rave culture. Although the visuals of the film were primarily the work of Stakker members Marek Pytel, Mark McClean and Colin Scott, the musical soundtrack was largely the work of Brian Dougans, later of The Future Sound of London. The 25-minute soundtrack was recorded using a Roland TB-303, and reflects the fast-shifting momentum of the film by incorporating fragmented elements of acid house, Chicago house and Detroit techno that shift after their brief appearances, thus contributing to an intricately layered style.

The film was released by Virgin Video Music in 1989 and became influential on other film-makers, although the soundtrack itself did not initially receive its own release. Over the years, the music proved influential on other producers, including Squarepusher and Aphex Twin. The latter released the soundtrack on CD and vinyl for the first time in January 2003 on his Rephlex label, which had been inspired by the music. The album received positive reviews for its early acid techno sound and was hailed as innovative. It was followed by another release of early Brian Dougans music, Sessions 84-88, later that year.

== Film ==
Eurotechno was a 1989 film created by video artists Stakker, made up of Mark Mclean, Marek Paytel and Colin Scott. One of the British rave scene's earliest visual projects, the film was a "massive statement" that explored possibilities for audio-visual presentation, and featured colourful graphics, such as multi-coloured polygons, cut-and-pasted and edited with quick shifts. Future Music regard it as "one of those early, computery, weirdy, acidy colourful things." Incorporating microcinematography from Sinclair Stammers Post Production, the film's innovative usage of colourisation was achieved using the CVI, Quantel Mirage and Quantel Encore. Music Technology magazine referred to the film as "audio-visual avant-garde." Although Scott felt the film was built on "fairly random editing," Pytel argued it to be a "formalist" work.

The music and sound for Eurotechno was credited to Brian Dougans, McClean and Scott, with Dougans responsible for performing the music. He found a Roland TB-303 – a synthesiser pivotal to acid house music – in the basement of his college, and proceeded to feature it heavily in the production of the film's soundtrack. With its origins in the early days of Madchester, it was one of the producer's earliest projects. Dougan's 1988 acid house hit "Stakker Humanoid", regarded as one of the earliest examples of acid house to break into the mainstream, also originated from the producer's work with Stakker, and was described as a companion project. Released on VHS by Virgin Video Music in 1989, Eurotechno went on to become a "dance-culture classic" and a pioneering video for "bedroom digital production," even influencing a television advertisement for Pot Noodle. The advertisement, 1993's Computer Graphic, was controversial for inducing seizures on several viewers.

== Composition ==
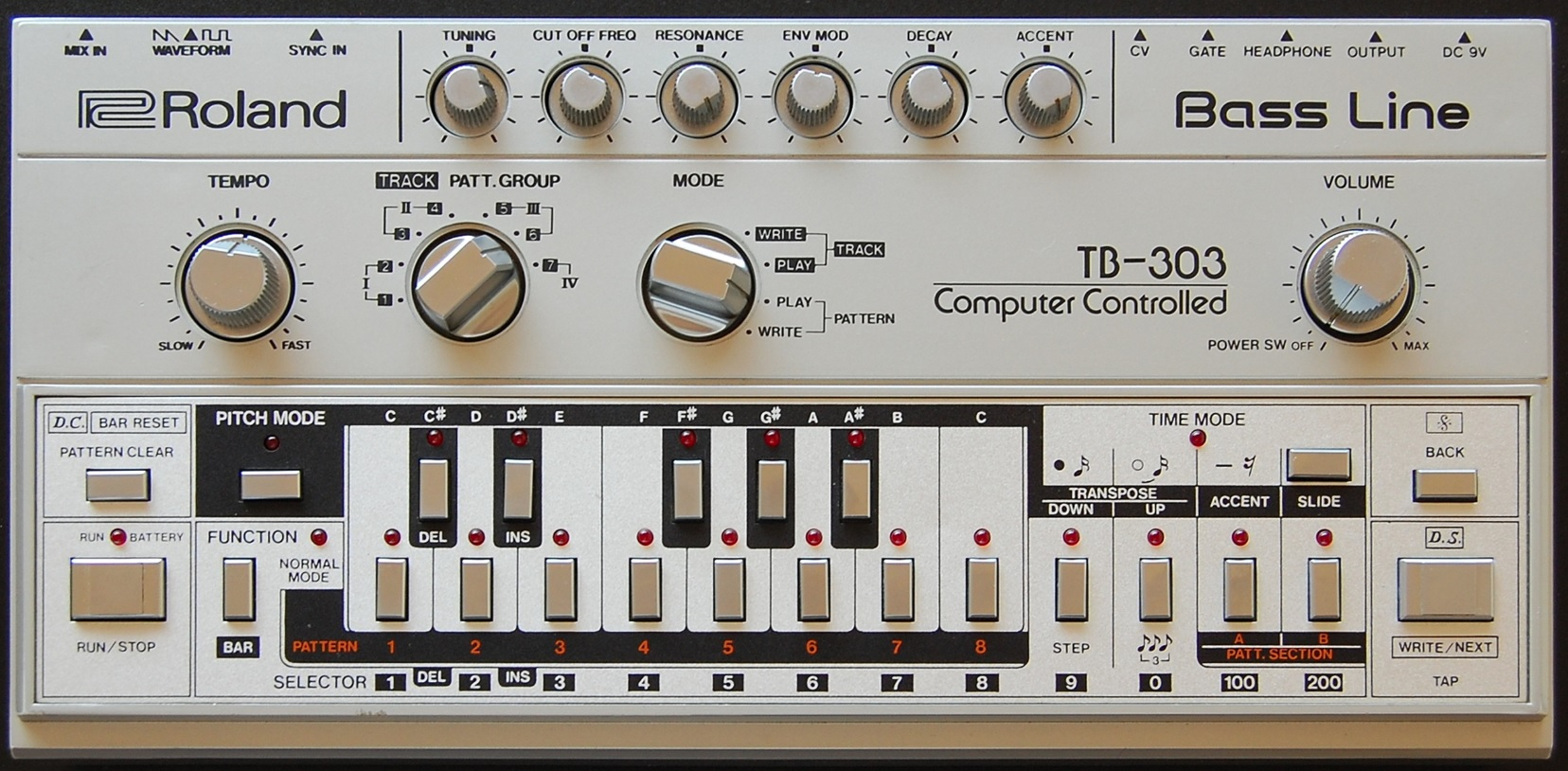
The music on Eurotechno incorporates the Roland TB-303.

The music of Eurotechno reflects the fragmented, fast-cut editing of the film by incorporating quick jumps between musical styles, including elements of Chicago house, Detroit techno, European dance music and foreshadows of Ibiza house. The 25-minute soundtrack is split into 21 tracks, with intentionally jarring edits between musical sections ensuring no recognisable patterns or beats last for much longer than a brief appearance. One journalist described the result as "a conveyor belt of sounds." The soundtrack is intricately layered, and throughout the music are "squelchy" Roland TB-303 sounds, pounding grooves, build-ups and breakdowns, 'searing' techno and acidic bass lines. The sounds of the soundtrack reflect the acid house scene of the era. The liner notes of the album release refer to it as an acid techno record.

The 21 tracks throughout the soundtrack are not individually titled, instead being numbered as different parts of "Eurotechno" on the album release. According to Andy Beta of Pitchfork, the frequencies in the music quickly distort into four-on-the-floor rhythms, but soon undergo "permutations" with "harsh powertools buzz" surrounding and cutting them. He compared the frenzy of "clashing sounds" to Carl Stalling cartoons, due to the soundtrack's preference for "the most absurd squiggles, rubbery yanks, and rhythmic juxtapositions possible within the different patches of synth sound and editing capabilities." He described tracks 7–10–the longest on the album–as forming the "core" of the soundtrack, with metallic, droning keyboards and unabated beats. Track 9 features an ambient style with TB-303 "squirts basso," while track 10 features noises and processed vocals akin to early 808 State.

== Album release and reception ==
Professional ratings
Review scores
Source	Rating
AllMusic	2.5/5 stars
Pitchfork	7.6/10
Remix	4/5 stars
Uncut	3/5 stars

Despite never originally receiving its own release, the music in Eurotechno proved influential. The music's tendency to eradicate recognisable patterns after a brief appearance proved influential on later day producers such as Aphex Twin, Squarepusher and Bogdan Raczynski. For instance, track 9 has been cited as a predecessor to Aphex Twin's Selected Ambient Works Volume II. Aphex Twin's record label Rephlex was also influenced by the soundtrack, and agreed to re-release it after a period of unavailability. They remastered the music from the original tapes and, on 28 January 2003, released it for the first time on CD and vinyl. Rephlex soon followed it with a compilation of other Brian Dougan productions from the era, Sessions 84-88.

The Wire called Eurotechno "an orgiastic 25 minute sequence of build ups, breakdowns, 303s and four to the floor beats." They praised Rephlex for "rescuing this unique moment in the history of rave from its original fate." Vice wrote that Rephlex's reissue of the soundtrack was "[f]ar from an exercise in nostalgia," and instead "more like a labor of love." They referred to the soundtrack as an influential "acid lover's paradise" and wrote that, despite its short length, the album is "perfect for anyone looking to own a slice of dance-music history." Christine Hsieh of Remix wrote that Eurotechno "still sounds fresh, new and innovative." She commented that the release is "no nostalgic nod to the past," but instead "a testament to the timeless quality of solid electronic music."

In a positive review for Pitchfork, Andy Beta noted the influence of the music on contemporary producers, and wrote that: "Either as a history lesson through the classic Acid noises of a decade back, or as just a good ol' mix, Eurotechno is still quite quick and efficient work, even for a time machine." Ned Raggett of AllMusic noted that the release would appeal to dedicate fans of Dougans' later project The Future Sound of London. He wrote that while Eurotechno was "curious" and "very much of-its-time" in 1989, and had remained "not really all that deathless," it maintained a "certain thrill" and was "good enough fun." He felt parts of the music would anticipate Ibiza house. I. Khider of Exclaim! felt that, as an item of "audio anthropology," Eurotechno is "fun and interesting to listen to." Nonetheless, they wrote that the lack of "breadth" within the tracks meant that listeners would find it hard to engage with the music: "Just when the mind is about to wrap itself around a sumptuous rhythm or sound, a new track intrudes, resulting in a rather detached listening experience." Uncut referred to the soundtrack as "[h]istoric stuff" in a three-star review.

== Track listing ==
All music written by Brian Dougans, Mark McClean and Colin Scott

1. "Eurotechno (Part 1)" – 1:11
2. "Eurotechno (Part 2)" – 0:59
3. "Eurotechno (Part 3)" – 0:54
4. "Eurotechno (Part 4)" – 1:09
5. "Eurotechno (Part 5)" – 0:17
6. "Eurotechno (Part 6)" – 0:34
7. "Eurotechno (Part 7)" – 2:40
8. "Eurotechno (Part 8)" – 1:28
9. "Eurotechno (Part 9)" – 2:26
10. "Eurotechno (Part 10)" – 1:44
11. "Eurotechno (Part 11)" – 0:46
12. "Eurotechno (Part 12)" – 0:57
13. "Eurotechno (Part 13)" – 1:05
14. "Eurotechno (Part 14)" – 0:42
15. "Eurotechno (Part 15)" – 1:06
16. "Eurotechno (Part 16)" – 2:05
17. "Eurotechno (Part 17)" – 1:06
18. "Eurotechno (Part 18)" – 0:19
19. "Eurotechno (Part 19)" – 1:02
20. "Eurotechno (Part 20)" – 1:49
21. "Eurotechno (Part 21)" – 1:29

== Personnel ==
Adapted from the liner notes of Eurotechno

- Brian Dougans – Sounds
- Colin Scott – Sounds, final Audio Remix & Visuals
- Mark McClean – Sounds & Visuals
- Mark Pytel – Producer

== See also ==
- Rephlex Records discography
