= Environments 4 =

Studio album by The Future Sound of London
- Released: 30 April 2012
- Genre: IDM, ambient, experimental
- Length: 50:01
- Label: FSOLDigital, Jumpin' & Pumpin'
- Producer: The Future Sound of London

The Future Sound of London chronology
Environments 3 (2010)	Environments 4 (2012)	Environment Five (2014)

Environments 4 is the fourth in The Future Sound of London's "Environments" series of albums, released on 30 April 2012.

== Track listing ==
1. "The Wheel of Life" (3:57)
2. "No Man's Land" (1:15)
3. "River Delta" (4:09)
4. "Supercontinents" (2:01)
5. "Sediment" (2:52)
6. "Architektur" (5:12)
7. "Murmurations" (6:27)
8. "Sunsets" (3:30)
9. "Photosynthesis" (2:34)
10. "Stand a Little Less Between Me and the Sun" (1:42)
11. "Fibrillation" (5:43)
12. "Long Day" (2:41)
13. "Vast Landscape" (5:21)
14. "Clear Light of Reality" (2:37)
15. "Plough" (Bonus Track) (4:28)
