= Environments (album) =

Studio album by The Future Sound of London
- Released: 19 November 2007 Digital download (United Kingdom); 21 July 2008 CD (United Kingdom)
- Genre: Electronica; Ambient; Experimental
- Length: 49:10
- Label: FSOLdigital.com; EBV; Passion Records
- Producer: FSOL

The Future Sound of London chronology
Dead Cities (1996)	Environments (2007)	Environments II (2008)

Environments is the first part in a series of planned releases by The Future Sound of London over 2007/2008 via digital download and then CD.

== The album ==
Originally planned for release in 1994 under the Amorphous Androgynous alias, it was scrapped, despite being given a catalogue number for its US release and being announced in the liner notes of Lifeforms. Some of the material featured on live shows, the ISDN album, and the From The Archives series. In 2007, Brian Dougans reconstructed the album from archived material. Contained within the record are samples and elements from released tracks such as "Tired", "Wookii", "Cascade Part 1", "Life Form Ends" and "Ill Flower". Further Environments records - volumes II & III - are planned for digital release in 2008. A CD version of the album was released on Jumpin' & Pumpin' records on 21 July 2008, giving fans a chance to own an actual copy of the album fourteen years after its initial planned release. A further 180g vinyl reissue release of the album occurred 18 September 2015, this also included a limited number of signed copies.

== Track listing ==
1. Environments Part 1 (27:58)
2. Environments Part 2 (21:13)

== Crew ==
- Written, performed and produced by Brian Dougans and Garry Cobain
- Engineered by Yage
- Artwork by Buggy G. Riphead, EBV
