= Environment Five =

Studio album by The Future Sound of London
- Released: 8 September 2014
- Genre: Electronica, ambient, IDM
- Length: 52:54
- Label: FSOLDigital, Jumpin' & Pumpin'
- Producer: The Future Sound of London

The Future Sound of London chronology
Environments 4 (2012)	Environment Five (2014)

Environment Five is the fifth in The Future Sound of London's "Environments" series of albums, released on 8 September 2014 on CD, on vinyl and as a download. According to the band's website, the album features only new material.

== Track listing ==
1. "Point of Departure" (6:28)
2. "Source of Uncertainty" (1:53)
3. "Image of the Past" (4:29)
4. "Beings of Light" (2:54)
5. "In Solitude We Are Least Alone" (8:05)
6. "Viewed From Below The Surface" (3:14)
7. "Multiples" (1:10)
8. "Dying While Being Held" (2:53)
9. "Machines of the Subconscious" (2:56)
10. "Dark and Lonely Waters" (2:11)
11. "Somatosensory" (5:19)
12. "The Dust Settles" (4:16)
13. "Moments of Isolation" (7:00)

Pre-release and limited time post-release purchases came with a three-song digital download of tracks

1. "Electric Brain Storm" (3:40)
2. "The Final Inner Breath" (5:09)
3. "HereAfter" (6:11)
