= Slam (Humanoid song) =

Single by Humanoid

from the album Global
- B-side: "Bass Invaders"
- Released: 1989
- Recorded: Dance Music Studios, London
- Length: 17:03
- Label: Westside Records; 12" (WSRT14)/CD (CDWSR14)
- Songwriter: Brian Dougans

Humanoid singles chronology
"Stakker Humanoid" (1988)	"Slam" (1989)	"Tonight" (1989)

"Slam" was the second single released by Brian Dougans under his moniker "Humanoid", in 1989, and featured on the Global album. The track itself was the only other acid house single of the era, after Stakker Humanoid, with the following singles released from the album being more vocal led. The track itself features female and male vocals, the former sung and the latter in the form of an MC, distancing itself from the previous single. The single was released over three formats – CD, 7" and 12" – although the track list remained similar on each (with only the 7" omitting two mixes). The album version appeared as the Club Mix, while the Hip House mix featured more vocals, and Bass Invaders is largely a more instrumental version of the track.

== Track listing ==
1. Slam (Club mix) (6:34)
2. Slam (radio edit) (3:54)
3. Bass Invaders (3:21)
4. Slam (Hip House version) (3:54)

== Chart positions ==
Year	Chart	Position
1989	UK Singles Chart	#54

== Crew ==
- Composed and Produced by Brian Dougans
