= Tales of Ephidrina =

Studio album by Amorphous Androgynous
- Released: 5 July 1993
- Recorded: Analogue Room; Earthbeat Studios
- Genres: Electronica, ambient, techno, IDM
- Length: 47:02
- Label: Quigley Records

Amorphous Androgynous chronology
Tales of Ephidrina (1993)	The Isness (2002)

Professional ratings
Review scores
Source	Rating
Allmusic	4/5 stars

Tales of Ephidrina is an ambient/techno album by electronica duo Amorphous Androgynous, better known as The Future Sound of London (FSOL). It was released on 5 July 1993 through Quigley Records, a subsidiary label of Virgin. It was created from material the pair had been working on around the same time as their ambient FSOL title Lifeforms, while still containing some of the techno feel of Accelerator.

In 1996, Mixmag ranked the album at number 27 in its list of the "Best Dance Albums of All Time".

Tales of Ephidrina was remastered in 2023 and reissued as a 30th Anniversary Edition on both vinyl and CD for Record Store Day 2023. Both formats included four previously unreleased bonus tracks.

== History ==
This album was Amorphous Androgynous' first after signing with Virgin; they moved to London from Manchester and were given a free hand to do what they wanted. The album is unique, in that it is the only album they released in the 1990s that wasn't recorded at their Earthbeat studio, though it was later mixed there, and is also the only release on a short lived stem of Virgin Records, Quigley. It was the only electronic album recorded under the name Amorphous Androgynous, before the moniker's psychedelic reappearance in 2002.

The name Ephidrina refers to a form of Amphetamine.

== Track listing ==
=== Original issue ===
1. "Liquid Insects" – 7:21
2. "Swab" – 4:17
3. "Mountain Goat" – 4:38
4. "In Mind" – 5:38
5. "Ephidrena" – 8:17
6. "Auto Pimp" – 7:20
7. "Fat Cat" – 4:04
8. "Pod Room" – 5:27

=== 30th Anniversary Edition ===
1. "Liquid Insects" – 7:21
2. "Swab" – 4:17
3. "Mountain Goat" – 4:38
4. "In Mind" – 5:38
5. "Ephidrena" – 8:17
6. "Auto Pimp" – 7:20
7. "Fat Cat" – 4:04
8. "Pod Room" – 5:27
9. "Mountain Path" - 4:41
10. "Static Field" - 4:39
11. "Sky-Scraper Xtnd" - 6:59
12. "Swab Alt" - 4:15

== Personnel ==
- Written by Amorphous Androgynous
- Recorded at the Analogue Room - London
- Engineered by Yage
- Produced by Philip Pin
- Directed by FSOL
- Re-worked at Earthbeat Studios - London
- Cover art by Buggy G. Riphead
- "Liquid Insects" contains samples from the movie Predator, Phaedra by Tangerine Dream and Fire Cracker by 808 State, among others.
- "Fat Cat" contains a sample from Peter Gabriel's Passion, the soundtrack to the movieThe Last Temptation of Christ.

== Equipment ==
According to the album insert: EMS Synthi AKS, Jen SX 1000, ARP Synthesizer 2600, Roland SH101, Roland TB303, Roland TR606, Moog System 55, Bode Frequency Shifter 1630, 4 x Akai S1100 plus expanders (32mb), Digidesign Soundtools, Bode Ring Modulator, Trap Lunar Reflection II, Oberheim Matrix 1000, Trap Multi Effect Collector, OMM Space Enhancer
