= Accelerator (The Future Sound of London album) =

Studio album by the Future Sound of London
- Released: 5 April 1992
- Genre: Ambient techno
- Length: 52:20
- Label: Jumpin' & Pumpin'
- Producer: The Future Sound of London

The Future Sound of London chronology
Accelerator (1992)	Lifeforms (1994)

Accelerator is the debut studio album by the British electronic music group the Future Sound of London. It was released in April 1992 by the record label Jumpin' & Pumpin'. It includes the hit single "Papua New Guinea".

== Release ==
Accelerator was released in the United Kingdom in 1992 by Jumpin' & Pumpin'. Following the commercial success of the single "Papua New Guinea", the album was re-released a year later with two additional remixes. Due to record label difficulties, it could not be released in the United States until 1996, where it contained a further remix. It was re-released, enhanced, in 2001 worldwide, with a bonus CD entitled Papua New Guinea Remix Anthology, which contained both old and new remixes of "Papua New Guinea", several of which had already been released on previous singles by the group.

Accelerator marked the first time that The Future Sound of London worked with artist and frequent collaborator Buggy G. Riphead, who created the album's cover art.

== Reception ==
Professional ratings
Review scores
Source	Rating
AllMusic	3.5/5 stars
Q	4/5 stars

At the end of 1992, British music magazine Melody Maker included Accelerator at number 21 in its list of the year's best albums, while "Papua New Guinea" was included in the magazine's list of the year's best singles.

Reviewing the 1996 re-release, Option described Accelerator as "a weirdo futurist dreamland that's serene, exciting and even funny". Clash wrote that the album "pushed techno into new spheres of consciousness, one populated by pulsing rave waves, flickering ambient moods and giant dub squalls." Ned Raggett of AllMusic called it "the most explicitly commercial-minded the duo ever was, slotting in well with many other early-'90s U.K. dance/techno outfits. As such it's also arguably the least cryptic and most approachable release for newcomers, holding up well a decade after its original appearance."

== Track listing ==
All tracks are written by The Future Sound of London (Garry Cobain and Brian Dougans).

1992 release
No.	Title	Length
1.	"Expander"	5:40
2.	"Stolen Documents"	5:12
3.	"While Others Cry"	5:27
4.	"Calcium"	5:22
5.	"It's Not My Problem"	4:02
6.	"Papua New Guinea"	6:45
7.	"Moscow"	3:35
8.	"1 in 8"	4:36
9.	"Pulse State"	7:14
10.	"Central Industrial"	4:27
Total length:		52:20

1992 release bonus tracks
No.	Title	Length
11.	"Expander" (Remix)	4:51
12.	"Moscow" (Remix)	4:53

1996 release bonus tracks
No.	Title	Length
11.	"Expander" (Remix)	4:51
12.	"Moscow" (Remix)	4:53
13.	"Papua New Guinea" (Graham Massey Mix)	3:45

2001 release bonus disc (Papua New Guinea Mix Anthology)
No.	Title	Length
1.	"Papua New Guinea" (Blue States Full Length Mix)	5:46
2.	"Papua New Guinea" (Mellow Magic Maze Mix)	5:28
3.	"Papua New Guinea" (Simian Mix)	3:43
4.	"Papua New Guinea" (Oil Funk Dub Mix)	5:08
5.	"Papua New Guinea" (Dub Child of Q Mix)	4:22
6.	"Papua New Guinea" (Hybrid Full Length Mix)	8:31
7.	"Papua New Guinea" (Satoshi Tomiie Main-Path)	10:42
8.	"Papua New Guinea" (Monsoon Mix)	4:49
9.	"Papua New Guinea" (Andrew Weatherall Full Length Mix)	11:37
10.	"Papua New Guinea" (Dub Mix)	1:20

== Personnel ==
- The Future Sound of London – mixing, production, writing

Additional personnel

- Buggy G. Riphead – artwork and profile control
- Eunah Lee – graphic design (1996 release)

Notes

- The original 1992 release also included the following credits: production on "Expander" by Mental Cube, production on "Stolen Documents" by Luco, and writing on "Calcium" by Yage. These three credits were removed for the 2001 release, which simply states: "All titles written by Brian Dougans / Garry Cobain. Produced and mixed by The Future Sound of London."

== Charts ==
Chart (1994)	Peak position
UK Albums (OCC)	75
