= Environments II =

Studio album by The Future Sound of London
- Released: 29 August 2008 (United Kingdom)
- Genre: Electronic, IDM, ambient, experimental
- Length: 55:00
- Producer: FSOL

The Future Sound of London chronology
Environments (2007)	Environments II (2008)	Environments 3 (2010)

Environments II is the second release in The Future Sound of London's Environments series. It was released on 29 August 2008, and a CD version of the album was released on 5 January 2009.

== The album ==
Continuing from the first album in the series, part II is equally ambient (as opposed to the more breakbeat led material of their albums and archive series), but features strings, choir sounds and synthesizers, in contrast to the more abstract, sample-based nature of the first album. There are a few lo-fi type tracks with subtle beats, similar in sound to tracks from Aphex Twin's Selected Ambient Works series. The strings mentioned are Goldenthalian in sound and weave into the electronic ambience. The album features contributions by Max Richter, Daniel Pemberton, Chris Margory, Robert Fripp, Colin Bell and Will White.

== Track listing ==
1. "Viewed from Above" (2:33)
2. "Glacier (Part 1)" (8:55)
3. "Serengeti" (4:32)
4. "Colour-Blind" (3:35)
5. "A Corner" (3:29)
6. "Newfoundland" (2:04)
7. "North Arctic" (3:18)
8. "Factories and Assembly" (5:03)
9. "Ice Formed" (4:16)
10. "Small Town" (3:14)
11. "Nearly Home" (3:38)
12. "Boca Manu" (2:22)
13. "Journey to the Centre" (3:40)
14. "Glacier (Part 2)" (6:21)

== Crew ==
- Producer – Future Sound of London, The
- Written-By Brian Dougans, Garry Cobain
- Engineered by YAGE
