= The Peppermint Tree and Seeds of Superconsciousness =

The Peppermint Tree & the Seeds of Superconsciousness

Studio album by Amorphous Androgynous
- Released: 20 February 2008/Digital download June 2008/CD (United Kingdom)
- Genre: Electronica, ambient, progressive rock, experimental
- Length: 65:54
- Label: FSOLdigital.com(Feb); Jumpin' & Pumpin'(June)
- Producer: FSOL

Amorphous Androgynous chronology
Alice in Ultraland (2005)	The Peppermint Tree & the Seeds of Superconsciousness (2008)

The Future Sound of London chronology
FSOL Digital Mix (2007)	The Peppermint Tree and Seeds of Superconsciousness (2008)	The Woodlands of Old (2008)

Professional ratings
Review scores
Source	Rating
Allmusic	(?)

The Peppermint Tree & the Seeds of Superconsciousness is a 2008 album by the Amorphous Androgynous. It was released on the webpage of The Future Sound of London (FSOL) to buy as a digital download and was released on CD in June 2008.

Musically, it is in a similar vein to the two preceding Amorphous Androgynous albums, The Isness and Alice in Ultraland, with influences of psychedelia and progressive rock. However, it bears more in common with the latter's funk and blues experiments and ambient interludes between tracks.

It is described in the notes as "A collection of psychedelic relics from The Amorphous Androgynous, 1967-2007".

== Track listing ==
1. The Peppermint Tree (5:49)
2. Given That We've Given (3:05)
3. I Have Loved You into Oblivion (5:28)
4. Light Beyond Sound (1:57)
5. In Fear of the Electromagnetic Machine (Part 1) (1:54)
6. Somewhere at the Edge of Nowhere (1:01)
7. Riders (On The Circadian Rhythms) (4:14)
8. Carousel (0:38)
9. Yantra (3:54)
10. Opus of the Black Sun (6:29)
11. Marylebone Road (4:12)
12. Tiny Space Birds (5:02)
13. Drifter (3:33)
14. Rocket Fuel (4:41)
15. Listen Little Man (3:54)
16. Man Is A Virus in Shoes (2:35)
17. Mr. Sponge's Groovy Oscillations (3:12)
18. It's A Sunshine Day (Yeah! Yeah!) (4:25)
19. An Absurd Consequence of Living in Absurd Times (3:11)

== Crew ==
FSOL
