= Lifeforms (song) =

Single by The Future Sound of London

from the album Lifeforms
- Released: 1 August 1994
- Recorded: Earthbeat Studios, September Sound, London
- Genre: Ambient; Techno; IDM
- Length: 38:51
- Label: Astralwerks; Cat. VSCDT 1484, 7243 8 92373 2 0
- Songwriter(s): FSOL; Elizabeth Fraser
- Producer(s): FSOL

The Future Sound of London singles chronology
| "Cascade" (1993) | "Lifeforms" (1994) | "Expander" (1994) |

"Lifeforms" is a song by British electronic music duo The Future Sound of London, released as a single through Virgin Records on 1 August 1994. It is the second single from their 1994 album, Lifeforms. Vocals on the single were performed by Elizabeth Fraser of the Cocteau Twins.

The original version of "Lifeforms" from the album of the same name is present as "Path 3", while the album track "Life Form Ends" from the album can be heard in somewhat remixed form as "Path 5".

A 2:50 edit of "Path 4" was used as a radio edit and for the promotional video for the single. It is this version that appears on the commercial compilation album The Best... Album in the World...Ever! (vol 1).

In 1995, Fraser called the collaboration "disappointing". She said, "I sang my heart out for eleven fucking hours on that record and all that is on it is something that sounds like a sample. It was good, but it could have been brilliant." Brian Dougans, however, has given an alternate story, stating "If it sounds sampled it’s because that’s the way she compiled it. We were annoyed that we were restricted to the DAT provided [...] strict instruction was given not to deviate from what was given.”

An mp3 version of the single was premiered on 22 June 1994 on the New York–based internet bulletin board SonicNet. In 2014, after some verification, the single was given a Guinness World Record, certified as "the first internet music download".

== Track listing ==
1. "Lifeforms (Path 1)" (4:43)
2. "Lifeforms (Path 2)" (6:49)
3. "Lifeforms (Path 3)" (5:24)
4. "Lifeforms (Path 4)" (9:03)
5. "Lifeforms (Path 5)" (6:02)
6. "Lifeforms (Path 6)" (2:48)
7. "Lifeforms (Path 7)" (4:02)

== Charts ==
| Chart (1994) | Peak positions |
|---|---|
| Finland (IFPI) | 19 |
| UK Singles (OCC) | 14 |
| UK Dance (Music Week) | 12 |

== Crew ==
- Vocals by Elizabeth Fraser.
- Written by The Future Sound of London and Elizabeth Fraser.
- Tablatronics by Talvin Singh.
