= ISDN (album) =

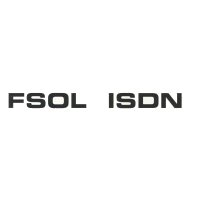
- Second edition cover

Live album by The Future Sound of London
- Released: 5 December 1994 (limited); 5 June 1995 (second)
- Recorded: Earthbeat Studios
- Genres: Ambient, techno, ambient dub, experimental
- Length: 74:57 (limited); 75:27 (second)
- Label: Virgin

The Future Sound of London chronology
Lifeforms (1994)	ISDN (1994)	Dead Cities (1996)

Professional ratings
Review scores
Source	Rating
AllMusic	4/5 stars
Almost Cool	(8.5/10)
Music Week	2/5 stars
Muzik	3/5 stars
NME	8/10 stars
Fluffhouse	7/10 stars

ISDN is an album by the electronic music duo the Future Sound of London (FSOL). It was released in two different versions in 1994 and 1995 through Virgin Records. The music is edited together from various live broadcasts that the band had transmitted to radio stations all over the world using an Integrated Services Digital Network (ISDN), a new technology at the time. Its first release in December 1994 entered the Chart Information Network's (CIN) Dance Albums Chart at no. 1. The band repeated the format in 1997 with the limited edition ISDN Show, another live album of ISDN broadcasts.

== The album ==
Stylistically, the record features some of the ambience of their previous work, but brings in elements of trip hop, acid jazz and Middle Eastern music.

The two released versions have different track listings and cover art. The limited edition, a 10,000-copy pressing released in December 1994, has a black cover. It entered the CIN's UK Dance Albums Chart at no. 1 on 17 December 1994.

The later release, which first appeared in June 1995, has a white cover with black writing, and a different track listing.

=== Samples ===
The album contains references to several films; Repo Man in "Eyes Pop - Skin Explodes - Everybody Dead" is a line spoken by the character J. Frank Parnell. "It's My Mind That Works" samples Miller saying "you know the way everybody's into weirdness right now?" and "it's all part of a cosmic unconsciousness." (Note: Miller: A lot o' people don't realize what's really going on. They view life as a bunch of unconnected incidents and things. They don't realize that there's this, like, lattice of coincidence that lays on top of everything. Give you an example; show you what I mean: suppose you're thinking about a plate of shrimp. Suddenly someone'll say, like, plate, or shrimp, or plate of shrimp out of the blue, no explanation. No point in looking for one, either. It's all part of a cosmic unconsciousness. Otto: You eat a lot of acid, Miller, back in the hippie days? Miller: I'll give you another instance: you know how everybody's into weirdness right now?... written by: Alexander B. H. Cox) There are also samples from the sci-fi epic movie Aliens in the track "Far Out Son Of Lung And The Ramblings Of A Madman", (Note: "Alright let's see what we can see everyone online looking good" screenplay by: James Cameron film was based on characters by: Dan O'Bannon & Ronald Shusett) along with robotic sounds and laser-fire from the film The Black Hole in the track "Just a Fuckin Idiot", and samples from films Escape from New York, Predator and Exorcist II: The Heretic (Note: Dirty Shadows: Regan MacNeil: You want me to take you to him? Father Lamont: Yes. Regan MacNeil: Come. Fly the teeth of the wind. Share my wings. written by William Malcolm Goodhart (1925, New Haven, Connecticut -1999, Shelter Island, New York)) scattered throughout the record.

== Track listing ==
=== Limited edition ===
1. "Just a Fuckin Idiot" – 5:39
2. "The Far out Son of Lung and the Ramblings of a Madman" – 4:29
3. "Appendage" – 2:26
4. "Slider" – 7:22
5. "Smokin Japanese Babe" – 4:59
6. "You're Creeping Me Out" – 6:32
7. "Eyes Pop - Skin Explodes - Everybody Dead" – 3:45
8. "It's My Mind That Works" – 3:25
9. "Dirty Shadows" – 6:15
10. "Tired" – 6:32
11. "Egypt" – 4:11
12. "Are They Fightin Us" – 6:23
13. "Hot Knives" – 3:20
14. "A Study of Six Guitars" – 4:13
15. "An End of Sorts" – 5:26

=== Second edition ===
1. "Just a Fuckin Idiot" – 5:39
2. "The Far out Son of Lung and the Ramblings of a Madman" – 4:29
3. "Appendage" – 2:26
4. "Slider" – 7:22
5. "Smokin Japanese Babe" – 4:59
6. "You're Creeping Me Out" – 6:32
7. "Eyes Pop - Skin Explodes - Everybody Dead" – 3:45
8. "It's My Mind That Works" – 3:25
9. "Dirty Shadows" – 6:15
10. "Tired" – 6:32
11. "Egypt" – 4:11
12. "Kai" – 4:24
13. "Amoeba" – 5:21
14. "A Study of Six Guitars" – 4:13
15. "Snake Hips" – 5:52

=== Vinyl edition ===
1. "Just a Fuckin Idiot" – 5:39
2. "The Far out Son of Lung and the Ramblings of a Madman" – 4:29
3. "Appendage" – 2:26
4. "Slider" – 7:22
5. "Smokin Japanese Babe" – 4:59
6. "You're Creeping Me Out" – 6:32
7. "Eyes Pop - Skin Explodes - Everybody Dead" – 3:45
8. "It's My Mind That Works" – 3:25
9. "Dirty Shadows" – 6:15
10. "Tired" – 6:32
11. "Egypt" – 4:11
12. "Are They Fightin Us" – 6:23
13. "Kai" – 4:24
14. "Amoeba" – 5:21
15. "A Study of Six Guitars" – 4:13
16. "Snake Hips" – 5:52

== Personnel ==
- Written and produced by The Future Sound of London
- Engineered by Yage for EBV
- Recorded live at Earthbeat Studios, London 1995, during various ISDN transmissions
- Guitar on "Dirty Shadows" was sourced from Robert Fripp live with FSOL, Radio 1 FM, on 14 May 1994.
- John Williams - acoustic bass loops was sourced from the album Cavatina - put through the machines on "Smokin' Japanese Babe" & "Are They Fightin Us".
- "Snake Hips" contains a horn sample from "Vegas El Bandito" and additional percussion loop from "Kundalini" by 23 Skidoo.
- "Slider" and "Kai" contain samples from "The Waiting Room" by Genesis (from the album The Lamb Lies Down on Broadway).

== Charts ==
Chart (1994)	Peak position
CIN Dance Albums Chart (CIN)	1
