= My Kingdom (song) =

Single by The Future Sound of London

from the album Dead Cities
- Released: 14 October 1996
- Recorded: Earthbeat Studios, London
- Genre: Ambient; Techno; IDM
- Length: 30:22
- Label: Astralwerks; Virgin; Cat. VSCDT 1605, 7243 8 93817 2 6
- Songwriter: FSOL
- Producer: FSOL

The Future Sound of London singles chronology
| "The Far-Out Son of Lung and the Ramblings of a Madman" (1995) | "My Kingdom" (1996) | "We Have Explosive" (1997) |

"My Kingdom" is the first single from Future Sound of London's 1996 release Dead Cities. It is written in a theme and variation format on the song "My Kingdom", but Part 4 returns to the original theme. Part 5 is the radio edit.

== Track listing ==
1. "My Kingdom: Part 1" (10:50)
2. "My Kingdom: Part 2" (03:15) (Leon Mar reconstruct)
3. "My Kingdom: Part 3" (07:11)
4. "My Kingdom: Part 4" (05:12)
5. "My Kingdom: Part 5" (03:54)

== Crew & Notes ==
- The guitar sample is by Ozric Tentacles, from the song "Phalarn Dawn" on their album, "Pungent Effulgent"
- The pan flute sample (performed by Gheorghe Zamfir), is from "Cockeye's Song" and "Childhood Memories", on the soundtrack to Once Upon a Time in America by Ennio Morricone, although it is only credited on the sleeve as being from "Once Upon a Time in America".
- The vocal sample is by Mary Hopkin, from "Rachel's Song", on the Blade Runner soundtrack by Vangelis
- "My Kingdom: Part 3" starts with the voice sample from "Everyone in the World is Doing Something Without Me" also from Dead Cities.
- Engineer – Yage
- Producer – Future Sound of London, The
- Written By Dougans, Cobain
- Ralph Ineson appears in the video.

== Chart position ==
| Year | Chart | Position |
|---|---|---|
| 1996 | UK Singles Chart | #13 |
