= Papua New Guinea (instrumental) =

1991 single by the Future Sound of London

Single by the Future Sound of London

from the album Accelerator
- Released: November 1991
- Recorded: 1991
- Studio: Earthbeat Studios
- Genre: Chill-out
- Label: Jumpin' & Pumpin'
- Songwriters: Garry Cobain; Brian Dougans
- Producer: Yage

"Papua New Guinea" is a single by the British electronic music group the Future Sound of London. It was released in November 1991 through the label Jumpin' & Pumpin' and is included on the group's debut album, Accelerator, released the following year. The single entered the CIN's Dance Singles Chart at No. 42 in December 1991, and reached number 22 on the UK Singles Chart when rereleased in mid-1992.

== Development ==
=== Background ===
Garry Cobain described himself as being "bit of an indie kid" in the mid 1980s, being a fan of the Manchester-based Factory Records acts such as Joy Division. Cobain reflected in 2006 that he had played guitar but was "never very good, and I'm still not very good at it."

This led Cobain going to the University of Manchester Institute of Science and Technology. At the school he met Brian Dougans who was studying sound recording and was also a fan of Factory Records bands like A Certain Ratio. Cobain described Dougans as "I was well envious of Brian, and he was also a couple of years older, which seemed to be very significant when I was in my late teens. He was very much a guiding force, and he was also extremely charismatic." Dougans was producing music for bands but after dance music became popular in the United Kingdom he began working on tracks like "Stakker Humanoid". Cobain stated that he managed to get money working at Heathrow Airport, through his landlord and through the Enterprise Allowance Scheme leading him to develop his own music, and that after Dougans "ran into some trouble", they teamed up to become the group that would develop into Future Sound of London.

=== Development ===
The duo released several tracks under aliases, some of which Cobain felt in retrospect were "admittedly dodgy—but we were always looking for the opportunity to start getting weirder, and gradually we found it." Cobain recalled that the music industry at the time was very aimed towards dance singles at the time, while Dougans and Cobain wanted to make what Cobain described as "big, sprawling, cosmic, ambient rock albums—in other words, concept albums—which would be easy for us."

Accelerator was developed at Future Sound of London's studio called Earthbeat which was located in Dollis Hill in Northwest London. The engineer credited on the "Papua New Guinea" was YAGE, who Cobain described as "semi-fictitious and semi-real" and admitting that it was "kind of an alter-ego for the both of us". The name was derived from Yajé, a vision-inducing drink that is made from a psychoactive jungle vine and plants. Cobain described the development of "Papua New Guinea" as him writing, sequencing and playing the Roland JX-3P top-line synth parts live, and doing the same for the strings which were triggered from the 1040.

== Music ==
"Papua New Guinea"
Sample of "Papua New Guinea" from the album Papua New Guinea.

The song samples the bass line from Meat Beat Manifesto's "Radio Babylon" with Lisa Gerrard's vocal from "Dawn of the Iconoclast" by Dead Can Dance. Cobain described the sampling choices stating that the "Radio Babylon" bass line was "one of the greatest within the culture" while the bass line in "Papua New Guinea" was "kind of a staccato sampled version." The Dead Can Dance sample came from a mixtape sent to a band members' girlfriends collection which she received from a man she had been seeing briefly. Cobain stated that he had "always loved Dead Can Dance but I didn't have that particular album, so I sampled it from the cassette."

== Release ==
"Papua New Guinea" was released in the United Kingdom in November 1991. The record entered the CIN's Dance Singles Chart at No. 42 on 7 December 1991, and reached number 22 on the UK Singles Chart when released in mid-1992. The label that was to release their debut album Accelerator held off releasing it for about nine months and only released it after "Papua New Guinea" became a hit.

The song later featured on the soundtrack album for the hybrid animation film Cool World starring Gabriel Byrne, Kim Basinger and Brad Pitt.

== Reception ==
Garry Cobain later referred to the track as not "the best piece of music I've ever written, but it just hit a mindset". From retrospective reviews and commentary, Simon Reynolds described the track as a "sumptuous, gorgeously emotional rave anthem". Pitchfork had the song placed on their list of the top 200 singles from the 1990s, with writer Tom Ewing declaring it "A great example of breakbeat techno's early, optimistic peak, when simply nailing the right vocal sample—here Lisa Gerrard of Dead Can Dance—put you halfway to something memorable." In 2025, Billboard magazine ranked "Papua New Guinea" number 95 in their list of "The 100 Best Dance Songs of All Time".

== Charts ==
=== Weekly charts ===
Year	Chart	Peak position
1991	UK Dance Singles (Music Week)	42
1992	UK Singles (OCC)	22
1992	UK Dance Singles (Music Week)	1
1992	UK Club Chart (Music Week)	4
2001	UK Singles (OCC)	28

=== Year-end charts ===
Year	Chart	Position
1992	UK Club Chart (Music Week)	93

== Certifications ==
Region	Certification	Certified units/sales
United Kingdom (BPI)	Silver	200,000^{‡}
^{‡} Sales+streaming figures based on certification alone.
