= Stakker Humanoid =

Single by Humanoid

from the album Global
- B-side: "Stakker Humanoid (The Omen Mix)"
- Released: 1988, 1992, 2001, 2007
- Recorded: Dance Studios, Ealing London
- Genre: Acid house
- Label: Westside Records; Rephlex
- Songwriter: Brian Dougans
- Producers: Brian Dougans; John Laker

Humanoid singles chronology
"-" (-)	"Stakker Humanoid" (1988)	"Slam" (1989)

"Stakker Humanoid" is a 1988 track by Humanoid (Brian Dougans, John Laker) released in 1988 on the London-based label Westside Records. It is described by The Guardian as "the first truly credible UK acid techno record to break into the mainstream."

== History ==
The project behind the track started out with Stakker, a collaborative project by the video artists Mark McLean and Colin Scott. They needed music to support their video and contacted Brian Dougans. They sent a demo video tape containing graphics and some music to Morgan Khan who (although he didn't appreciate the video) invited Brian Dougans to record two demos at his Dance Studios in Ealing London. The sample "Humanoid", taken from the video game Berzerk, provided the name of the track.

The track was originally called "Humanoid" to be put out by Stakker through Morgan Khan's label Westside Records, though Morgan released it as "Stakker Humanoid" by 'Humanoid' to avoid copyright issues. As Dougans has acknowledged in interviews, John Laker helped co-produce and engineer the song but did not write it, since the session was based on Dougans' initial tapes and explorations for what would become the soundtrack basis to Stakker's influential Eurotechno film.

Because of a difference in direction between Brian Dougans and Colin Scott / Mark McLean, before the record was in the shops -- in terms of Stakker's aspirations as a video-first project versus an outfit with a strong audio and music component as part of its ongoing core team -- Stakker and Brian Dougans split, ending their partnership, which had lasted just over a year. However, McLean and Dougans would continue working together on several Future Sound of London projects.

The track was a hit not just at influential clubs like Shoom in London, but was championed by mainstream stalwarts like radio DJ Bruno Brookes and producer Pete Waterman. It went on to reach number 17 on the UK charts in November 1988, leading to Dougans' appearance on Top of the Pops on 1 December 1988. In 2011, Noel Gallagher said of the track:

"What a fucking tune 'Stakker Humanoid' is! I didn't realise it was them (Future Sound of London) until we were about halfway through recording. Someone mentioned that track halfway through recording [his collaborative album with Amorphous Androgynous] and I was like, 'You're fucking joking … shut up … get the fuck out of here!' I had to stop and give them a hug. I used to love that tune!"

== Mixes ==
The soundtrack for the 1989 release Eurotechno (originally written by Dougans) was remixed and overdubbed with new sections added by Colin Scott and Simon Monday in the digital studio that Scott and McLean had set up in the Goldcrest building in Great Pultney Street in Soho. This soundtrack is on the Eurotechno video and on the CD later released by Rephlex Records.

More remixes appeared on the 2007 album Your Body Sub-Atomic by Humanoid.

== Track listings ==
=== Original 12" and CD release ===
1. A1 - "Stakker Humanoid" (4:59)
2. A2 - "Stakker Humanoid" (Radio Edit) (3:40)
3. B - "Stakker Humanoid" (The Omen Mix) (7:50)

=== Original 7" release ===
1. A - "Stakker Humanoid" (3:40)
2. B - "Stakker Humanoid" (Part 2) (4:40)

=== Stakker Humanoid '92 ===
1. "Stakker Humanoid" (7" Original) (3:40)
2. "Stakker Humanoid" (Smart Systems Remix) (4:52)
  - Remix - Smart Systems
3. "Stakker Humanoid" (Gary Cobain '94 Mix) (5:41)
  - Remix - Garry Cobain
4. "Stakker Humanoid" (Omen Mix) (7:36)
5. "Stakker Humanoid" (303 Tribe) (5:31)
  - Remix - The Future Sound of London
6. "Stakker Humanoid" (Outer Limits) (4:51)
  - Remix - The Future Sound of London
7. "Stakker Humanoid" (12" Original) (4:55)
8. "Stakker Humanoid" (Dub Drums) (2:43)
  - Remix - The Future Sound of London

== Chart positions ==
Year	Single	Chart	Position
1988	"Stakker Humanoid"	UK Singles Chart	#17
1988	"Stakker Humanoid"	UK Dance Chart	#1
1992	"Stakker Humanoid '92"	UK Singles Chart	#40
2001	"Stakker Humanoid 2001"	UK Singles Chart	#65

== Personnel ==
- Composed by Brian Dougans
- Engineered by John Laker
- Produced and mixed by Brian Dougans, John Laker
- Uses vocal samples from the videogame 'Berzerk'.
