= Garry Cobain =

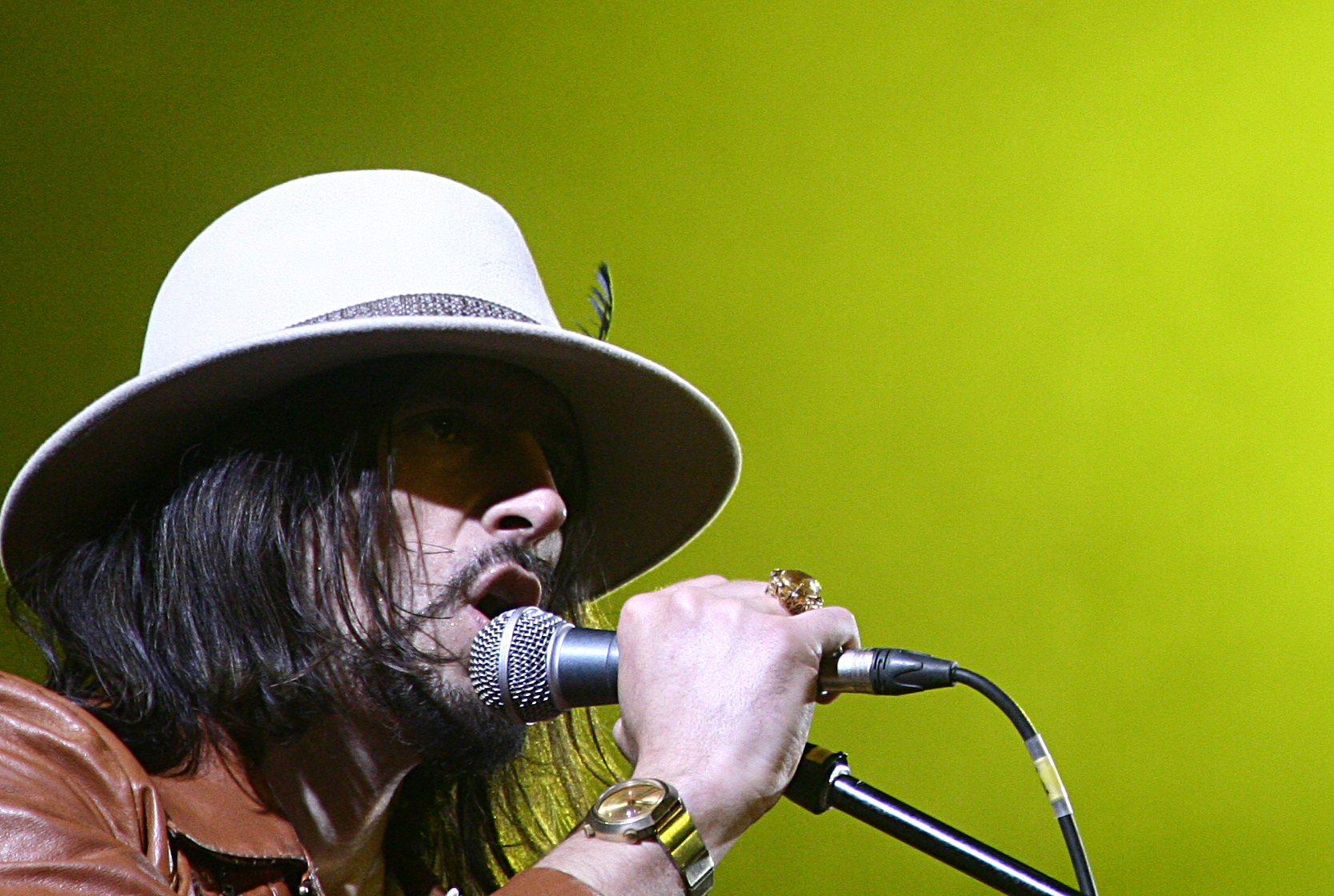
- Cobain at the 2009 Gogolfest in Kyiv, Ukraine

Background information
- Also known as: See here.
- Born: Garry John Cobain; 16 May 1967 (age 59); Bedford, England
- Genres: Electronica; psychedelia
- Occupations: Musician; composer; producer; singer; DJ
- Instruments: Keyboards, synthesizer, sampler, music technology, guitar, bass, sitar, drums
- Years active: 1988–present
- Labels: Jumpin' & Pumpin'; Virgin
- Member of: The Future Sound of London
- Website: futuresoundoflondon.com

Garry John Cobain (sometimes styled as Gaz Cobain) (born 16 May 1967) is an English electronic musician and composer who forms one half of the Future Sound of London.

== Background ==
Cobain was born on 16 May 1967 in Bedford. He left Bedford for Manchester in his late teens to study at a time when alternative music in that part of Britain was taking off; the dance music scene in particular was becoming more and more popular, not just in Manchester but all over the country and in the States too. Cobain, drawn to the city by bands like the Chameleons and the Smiths, embraced this atmosphere and joined a band he had seen rehearsing in a studio and stayed with them for a year; after his spell with that band he met Brian Dougans.

== Music ==
After meeting Dougans, Cobain and Dougans both started discussing their shared interest in electronic music and began to work together on small projects; Cobain then left the college to build his own studio on an Enterprise Allowance Scheme Course and he and Dougans began to release tracks under aliases such as Mental Cube and Art Science Technology, some of these early singles would be compiled onto Earthbeat (1992).

Cobain first big collaboration with Dougans was on "Stakker Humanoid", which went on to be a chart hit at a time when acid house in particular was becoming popular. The pair then released their first single as The Future Sound of London (FSOL) "Papua New Guinea" which also became a hit in clubs across Britain and the States. They signed with Virgin Records but remained independent artistically, something they have always fought for and achieved; Cobain puts this down to them already having a few hits under their belts ("Papua New Guinea" in particular) before they signed with the major label.

Cobain has always been the more vocal member of the band and always speaks for them in interviews with Dougans sometimes interjecting on a certain point; Cobain has said that FSOL is a combination of opposites, the roles of masculine and feminine are central to the FSOL ethos and Cobain has said that in the band he represents the melody and softness as opposed to Dougans representing technology, machines and programming; it is the marriage of these forces, Cobain says, that makes FSOL work the way it does, especially with the Amorphous Androgynous of the new millennium where progressive rock and psychedelica were embraced. The new incarnation of Amorphous Androgynous is very much Cobain's new vehicle for the expression of his energy whilst still releasing their more electronic-based music as FSOL.

Cobain has stated that he is influenced philosophically by Laozi, Buddha and Jiddu Krishnamurti, and that he likes the bands Secret Chiefs 3, Mercury Rev and Simian among many others.
