= Brian Dougans =

British musician

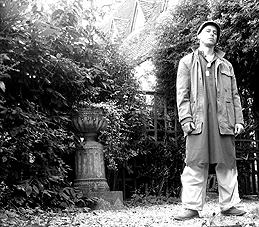

Background information
- Born: Brian Robert Dougans; 1965 (age 60–61); Glasgow, Scotland
- Genres: Electronic, IDM, ambient, techno, experimental
- Occupations: Musician, composer, producer
- Instruments: Keyboards, sampler, synthesizer, drums, laptop, computer, music technology
- Years active: 1984–present
- Labels: Jumpin' & Pumpin', Virgin, Rephlex
- Website: futuresoundoflondon.com

Brian Robert Dougans (born 1965) is a Scottish musician and composer who is a member of the British electronic duo the Future Sound of London (FSOL).

Dougans is the more technical member of FSOL, doing most of the programming, circuit bending et cetera and creating electronic instruments at his home studio in Glastonbury, Somerset. He is currently head of FSOLdigital (FSOL's record label) and co designer of the FSOL:Digitana SX-1 Synthesiser.

Dougans' first releases were as "Humanoid", releasing the acid house single "Stakker Humanoid", which reached number 17 in the UK singles chart in 1988, and also charted in 1992 and 2001. "Stakker Humanoid" was No.1 for five weeks in the UK Dance Chart (December 1988) and has been cited as a major influence on early Aphex Twin releases. Dougans' music as Humanoid is also part of the MOMA NY collection via Stakker Eurotechno. Dougans has always been the quiet, technical workhorse of FSOL whilst Garry Cobain brings in his melody and softness to balance Dougans' technical wizardry.

== Music ==
=== Humanoid ===
Dougans first releases were as "Humanoid", releasing the acid house single "Stakker Humanoid". The track was a hit not just at influential clubs like Shoom in London, but was championed by mainstream stalwarts like Radio DJ Bruno Brookes and Kylie and Jason producer Pete Waterman. After the single reached No. 17 in the UK singles chart in November 1988, leading to Dougans' appearance on Top of the Pops on 1 December 1988. Subsequent re-issues also charted in 1992 and 2001.

Stakker Humanoid was No.1 for five weeks in the UK Dance Chart (December 1988) and has been cited as a major influence on early Aphex Twin releases. Dougans music as Humanoid is also part of the MOMA NY collection via Stakker Eurotechno.

Stakker was also used as the name of the collaboration between Dougans and video artists Colin Scott and Mark McLean. Eurotechno, the soundtrack to a visual installation by the group, was originally released in 1989.

=== Future Sound of London ===
Dougans met Garry Cobain in 1985 when he was at Salford College of Technology in Manchester studying Music Recording Technology. After Dougans left college he set up his own studio in London where Cobain joined him and they began to release a plethora of singles under various aliases, some of which would end up on their first compilation album (as FSOL) Earthbeat in 1992.

Whereas the sound of Amorphous Androgynous is Cobain's vehicle, FSOL's more "mechanical" sound is Dougan's.

== Synthesizers ==
Dougans has co-designed two synthesizers with English electronics company Digitana; the SX-1 analogue synthesizer and the Halia (stand alone digital sampler synth). The SX-1 has been received with critical acclaim and has been used in Spider-Man: Into the Spider-Verse, The Innocents and One Strange Rock.

== Guinness World Records ==
Dougans received (along with his musical partner Cobain) one retrospective award from the Guinness World Records as the first internet music download on 22 June 1994, distributed via the New York-based internet bulletin board Sonicnet.

== Discography ==
All as Humanoid unless indicated (please see also The Future Sound of London).

=== Albums ===
| Release Date | Title | Label | Notes |
|---|---|---|---|
| 27 January 2003 | Eurotechno | Rephlex; CAT129CD | With the group Stakker, an early project, released on Aphex Twin's label Rephlex, a soundtrack of sorts to a visual installation artist Mark McLean both of which was a major inspiration to the Rephlex collective and as such was re-released on the label in 2003. |
| 19 November 2007 | Your Body Sub-Atomic | FSOLDigital.com; Digital download | As Humanoid, 20th anniversary remix album of the Stakker Humanoid release and other tracks by Brian Dougans; the remixes are by both new and established artist's and DJ's, download also included an Adobe Flash "booklet" and high quality video of the "Feadz 2007 Mix". |
| 19 March 2007 | 4 Forests | FSOLDigital.com; Digital download | As Part-Sub-Merged, an experimental project released on FSOL's website; a dark soundtrack to a short film by him under the same alias. |
| 6 July 2023 | Sweet Acid Sound | CD TOT 88 | Released initially on bandcamp. |

=== Compilation albums ===
| Release Date | Title | Label | Notes |
|---|---|---|---|
| 1989 | Global | Westside Records; CDHUM 1989 | Early compilation of the singles he released in 88/89. |
| 10 February 2003 | Sessions 84-88 | Rephlex; CAT130CD | An experimental compilation full of acid house tracks and a remix of Stakker Humanoid. |
| 1 March 2007 | Zeebox 1984-1987 Vol. 1 | FSOLDigital.com; Digital download | As Zeebox; the first part of a digital download compilation set of Zeebox albums, experiments from his time in Glasgow and Manchester. |
| 4 March 2007 | Zeebox 1984-1987 Vol. 2 | FSOLDigital.com; Digital download | As Zeebox; the second part of a digital download compilation set of Zeebox albums, experiments from his time in Glasgow and Manchester. |

=== EPs ===
| Release Date | Title | Label | Notes |
|---|---|---|---|
| 1992 | Braindamage | Bit Bites Brain; BIT 9215-12 | A release on a small German indie label featuring b-sides by another artist called Phase IV. |

=== Singles ===
| Release Date | Title | Label | Notes |
|---|---|---|---|
| 1988 | "Stakker Humanoid" | Westside Records; WSRT 12 | As Humanoid, first single, hit No. 17 in the UK singles chart, No. 1 in the UK dance chart for five weeks |
| 1989 | "Slam" | Westside Records; CDWSR14 | As Humanoid, featured on "Global" compilation. |
| 1989 | "The Deep" | Westside Records; HUMT2 | As Humanoid, featured on "Global" compilation. |
| 1989 | "Tonight" | Westside Records; HUMT1 | As Humanoid, featured on "Global" compilation. |
| 1989 | "Crystals (Back Together)" | Chicago Trax; PROMO HUMT3 | As Humanoid, featured on "Global" compilation. |
| 1989 | "R.A.V.E" | Dangerous; M-4001 | As Humanoid, released on the obscure American Dangerous Records. |

== See also ==
- Rephlex Records discography
