= The Future Sound of London =

British electronic group

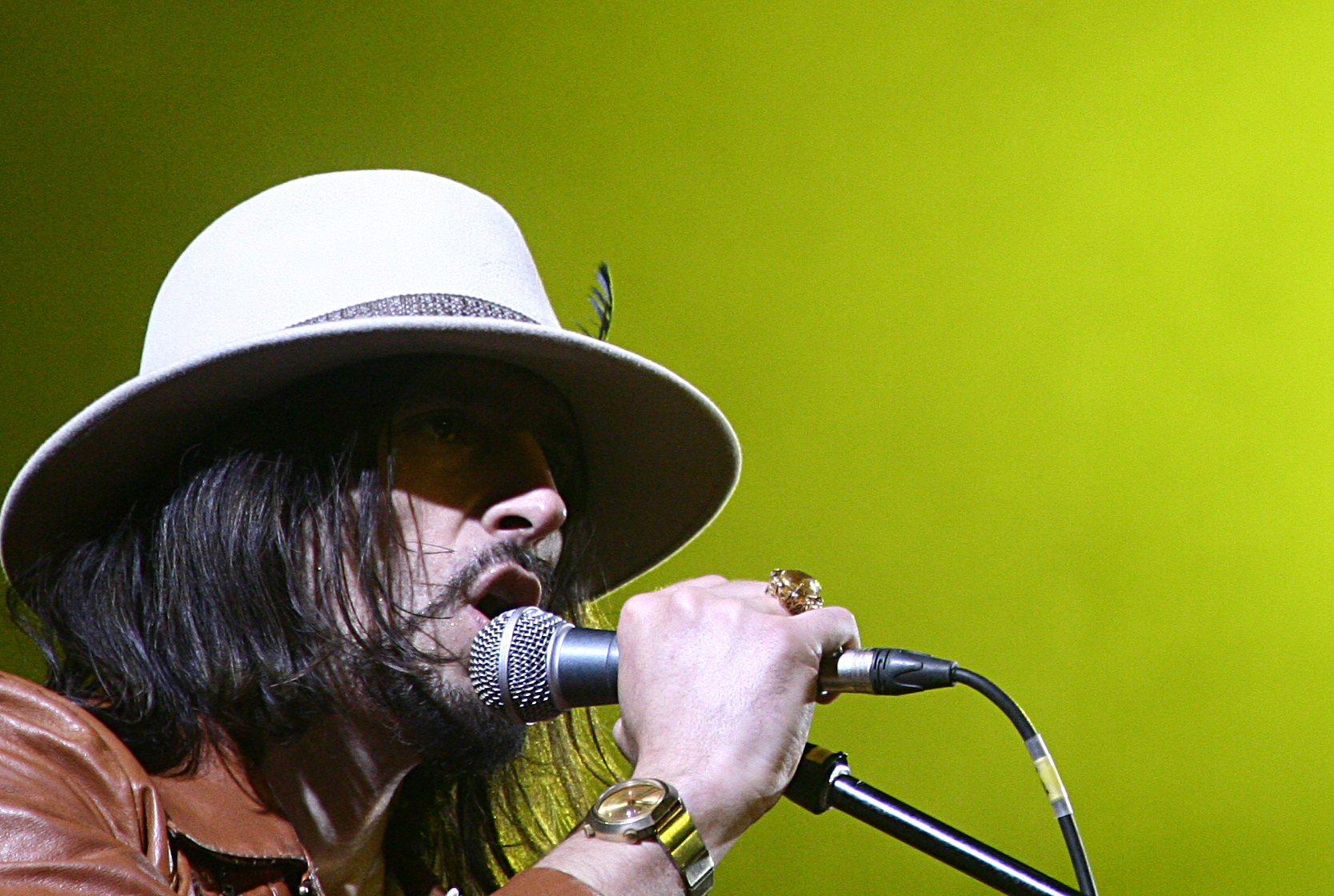
- Garry Cobain at the 2009 Gogolfest in Kyiv, Ukraine

Background information
- Also known as: Amorphous Androgynous; Blackhill Transmitter; Synthi-A; Yage
- Origin: Manchester, England
- Genres: Electronic; IDM; techno; ambient; psychedelia; experimental
- Years active: 1988–present
- Labels: Jumpin' & Pumpin', Astralwerks, Rephlex, Virgin, Quigley, Hypnotic, Future Sound of London Recordings, FSOLDigital, Electronic Brain Violence
- Members: Garry Cobain; Brian Dougans
- Website: futuresoundoflondon.com

The Future Sound of London (often abbreviated FSOL) is a British electronic music duo composed of Garry Cobain and Brian Dougans. They have been described as a "boundary-pushing" electronic act, covering techno, ambient, house music, trip hop, psychedelia, and dub.

While keeping an enigmatic image and releasing music under many aliases, the band found commercial success with singles "Papua New Guinea" (1991) and "Cascade" (1993), and albums Lifeforms (1994), ISDN (1995) and Dead Cities (1996). In recent years, the duo has become more candid with their fanbase online. Their later work include their series of experimental Environments and Archives albums.

== History ==
=== Formation ===
Garry Cobain and Brian Dougans met in the mid-1980s while studying electronics at university in Manchester. Dougans had already been making electronic music, working between Glasgow and Manchester, when the pair first began working together in local clubs. In 1988, Dougans embarked on a project for a graphic studio Stakker, which resulted in a single "Stakker Humanoid" that reached number 17 in the UK charts, introducing acid house to mainstream audience. Cobain contributed to the accompanying album Global. In the following years the pair produced music under a variety of aliases, releasing a number of singles and EPs, including "Q" and "Metropolis", later featured on the 1992 compilation Earthbeat. They were initially signed to the British sub-label of Passion Music, Jumpin' & Pumpin'.

In 1991, Cobain and Dougans released their breakthrough single, "Papua New Guinea" on Jumpin' & Pumpin'. The song was based upon a sample from "Dawn of the Iconoclast" by Dead Can Dance and a bassline from "Radio Babylon" by Meat Beat Manifesto. It enjoyed great success, charting for seven weeks and peaking at number 22 in 1992. The single was followed by their debut album, Accelerator, which included "Papua New Guinea" among other new tracks. After a few other releases on Jumpin' & Pumpin', they were signed by Virgin Records, with the free rein to experiment.

In 1993, the duo released an ambient album Tales of Ephidrina, the first under the alias Amorphous Androgynous. The focus on texture and mood, while retaining dance beats, was well received. The album was released on Quigley, the band's own short-lived offshoot of Virgin. The band begun experimenting with radio performance, broadcasting three-hour radio shows to Manchester's Kiss FM from their studio.

=== Lifeforms and the ISDN tour ===
In 1993, the band released "Cascade," a nearly 40 minutes single which made the UK top 30. It was followed in 1994 by the album Lifeforms, released to critical acclaim and a top 10 hit on the UK album chart. The eponymous single featured Elizabeth Fraser of the Cocteau Twins on vocals. The record introduced an array of exotic, tropical sound samples. Dougans' father's involvement in the BBC Radiophonic Workshop had a heavy influence on Lifeforms. Often asked whether Brian Eno was an influence, Cobain and Dougans said they were about looking to the future not the past. To them, Lifeforms was a new work, not just another Eno-type ambient album.

That year, the Future Sound of London released a limited-edition album ISDN, which featured live broadcasts made over ISDN lines to various radio stations worldwide to promote Lifeforms, including The Kitchen, an avant-garde performance space in New York, and several appearances on BBC Sessions hosted by John Peel. The shows featured ambient soundscapes with previously released material performed alongside unheard tracks. One performance for BBC Radio 1 featured Robert Fripp. The tone of ISDN was darker and more rhythmic than Lifeforms. The band wanted to achieve something epic and grand, but no matter how much technological or personal support they had they never got to truly do what they envisioned. Cobain said that the 90s were a time of frustration because the technology didn't fit the band's ideas. In 1995, the album was re-released with expanded artwork and a slightly altered track list.

The band's interests have covered different areas including film and video, 2D and 3D computer graphics, animation in making almost all their own videos for their singles, radio broadcasting and creating electronic devices for sound making.

=== Dead Cities ===
"Landmass" (1995)
Sample of "Landmass", which was featured in the game WipEout 2097.

The 1995 edition of John Peel Sessions featured new tracks which moved away from breakbeat and the free sampling of ISDN. In 1996, the band released Dead Cities which expanded upon these early demos, in a mix of ambient textures and dance music. The new sound was introduced in the lead single "My Kingdom." The album featured the first collaboration with composer Max Richter, including on a 1997 big beat single "We Have Explosive" that featured manipulated samples of Run DMC. The track was used on popular soundtracks to Mortal Kombat Annihilation, and the video game WipE'out" 2097, the latter also including a new track "Landmass." "We Have Explosive" was the band's highest-charting single, and over the course of its five-part extended version included hints of funk.

The album was promoted by what the band described as "the fuck rock'n'roll tour" via ISDN, gaining attention as the first world tour without leaving a studio. While the 1994 tour focused on creating soundscapes and unreleased material, the 1996 and 1997 shows were more conventional, each offering a different take on music featured on Dead Cities, blending current with occasional unreleased tracks. The final performances included considerable use of live guitar and percussion. These sessions were the basis of the band's later psychedelic projects of the following decade, while others appeared on the subsequent album series From The Archives.

=== New millennium ===
After a four-year hiatus, rumours of mental illness began to spread. In an interview, Cobain revealed that he had been undertaking spiritual experimentation and had dealt with a bout of mercury poisoning, with over one hundred times the amount deemed to be safe. He gained much from his experience, realising that he could use music as a tool for psychic exploration, entertainment, and healing. The pair returned in 2002 with "The Isness", a record heavily influenced by 1960s and 1970s psychedelia and released under their alias Amorphous Androgynous. It was preceded by Papua New Guinea Translations, a mini album which contained a mixture of remixes of FSOL's track as well as new material from The Isness sessions. The album received mixed press due to the drastic change in sound which was inspired by Cobain's and Dougan's (separate) travels to India and immersion in spiritualism, nevertheless the majority was positive with Muzik magazine offering the album a 6/5 mark and dubbing it "...a white beam of light from heaven..." and other British publications such as The Times, The Guardian and MOJO praising the album and the band's ability to do something so completely different from what they had done before.

Three years on, they followed the album with a continuation of the Amorphous Androgynous project, Alice in Ultraland. Rumoured to be accompanied by a film of the same title, the album took The Isness' psychedelic experimentation and toned it down, giving the album a singular theme and sound, and replacing the more bizarre moments with funk and ambient interludes. The album was ignored by the press, but was received more favourably among fans than its predecessor. Unlike The Isness, which featured almost 100 musicians over the course of it and the various alternative versions and remix albums, Alice in Ultraland featured a fairly solid band lineup throughout, which extended to live shows which the band had undertaken away from the ISDN cables from 2005 onwards.

...song form has just become too limited. And when I say 'psychedelic', it's not a reference to 60s music but to the basic outlook of a child, which we all have. I think this is the only salvation now. Dance music taught us how to use the studio in a new way, but we have to now take that knowledge and move on with it. This stuff, electronic music, is not dead. It's a process that is ongoing. We have to take hold of the past and go forward with it...

— Cobain on the new Amorphous Androgynous sound

=== 5.1 and digital experimentation ===
The FSOL moniker re-appeared in 2006 with a piece entitled "A Gigantic Globular Burst of Anti-Static", intended as an experiment in 5.1 Surround Sound and created for an exhibition at the Kinetica art museum entitled, appropriately, "Life Forms". The piece contained reworked material from their archives and newer, more abstract ambient music. The piece was coupled with a video called "Stereo Sucks", marking the band's theories on the limitations of stereo music, which was released on a DVD packaged with issue 182 of Future Music Magazine in December 2006 and on FSOL's own download site in March 2007.

They also moved into creating their own sounds when they began constructing electronic instruments, the result of which can be heard on the 2007 release Hand-Made Devices. At their website Glitch TV (where the motto is "[A] sudden interruption in sanity, continuity or programme function") they sell and explain their devices such as the "Electronic Devices Digital Interface" glitch equipment.

=== FSOLdigital and the Archives ===
In 2007, the band uploaded several archive tracks online, for the first time revealing much of their unreleased work and unveiling some of the mystery behind the band. The old FSOL material, including the previously unreleased album Environments, along with a selection of newer experiments, the 5.1 experiments and a promise of unreleased Amorphous Androgynous psychedelic material, was uploaded for sale on their online shop, FSOLdigital.com.

The FSOLdigital platform has performed very well – we are delighted that people still dig us – we dig you all too.

— Brian Dougans on the positive reaction to the site and Archives sales

In early March 2008, the band released a new online album as Amorphous Androgynous entitled The Peppermint Tree and Seeds of Superconsciousness, which they describe as "A collection of psychedelic relics from The Amorphous Androgynous, 1967–2007". The release retains the sound of their last two psychedelic albums, while expanding on the element of funk first introduced on 2005's Alice in Ultraland. They recorded their following album, The Woodlands of Old, under the alias of their imaginary engineer Yage. Unlike the techno work recorded as Yage in 1992, this new record was darker, more trip hop and world music-oriented and featured ex-Propellerheads member Will White.

From 2008, the band showcased a series of radio broadcasts and podcasts called The Electric Brain Storms, originally on stations such as Proton Radio, PBS radio in Australia, and Frisky Radio. The remaining shows appeared on the band's official site and SoundCloud. The shows featured electronic, krautrock, experimental and psychedelic favourites of the band mixed in with known and unknown FSOL material, including newly recorded tracks, archived pieces, and new alias recordings. Many of the new tracks appeared on the band's Environments series. Cobain has described the new music as having "the introspective, kind of euphoric sadness that was always there in the FSOL melodies".

From this point, the band have been alternating their focus between different projects. In 2008, Environments II and From the Archives Vol. 5 were released on the band's site, followed by Environments 3 and From the Archives Vol. 6 in 2010; and Environments 4 and From the Archives Vol. 7 in 2012. Whilst the Archives feature old, unreleased material, the Environments albums feature a mixture of old demos, recently completed, and new tracks.

The band have continued to use the FSOLDigital platform to release side-projects and solo work, under names such as Blackhill Transmitter, EMS : Piano, Suburban Domestic and 6 Oscillators in Remittance, as well as distributing digital releases from other artists, including Daniel Pemberton, Herd, Kettel & Secede, Neotropic, Ross Baker and Seafar; they also continue to update The Pod Room with ISDN transmissions from the 1990s.

=== A Monstrous Psychedelic Bubble Exploding in Your Mind ===
Following on from the band's 1997 DJ set of the same name, a series of Monstrous Psychedelic Bubble Exploding in Your Mind mix CDs were begun in 2006. The first two were released under the Amorphous Androgynous alias, subtitled "Cosmic Space Music" and "Pagan Love Vibrations", with the first taking over two years to compile, mix and gain sample clearance, both featuring the band's psychedelic influences. A third is set for release sometime in 2010, and will be more electronic, mixed by the Future Sound of London. Further mixes in the series are expected in the future, to be curated by related artists, and the band took the concept live with an eleven-hour spot at 2009's Green Man festival, to contain live bands and DJ spots.

Noel Gallagher of British rock band Oasis, after hearing the first release, became a fan and asked the band to remix the following Oasis single "Falling Down". The Amorphous Androgynous responded with a 5 part, 22-minute Monstrous Psychedelic Bubble remix, which Noel liked enough to release on its own 12". Noel also invited Cobain to DJ at the afterparty for one of Oasis' gigs at Wembley Arena.

The band continue the psychedelic theme to the mixes on their podcast site The Pod Room and on February 2010s Mojo Magazine cover CD. The Monstrous Psychedelic Bubble remixes grow in popularity with commissions from Paul Weller and Pop Levi, and Cobain has suggested a full album of remixes and covers will appear on their recently formed Monstrous Bubble label

On 6 July 2011 it was announced that Noel Gallagher's second solo album would be in collaboration with The Amorphous Androgynous, and was set for release in 2012. In August 2012, Gallagher mentioned in various interviews that he was considering scrapping the collaborative album with Amorphous Androgynous due to not being completely satisfied with the mixes. Two songs from the project have surfaced as B-sides to Gallagher's singles in 2012: "Shoot a Hole into the Sun" (based on Gallagher's track "If I Had a Gun...") was a B-side to the single "Dream On", and a mix of "AKA... What a Life!" featured on the B-side of "Everybody's on the Run". However, as the project was shelved in November 2012, the group have returned to original material, releasing the first in a series of Monstrous Bubble Soundtracks, entitled The Cartel. On Noel Gallagher's High Flying Birds' album Chasing Yesterday, The Amorphous Androgynous are credited as Co-producers of the tracks "The Right Stuff" and "The Mexican".

=== Recent work ===
With the freedom of working independently from a record label, the group have remained prolific, working on multiple projects at once. Since 2014, the majority of releases through FSOLDigital have been of newly recorded material, with Environment Five being the first in the series to feature all new tracks. Since then, FSOL releases have been less conventional, with Environment Six being split over three volumes, named Environment Six, Environment 6.5 and Environmental, the latter part of a triple LP release called Archived : Environmental : Views. Similarly, Environment 7 is a trilogy, with its first volume released for Record Store Day 2022 under the name Rituals. In a move further from traditional structures, several albums have been released under the banner FSOLDigital Presents, including yearly Calendar Albums, presented to subscribers as a track each month, and mix albums as part of the A Controlled Vista and Mind Maps series. FSOLDigital has also been used as a publishing outlet, with books exploring the artwork and history of the band, each combined with a music package; a series of A6 books entitled The Ramblings of a Madman was also produced, with the accompanying download EPs later repackaged into an album entitled Music for 3 Books. Alongside books, the band have further explored multimedia, including a series of digital artwork releases as NFTs on Foundation and a pair of synthesisers created in collaboration with Digitana, the SX-1 and the HALia, the former being manufactured as of July 2018, the latter still in pre-production. A series of re-recordings of older tracks, combined with new remixes and related material, was released between 2018 and 2021 for Record Store Day, in place of conventional reissues; the reissue series so far features My Kingdom Re-Imagined, Yage 2019, Cascade 2020 and We Have Explosive 2021.

As well as The Future Sound of London, Dougans and Cobain have also revisited older side-projects. Dougans's solo project Humanoid has been active again since 2014, releasing the albums Built by Humanoid and 7 Songs as well as a string of EPs. Meanwhile, Cobain, in collaboration with Dougans and new co-producer Enrico Berto, began work on new Amorphous Androgynous material, with a double album of versions and remixes of the track "We Persuade Ourselves We Are Immortal" appearing in 2020. Alongside contributors such as Paul Weller, Ray Fenwick and Brian Hopper, the release features lead vocals by Peter Hammill, who is also credited on the album cover. Further alias releases have included albums released under the Blackhill Transmitter and Synthi-A names, as well as collaborations with Imogen H. Baker and Daniel Pemberton.

== Independence ==
Since the millennium, FSOL took a more independent turn with their career, releasing their more psychedelic Amorphous Androgynous on an independent label, The Isness on Artful Records and Alice in Ultraland on the progressive Harvest Records (an arm of EMI). They also have their own label called Electronic Brain Violence on which off-beat electronic artists such as Oil and Simon Wells (Headstone Lane) have released EPs and singles. Simon Wells also contributed to Dead Cities on the track "Dead Cities Reprise"

Nevertheless, Virgin records still controls FSOL's back catalog and was going to release the Teachings from the Electronic Brain compilation without them, but the duo insisted on taking control of the production of the project. Cobain says that, even with Virgin, the reason they were able to do their own thing and create the music they wanted in the 1990s was because they already had some major hits under their belts such as "Papua New Guinea", "Metropolis" and "Stakker Humanoid" before joining the label.

Why is it, everybody, from the fucking fish and chip shop to a magazine ends up selling itself, getting the millions and retiring. Why don't people keep going with it, why can't they change it so that it keeps being important to them. Why didn't Anita Roddick keep going with Body Shop, why did it get so alien to her that she had to sell it, why? Surely she's making so many millions she can get the right people that she loves to keep going with the ethos; there's something dangerous there.

— Garry Cobain on people becoming successful only to quit

Cobain has said that FSOL's mentality has always been about making a journey of an album rather than focusing on trying to have hit singles. He said that they had several top 40 singles (and albums) in the 90s because they had enough fans and had built up enough of a reputation to achieve these hits while still concentrating on the album rather than any potential singles during their time at Virgin.

They have been signed to Passion Records sub-label Jumpin' & Pumpin' since they started out.

== Discography ==
- Accelerator (1992)
- Cascade (1993)
- Lifeforms (1994)
- ISDN (1994)
- Dead Cities (1996)
- Environments (2007)
- Environments II (2008)
- Environments 3 (2010)
- Environments 4 (2012)
- Environment Five (2014)
- Environment Six (2016)
- Environment 6.5 (2016)
- Rituals E7.001 (2022)
- A Space of Partial Illumination E7.002 (2022)
- Environment 7.003 (2023)

== Chart history ==
=== Singles charts ===
Year	Single	Chart	Position
1988	"Stakker Humanoid"	UK Singles Chart	17
1989	"Slam"	UK Singles Chart	54
1992	"Papua New Guinea"	UK Singles Chart	22
1992	"Stakker Humanoid '92"	UK Singles Chart	40
1993	"Cascade"	UK Singles Chart	27
1994	"Expander"	UK Singles Chart	72
1994	"Lifeforms (feat. Elizabeth Fraser)"	UK Singles Chart	14
1995	"The Far-Out Son of Lung and the Ramblings of a Madman"	UK Singles Chart	22
1996	"My Kingdom"	UK Singles Chart	13
1997	"We Have Explosive"	UK Singles Chart	12
2001	"Stakker Humanoid 2001"	UK Singles Chart	65
2001	"Papua New Guinea 2001"	UK Singles Chart	28

=== Album charts ===
Year	Album	Chart	Position
1992	Accelerator	UK Albums Chart	75
1994	Lifeforms	UK Albums Chart	6
1994	ISDN	UK Albums Chart	44
1996	Dead Cities	UK Albums Chart	26
2002	The Isness	UK Albums Chart	68

== See also ==
- List of ambient music artists
- Max Richter
