= Dave Sardy =

American musician, composer and producer (born 1967)

- Born: David Stuart Sardy; 1967 (age 58–59); Brooklyn, New York, U.S.
- Genres: Film score; alternative rock; hard rock; indie rock
- Occupations: Film composer; musician; songwriter; record producer

David Stuart Sardy (born 1967), more commonly known as D. Sardy, is an American composer, musician, songwriter, and multiple Grammy winning record producer. He came to prominence as the leader of 1990s noise rock band Barkmarket before turning mostly to production work, often with alternative rock, hard rock, electronic related genres, and then to scoring feature films.

== Biography ==
In the late 1980s and early 1990s, Sardy was active as a singer, songwriter and guitarist (most notably with his group Barkmarket), but since the mid-1990s, he has been more active as a producer, writer, composer and mixer. He has worked with an eclectic mix of rock, punk, alternative, electronic and industrial rock performers, and critics have called him a "Hardcore super-producer."

In 2006, Sardy won six ARIA Awards for his work with Jet and again in 2008, three more ARIA awards for Wolfmother; he has also received five Grammy Awards (for Toots and the Maytals, Rodrigo y Gabriela, OK Go, Wolfmother and Marilyn Manson) and multiple Brit Awards for Oasis, Marilyn Manson, Wolfmother and The Ting Tings. He was Grammy-nominated again in 2007 for LCD Soundsystem's Sound of Silver and in 2010 for the Band of Horses album Infinite Arms.

Sardy has been involved with some of the most popular licensed music for film and advertising. Although never writing directly for commercials, he has produced music used in many campaigns, including 3 key iPod campaigns: Jet, Wolfmother, and The Ting Tings.

He produced Oasis' seventh studio album, Dig Out Your Soul, in 2008, the last of the band's original run. This was Sardy's second time working with the band, having produced their 2005 album Don't Believe the Truth and he worked with member Noel Gallagher again in 2011 on the self-titled debut album of his solo project Noel Gallagher's High Flying Birds.

Sardy scored the Stage 6 Films logo for Sony Pictures Entertainment, as well as the films 21 and Zombieland, and the drama End of Watch, written and directed by David Ayer, all of which went to number one at the US box office. More recently, Sardy contributed work to The Green Hornet, Lawless, and Eat Pray Love and scored Premium Rush, Ghost Rider: Spirit of Vengeance, Sabotage, and The Beekeper working once again with director David Ayer.

In 2019, Sardy produced a new studio album by The Who. And in 2020, he co-wrote and produced a new Modest Mouse album called The Golden Casket.

Sardy's sister Marcia Schofield played keyboards for the British band The Fall.

== Film scores ==
Year	Title	Director	Studio(s)	Notes
2008	21	Robert Luketic	Columbia Pictures; Relativity Media; Trigger Street Productions	Also music supervisor
2009	Zombieland	Ruben Fleischer	Columbia Pictures; Relativity Media; Pariah	—N/a
2012	Ghost Rider: Spirit of Vengeance	Neveldine/Taylor	Columbia Pictures; Marvel Knights; Crystal Sky Pictures; Hyde Park Entertainment; Imagination Abu Dhabi	—N/a
2012	21 Jump Street	Phil Lord; Christopher Miller	Columbia Pictures; Relativity Media; Original Film; SCJ Studios	Composer of additional music Composed by Mark Mothersbaugh
2012	Premium Rush	David Koepp	Columbia Pictures; Pariah	—N/a
2012	End of Watch	David Ayer	Open Road Films; StudioCanal; Exclusive Media; Crave Films; CECTV Films; Emmett/Furla Films	—N/a
2014	Sabotage	David Ayer	Open Road Films; Universal Pictures; Albert S. Ruddy Productions; Crave Films; QED International; Roth Films	—N/a
2016	Monster Trucks	Chris Wedge	Paramount Pictures; Paramount Animation; Disruption Entertainment	—N/a
2017	Bright	David Ayer	Netflix; Overbrook Entertainment	—N/a
2019	Zombieland: Double Tap	Ruben Fleischer	Columbia Pictures; Pariah	—N/a
2021	Ida Red	John Swab	Saban Films; Roxwell Films	—N/a
2022	A Lot of Nothing	Mo McRae	RLJE Films; Secret Society Films; Scalable Content; Traction; Anonymous Content	—N/a
2022	Candy Land	John Swab	Quiver Distribution; Roxwell Films	—N/a
2023	Little Dixie	John Swab	Paramount Pictures; Roxwell Films; TPC	—N/a
2023	One Day as a Lion	John Swab	Grindstone Entertainment Group; Roxwell Films	—N/a
2024	The Beekeeper	David Ayer	Metro-Goldwyn-Mayer; Miramax; Cedar Park; Punch Palace Productions	Co-composed with Jared Michael Fry
2024	Long Gone Heroes	John Swab	Lionsgate; Grindstone Entertainment Group; Phoenix Media & Entertainment	—N/a

== Productions ==
Sardy has produced and mixed on the following albums, among others:

- 1989: Arena of Shame by Carey's Problem (producer)
- 1991: Vegas Throat by Barkmarket (producer)
- 1991: White Noise by Cop Shoot Cop (mixing on "Chameleon Man")
- 1992: Manic Frustration by Trouble (mixing)
- 1993: Gimmick by Barkmarket (producer)
- 1993: Curb Your Dogma by Spongehead (producer)
- 1994: Brainwash by Spongehead (producer)
- 1994: Lardroom by Barkmarket (producer)
- 1994: Release by Cop Shoot Cop (mixing on all except "Ambulance Song", producer)
- 1995: Johnny Mnemonic (Music from the Motion Picture) (producer on "3 AM Incident" by Cop Shoot Cop)
- 1995: One Hot Minute by Red Hot Chili Peppers (mixing)
- 1995: Working Class Hero: A Tribute to John Lennon (mixing on "I Found Out" by Red Hot Chili Peppers)
- 1995: Peacekeeper by Barkmarket (producer)
- 1996: Twister: Music from the Motion Picture Soundtrack (mixing on "Melancholy Mechanics" by Red Hot Chili Peppers)
- 1996: Undisputed Attitude by Slayer (producer, mixing)
- 1996: L. Ron by Barkmarket (mixing)
- 1996: Music for Our Mother Ocean (producer on "Army of Me" by Helmet)
- 1996: Tragic by Orange 9mm (producer)
- 1997: Aftertaste by Helmet (producer)
- 1997: Fantastic Spikes Through Balloon by Skeleton Key (producer, mixing)
- 1998: Water & Solutions by Far (producer)
- 1998: System of a Down by System of a Down (mixing)
- 1998: Imprint by Vision of Disorder (producer, mixing)
- 1998: Chef Aid: The South Park Album (mixing)
- 1998: Much Against Everyone's Advice by Soulwax (producer, mixing)
- 1998: Boogie-Children-R-Us by Evil Superstars (producer, mixing)
- 1999: 60 Second Wipe Out by Atari Teenage Riot (mixing on "No Success")
- 1999: Big Daddy: Music from the Motion Picture (mixing on "Instant Pleasure" by Rufus Wainwright)
- 1999: Detroit Rock City: Music from the Motion Picture (mixing on "Highway to Hell" by Marilyn Manson)
- 1999: Northern Star by Melanie C (mixing on "Ga Ga")
- 1999: MTV Celebrity Deathmatch (mixing on "Astonishing Panorama of the Endtimes" by Marilyn Manson)
- 1999: The Last Tour on Earth by Marilyn Manson (mixing)
- 1999: Believo! by Enon (producer, mixing)
- 1999: "Fly South" by Enon (mixing)
- 2000: Counterbalance by Harmful (producer, mixing)
- 2000: Nativity in Black (producer and mixing on "Into the Void" by Monster Magnet)
- 2000: Thirteen Tales from Urban Bohemia by The Dandy Warhols (mixing on all except "Cool Scene" and "Shakin'", additional production)
- 2000: The Hour of Bewilderbeast by Badly Drawn Boy (mixing on "Pissing in the Wind")
- 2000: The Dream That Stuff Was Made Of by Starlight Mints (producer, mixing)
- 2000: Holy Wood (In the Shadow of the Valley of Death) by Marilyn Manson (producer, mixing)
- 2000: Renegades by Rage Against the Machine (mixing on "The Ghost of Tom Joad" and "Street Fighting Man")
- 2000: Dracula 2000 (producer and mixing on "The Metro" by System of a Down)
- 2001: Songs from a Bad Hat by Mauro Pawlowski (producer, mixing)
- 2001: Top Dollar by Toby Dammit (mixing)
- 2001: Golden State by Bush (producer, mixing)
- 2002: Music for the Last Day of Your Life by Dragpipe (producer, mixing)
- 2002: Ideas Above Our Station by Hundred Reasons (producer, mixing)
- 2002: New Detention by Grinspoon (mixing on "Chemical Heart")
- 2002: High Society by Enon (producer)
- 2002: Life on Other Planets by Supergrass (mixing)
- 2002: The Blueprint 2: The Gift & The Curse by Jay-Z (mixing on "Guns & Roses")
- 2003: Tell Them Hi by Campfire Girls (producer and mixing on all except "Make It", "Day Before", and "Fancy Shirt")
- 2003: No Push Collide by Serafin (producer, mixing)
- 2003: Above the Noise by The Revolution Smile (producer)
- 2003: Get Born by Jet (producer, mixing)
- 2003: Unearthed by Johnny Cash (mixing)
- 2004: Bows + Arrows by The Walkmen (producer on "The Rat")
- 2004: Shatterproof Is Not a Challenge by Hundred Reasons (producer, mixing)
- 2004: Music from and Inspired by Spider-Man 2 (producer and mixing on "Hold On" by Jet)
- 2004: Decadence by Head Automatica (mixing)
- 2004: Alive & Amplified by The Mooney Suzuki (mixing)
- 2004: Let's Bottle Bohemia by The Thrills (producer, mixing)
- 2004: Future Perfect by Autolux (mixing)
- 2005: Lost Marbles & Exploded Evidence by Enon (producer and mixing on "Marbles Explode", mixing on "Party Favor")
- 2005: Elevator by Hot Hot Heat (producer, mixing)
- 2005: Don't Believe the Truth by Oasis (producer, mixing)
- 2005: "Love Is Not Enough" (Live at Rehearsals) by Nine Inch Nails (mixing)
- 2005: Oh No by OK Go (mixing)
- 2005: A Bigger Bang by The Rolling Stones (mixing on "Rough Justice")
- 2005: Hearts and Unicorns by Giant Drag (producer on "Wicked Game")
- 2005: Wolfmother by Wolfmother (producer, mixing)
- 2005: Goal! (Music from the Motion Picture) (mixing on "Morning Glory" (D. Sardy Mix) by Oasis)
- 2006: Waterloo to Anywhere by Dirty Pretty Things (producer and mixing for half the tracks)
- 2006: Riot City Blues by Primal Scream (mixing)
- 2006: The Bright Lights and What I Should Have Learned by Duels (mixing on "Brothers and Sisters")
- 2006: Beyond Virtue, Beyond Vice by VAUX (mixing)
- 2006: Le Futur Noir by The Strays (mixing)
- 2006: Shine On by Jet (producer, mixing)
- 2006: Robbers & Cowards by Cold War Kids (mixing)
- 2007: Sound of Silver by LCD Soundsystem (mixing)
- 2007: Music from and Inspired by Spider-Man 3 (producer, mixing)
- 2007: Black Lives at the Golden Coast by The Icarus Line (mixing on "Gets Paid")
- 2007: Carry On by Chris Cornell (mixing on "You Know My Name")
- 2007: Love/Hate by Nine Black Alps (producer)
- 2008: In the Future by Black Mountain (mixing and producer on "Stay Free")
- 2008: Stars and the Sea by Boy Kill Boy (producer, mixing)
- 2008: We Started Nothing by The Ting Tings (mixing)
- 2008: Fortress Round My Heart by Ida Maria (mixing on all except "Leave Me", "Keep Me Warm", "In the End", and "We're All Going to Hell (Live)")
- 2008: "Big Ideas" by LCD Soundsystem (producer)
- 2008: Dig Out Your Soul by Oasis (producer, mixing)
- 2008: The Long Now by Children Collide (producer)
- 2009: Morning Maid by Satin Peaches (producer)
- 2009: Before Nightfall by Robert Francis (producer, mixing)
- 2009: Twisted Wheel by Twisted Wheel (producer)
- 2009: Crash Kings by Crash Kings (producer, mixing)
- 2009: A French Kiss in the Chaos by Reverend and The Makers (mixing)
- 2009: My Old, Familiar Friend by Brendan Benson (additional production on "A Whole Lot Better", "Garbage Day", "Don't Wanna Talk", and "Borrow", mixing)
- 2009: Come Sing These Crippled Tunes by The Cubical (producer, mixing)
- 2009: Das Pop by Das Pop (mixing on "Underground", "Wings", "Never Get Enough", "Try Again", and "Feelgood Factors")
- 2009: Daisy by Brand New (mixing on all except "Be Gone")
- 2009: Sainthood by Tegan and Sara (mixing)
- 2010: Transference by Spoon (mixing)
- 2010: Latin by Holy Fuck (mixing on "Stilettos")
- 2010: This Is Happening by LCD Soundsystem (mixing)
- 2010: Infinite Arms by Band of Horses (mixing)
- 2010: Stone Temple Pilots by Stone Temple Pilots (mixing)
- 2010: New Politics by New Politics (producer, mixing)
- 2010: Transit Transit by Autolux (additional production and mixing on "Highchair", "Sports", and "Audience No. 2")
- 2010: "Supertoys" by Autolux (mixing on "Curtains")
- 2010: Phosphene Dream by The Black Angels (producer, mixing)
- 2010: Wilderness Heart by Black Mountain (producer on "The Hair Song", "Rollercoaster", "Buried by the Blues", "The Way to Gone", and "The Space of Your Mind", mixing)
- 2010: Ignite by Shihad (mixing)
- 2010: King Night by SALEM (mixing)
- 2011: The Golden Age of Knowhere by Funeral Party (mixing)
- 2011: All at Once by The Airborne Toxic Event (producer, mixing)
- 2011: Hillbilly Joker by Hank Williams III (producer)
- 2011: Noel Gallagher's High Flying Birds by Noel Gallagher's High Flying Birds (producer, mixing)
- 2011: Fallen Empires by Snow Patrol (mixing)
- 2012: "DoYaThing" by Gorillaz featuring André 3000 and James Murphy (mixing)
- 2012: Aloha Moon by Magic Wands (mixing on "Black Magic" and "Space")
- 2012: Lex Hives by The Hives (mixing on "Take Back the Toys")
- 2012: Lawless: Original Motion Picture Soundtrack by Nick Cave and Warren Ellis (producer)
- 2012: La Futura by ZZ Top (producer, mixing)
- 2012: Control Control Control by Goose (mixing)
- 2013: Save Rock and Roll by Fall Out Boy (mixing)
- 2013: Orthodox by Beware of Darkness (executive producer, mixing)
- 2013: Pick Up Your Head by Middle Class Rut (mixing)
- 2014: Caustic Love by Paolo Nutini (producer on "Scream (Funk My Life Up)" and "Fashion")
- 2014: Ramblin' Man by Hank Williams III (producer on "Hang On" and "Runnin' and Gunnin'")
- 2014: Royal Blood by Royal Blood (mixing on "Figure It Out")
- 2014: Lost in Alphaville by The Rentals (mixing)
- 2014: The Physical World by Death from Above 1979 (producer, recording, mixing)
- 2015: Time by Mikky Ekko (producer on "Riot")
- 2015: "Mene" by Brand New (mixing)
- 2016: Lonely Is a Lifetime by The Wild Feathers (mixing)
- 2016: The Ride by Catfish and the Bottlemen (producer, mixing)
- 2016: Signs of Light by The Head and the Heart (mixing)
- 2017: 8 by Incubus (co-producer, uncredited)
- 2018: Mania by Fall Out Boy (Producer)
- 2018: The Magic Gang by The Magic Gang (mixer)
- 2018: Eat the Elephant by A Perfect Circle (producer)
- 2019: Mystic Truth by Bad Suns (producer)
- 2019: WHO by The Who (producer, mixing)
- 2019: U-Roy (album, mixing)
- 2020: Toots And The Maytals(album, mixing)
- 2020: Band Of Horses (album, Additional production, mixing)
- 2020: The Record Company (producer)
- 2020: Blue Moon Rising EP by Noel Gallagher's High Flying Birds (producer track 3)
- Health
- The Shelters
- Noel Gallagher's High Flying Birds
- 2021: The Golden Casket by Modest Mouse (producer)

=== Other musical contributions ===
- 1988: 1-800-Godhouse by Barkmarket (writer on all except "Mercenaries (Ready for War)")
- 1989: Easy Listening by Barkmarket (songwriter on all except "Pink Stainless Tail", voice, guitar, bass, tapes, utilized objects, engineer)
- 1993: Frank Black by Frank Black (additional guitar)
- 1993: Gimmick by Barkmarket (guitar, vocals, banjo, tape, engineer)
- 1994: Lardroom by Barkmarket (guitar, vocals)
- 1994: Release by Cop Shoot Cop (engineer on all except "Ambulance Song")
- 1994: The Cult by The Cult (engineer)
- 1995: Further Down the Spiral by Nine Inch Nails (engineer on "Piggy (Nothing Can Stop Me Now)")
- 1995: One Hot Minute by Red Hot Chili Peppers (engineer)
- 1995: Peacekeeper by Barkmarket (guitar, vocals, engineer)
- 1996: Twister: Music from the Motion Picture Soundtrack (engineer on "Melancholy Mechanics" by Red Hot Chili Peppers)
- 1996: L. Ron by Barkmarket (guitar, vocals, engineer)
- 1996: Music for Our Mother Ocean (engineer on "Army of Me" by Helmet)
- 1996: Tragic by Orange 9mm (engineer)
- 1996: Sutras by Donovan (bells on "High Your Love")
- 1997: Private Parts: The Album (engineer on "I Make My Own Rules" by LL Cool J and "Pictures of Matchstick Men" by Ozzy Osbourne)
- 1997: Aftertaste by Helmet (engineer)
- 1998: Water & Solutions by Far (Mellotron on "Bury White", organ on "Man Overboard", anti-solo on "Another Way Out")
- 1998: System of a Down by System of a Down (additional engineering)
- 1998: Imprint by Vision of Disorder (organ on "Jada Bloom")
- 1998: Chef Aid: The South Park Album (engineer on "Nowhere to Run (Vapor Trail)" by The Crystal Method and on "The Rainbow" by Ween)
- 1998: Boogie-Children-R-Us by Evil Superstars (guitar on "Song Off the Record")
- 1999: Lotofire by Ely Guerra (additional guitar)
- 1999: "Fly South" by Enon (editor)
- 2000: American III: Solitary Man by Johnny Cash (additional engineering)
- 2000: Holy Wood (In the Shadow of the Valley of Death) by Marilyn Manson (rhythm guitar on "Godeatgod", drum programming on "Burning Flag")
- 2001: Golden State by Bush (additional musician, miscellaneous sonics)
- 2001: Songs from a Bad Hat by Mauro Pawlowski (slide guitar on "Finish It All Off (With Love)")
- 2003: Tell Them Hi by Campfire Girls (percussion, backing vocals)
- 2003: Get Born by Jet (guitar on "Are You Gonna Be My Girl", slide guitar on "Lazy Gun")
- 2005: Lost Marbles & Exploded Evidence by Enon (bass on "Marbles Explode", engineer on "Party Favor")
- 2005: Elevator by Hot Hot Heat (additional percussion, additional guitar)
- 2005: Wolfmother by Wolfmother (percussion on "Colossal", "Where Eagles Have Been", and "Vagabond")
- 2006: Shine On by Jet (sitar on "Come On Come On", percussion)
- 2008: In the Future by Black Mountain (engineer on "Stay Free")
- 2009: My Old, Familiar Friend by Brendan Benson (additional engineering on "A Whole Lot Better", "Garbage Day", "Don't Wanna Talk", and "Borrow", additional guitars)
- 2009: Come Sing These Crippled Tunes by The Cubical (mastering)
- 2010: The Wild Trapeze by Brandon Boyd (additional instrumentation)
- 2010: Eat Pray Love: Original Motion Picture Soundtrack (extra percussion, extra strings on "Better Days" by Eddie Vedder)
- 2011: Wildlife by The Icarus Line (engineer)
- 2011: Noel Gallagher's High Flying Birds by Noel Gallagher's High Flying Birds (drum programming)
- 2012: Lawless: Original Motion Picture Soundtrack by Nick Cave and Warren Ellis (musician)
- 2012: La Futura by ZZ Top (string arrangement, piano, organ, writer on "Flyin' High")
- 2014: The Physical World by Death from Above 1979 (engineer)
- 2015: Time by Mikky Ekko (musician on "Riot")

Other productions include:

Film soundtracks: The Green Hornet, Wanted, Lock, Stock and Two Smoking Barrels, I Love You, Man, Igby Goes Down, Flushed Away, Shrek the Third, Jackass Number Two, Shoot 'Em Up, The Replacements, Little Nicky, Antitrust, Sugar & Spice, Crazy/Beautiful, Summer Catch, Clockstoppers, Mayor of the Sunset Strip, Foolproof, Dig!, Delirious, Man of the Year, Numb, If I Stay, The Big Bounce, The Holiday, Wild Hogs, What Happens in Vegas, A Lot like Love, Grind, Going the Distance, EuroTrip, The Longest Yard, She's Out of My League, Battle of the Year, TMNT, The Comebacks, Drillbit Taylor, School for Scoundrels, The Game Plan, Spring Breakdown, 500 Days of Summer, Lesbian Vampire Killers, The Hangover, MacGruber, Here Comes the Boom, The Snow Queen 2: The Snow King, War Dogs

TV show soundtracks: The Sopranos, Cold Case, Entourage, One Tree Hill, Criminal Minds, CSI: NY, Grey's Anatomy, Scrubs, The O.C., Six Feet Under, Buffy the Vampire Slayer, Chuck, Fresh Meat, Beauty and the Geek Australia, Roswell, Teachers, Dancing with the Stars, Skins, 24, and Ed.

Video game soundtracks: Guitar Hero, Rock Band, Gran Turismo 4, Le Mans 24 Hours, MotorStorm, Pure, Saints Row 2, NHL 2004, Tony Hawk's Project 8, FlatOut 2, and Rugby 06.
