= Twisted Wheel =

Twisted Wheel may refer to:

- Twisted Wheel Club, a nightclub in Manchester, England
- Twisted Wheel (band), an indie rock band from Saddleworth, Greater Manchester, England
  - Twisted Wheel (album), 2009
