= Apocalypse Whenever =

Studio album by Bad Suns
- Released: January 28, 2022
- Recorded: 2020–2021
- Genre: Indie rock; post-punk
- Length: 47:52
- Label: Epitaph
- Producer: Eric Palmquist

Bad Suns chronology
Mystic Truth (2019)	Apocalypse Whenever (2022)	Infinite Joy (2023)

Singles from Apocalypse Whenever
- 1. "Baby Blue Shades" Released: September 28, 2020; 2. "Heaven Is a Place in My Head" Released: June 1, 2021; 3. "When the World Was Mine" Released: September 21, 2021; 4. "Wishing Fountains" Released: November 9, 2021; 5. "Peachy" Released: December 8, 2021; 6. "Life Was Easier When I Only Cared About Me" Released: January 11, 2022

Apocalypse Whenever is the fourth studio album by indie rock band Bad Suns, released on Epitaph Records on January 28, 2022. It is their first album since Mystic Truth (2019)

On September 28, 2020, Bad Suns released the first single, "Baby Blue Shades". The single was produced by Eric Palmquist, who worked with the band on their first two albums, Language & Perspective and Disappear Here. The band released their second single, "Heaven Is a Place in My Head" on May 31, 2021. On September 21, 2021, they announced the title and release date, as well as released the single "When the World Was Mine". They released the singles "Wishing Fountains", "Peachy", and "Life Was Easier When I Only Cared About Me", ahead of the album's release. On January 28, 2022, the album was released and the band started their tour of the same name.

== Reception ==
Steve Beebee of Kerrang! gave Apocalypse Whenever a three out of five for having "deft songs, interesting and memorable hooks, plus lots of little melodic pay-offs that you don't necessarily appreciate until a second or third play", but concedes that the music is not great.

== Track listing ==
All lyrics written by Christo Bowman. All music written by Christo Bowman, Gavin Bennett, Miles Morris, and Ray Libby, except where noted.

1. "Apocalypse Whenever" – 3:38
2. "Summer Lightning" – 3:34
3. "Baby Blue Shades" (Bowman, Bennett, Morris, Libby, Eric Palmquist) – 3:40
4. "Peachy" (Bowman, Bennett, Morris, Libby, Palmquist) – 3:22
5. "When the World Was Mine" (Bowman, Bennett, Morris, Libby, Palmquist) – 3:30
6. "Wishing Fountains" – 3:35
7. "Electric Circus" – 3:24
8. "Nightclub (Waiting for You)" – 3:46
9. "Life Was Easier When I Only Cared About Me" (Bowman, Bennett, Morris, Libby, Sierra Deaton, Palmquist) – 3:51
10. "Heaven Is a Place in My Head" (Bowman, Bennett, Morris, Libby, Palmquist, Nick Long) – 3:51
11. "Silently Screaming" – 3:42
12. "Grace (I Think I'm in Love Again)" (Bowman, Bennett, Morris, Libby, Palmquist) – 3:34
13. "Symphony of Lights" – 4:19

== Personnel ==
Bad Suns

- Christo Bowman – vocals, guitar, keys, synths, vibraphone
- Gavin Bennett – bass guitar, keys, synths, backing vocals
- Miles Morris – drums, percussion, backing vocals
- Ray Libby – guitar, keys, backing vocals, shakers, bass guitar on "Electric Circus"

Additional musicians

- Strings on "Wishing Fountains" arranged by Nathaniel Walcott
- Cello on "Wishing Fountains" by Vanessa Freebairn-Smith
- Violin, viola on "Wishing Fountains" by Paul Cartwright
- Saxophone on "Silently Screaming" by John Waugh
- Background vocals on "Summer Lightning", "Peachy", and "Electric Circus" by Stephanie Williams
- Background vocals on "Electric Circus" by Svea Palmquist

Production personnel

- Eric Palmquist – production
- Mike Crossey – mixing
- Chris Geher – mastering
- Steven Aguilar, Cameron Rochte, Jake Munk – assistant engineering

Art and album personnel

- Art direction by Christo Bowman
- Photography by Lupe Bustos
- Layout and design by Kamtin Mohager
- Title font by Ray Libby
