= Curb Your Dogma =

Studio album by Spongehead
- Released: October 19, 1993
- Studio: Harold Dessau Recording (New York City)
- Genre: Noise rock
- Length: 46:09
- Label: Triple X
- Producer: Doug Henderson, Dave Sardy

Spongehead chronology
Legitimate Beef (1990)	Curb Your Dogma (1993)	Brainwash (1994)

Professional ratings
Review scores
Source	Rating
AllMusic	2.5/5 stars

Curb Your Dogma is the third studio album by Spongehead, released on October 19, 1993, by Triple X Records.

== Track listing ==
No.	Title	Writer(s)	Length
1.	"Nothing"	Doug Henderson, Mark Kirby	5:27
2.	"Metal Jesus Fucker"	Doug Henderson	4:45
3.	"Melting"	Marc Dale	4:23
4.	"Sweet Dream"	Doug Henderson	4:08
5.	"Chernobyl"	Doug Henderson, Mark Kirby	4:17
6.	"Gunfire"	Doug Henderson	4:29
7.	"Lies"	Doug Henderson	4:38
8.	"Mirror"	Dave Sardy	4:37
9.	"Love It or Leave It"	Doug Henderson	5:07
10.	"Pair O' Dimes"		4:16

== Personnel ==
Adapted from the Curb Your Dogma liner notes.

Spongehead

- David Henderson – bass saxophone, photography
- Doug Henderson – guitar, bass guitar, vocals, production
- Mark Kirby – drums, vocals

Production and additional personnel

- Ed Funk – photography
- John Nowlin – cover art, design, bass guitar (9)
- Dave Sardy – production, recording, mixing

== Release history ==
Region	Date	Label	Format	Catalog
United States	1993	Triple X	CD	51155
