= Gimmick (album) =

Studio album by Barkmarket
- Released: October 12, 1993
- Recorded: Harold Dessau, NYC
- Genre: Noise rock
- Length: 45:57
- Label: American
- Producer: Dave Sardy

Barkmarket chronology
Vegas Throat (1991)	Gimmick (1993)	Lardroom (1994)

Gimmick is the second studio album by the American noise rock band Barkmarket, released on October 12, 1993, by American Recordings.

== Reception ==
Professional ratings
Review scores
Source	Rating
AllMusic	4.5/5 stars

William Ruhlmann of AllMusic called the album "hard rock in a near-industrial mode--all relentlessly pounding drums and bass, relentlessy chording guitars, relentlessly ranting vocals."

== Track listing ==
All lyrics are written by Dave Sardy, except "Gatherer" by John Nowlin; all music is composed by Barkmarket.

No.	Title	Length
1.	"Easy Chair"	3:11
2.	"Whipping Boy"	3:55
3.	"Static"	5:13
4.	"Dumbjaw"	4:17
5.	"Gatherer"	1:38
6.	"Hack It Off"	2:16
7.	"Curio"	4:42
8.	"Redundant"	3:50
9.	"Radio Static"	4:24
10.	"Car Jack"	3:30
11.	"The Shill"	4:43
12.	"Better Made Man"	4:18

== Personnel ==
Adapted from the Gimmick liner notes.

Barkmarket

- John Nowlin – bass guitar
- Dave Sardy – lead vocals, guitar, banjo, tape, production, recording, mixing
- Rock Savage – drums, percussion

Additional musicians

- Doug Henderson – wasp synthesizer (3)
- Jane Scarpantoni – cello (12)

Production and additional personnel

- Greg Gordon – mixing
- Howie Weinberg – mastering

== Release history ==
Region	Date	Label	Format	Catalog
United States	1993	American	CD, CS, LP	45343
