= Disappear Here =

Disappear Here may refer to:

- Disappear Here (Silver Sun album), 2005
- Disappear Here (Hybrid album), 2010
- Disappear Here (Bad Suns album), 2016
- Disappear Here (EP), a 1992 EP by Peach
- Disappear Here, a 2005 album by LA Symphony
