= Kill Your Own =

Studio album by Hundred Reasons
- Released: 20 March 2006
- Recorded: Kore Studios, London; Mid-Late 2005
- Genre: Alternative rock
- Label: V2

Hundred Reasons chronology
Shatterproof Is Not a Challenge (2004)	Kill Your Own (2006)	Quick the Word, Sharp the Action (2007)

Professional ratings
Review scores
Source	Rating
Kerrang!	4/5 stars

Kill Your Own is the third studio album by English alternative rock band Hundred Reasons, released on 20 March 2006, on V2 Records. This is last album to feature guitarist Paul Townsend and the first to feature guitarist Larry Hibbitt as producer.

Guitarist and producer Larry Hibbitt stated that the album is:

"Quite an angry record. There are quite a few twisted moments and Colin's lyrics are a lot darker than before. At first the name seemed weird but after a while it just sort of made sense. It was the one that we just kept coming back to. It's a song about purposefully being a cunt to the people that you really love. It's when you really fuck people over, even when they're some of your closest mates."

Producer of band's previous two albums, Dave Sardy, mixed three tracks on the album, as well as b-side, "Casual Friday". According to bassist Andy Gilmour "Casual Friday" was omitted from the album because Hibbitt put an "irritating keyboard" on the song.

Many of the songs on Kill Your Own were debuted during their 2005 Winter tour of the UK's Barfly venues. Those who attended the shows were given a free CD, Singles Club 3, which included "Feed the Fire" alongside other tracks from support bands, Brigade and Orko.

In 2005, "No Pretending" was released in demo form from their official website. Demos of "Kill Your Own" and "This Mess" were also later made available before the album's release.

Kill Your Own entered the UK Albums Chart at #79, and entered the BBC Radio 1 Rock Chart at #3.

== Track listing ==
1. "Broken Hands" – 3:37
2. "Kill Your Own" – 3:45
3. "Destroy" – 3:22
4. "The Chance" – 3:32
5. "The Perfect Gift" – 3:50
6. "Live Fast, Die Ugly" – 2:32
7. "Feed The Fire" – 3:49
8. "This Mess" – 3:52
9. "A Better Way?" – 2:04
10. "No Pretending" – 4:33
11. "Breathe Again" – 6:43

=== B-sides ===
- "Casual Friday" - 3:30 (released with "Kill Your Own")
- "Good to Know" - 2:05 (released with "Kill Your Own")
- "Sometimes" - 3:23 (released with "Kill Your Own")
- "Sober and Conscious" - 3:36 (released with "The Perfect Gift")
- "Horizon" - 3:48 (released with "The Perfect Gift")
- "In Silence" - 3:05 (released with "The Perfect Gift")

== Singles released ==
- "Kill Your Own" (#45 UK)
- "The Perfect Gift" (#111 UK)
- "The Chance/Live Fast, Die Ugly" (Download package only)

== Personnel ==
- Colin Doran - lead vocals
- Larry Hibbitt - guitar, vocals, additional Percussion, keyboards, production, mixing
- Paul Townsend - guitar, vocals, lead vocals on "This Mess" (chorus)
- Andy Gilmour - bass, church organ on "Breathe Again"
- Andy Bews - drums
- Charles Dorman - engineer
- George Apsion - engineer
- Tariq Zaid al-Nasrawl - engineer
- Michelle Cade - studio assistant
- Dave Sardy - mixing ("Broken Hands", "The Chance" & "The Perfect Gift")
- Stephen Marcussen - mastering
- James Dehaan - drum tech
- Stuart Valentine - guitar tech
- Murdoch - artwork
- Do of you life this is you life you will be you life of ever day
