= Brainwash (EP) =

Record by Spongehead

EP by Spongehead
- Released: April 26, 1994
- Genre: Noise rock
- Length: 35:36
- Label: Triple X
- Producer: Doug Henderson, Dave Sardy

Spongehead chronology
Curb Your Dogma (1993)	Brainwash (1994)	Infinite Baffle (1996)

Brainwash is an EP record by Spongehead, released on April 26, 1994, by Triple X Records.

== Track listing ==
No.	Title	Writer(s)	Length
1.	"Don't Call Me Nigger, Whitey"	Sly Stone	3:49
2.	"VR"	Doug Henderson, Mark Kirby	3:41
3.	"Plumber's Lament"	Doug Henderson	3:35
4.	"Brainwash"	Doug Henderson	4:19
5.	"Jelly"	David Henderson, Doug Henderson	3:38
6.	"Bosnia"	Doug Henderson	4:53
99.	"plumber's [censored for radio]"		3:38

== Personnel ==
Adapted from the Brainwash liner notes.

Spongehead

- David Henderson – tenor saxophone, bass guitar
- Doug Henderson – guitar, bass guitar, vocals, Vox organ, production, engineering
- Mark Kirby – drums, Vox organ

Production and additional personnel

- Phill Brown – mastering
- Madeleine – photography, design
- John Nowlin – photography, design
- Dave Sardy – production, engineering
- Guy Yarden – violin (6)

== Release history ==
Region	Date	Label	Format	Catalog
United States	1994	Triple X	CD	51181
