= Ep Two =

Two

EP by Hundred Reasons
- Released: 6 August 2001
- Genre: Alternative rock
- Label: Sony Music
- Producer: Chris Sheldon

Hundred Reasons chronology
One (2000)	Two (2001)	Split w/Garrison (2001)

Two (also referred to as epTwo) is the second EP release by British alternative rock band Hundred Reasons. Released on 6 August 2001, the EP was their first on Columbia Records after signing to the label.

It features live favourite "Remmus" and two other songs - "Soapbox rally" and the original version of "Shine". "Shine" would later appear on their debut album Ideas Above Our Station. The CD also features the video for "Remmus".

== Track listing ==
1. "Remmus"
2. "Soapbox Rally"
3. "Shine"

=== 7" single ===
1. "Remmus"
2. "Soapbox Rally"
