= The Golden Age of Knowhere =

Studio album by Funeral Party
- Released: (Australia) January 21, 2011 (Digital) (United Kingdom) January 24, 2011 (Australia) January 28, 2011 (Physical) (United States) March 29, 2011
- Recorded: 2008 at Infrasonic Sound Studios, Alhambra, California
- Genre: Alternative rock, dance-punk
- Length: 44:05
- Label: RCA
- Producer: Lars Stalfors; David Corcos ("New York City Moves to the Sound of L.A.")

Singles from The Golden Age of Knowhere
- 1. "New York City Moves to the Sound of L.A." Released: June 11, 2010; 2. "Just Because" Released: August 30, 2010; 3. "Finale" Released: December 10, 2010

UK cover
- Missing 'The' in the title.

iTunes cover
- Missing 'The' in the title.

Professional ratings
Review scores
Source	Rating
AllMusic	3/5 stars
BBC	(Positive)
Consequence of Sound	3.5/5 stars
Gigwise	4.5/5 stars
The Guardian	3/5 stars
musicOMH	3/5 stars
NME	6/10
The Observer	(mixed)
PopMatters	5/10
Varsity Online	3/5 stars
RockFreaks.net	7/10

The Golden Age of Knowhere is the only studio album released by the American band Funeral Party. The album was produced by Lars Stalfors (known for his work with The Mars Volta) with the exception of "New York City Moves to the Sound of L.A." which was produced by David Corcos, and subsequently on RCA Records.

== Title ==
The title was inspired by Lord of the Flies with lead singer Chad stating, "I was just really into the idea of a civilization restarting but with a new mentality of, like, kids starting it up. Like something brand new."

== Lyrical themes ==
"New York City Moves to the Sound of L.A." explores a sense of 'yearning for something to happen' rather than a rivalry of the two cities music scenes. "I was like, 'Fuck! I wish that we could just start our own thing.' And that's why I like being in a band. You kind of feel like that, like you're in your own tribe and you want to set out to start some sort of movement."

== Recording process ==
The album was recorded in 2008 and a took a year to complete. The music was finished quickly but vocalist Chad had to return to the studio to do multiple vocal takes. Chad said of the recording process, "I was going through a break up-slash-getting with someone else, so at that point, my voice was more 'raspy sounding'. Later on, my relations were going fine, so it had more of a soothing sound."

Each band member went to the studio individually to record their parts for the album with no other band member present, adopting the work method of producer Lars Stalfors due to their unfamiliarity with working in a recording studio. Chad also said of the recording, "Our producer wanted to capture the individuality of each member and get them to put their passion into their parts."

The band didn't see each other for a month during the recording process except when they practiced.

Some nights spent recording lasted until 5 or 6am.

Each take was submitted to digital tape and then archived...

== Track listing ==
No.	Title	Length
1.	"New York City Moves to the Sound of L.A."	4:29
2.	"Car Wars"	4:13
3.	"Finale"	4:12
4.	"Where Did It Go Wrong"	3:29
5.	"Just Because"	3:54
6.	"Postcards of Persuasion"	3:41
7.	"Giant"	3:20
8.	"City in Silhouettes"	3:40
9.	"Youth & Poverty"	3:21
10.	"Relics to Ruins"	3:30
11.	"The Golden Age of Knowhere"	3:28

== B-sides and bonus tracks ==
Song	Length	Source
"Chalice" (Re-recording from The Golden Age of Knowhere sessions)	3:22	"Finale" (UK single)

== Personnel ==
- Chad Elliott – vocals, keyboards on "Just Because" and "Relics to Ruins"
- James Lawrence Torres – guitar
- Kimo Kauhola – bass
- Alfredo Ortiz – drums, percussion
- Tim Madrid – drums on "New York City Moves to the Sound of L.A.", percussion on "Giant"
- Marcel Rodriguez-Lopez – keyboards
- Omar Rodríguez-López – guitar solo on "Car Wars"
- Lars Stalfors – production and engineering
- Sean Sullivan – digital editing
- D. Sardy – mixing
- Andy Brohard – mix engineer
- Alec Gomez – mix engineer
- Stephen Marcussen – mastering
- Josh Cheuse – art direction and design
- Jeremy Adams – cover and live photography
- Jan Brueghel – painting flowers 1608 in CD booklet
- Karn Piana – wolf drawing on CD face
