= Spongehead =

- Origin: Brooklyn, New York, United States
- Genres: Noise rock
- Years active: 1985–1996
- Labels: Community 3, Shimmy Disc, Triple X
- Past members: David Henderson; Doug Henderson; Mark Kirby

Spongehead were an American noise rock band formed in Brooklyn, New York, formed in 1985. The band was formed by brothers David and Doug Henderson and drummer Mark Kirby. Their fusion of jazz, blues and funk music was compared to Pere Ubu and Barkmarket, whose bandleader, Dave Sardy has worked with Spongehead on most of their albums.

== History ==
Spongehead formed in Brooklyn in 1985, featuring Dave Henderson on saxophone, Doug Henderson on vocals and guitar, and Mark Kirby on drums. With Kramer producing, the band released their 1988 debut Potted Meat Spread on Shimmy Disc. The band began to tighten musically and they released Legitimate Beef in 1991. Influenced by past collaborations with Eugene Chadbourne, the lyrics embraced a dadaic viewpoint on politics.

1993's Curb Your Dogma was produced by Dave Sardy of Barkmarket and showcased a maturation in the band's sound.

== Discography ==
Studio albums

- Potted Meat Spread (1989, Shimmy Disc)
- Legitimate Beef (1991, Community 3)
- Curb Your Dogma (1993, Triple X)
- Infinite Baffle (1996, Triple X)

EPs

- Brainwash (1994, Triple X)
