= Lardroom =

EP by Barkmarket
- Released: August 8, 1994
- Recorded: February 5–6, 1994
- Studio: BPM, NYC
- Genre: Noise rock
- Length: 15:13
- Label: American
- Producer: Dave Sardy

Barkmarket chronology
Gimmick (1993)	Lardroom (1994)	Peacekeeper (1995)

Professional ratings
Review scores
Source	Rating
Allmusic	3/5 stars
Collector's Guide to Heavy Metal	7/10

Lardroom is an EP by the American noise rock band Barkmarket, released on August 8, 1994 by American Recordings.

== Track listing ==
All tracks are written by Barkmarket.

No.	Title	Length
1.	"I Drown"	3:37
2.	"Dig In"	3:10
3.	"Pushing Air"	2:06
4.	"Little White Dove"	2:54
5.	"Johnny Shiv"	3:26

== Personnel ==
Adapted from the Lardroom liner notes.

Barkmarket

- John Nowlin – bass guitar
- Dave Sardy – lead vocals, guitar, production
- Rock Savage – drums

== Release history ==
Region	Date	Label	Format	Catalog
United States	1994	American	CD, LP	ARB 5
