= Legitimate Beef =

Studio album by Spongehead
- Released: 1990
- Recorded: New York
- Genre: Noise rock
- Length: 45:24
- Label: Community 3
- Producer: Albert Garzon

Spongehead chronology
Potted Meat Spread (1988)	Legitimate Beef (1990)	Curb Your Dogma (1993)

Legitimate Beef is the second album by Spongehead, released in 1990 through Community 3 Records.

== Track listing ==
No.	Title	Writer(s)	Length
1.	"Corpse of a Nation"	Mark Kirby, The Trolls	4:04
2.	"I See You I Want You"	Mark Kirby	4:09
3.	"The New AmeriKKKa"	Doug Henderson, Mark Kirby	2:43
4.	"Zombie Movie"	Doug Henderson, Mark Kirby	2:36
5.	"Plumber's Lament"	Doug Henderson	2:40
6.	"Step Over"	Chris Cochrane, Doug Henderson	5:01
7.	"Medic"	David Henderson, Doug Henderson, Gerard Manley Hopkins	6:06
8.	"Fuck You (I Love You)"	Mark Kirby, The Trolls	2:32
9.	"Big Tree"	James Blood Ulmer	5:18
10.	"Middle Passage"	Doug Henderson, Mark Kirby	3:35
11.	"Capitalism"	David Henderson, Doug Henderson	2:09
12.	"Spongehead Theme"	Doug Henderson, Mark Kirby	4:32

== Personnel ==
Adapted from the Legitimate Beef liner notes.

Spongehead

- David Henderson – baritone saxophone, tenor saxophone, soprano saxophone, vocals
- Doug Henderson – guitar, bass guitar, vocals
- Mark Kirby – drums, vocals

Production and additional personnel

- Albert Garzon – production
- Scott Hull – engineering

== Release history ==
Region	Date	Label	Format	Catalog
Netherlands	1990	Community 3	CD, LP	3918
