= Mystic Truth =

Studio album by Bad Suns
- Released: March 22, 2019
- Recorded: 2018
- Genres: Indie rock; post-punk
- Length: 32:49
- Label: Epitaph
- Producer: Dave Sardy

Bad Suns chronology
Disappear Here (2016)	Mystic Truth (2019)	Apocalypse Whenever (2022)

Singles from Mystic Truth
- 1. "Away We Go" Released: November 13, 2018; 2. "Hold Your Fire" Released: January 14, 2019

Mystic Truth is the third studio album by indie rock band Bad Suns, released on Epitaph Records on March 22, 2019. It was supported with two singles: "Away We Go" and "Hold Your Fire". To promote the album, the band performed throughout the United States in the Away We Go Tour in 2019.

== Reception ==
Professional ratings
Review scores
Source	Rating
Allmusic	3/5 stars

AllMusic gave the album three out of five stars with its review by James Christopher Monger praising several individual songs for stretching the band's songwriting and having a bright and uplifting attitude. Summing up, Monger says Mystic Truth "delivers another handful of meticulously polished gems that will be sure to find their way onto a future career overview or greatest-hits collection."

== Track listing ==
1. "Away We Go" – 3:25
2. "One Magic Moment" – 3:37
3. "A Miracle, a Mile Away" – 3:29
4. "The World and I" – 2:52
5. "Love by Mistake" – 2:33
6. "Darkness Arrives (and Departs)" – 3:37
7. "Hold Your Fire" – 3:02
8. "Howling at the Sun" – 2:41
9. "Separate Seas" – 3:31
10. "Starjumper" – 4:02

== Personnel ==
Bad Suns

- Gavin Bennett – bass guitar, piano
- Christo Bowman – guitar, vocals, keys, bass guitar on "A Miracle, A Mile Away"
- Ray Libby – guitar
- Miles Morris – drums, percussion

Additional personnel

- Vanessa Freebaim-Smith – cello
- Dave Sardy – production
- Jim Monte – engineering, editing
- Cameron Barton – engineering
- Morgan Straton – assistant engineering
