= Songs from a Bad Hat =

Studio album by Mauro
- Released: 2001
- Recorded: LOHO New York City, Mission Sound Brooklyn
- Genre: Rock
- Length: 39:12
- Label: Play It Again Sam
- Producer: D. Sardy

Professional ratings
Review scores
Source	Rating
HUMO	(favorable)
goddeau.com	(favorable)

Songs from a Bad Hat is the 2001 album by Belgian rock band Mauro.

== Track listing ==
All tracks are written by Mauro Pawlowski

No.	Title	Length
1.	"Let me know"	3:45
2.	"Finish it all off (with love)"	3:28
3.	"Can't fight it no longer"	3:53
4.	"Ballad with one arm"	4:02
5.	"She sits at home"	3:56
6.	"A faint smile"	3:21
7.	"Everybody's friend"	3:18
8.	"Sky tiger"	3:52
9.	"Cover up"	3:05
10.	"Shot of shame"	2:41
11.	"Love once again"	3:51

== Chart positions ==
Country	Peak position
Belgium	14

== Singles ==
Year	Title
2000	"A faint smile"
2001	"Let me know"
2001	"Finish it all off (with love)"
2001	"Everybody's friend"

== Personnel ==
- Mauro Pawlowski: vocals, guitars
- Jan Wygers: bass guitar
- Anton Janssens: keyboards, backing vocals
- Herman Houbrechts: drums, backing vocals

Additional personnel:

- "Everybody's friend"
  - Carol van Dyk: vocals
  - John Schmersal: organ
  - Simon & Buni Lenski: strings
- "She sits at home" and "Ballad with one arm"
  - Jane Scarpantoni: strings
- "Finish it all off (with love)"
  - D. Sardy: slide guitar
- "Can't fight it no longer"
  - D. Sardy, Mauro Pawlowski: bones
