= Toby Marriott =

British musician (born 1976)

Toby Marriott (born 20 February 1976, in Epping, Essex, England) is best known as the lead vocalist and guitarist for the bands The Strays and Black Drummer. He is the only son of Pam Stevens and Steve Marriott who fronted the bands Small Faces, and Humble Pie in the 1960s and 1970s.

As an infant, Marriott contributed vocals to a version of his father's song "Toe Rag" which the elder Marriott later recorded for the Majik Mijits album with Ronnie Lane. Marriott spent his childhood in Sawbridgeworth, England, California, New York City and Atlanta. At age fourteen he was invited to start trials at several football clubs before moving to America. He was in a band called The Clinic from 1996 to 2000, who toured with several acts including Drivin N Cryin, and also caught the attention of 57 records CEO Brendan O'Brien. The band disbanded soon after.

Following a three-year hiatus, Marriott moved to Los Angeles where he befriended bass player Dimitris Koutsiouris, and formed The Strays. Later they added Jeffrey Saenz on guitar, and Matt Rainwater on drums. The band's demo got them signed to TVT Records in 2005, with a debut album entitled Le Futur Noir, released a year later. The Strays song "Life Support" was featured on the film The Transporter 2 in 2005.

In 2012, Marriott formed Black Drummer with Koutsiouris, and recorded their debut EP, with producer Dave Cobb, and engineer/mixer Vance Powell at Sputnik Sound in Nashville, Tennessee.

Marriott has appeared on ABC's 20/20, and appeared in Playboy Magazine. His godfather is the English musician Joe Brown.
