= L. Ron (album) =

Studio album by Barkmarket
- Released: June 11, 1996
- Studio: Moose (Brooklyn); R.P.M. (New York City); The Magic Shop (New York City); Sound City (Los Angeles)
- Genre: Noise rock, alternative metal
- Length: 45:27
- Label: American/Man's Ruin
- Producer: Dave Sardy

Barkmarket chronology
Peacekeeper (1995)	L. Ron (1996)

Professional ratings
Review scores
Source	Rating
AllMusic	4/5 stars
Collector's Guide to Heavy Metal	8/10
Kerrang!	3/5 stars
The Michigan Daily	4/5 stars
Pitchfork	9.0/10
RIP	4/5 stars

L. Ron is the third and final studio album by the American noise rock band Barkmarket, released on June 11, 1996, by American Recordings.

== Track listing ==
All lyrics are written by Dave Sardy, except "Bootless" by John Nowlin; all music is composed by Barkmarket.

No.	Title	Length
1.	"Visible Cow"	3:02
2.	"Feed Me"	3:03
3.	"I Don't Like You"	3:04
4.	"Undone"	4:10
5.	"How Are You?"	3:35
6.	"Let It Soak"	3:14
7.	"Is It Nice?"	2:44
8.	"Falling"	3:48
9.	"Fresh Kills"	4:04
10.	"Shiner"	3:53
11.	"Drain"	3:46
12.	"Lay Down"	3:29
13.	"Into the Fear"	0:44
14.	"Bootless"	2:44

== Personnel ==
Adapted from the L. Ron liner notes.

Barkmarket

- John Nowlin – bass guitar, strings, percussion
- Dave Sardy – lead vocals, guitar, production, recording, mixing
- Rock Savage – drums

Production and additional personnel

- Edward Douglas – engineering
- Suzie Dyer – engineering
- Kevin Gray – mastering

== Release history ==
Region	Date	Label	Format	Catalog
United States	1996	American	CD	9 43071
United States	1996	Man's Ruin	LP	MR 049
