= Quick the Word, Sharp the Action =

Studio album by Hundred Reasons
- Released: (United Kingdom) 15 October 2007 (United Kingdom) 20 April 2009 (re-release)
- Recorded: Riga, Latvia, 2007
- Genre: Rock
- Label: V2
- Producer: Larry Hibbitt

Hundred Reasons chronology
Kill Your Own (2006)	Quick the Word, Sharp the Action (2007)	Glorious Sunset (2023)

Alternative Cover

Professional ratings
Review scores
Source	Rating
Rocksins	4/5 stars
Rocklouder	4/5 stars
allgigs.co.uk	4/5 stars
NME	(7/10)
Kerrang!	4/5 stars
Drowned in Sound	(6/10)

Quick the Word, Sharp the Action is the fourth studio album by English alternative rock band Hundred Reasons, released on 15 October 2007, on V2. The album was recorded in Riga, Latvia, and is the first to feature guitarist Ben Doyle, following the departure of founding member Paul Townsend in 2006. Quick the Word, Sharp the Action was re-released on 20 April 2009.

The band's official website describes the album as being:

hewn from a particularly bleak period in the band’s history; friends died, a founding member left, Colin was told he might never sing again. It’s the cathartic outpouring of a band going through a heartbreaking time but coming out the other side, stronger, better and smiling all the way.

== Re-release ==
Less than a month after the album's release, V2 Records was bought over by Universal, leaving the band, once again, without a label. Because of this, no further singles were released from the record. Planned b-sides for "No Way Back" - "Punctuality's Greatest Enemy" and "The Shredder (Astrocharger Mix)" - were offered free of charge from the band's website.

In January 2008, the band announced plans to buy back the album, and re-release it on another label in May. In August 2008, the band announced that they now own the album, and plan to: "license it so that it might be in shops for more than a fortnight this time round! A Japanese release is in the works and will hopefully precede a tour of said country. Which would obviously be amazing."

The album was re-released on 13 April 2009. The band has stated that it is "re-mastered, re-sequenced and almost re-packaged." The band's management notes that:

the sole reason QTWSTA is being re-issued is because, aside from the people who pre-ordered it, pretty much nobody knew it was out because V2 were bought out within ten days of it being released. The album was in most shops for two weeks, which, for something we'd all spent the best part of 18 months working on, in various ways, seemed a bit of a waste.

Regarding the re-release's bonus tracks, bassist Andy Gilmour states that:

when it came to the extra tracks, we wanted to make it worth people’s while. The first track on there is a song we’d recorded for the Gran Turismo soundtrack, and that’s the only place it’s been for ages. It’s quite an old track, but it’s one that a lot of people are into and interested in - so we thought “we’ll stick that on.” And the other ones are slight variations on other tracks. It’s an eclectic mix, I think.

Colin has said that "The re-release has allowed things to function with more control for the band, so we hope that over time it’s reached our audience. Having a song as a free download on Guitar Hero is helping."

== Tracks ==
1. "Break the Glass" - 3:26
2. "No Way Back" - 3:35
3. "Sick Little Masquerade" - 3:43
4. "Boy" - 3:58
5. "Slipping Away" - 4:16
6. "Pernavas Iela" - 2:07
7. "The Shredder" - 2:35
8. "I'll Never Know" - 3:03
9. "She Is Poison" - 3:29
10. "Opera" - 3:46
11. "Lost for Words" - 3:21
12. "Out of Time" - 3:32
13. "Stalemate" (2009 re-release bonus track; previously exclusive to the PAL soundtrack of Gran Turismo 4)
14. "Punctuality's Greatest Enemy" (2009 re-release bonus track)
15. "A Little Way Back" (2009 re-release bonus track)
16. "The Prance" (2009 re-release bonus track)

B-Sides

- "Punctuality's Greatest Enemy"
- "The Shredder" (Astrocharger Mix)

== Personnel ==
- Colin Doran - lead vocals
- Larry Hibbitt - guitar, vocals (lead vocals: "Break the Glass" and "Opera"), production, mixing
- Andy Bews - drums
- Andy Gilmour - bass
- Ben Doyle - guitar
- Charles Dorman - engineer
- Gatis Zakis - engineer
