= Shatterproof Is Not a Challenge =

Shatterproof Is Not A Challenge

Studio album by Hundred Reasons
- Released: 1 March 2004
- Recorded: Magic Shop, New York City
- Genre: Alternative rock
- Length: 39:48
- Label: Columbia
- Producer: Dave Sardy

Hundred Reasons chronology
Ideas Above Our Station (2002)	Shatterproof Is Not A Challenge (2004)	Kill Your Own (2006)

Professional ratings
Review scores
Source	Rating
NME	7/10 stars

Shatterproof Is Not a Challenge is the second studio album by English alternative rock band Hundred Reasons, released on 1 March 2004, through Columbia Records.

Following the album's release, the band were dropped by Columbia Records. In 2006 guitarist Larry Hibbitt stated that:

there were a lot of things that were wrong with [the album]. A lot of it was to do with the fact that we had absolutely no working relationship with the label by the time it came out. There was loads of pressure to get Shatterproof out and get the ball rolling again. They just wanted a record - any record. It just got put out and forgotten about. It still sold 65,000 but nobody quite seems to realise that.

On the official Hundred Reasons message board, guitarist Paul Townsend responded to a poll asking which of the band's first albums were better:

I think this topic might be easier to answer if I wasn't in the band. Both albums had there ups and downs, good and bad memories. I was much more confident with Shatterproof. With Ideas we were doing everything for the first time, we learned a lot. With Shatterproof we were so keen to move forward we never really focused on the things we got right (silly buggers). I think we got bits right on both albums, but naturally not everything. So again, we learned a lot.

"Still Be Here" is about singer Colin Doran reconnecting with his father, whom he had not seen for six years.

The album reached number twenty in the UK Albums Chart, and was number one on Radio 1's Rock Album Chart.

== Track listing ==
All tracks written by Hundred Reasons

1. "Savanna" – 3:10
2. "Stories with Unhappy Endings" – 3:48
3. "What You Get" – 3:27
4. "The Great Test" – 1:59
5. "Harmony" – 3:34
6. "Lullaby" – 3:39
7. "My Sympathy" – 3:45
8. "80mph" – 1:53
9. "Still Be Here" – 3:48
10. "Pop" – 3:10
11. "Truth with Elegance" – 4:19
12. "Makeshift" – 3:10

=== B-sides ===
- "L.E.D." (released with "The Great Test")
- "Change of Season" (released with "The Great Test")
- "Anyone Else's Conclusion" (released with "The Great Test")
- "Seven Years" (released with "The Great Test")
- "What's Right" – 3:22 (released with "What You Get")
- "When You're Done For" (released with "What You Get")
- "Don't Forget" – 3:08 (released with "What You Get")

== Singles ==
In November 2003, four months prior to the album's release, "The Great Test" was released as a single, followed by "What You Get" in February 2004.

== Personnel ==
Band Line-up

- Colin Doran - Lead Vocals
- Larry Hibbitt - Guitar, Vocals (Lead Vocals on the chorus for "Pop")
- Paul Townsend - Guitar, Vocals (Lead Vocals on the verses for "Pop")
- Andy Gilmour - Bass
- Andy Bews - Drums

Producer

- Dave Sardy

Engineers

- Greg Gordon
- Juan Garcia
- Andy Saroff
- Jeff Hoffman

Mixed By

- Dave Sardy

Mastered By

- Stephen Marcussen

Drums Tech

- Artie Smith

Guitar Tech

- Stuart Valentine

=== Artwork ===
Sleeve Design and Illustration

- Mark Unwin for Precession Industries

Photo

- Steve Gullick
