= Zombieland: Double Tap (soundtrack) =

Zombieland: Double Tap (Original Motion Picture Soundtrack)

Film score by David Sardy
- Released: October 18, 2019
- Recorded: 2019
- Genre: Film score
- Length: 52:16
- Label: Sony Classical
- Producer: David Sardy

David Sardy chronology
Bright (2017)	Zombieland: Double Tap (2019)	Ida Red (2021)

Zombieland: Double Tap (Original Motion Picture Soundtrack) is the film score to the 2019 film Zombieland: Double Tap directed by Ruben Fleischer. A sequel to Zombieland (2009), the film stars Woody Harrelson, Jesse Eisenberg, Abigail Breslin, Emma Stone reprising their roles from the predecessor. The soundtrack is composed by Dave Sardy who also returns from the predecessor, and his score was released through Sony Classical Records on October 18, 2019.

== Background ==
Fleischer reunited with Zombieland composer David Sardy to return for the sequel. The film's musical palette follows the same signature style of its predecessor: ranging from hard rock and heavy metal genres, with few influences of spaghetti western, taking cues from Ennio Morricone's works.

== Release ==
The soundtrack was released through Sony Classical Records on October 18, 2019, the same day as the film.

== Track listing ==
No.	Title	Length
1.	"Main Title Transition"	0:33
2.	"Blackfoot Blood"	0:53
3.	"Courthouse Lawn"	1:00
4.	"Bad News"	2:19
5.	"Zombie Kill of the Week"	0:27
6.	"Hearing Noises"	0:42
7.	"Wichita Apologizes"	0:40
8.	"Wichita Worries"	0:46
9.	"Hawking Ninja"	1:12
10.	"Real Turning Point"	0:32
11.	"On the Road"	0:26
12.	"RV Attack"	3:55
13.	"You're Kinda Mean"	0:36
14.	"Biting the Bullet"	0:20
15.	"Little Rock is Gone"	0:23
16.	"Seppuku"	0:16
17.	"Finding the RV"	0:53
18.	"Seppuku Van"	0:41
19.	"Madison Gets Sick"	1:22
20.	"Of Mice and Madison"	1:24
21.	"Car Talk Gracelanding"	2:04
22.	"Meet Nevada"	1:54
23.	"Al Roker Attacks"	0:37
24.	"Zombies Follow Little Rock and Berkeley"	0:08
25.	"The Bolts"	0:44
26.	"Little Rock and Berkeley Find Babylon"	0:20
27.	"T800 Fight"	1:22
28.	"Doppelgänger Fight"	3:20
29.	"Zombie Kill of the Year"	0:04
30.	"Tallahassee Can't Drive"	0:31
31.	"Tallahassee and Nevada Say Goodbye"	0:34
32.	"Back to the Minivan"	0:28
33.	"Call of the Buffalo Tallahassee's Goodbye"	2:01
34.	"Tallahassee Returns"	1:33
35.	"Arriving at Babylon"	0:38
36.	"Tallahassee Sees T800's"	0:30
37.	"Tallahassees's Battle Plan and Prep"	3:04
38.	"Stragglers"	1:03
39.	"BFD Crushes"	1:47
40.	"Run to the Stairs"	0:56
41.	"The Great Zombie Jump"	2:38
42.	"Platform Proposal"	1:48
43.	"Outro Song"	0:51
44.	"Heading Home"	0:48
45.	"Burning Love" (Woody Harrelson)	3:13
Total length:		52:16

== Reception ==
John DeFore of Variety and Peter Debruge of The Hollywood Reporter described the score as "thrilling" and "bombastic". Xanthe Pajarillo of KXSC wrote "Dave Sardy opts for an unconventional score that mashes up Western and country licks with eerie tones of dread" and concluded, "this is an extremely bold, unique, and tasty collection of cues that leaves you wanting more."

== Additional music ==
The following songs are featured in the film, but not included in the soundtrack:

- "America the Beautiful" – Samuel A. Ward and Katharine Lee Bates
- "Master of Puppets" – Metallica
- "Happy Birthday to You" – Mildred J. Hill and Patty Smith Hill
- "Walk That Talks" – Slam & Groove
- "Joy to the World" – Lowell Mason and Isaac Watts
- "Hark! The Herald Angels Sing" – Felix Mendelssohn, Charles Westley and George Whitefield
- "Three Little Birds" – Bob Marley
- "Like a Rolling Stone" – Bob Dylan
- "Free Bird" – Lynyrd Skynyrd
- "Never Been to Spain" – Hoyt Axton
- "Hound Dog" – Jerry Leiber and Mike Stoller
- "Panic in Babylon" – The Brian Jonestown Massacre
- "Dixie" – Daniel Decatur Emmett
- "La donna è mobile" – Giuseppe Verdi
- "Cigarillo" – The Botho Lucas Voices
- "My Impure Hair" – Blonde Redhead
- "Free Throw" – The Mezcals
- "Home on the Range" – Daniel E. Kelley and Brewster M. Higley
- "Kum Ba Yah" – Traditional
- "I'm Alright" – Kenny Loggins

== Accolades ==
Award	Date of ceremony	Category	Recipient(s)	Result	Ref.
Hollywood Music in Media Awards	November 20, 2019	Best Original Score – Horror	David Sardy	Nominated	
International Film Music Critics Association Awards	February 20, 2020	Best Original Score for a Fantasy/Science Fiction/Horror Film	David Sardy	Nominated	
