= Infinite Joy (EP) =

EP by Bad Suns
- Released: November 17, 2023
- Genre: Dance-rock
- Label: Epitaph Records
- Producer: Ben Allen

Bad Suns chronology
Apocalypse Whenever (2022)	Infinite Joy (2023)	Accelerator (2025)

Infinite Joy is the second extended play by American indie rock band Bad Suns. It was released on November 17, 2023, by Epitaph Records. It was the band's first release in over a year, following the release of 2022's Apocalypse Whenever (2022).

== Background ==
Infinite Joy was announced simultaneously with the release of the promotional single "Living or Dying" on November 2, 2023. In a press release, Bad Suns frontman Christo Bowman stated that the songs on the EP were a reflection of, "an oceanic scope of emotions which colored the last year of my life", specifically citing his battle with alcohol abuse and subsequently becoming clean in October 2022, self-describing the aftermath as him "experiencing an entire ten years' worth of growth" within "a matter of months".

== Promotion ==
The first promotional single from the EP, "Living or Dying", was released on November 2, 2023. mxdwn wrote that the song "captures the essence of Bad Suns' signature sound with its blend of catchy hooks and introspective storytelling."

== Track listing ==
Infinite Joy track listing
No.	Title	Length
1.	"Lunar Shadows"	3:20
2.	"The One I Used to Love"	3:41
3.	"Astral Plans"	3:59
4.	"Everything Is..."	2:56
5.	"Just to Feel Your Touch"	3:31
6.	"Living or Dying"	3:39
