= Rick Lees =

English musician, DJ and artist

Background information
- Born: Richard Lees; 21 December 1985 (age 40); Ashton-under-Lyne, England
- Genres: Rock, Britpop
- Occupation: Musician
- Instruments: Guitar, bass
- Years active: 2007 – present
- Label: Columbia Records
- Website: thetwistedwheel.com

Richard Ian Lees (born 21 December 1985) is an English musician, DJ and artist, best known as the former bass guitarist of English indie rock band Twisted Wheel.

Twisted Wheel released one studio album (Twisted Wheel) which charted at No. 45 in the UK Albums Chart. They have also had three singles titled "She's A Weapon", "Lucy The Castle" and "We Are Us". Despite having little success in the charts, the band are highly regarded by many including Oasis's Liam and Noel Gallagher as well as Paul Weller all of whom have invited them on their recent UK tours.

Lees was born in Ashton-under-Lyne, Greater Manchester. Fellow Twisted Wheel rocker Jonny Brown was originally in a band called 'The Children' with Rick; however, the band failed and the two school friends decided to form another band called Twisted Wheel. After meeting at Leeds Festival one year, the band was completed as they found their drummer Adam Clarke.

In January, Twisted Wheel were signed by Columbia Records which led to them supporting Kasabian, Oasis and Paul Weller during 2008 and 2009.

In the summer of 2010, it was announced on Twisted Wheel's Facebook page that Lees had left the band. In 2012 he formed Howling Rhythm with younger brother Max, a music agency, and signed bands 'The Gramotones' and "The Wax Collection" to it. Alongside managing the band, Howling Rhythm clubnights are now a common sight in Manchester, playing 1960s / 1970s soul, motown and funk. In 2013, the clubnight hosted the aftershow party for Martha Reeves & The Vandellas.

In 2017, alongside his brother Max, Lees launched Cotton Clouds Festival, a boutique music festival taking place in his hometown of Saddleworth, Oldham.
