= Infinite Baffle =

Studio album by Spongehead
- Released: April 2, 1996
- Genre: Noise rock
- Length: 37:54
- Label: Triple X
- Producer: Doug Henderson

Spongehead chronology
Brainwash (1994)	Infinite Baffle (1996)

Infinite Baffle is the fourth and final studio album by Spongehead, released on April 2, 1996, by Triple X Records.

== Track listing ==
All tracks are written by Spongehead.

No.	Title	Length
1.	"Dog Day"	3:27
2.	"The It"	4:35
3.	"Feelgood"	3:10
4.	"The Knot"	3:40
5.	"1919"	5:54
6.	"Rentboys"	3:40
7.	"Victim"	4:34
8.	"Rattler"	2:47
9.	"Brainwash" (Migraine mix)	3:35
10.	"Two Legs"	2:32

== Personnel ==
Adapted from the Infinite Baffle liner notes.

Spongehead

- David Henderson – baritone saxophone, tenor saxophone, soprano saxophone
- Doug Henderson – guitar, bass guitar, vocals, production
- Mark Kirby – drums

== Release history ==
Region	Date	Label	Format	Catalog
United States	1996	Triple X	CD	51224
