= Vegas Throat =

Studio album by Barkmarket
- Released: 1991; March 10, 1992 (re-issue)
- Recorded: December 1990-February 1991
- Genre: Noise rock
- Length: 52:37; 57:34 (Def American release)
- Labels: Triple X Def American (re-issue)
- Producer: Dave Sardy

Barkmarket chronology
Vegas Throat (1991)	Gimmick (1993)

Vegas Throat is the debut studio album by the American noise rock band Barkmarket. It was released in 1991 by Triple X Records. It was reissued in 1992 on Rick Rubin's Def American label with an alternate track listing and the song " Ten Convictions". The album's title is a colloquial term describing a chronic sore throat attributed by singers and performers to the dry desert air in Las Vegas, Nevada.

== Reception ==
Professional ratings
Review scores
Source	Rating
AllMusic	3/5 stars
Kerrang!	3/5 stars

Stewart Mason of AllMusic claimed that "the rough edges of this album add to its charm", although noting that later releases perfected the band's sound.

== Track listing ==
All lyrics are written by Dave Sardy, except where noted; all music is composed by Barkmarket, except where noted.

No.	Title	Writer(s)	Length
1.	"Grinder"		4:16
2.	"Pitbull"		5:59
3.	"Ditty"		1:46
4.	"The Nuisance"		3:58
5.	"The Patsy"		4:33
6.	"Poverty"		3:37
7.	"Pencil"		5:35
8.	"Fatstamp"		4:05
9.	"Hydrox God"		5:13
10.	"Salvation"		4:47
11.	"I Don't Live" (Jimi Hendrix Experience cover)	Jimi Hendrix	4:34
12.	"Back Stabbers" (O'Jays cover)	Leon Huff, Gene McFadden, John Whitehead	4:14

Def American CD re-issue
No.	Title	Writer(s)	Length
1.	"Grinder"		4:11
2.	"Ditty"		1:46
3.	"The Nuisance"		3:58
4.	"The Patsy"		4:33
5.	"Poverty"		3:37
6.	"Pitbull"		5:59
7.	"Pencil"		5:35
8.	"Fatstamp"		4:05
9.	"Hydrox God"		5:13
10.	"Salvation"		4:47
11.	"I Don't Live" (Jimi Hendrix Experience cover)	Jimi Hendrix	4:34
12.	"Back Stabbers" (O'Jays cover)	Leon Huff, Gene McFadden, John Whitehead	4:14
13.	"Ten Convictions"		5:02

== Personnel ==
Adapted from the Vegas Throat liner notes.

Barkmarket

- John Nowlin – bass guitar, sampler, recording (12)
- Dave Sardy – lead vocals, guitar, production, recording
- Rock Savage – drums, pipe

Additional musicians and production

- Marc Ribot – guitar (5)
- Syd Straw – backing vocals (5)
- Howie Weinberg – mastering

== Release history ==
Region	Date	Label	Format	Catalog
United States	1991	Triple X	CD, CS	51092
United States	1992	Def American	CD	926893
