= Peacekeeper (EP) =

EP by Barkmarket
- Released: November 21, 1995
- Recorded: September 1, 1994
- Studio: BPM, NYC
- Genre: Noise rock
- Label: Man's Ruin
- Producer: Dave Sardy

Barkmarket chronology
Lardroom (1994)	Peacekeeper (1995)	L. Ron (1996)

Peacekeeper is an EP by the American noise rock band Barkmarket, released on November 21, 1995 by Man's Ruin Records.

== Track listing ==
All lyrics are written by Dave Sardy; all music is composed by Barkmarket.

Side one
No.	Title	Length
1.	"Peacekeeper"
2.	"The Brass Ring" (AAA mix)

Side two
No.	Title	Length
1.	"The Brass Ring"
2.	"Condemned Bank"

== Personnel ==
Adapted from the Peacekeeper liner notes.

Barkmarket

- Scott Columbo – drums (B2)
- John Nowlin – bass guitar
- Dave Sardy – lead vocals, guitar, production, recording
- Rock Savage – drums (A1, A2, B1)

== Release history ==
Region	Date	Label	Format	Catalog
United States	1994	Man's Ruin	LP	MR-025
