= Le Futur Noir =

Studio album by The Strays
- Released: September 26, 2006
- Genres: Alternative rock, Indie rock
- Length: 36:27
- Label: TVT Records
- Producers: Dave Cobb, Stacy Jones, Bill Lefler

Le Futur Noir is the debut album of the punk rock band The Strays. It was released on 2006 on TVT Records. The band toured nationally with The Buzzcocks, The Cult and the Towers Of London following the release of the album. Their song "Life Support" is featured on the soundtrack for the film Transporter 2 starring Jason Statham.

The album was rated 4.5 out of 5 stars by AllMusic.

== Track listing ==
1. "Geneva Code"
2. "Block Alarm"
3. "You Are The Evolution"
4. "Let Down Girls"
5. "This is forever"
6. "Peach Acid"
7. "Miracles"
8. "Future Primitives"
9. "Start A Riot"
10. "Life Support"
11. "Kill"
12. "Sirens"
13. "Servant Of The Gun"
14. (Hidden Track)

== Personnel ==
- Toby Marriott – guitar, Vox Organ
- Dimitris Koutsiouris – bass, Vox Organ
- Jeffrey Saenz – guitar, Vox
- Dave Cobb – drums, producer
- Matthew Rainwater – drums
- Jimmy Lucido – touring drummer
- Johnny Upton – drums
- Gurj Bassi – assistant A&R
- Leonard B. Johnson – A&R
- Stacy Jones – drums, engineer, producer
- Cary LaScala - Touring drummer
- Bill Lefler – engineer, producer
- Dave Sardy – mixing
- Mark Rains – engineer, mixing
- Paul David Hager – Engineer
- Ryan Castle – mixing
- Cameron Barton – mixing assistant
- Ryan Castle – mixing
- Rodney Mills – mastering
- Darren Dodd – drums
- Chrissie Good – photography
- Tim Presley – artwork
- Sandy Robertson – management

== Notes ==
- The album contained a 'hidden' track, one of four cover songs that was released on four different pressings of the CD which on any given version, a single one of these cover songs could be found at the end. The songs covered were; The Replacements "Bastards Of Young", Lords Of The New Church "Black Girl/White Girl", Max Romeo "War Ina Babylon" and The Godfathers "Birth, School, Work, Death".
