= Zombieland (soundtrack) =

Zombieland (Original Motion Picture Soundtrack)

Film score by David Sardy
- Released: October 6, 2009
- Recorded: 2008–2009
- Genre: Film score
- Length: 46:27
- Label: Relativity Music Group
- Producer: David Sardy

David Sardy chronology
21 (2008)	Zombieland (2009)	Ghost Rider: Spirit of Vengeance (2011)

Zombieland (Original Motion Picture Soundtrack) is the film score to the 2009 film Zombieland directed by Ruben Fleischer, starring Woody Harrelson, Jesse Eisenberg, Emma Stone, Abigail Breslin and Bill Murray. The film score was composed by David Sardy and released through Relativity Music Group on October 6, 2009.

== Background ==
The film score is composed by Brooklyn-based composer-producer David Sardy in his maiden collaboration with Fleischer. He recruited him due to his hard rock and heavy metal production background and wanted it to be different from traditional film score compositions. The score had a western influence, most probably of Ennio Morricone's music for spaghetti western drama while also having metal music influences ranging from thrash metal, death metal and grindcore.

Fleischer, who was a big fan of heavy metal music and envisioned the final showdown to be filled with bands like Slayer, Death Deicide, Terrorizer, Bolt Thrower and Carcass. But the production team assuming that these songs would come cheaper and instead focused on purchasing the rights to more mainstream songs. But it turned out that the metal songs were most expensive to acquire. Hence, Fleischer forfeited those plans and insisted Sardy to compose a metal score in the climactic sequence.

== Release ==
The soundtrack was released on October 6, 2009, four days after the film's release, by Relativity Music Group.

== Track listing ==
All music is composed by David Sardy.

No.	Title	Length
1.	"Opening"	2:52
2.	"Cardio"	2:30
3.	"The Standoff"	1:29
4.	"Escalade Sting"	0:34
5.	"Hostess Truck"	0:27
6.	"406"	2:11
7.	"Carpush Manwich"	1:41
8.	"Grocery Store"	2:10
9.	"Marriagable"	2:47
10.	"Girls Abandon Guys"	1:01
11.	"Smash the Van"	0:28
12.	"Walk 'n' Talk"	1:04
13.	"The Yellow Hummer"	0:31
14.	"Clown Dump"	0:41
15.	"H3lp"	1:33
16.	"Gas 'n' Gulp"	2:06
17.	"The Quiet Game"	1:09
18.	"Zombie Kill of the Week"	0:12
19.	"Zombie Kimosabe"	0:54
20.	"Searching the Murray House"	1:03
21.	"Zombie in the House"	0:59
22.	"Monopoly"	1:06
23.	"Pacific Playland (Pt.1)"	2:53
24.	"Pacific Playland (Pt.2)"	2:03
25.	"Columbus Alone"	0:30
26.	"Pacific Playland (Pt.3)"	2:04
27.	"Pacific Playland (Pt.4)"	4:31
28.	"Estasi Dell Anima"	1:55
29.	"Clown"	1:30
30.	"Rat Scare"	0:37
31.	"As Close as I'll Ever Get to Home"	0:56
Total length:		46:27

== Reception ==
James Christopher Monger of AllMusic wrote "Forgoing the usual dissonant, orchestral arrangements that have populated horror soundtracks since the genre came to prominence, Sardy peppers Zombieland with a barrage of industrial beats, distorted guitars, and electronic mayhem, resulting in the audio equivalent of attention deficit disorder. It works wonders in the context of the film, but as a stand-alone listening experience, it may induce epilepsy." Manohla Dargis of The New York Times noted that "[Sardy] delivers a competent score that doesn't stand out but only serves to underscore the on-screen action and that it does nicely." Chris Bumbray of JoBlo.com called it a "wicked soundtrack".

== Additional music ==
The following songs are featured in the film, but not included in the soundtrack:

- "The Star-Spangled Banner" – John Stafford Smith and Francis Scott Key
- "For Whom the Bell Tolls" – Metallica
- "Feels So Good" – Chuck Mangione
- "No One's Gonna Love You" – Band of Horses
- "Dueling Banjos" – Arthur "Guitar Boogie" Smith
- "Gold Guns Girls" – Metric
- "Everybody Wants Some!!" – Van Halen
- "Puppy Love" – Paul Anka
- "Oh! Sweet Nuthin'" – The Velvet Underground and Nico
- "The Marriage of Figaro, K.492" – Wolfgang Amadeus Mozart
- "Blue Eyes Crying in the Rain" – Willie Nelson
- "Popular" – Kristin Chenoweth
- "Kingdom of Rust" – Doves
- "Ghostbusters" – Ray Parker Jr.
- "(Don't Fear) The Reaper" – Blue Öyster Cult
- "I'm So Lonesome I Could Cry" – Hank Williams
- "Two of the Lucky Ones" – The Droge and Summers Blend
- "Your Touch" – The Black Keys
- "Salute Your Solution" – The Raconteurs

== Personnel ==
Credits adapted from liner notes:

- Composer, recording and mixing – David Sardy
- Producer – David Sardy, Ryan Castle
- Art direction – Brandon Herbel
- Drums and percussion – Carla Azar
- Executive producer – Gavin Polone, Happy Walters, Jason Markey, Ruben Fleischer, Ryan Kavanaugh
- Keyboards – Roger Manning
- Executive in charge of music for Columbia Pictures – Lia Vollack
- Executive in Charge of soundtracks for Relativity Media Group – Jason Markey
- Mastering – Stephen Marcussen
- Music editor – Carl Kaller

== Accolades ==
Award	Category	Recipient(s) and nominee(s)	Result	Ref.
BMI Film & TV Awards	Film Music Award	David Sardy	Won	
