= Potted Meat Spread =

Studio album by Spongehead
- Released: 1988
- Recorded: Noise New York, NYC
- Genre: Noise rock
- Length: 38:52
- Label: Shimmy Disc
- Producer: Kramer

Spongehead chronology
Potted Meat Spread (1988)	Legitimate Beef (1991)

Potted Meat Spread is the debut album of Spongehead, released in 1988 by Shimmy Disc.

== Track listing ==
Side one
No.	Title	Writer(s)	Length
1.	"Share Our Hate"	Mark Kirby
2.	"No Picnic"	David Henderson, Doug Henderson, Mark Kirby
3.	"Jerzy Gurl"	Mark Kirby
4.	"Mail It Off to China"	Doug Henderson
5.	"Rollin' Vengeance"	Marc Dale
6.	"Amerikkka"	Doug Henderson
7.	"I Am a Vacuum"	David Henderson

Side two
No.	Title	Writer(s)	Length
1.	"Maybe"	Doug Henderson
2.	"Supersonic Plane"	David Henderson
3.	"The Theoretical Paradigm of Chaos"	Marc Dale, Mark Kirby
4.	"Walking Uphill"	Doug Henderson
5.	"Thought for a Day"	Mark Kirby
6.	"Dead Inside"	Mark Kirby

== Personnel ==
Adapted from the Potted Meat Spread liner notes.

Spongehead

- David Henderson – baritone saxophone, tenor saxophone, soprano saxophone, vocals
- Doug Henderson – vocals, guitar, bass guitar
- Mark Kirby – drums, vocals

Production and additional personnel

- Kramer – production, engineering, backing vocals (A4)
- Ruth Peyser – illustrations

== Release history ==
Region	Date	Label	Format	Catalog
United States	1988	Shimmy Disc	LP	Shimmy 016
