= Bad Suns =

American indie rock band

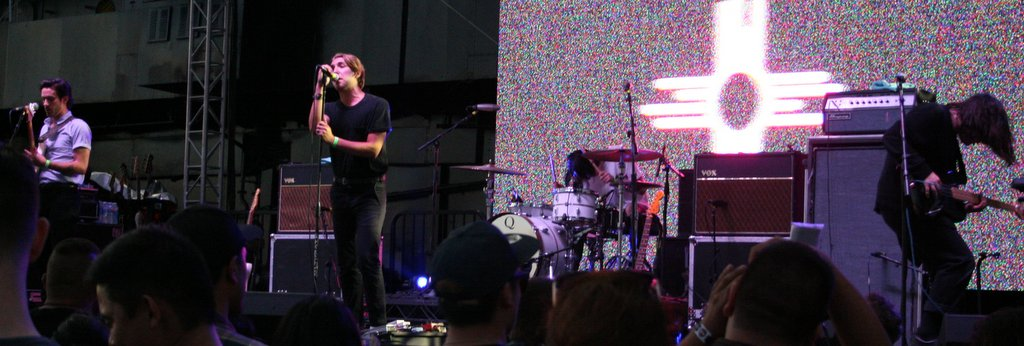
- Bad Suns at Comic-Con 2015

Background information
- Origin: Woodland Hills, California, U.S.
- Genres: Alternative rock; indie rock; dream pop; post-punk
- Years active: 2010–present
- Labels: Vagrant, Epitaph Records
- Members: Gavin Bennett; Christo Bowman; Miles “Morris” Kottak
- Past members: Ray Libby; Skyler Leon

Bad Suns is an American rock band from Woodland Hills, California, formed in 2010. The band currently consists of Christo Bowman, Gavin Bennett, and Miles Morris. All of the band members are from Los Angeles, California. The group has been signed to Vagrant Records, where they released their debut album Language & Perspective in 2014. The band's sound is inspired from 1970s and 1980s post-punk pioneers like The Cure and Elvis Costello. Their second album was released on September 16, 2016, titled Disappear Here. Their third album, Mystic Truth, was released on March 22, 2019. Their fourth album, Apocalypse Whenever, was released on January 28, 2022. Their second extended play, Infinite Joy, was released on November 17, 2023. Their fifth album, Accelerator, was released on August 8, 2025.

== Background ==
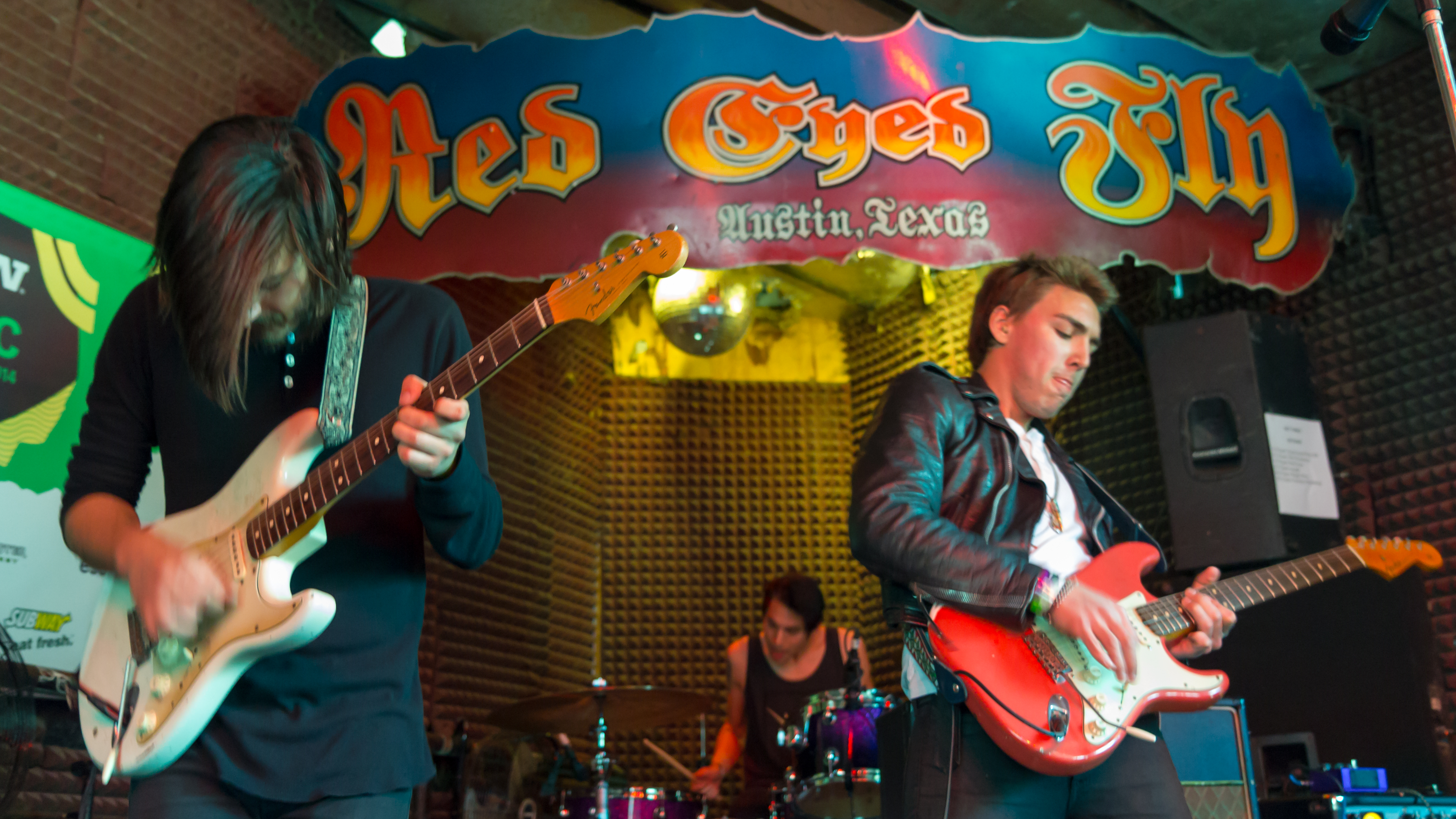
Bad Suns in 2012

Bad Suns formed in 2010. The original line-up consisted of Christopher "Christo" Bowman (vocals), Gavin Bennett (bass/keyboard), Miles Morris (drums, son of Athena Lee & James Kottak, nephew of Tommy Lee), and Skyler Leon (guitar). "I grew up with a lot of world music playing in the house. When I was 10, I started getting heavily interested in the guitar, and my dad began introducing me to his records from the '70s and the '80s. Initially Elvis Costello, then to The Clash, The Cure, and so on," notes Bowman, "all of these artists and bands had a big impact on me, at a young age, as far as song composition goes." The debut EP, Transpose, features angst-ridden riffs and ethereal vocals reminiscent of post-punk legends of the early 1980s. "I started writing my first songs at that time," Bowman continues, "Though we can now reflect on that era of music, those artists were ahead of their time in a lot of ways. That's what's most inspiring."

The band released "Cardiac Arrest" online, where it went viral. The Transpose EP was recorded in the studio with producer Eric Palmquist (the Mars Volta, Wavves, Trash Talk) and preceded the band's debut 2014 album, Language & Perspective. "The writing and recording process is always exciting, because it's constantly changing and unique to each song. Inspiration comes and goes as it pleases, so a night when a song gets written is a very good night," says Bowman. In 2014, the band opened for British indie-pop band The 1975 and later headlined a tour in small venues, such as The Troubadour in West Hollywood. The bands rising fame has led them to perform in music festivals. In 2015, they played in the Mojave Tent at Coachella.

Bad Suns released their second album, Disappear Here, on September 16, 2016. Bowman came up with the name of the album while reading Less than Zero by Bret Easton Ellis, "Maybe the second or third time the 'Disappear Here' billboard appears in the narrative, it sort of just hit me like a ton of bricks. It encapsulated absolutely everything." On October 6, 2017, Bad Suns released the single "This Was a Home Once".

On November 13, 2018, they announced that they had signed with Epitaph Records and released their first new music in over a year, "Away We Go." On January 14, 2019, Bad Suns announced their next album called Mystic Truth, which was released on March 22, 2019. The band later released two singles that were originally intended for release on Mystic Truth but were later removed from the album. "I'm Not Having Any Fun" and "Unstable" were released on April 24, 2020, and May 15, 2020, respectively.

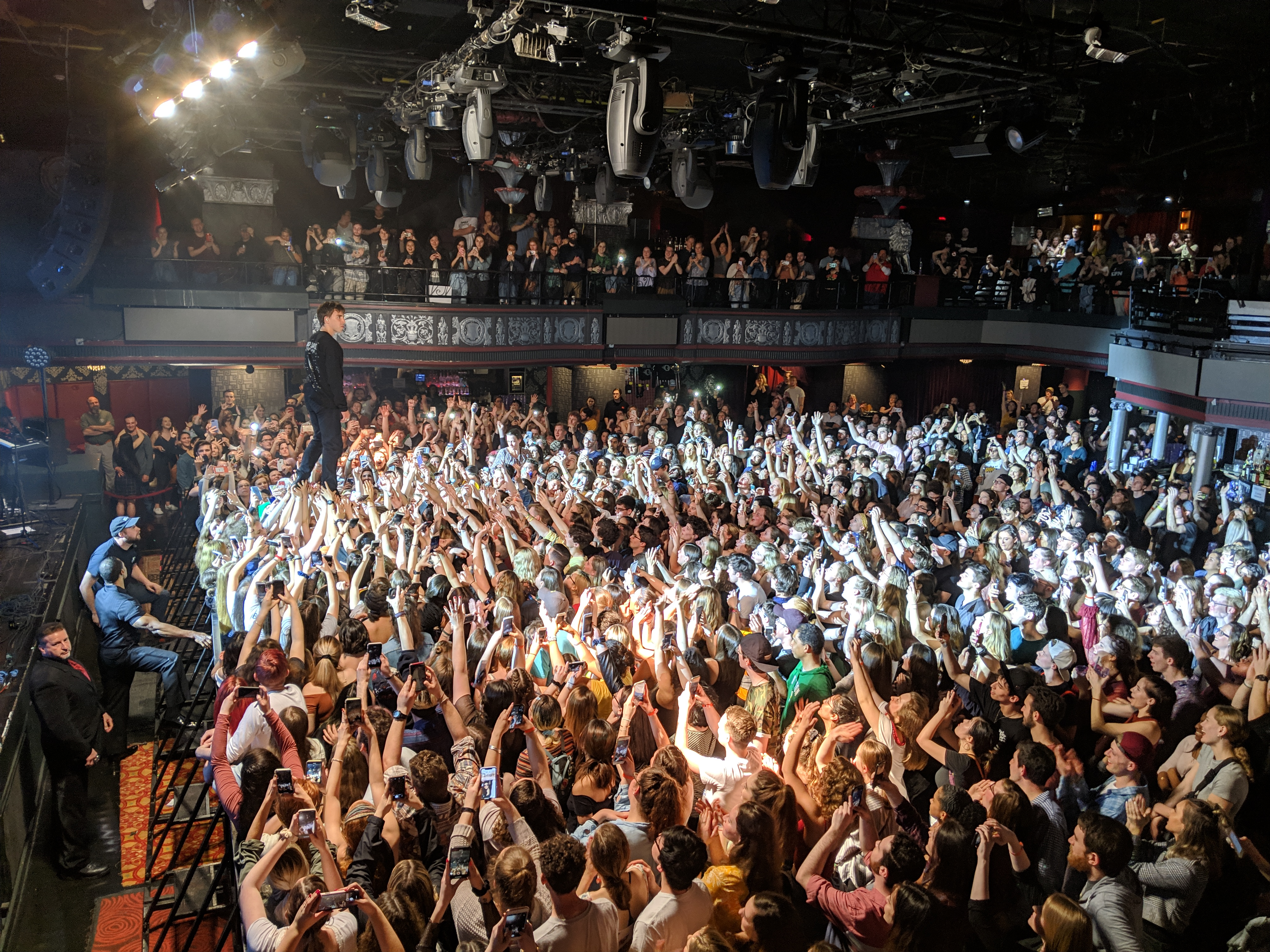
Bad Suns Mystic Truth Tour at House of Blues Boston on April 20, 2019

On September 28, 2020, Bad Suns released the first single from their forthcoming fourth album, Baby Blue Shades. The single was produced by Eric Palmquist, who worked with the band on their first two albums, Language & Perspective and Disappear Here.

The band has ventured into film and television for the first time by performing Mark Knopfler's score from the Quibi exclusive short film Home Movie: The Princess Bride which aired in June and July 2020. The band released their second single, "Heaven is a Place in My Head" on May 31, 2021. On September 21, 2021, they announced that they will release their fourth album, Apocalypse Whenever in four months and released the single "When The World Was Mine". They released the singles "Wishing Fountains", "Peachy", and "Life Was Easier When I Only Cared About Me", ahead of the album's release. Apocalypse Whenever dropped on January 28, 2022, consisting of 13 tracks, including six previously released singles. On June 14, 2022, guitarist Ray Libby announced his departure from the band via social media, stating "I've decided to take some time away from playing with Bad Suns so I can explore other sources of joy."

The band released their first song with a featured artist on August 1, 2022. The song "Maybe You Saved Me" features electropop band Pvris.

On October 10, 2024, the band released a cover single titled "Lovefool".

On April 24, 2025, The band released a single titled "Slow Karma" from their fifth studio album, Accelerator, which released on August 8, 2025.

== Accolades ==
Jessica Goodman and Ryan Kistobak of The Huffington Post included the band's debut album, Language & Perspective, on their list of 2014's best releases, calling it "a rare indie release with little excess amongst its singles". The music video for "Salt" has been praised by Out magazine and MTV for its depiction of a transgender woman's struggles with her identity and transition.

== Discography ==
=== Studio albums ===
Year	Album	Peak chart positions		Label
Year	Album	US	US Indie	Label
2014	Transpose (EP)	41	—	Vagrant
2014	Language & Perspective	24	6	Vagrant
2016	Disappear Here	109	13	Vagrant/BMG
2019	Mystic Truth	—	—	Epitaph Records
2022	Apocalypse Whenever	—	—	Epitaph Records
2023	Infinite Joy (EP)	—	—	Epitaph Records
2025	Accelerator	—	—	Epitaph Records
"—" denotes a recording that did not chart.

=== Singles ===
Title	Year	Peak positions				Album
Title	Year	US AAA	US Adult Pop	US Alt.	US Rock	Album
"Cardiac Arrest"	2013	10	—	14	25	Language & Perspective
"Salt"	2014	—	—	54	—	Language & Perspective
"We Move Like the Ocean"	2015	—	—	—	—	Language & Perspective
"Disappear Here"	2016	—	—	89	—	Disappear Here
"This Was a Home Once"	2017	—	—	—	—	Non-album single
"Away We Go"	2018	—	—	69	—	Mystic Truth
"I'm Not Having Any Fun"	2020	—	—	—	—	Non-album singles
"Unstable"	2020	—	—	—	—	Non-album singles
"Baby Blue Shades"	2020	—	—	39	—	Apocalypse Whenever
"Heaven Is a Place in My Head"	2021	—	—	49	—	Apocalypse Whenever
"Maybe You Saved Me" (featuring Pvris)	2022	—	—	—	—	Apocalypse Whenever (Deluxe)
"Astral Plans"	2023	—	—	—	—	Infinite Joy
"Lovefool"	2024	—	—	—	—	Non-album single
"Communicating"	2025	—	26	21	—	Accelerator
"Slow Karma"	2025	—	—	—	—	Accelerator
"Mystery Girl"	2025	—	—	—	—	Accelerator
"—" denotes a recording that did not chart or was not released in that territory.

== Band members ==
- Christo Bowman – lead vocals, guitar
- Gavin Bennett – bass, keyboard piano
- Miles Morris – drums

Touring

- Sam Plecker – guitar (2022)
- Jersey Ryan - bass (2026)

Former

- Skyler Leon – guitar (2010–2012)
- Ray Libby – guitar (2012–2022)
