= Language & Perspective =

Studio album by Bad Suns
- Released: June 24, 2014
- Recorded: 2013
- Genre: Alternative rock; indie rock
- Length: 37:32
- Label: Vagrant
- Producer: Eric Palmquist

Bad Suns chronology
| Transpose EP (2014) | Language & Perspective (2014) | Disappear Here (2016) |

Singles from Language & Perspective
- 1. "Cardiac Arrest" Released: November 11, 2013; 2. "Salt" Released: December 12, 2013; 3. "Transpose" Released: January 21, 2014 (EP); 4. "We Move Like the Ocean" Released: June 3, 2014

Language & Perspective is the debut studio album by the American alternative rock band Bad Suns. The album was recorded with Eric Palmquist in Los Angeles, California, in 2013 and was released on June 24, 2014 by Vagrant Records. The album title comes from a lyric in the track "Matthew James."

== Critical reception ==
Professional ratings
Review scores
| Source | Rating |
|---|---|
| AllMusic | 3/5 stars |
| Earmilk | 9/10 stars |

Jessica Goodman and Ryan Kistobak of The Huffington Post included Language & Perspective on their list of 2014's best releases, calling it "a rare indie release with little excess amongst its singles".

== Track listing ==
All tracks are written by Christo Bowman and Bad Suns.

| No. | Title | Length |
|---|---|---|
| 1. | "Matthew James" | 3:24 |
| 2. | "We Move Like the Ocean" | 3:09 |
| 3. | "Cardiac Arrest" | 3:03 |
| 4. | "Pretend" | 3:34 |
| 5. | "Take My Love and Run" | 3:09 |
| 6. | "Dancing on Quicksand" | 3:46 |
| 7. | "Salt" | 3:47 |
| 8. | "Transpose" | 3:53 |
| 9. | "Learn to Trust" | 3:34 |
| 10. | "Sleep Paralysis" | 3:07 |
| 11. | "Rearview" | 3:06 |
| Total length: | | 37:32 |

== Charts ==
| Chart (2014) | Peak position |
|---|---|
| US Billboard 200 | 24 |

== Personnel ==
Bad Suns

- Gavin Bennett – bass
- Christo Bowman – composer, guitar, vocals
- Ray Libby – guitar
- Miles Morris – drums

Additional Personnel

- Eric Palmquist - keys, programming, production, recording & mixing
- John Greenham - mastering
- Michael Garza - assistant engineering
- C.M. Rodriguez - assistant engineering
- Ozzy Carmona - assistant engineering
- Neil Wogensen - assistant engineering
