= Twisted Wheel (band) =

Indie rock group

- Twisted Wheel supporting Oasis at Heaton Park in Manchester June 2009

Background information
- Origin: Oldham, Greater Manchester, England
- Genres: Indie rock, punk rock, post-punk revival
- Years active: 2007–present
- Labels: Columbia Records, Ignition Records
- Members: Jonny Brown; Harry Lavin; Ben Robinson; Benjamin Warwick
- Past members: Rick Lees; Eoghan Clifford; Max Lees
- Website: thetwistedwheel.co.uk

Twisted Wheel are an indie rock band from Saddleworth, Greater Manchester, England.

== Career ==
=== Formation and debut album ===
Twisted Wheel formed in February 2007 in Saddleworth, Greater Manchester by guitarist and singer Jonny Brown and bassist Rick Lees, later joined by drummer Adam Clarke. Frontman Jonny Brown heard the name in a Paul Weller track "Into Tomorrow", where the lyrics say "Round and round like a twisted wheel, Spinning in attempt to find the feel". Twisted Wheel were booked as one of the support acts for Oasis's 2009 Heaton Park concerts.

The band signed to Columbia Records in January 2008. Their first single, "She's a Weapon", was released in April 2008 to acclaim from Radio 1's Zane Lowe, NME and Q. Their follow-up record, a four-track EP entitled You Stole the Sun, was released in July 2008. The band's debut album Twisted Wheel was recorded in June 2008 at Hillside studios in Los Angeles and produced by Dave Sardy.

The album was released on 13 April 2009. The first single from the album, "Lucy the Castle", was released in November 2008, with the follow-up, "We Are Us", released in March 2009.

=== Do It Again (2012) ===
The band drifted from the mainstream attention after 2009 as their style of music declined in popularity. Twisted Wheel released their second album, Do It Again, in September 2012.

=== Break-up and reformation ===
The band broke up on 13 July 2014, which was announced to fans via the band's Twitter account, with the tweet simply stating "R.I.P. Twisted Wheel". They have since reformed.

In 2018 the band announced a 30 date comeback UK tour, with original drummer Adam Clarke rejoining the fold, alongside new members Harry Lavin and Richard Allsopp. During this tour the band were personally invited by Liam Gallagher to join the bill at two huge outdoor shows at Old Trafford Cricket Ground and Finsbury Park. On the day of The Finbusry Park gig the band reached number one in the UK physical charts with the 'Jonny Guitar' EP. In September of that year Clarke and Allsopp both left the band, with new members Ben Robinson and Ben Warwick joining in their place.

In March 2020 the band released their 3rd studio album 'Satisfying The Ritual' to critical acclaim, subsequently entering number 27 in the UK Official sales chart. Just prior to the release of this record, the band once again linked up with Liam Gallagher on a full European tour, before being stopped in their tracks by the covid crisis on the eve of a Uk headline tour.

== Band members ==
=== Current members ===
- Jonny Brown – vocals, guitar
- Harry Lavin – bass
- Ben Warwick – lead guitar
- Ben Robinson – drums

=== Former members ===
- Adam Clarke – drums (2007–2010)
- Rick Lees – bass (2007–2010)
- Eoghan Clifford – drums (2010–2013)
- Stephen Evans – bass (2010–2013)
- Max Lees – bass (2013–2014)
- Blair Murray – drums (2013–2014)
- Adam Birchall – guitar (2013–2014)

== Discography ==
=== Studio albums ===
Year	Title	Chart positions
Year	Title	UK
2009	Twisted Wheel	45
2012	Do It Again	—
2020	Satisfying the Ritual	—

=== Extended plays ===
Year	Title
2008	You Stole the Sun

=== Singles ===
Year	Title
2008	"She's a Weapon"
2008	"Lucy the Castle"
2009	"We Are Us"
2019	"Nomad Hat"
2019	"DNA"

=== Music videos ===
Year	Title	Director(s)
2008	"She's a Weapon"	Iain West
2008	"You Stole the Sun"	Indica
2008	"Lucy the Castle"	Blair Young
2008	"Bouncing Bomb"	?
2009	"We Are Us"	Tim Mattia
