= Ideas Above Our Station =

Studio album by Hundred Reasons
- Released: 20 May 2002
- Recorded: Magic Shop, New York City: Mission Sound, New York City
- Genre: Alternative rock
- Length: 38:41
- Label: Columbia
- Producer: Dave Sardy

Hundred Reasons chronology
Ideas Above Our Station (2002)	Shatterproof Is Not a Challenge (2004)

Professional ratings
Review scores
Source	Rating
AllMusic	2/5 stars
Drowned in Sound	7/10 stars
entertainment.ie	4/5 stars
NME	4/5 stars
The Guardian	4/5 stars

Ideas Above Our Station is the first studio album by the English alternative rock band, Hundred Reasons, released on 20 May 2002 on Columbia Records. The album reached number 6 in the UK Albums Chart and is the band's most commercially successful album to date.

In 2012, the band got together after a three-year break to celebrate the album's ten-year anniversary.

== Artwork ==
The album cover art is a stylised photograph of the Lloyd's Building in London.

== Track listing ==
1. "I'll Find You"
2. "Answers"
3. "Dissolve"
4. "What Thought Did"
5. "If I Could"
6. "Falter"
7. "Shine"
8. "Drowning"
9. "Oratorio"
10. "Silver"
11. "Gone Too Far"
12. "Avalanche"
13. "Remmus" (Bonus Track)
14. "No.5" (Bonus Track)

== Personnel ==
- Andy Bews - drums
- Colin Doran - lead vocals, keyboard
- Andy Gilmour - bass guitar
- Larry Hibbitt - guitar, vocals, lead vocals (chorus of "Shine")
- Paul Townsend - guitar, vocals, lead vocals (verses of "Silver")
- Dave Sardy - producer
- Greg Fidelman - engineering
- Greg Gordon - editing, additional engineering
- Juan Garcia - second engineer
- Peter - second engineer
- Jennifer Paola - production coordinator
- Stephen Marcussen - mastering
- Stewart Whitmore - digital editing
- Steve Gullick - photography
- Dave Goodchild - photography
- Mark Unwin / Precession Industries - design, illustration

== Charts ==
Chart (2002)	Peak position
UK Albums (OCC)	6

=== Singles ===
Year	Single	Chart	Position
2001	"I'll Find You"	UK Singles Chart	37
2002	"If I Could"	UK Singles Chart	19
2002	"Silver"	UK Singles Chart	15
2002	"Falter"	UK Singles Chart	38

== Certifications ==
Region	Certification	Certified units/sales
United Kingdom (BPI)	Gold	100,000^{*}
^{*} Sales figures based on certification alone.
