= Funeral Party =

American alternative rock band

- Origin: Whittier, California, U.S.
- Genres: Alternative rock, dance-punk, indie rock
- Years active: 2005–2016; 2019
- Labels: Jive, RCA, Fearless
- Past members: Chad Elliott; James Lawrence Torres; Kimo Kauhola; Timothy Madrid; Daniel Santillan; George Falcon Verdugo; Neil Gonzales; Robert Shaffer; Alfredo Ortiz; Dylan Miller

Funeral Party was an American alternative rock band, formed in 2005. The band's line-up consisted of vocalist Chad Elliott, guitarist James Lawrence Torres, bassist Kimo Kauhola, and multi instrumentalist Timothy Madrid

== History ==
The original members formed the band one night in a park in their hometown of Whittier, California, a suburb just outside Los Angeles, California, choosing to name themselves after The Cure song of the same name. The band became their ticket out of Whittier: "We all came from the same shitty town, and you have two choices: grow up and get a job or get out. That's what we tried to do with the band..."

Funeral Party tirelessly performed every weekend at backyard parties and warehouses in the Los Angeles area. One show they played in a gang-affiliated location involved somebody in the crowd being stabbed while they performed "New York City Moves to the Sound of L.A.". Initially they didn't own any musical equipment of their own and had to borrow it from the bands they performed with. After seeing a performance, Lars Stalfors, an engineer and producer with The Mars Volta at the time, invited the band to record. The recording sessions took place during The Mars Volta's off hours, and yielded the song "Chalice".

Funeral Party garnered music industry attention in late 2007 with the release of an article, falsely attributed to the Los Angeles Times, which touted the band as, "Princes of the Eastside". The article accurately noted that Funeral Party shared a core audience with such bands as Moving Units, The Rapture, and LCD Sound System, and illuminated the burgeoning East Los Angeles scene as a hotbed of young talent. The article was rampantly distributed online among those familiar with the group, and caused an uproar among bands and musicians who displayed a territorial sense of ownership over the East Los Angeles music scene, which mobilized local polemics regarding Funeral Party, and often rendered their singer a target for violence. During 2007 and early 2008, Funeral Party shows were usually shut down by law enforcement before the band performed, which only added to the group's notoriety.

The band first signed to Fearless Records; however, Fearless decided not to release Funeral Party's full-length due to a marketing dispute. Fearless opted instead to release the band's demos on the 2008 Bootleg EP. To promote the EP, Funeral Party embarked on a two-week tour of the US, supporting the French artist, Yelle. Funeral Party embarked on a subsequent US tour, during which they were dropped. The tour concluded in Austin at the South by Southwest music festival and conference, where the band procured a new record deal.

After moving on from Fearless, the band signed to Sony Music for their debut release The Golden Age of Knowhere which was released on January 24, 2011 in the UK, and on January 21, 2011 digitally/January 28, 2011 physically in Australia. The US release date was March 29, 2011.

NME placed them at number 47 on their '50 Best New Bands of 2010' end-of-year list.

They supported this first release with appearances on the Late Show with David Letterman, Jimmy Kimmel Live! and Conan.

Their song "Finale" was featured in a Taco Bell commercial for the "Doritos Locos Taco" in which a group of friends travel a very long distance to get tacos. The song is currently the introductory background music for "The Really Big Show with Tony Rizzo" on the Cleveland, OH radiostation ESPN850 WKNR.

In October 2013, the guitarist James Torres stated on his Twitter account that a second album is being written, to be launched in 2014, showing off a new song called Circles, but that album never came to fruition.

They separated on March 15, 2016, but are back together and playing their first show in three years at the inaugural Just Like Heaven festival in Long Beach on May 4, 2019.

== Members ==
- Chad Elliott – vocals
- James Lawrence Torres – guitar
- Kimo Kauhola – bass
- Timothy Madrid– keyboard

=== Former touring drummers ===
- George Falcon Verdugo
- Neil Gonzales
- Robert Shaffer
- Alfredo Ortiz (also as a studio musician)
- Dylan Miller

== Discography ==
=== Studio albums ===
Year	Album details	Peak chart positions
Year	Album details	UK
2011	The Golden Age of Knowhere: Released: 24 January 2011; Label: RCA Records; Formats: CD, digital download, Vinyl	37

=== Extended plays ===
Year	Album details
2008	Bootleg: Released: 2 December 2008; Label: Fearless Records; Formats: Digital download
2011	Live at the BBC: Released: 25 January 2011; Label: RCA Records; Formats: Digital download

=== Singles ===
Year	Single	Album
2010	"New York City Moves to the Sound of L.A."	The Golden Age of Knowhere
2010	"Just Because"	The Golden Age of Knowhere
2010	"Finale"	The Golden Age of Knowhere
