= The Magic Gang =

British indie band

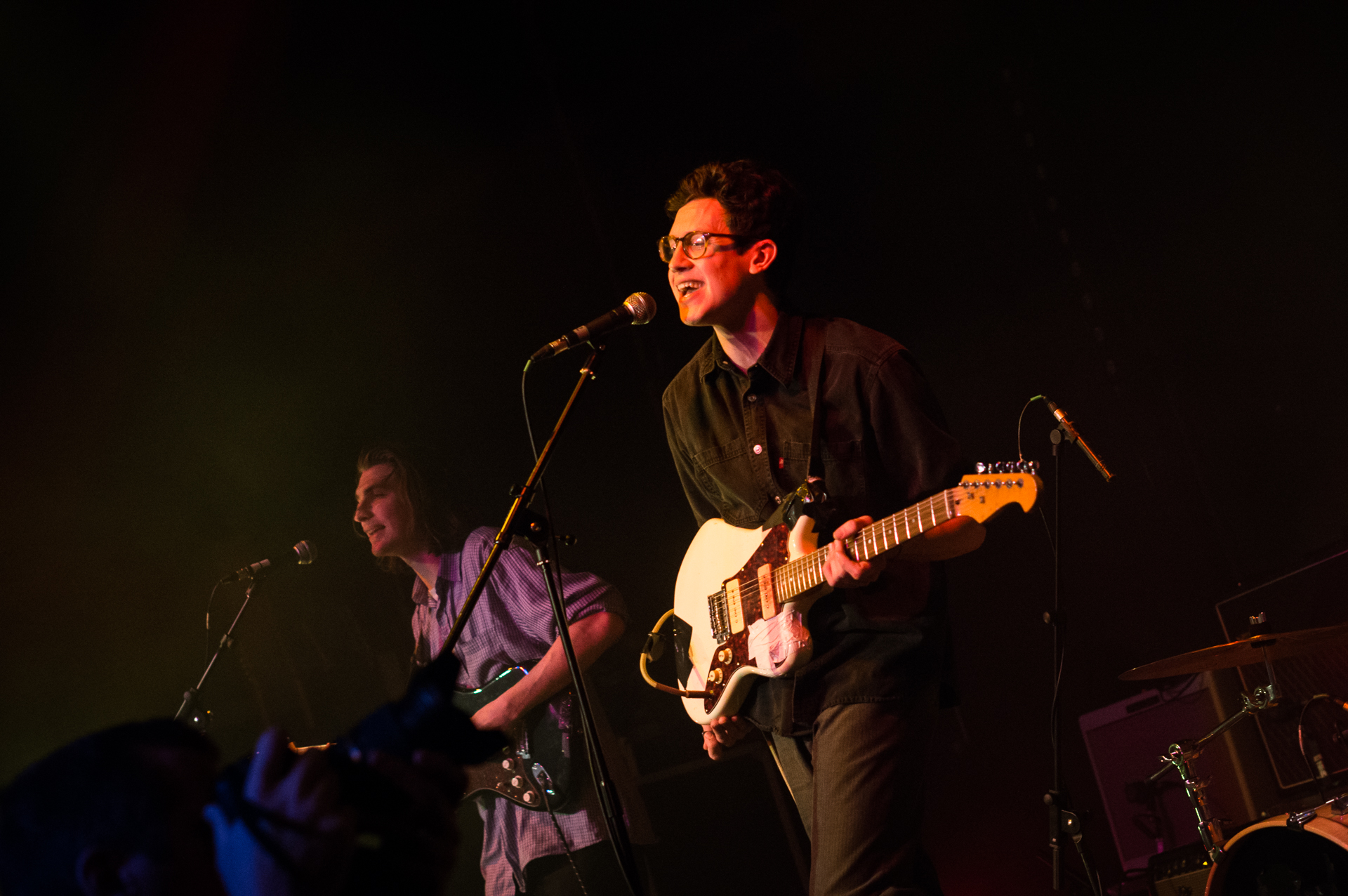
- The Magic Gang performing in 2015

Background information
- Origin: Brighton, England
- Genres: Indie rock, indie pop
- Years active: 2013–2024
- Labels: Warner, YALA! Records, Telharmonium
- Past members: Jack Kaye; Angus Taylor; Kristian Smith; Paeris Giles

The Magic Gang were an English indie rock band formed in Brighton in 2013. The band consists of Jack Kaye and Kristian Smith who are vocalists and guitarists, bassist Angus Taylor, and drummer Paeris Giles. Songs from the band have been described as having elements of power pop and indie pop, and the group's vocal harmonies have been compared to those of the Beach Boys.

== History ==
The band members are originally from Bournemouth. Kaye and Smith met each other at Brockenhurst College. They moved in together with Taylor and Giles in Brighton after meeting them while studying at BIMM University.

The band released their first EP, The Magic Gang, on 8 January 2016 on the record label Teleharmonium Records. They released their second EP, The Second EP From, on 23 September 2016 and their third, EP Three on 24 March 2017. EP Three was the first ever release on YALA! Records, a record label that had recently been founded by Felix White, guitarist from The Maccabees.

In 2018, the band released their debut album The Magic Gang. The album reached number 12 on the UK Albums Chart and received a score of 71 on Metacritic which indicates "generally favorable reviews". Outlets who gave positive reviews of the album include NME, The Line of Best Fit, DIY Magazine, and The Guardian. The band was also nominated for the "Best New Artist" award at the 2018 NME Awards.

In March 2020, the band were meant to embark on a UK tour with Blossoms but the tour only commenced in August 2021 after it was postponed as a consequence of the COVID-19 pandemic.

The band released their second album, Death of the Party, in August 2020.

In January 2024, the Magic Gang announced that they are breaking up, allowing them to spend some time exploring their own creative pursuits.

== Band members ==
- Jack Kaye — vocals, guitar
- Kristian Smith — vocals, guitar
- Angus Taylor — vocals, bass
- Paeris Giles — drums
- Connor Clark - bass (2016)

== Discography ==
=== Studio albums ===
- The Magic Gang (2018)
- Death of the Party (2020)

=== Extended plays ===
- The Magic Gang (2016)
- The Second EP From (2016)
- EP Three (2017)
