= Hundred Reasons =

English alternative rock band

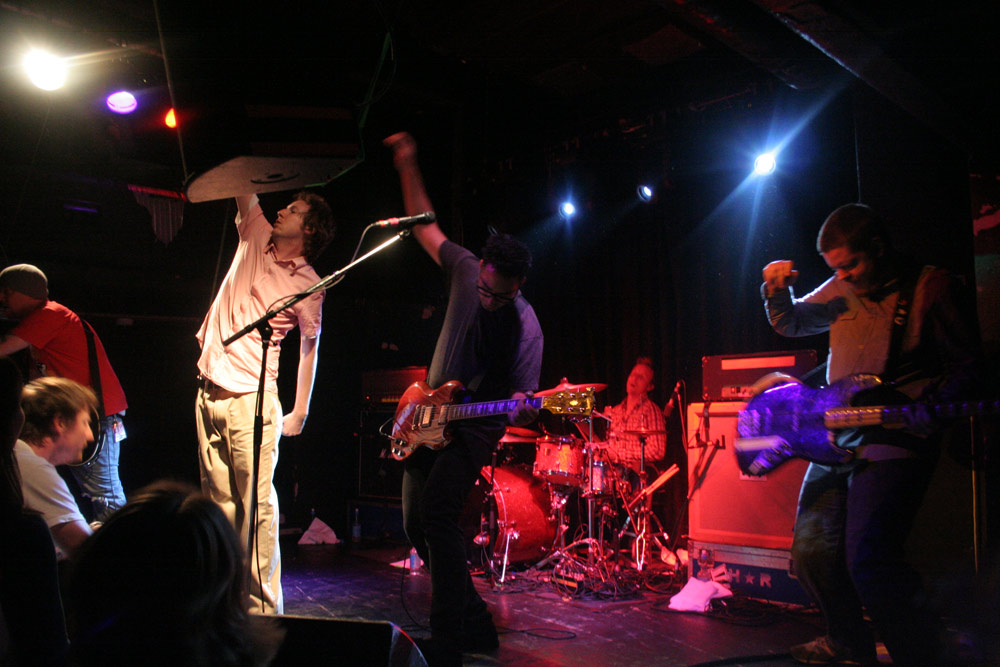
- Hundred Reasons performing in 2007

Background information
- Origin: London, England
- Genres: Emo; post-hardcore; alternative rock
- Years active: 1999–2009; 2012; 2014; 2021–present
- Labels: Sony BMG; Columbia; V2
- Members: Andy Bews; Colin Doran; Andy Gilmour; Larry Hibbitt
- Past members: Paul Townsend; Ben Doyle
- Website: hundredreasons.com

Hundred Reasons are an English alternative rock band formed in London, England, in 1999. It consists of Colin Doran (vocals), Larry Hibbitt (guitar, vocals), Andy Gilmour (bass), and Andy Bews (drums).

After releasing EpOne, EpTwo, and EpThree between 2000 and 2001, Hundred Reasons issued their debut full-length album, Ideas Above Our Station, in 2002, to critical acclaim and commercial success. The album yielded the singles "I'll Find You", "If I Could", "Silver", and "Falter", and was followed by Shatterproof Is Not a Challenge in 2004. After being dropped by Columbia Records, the band signed with V2 Records and released their third studio album, Kill Your Own, in 2006. Guitarist and vocalist Paul Townsend departed following the release and was replaced by Ben Doyle for the band's fourth album, Quick the Word, Sharp the Action (2007).

Following years of inactivity, Hundred Reasons played tenth-anniversary shows in 2012 and briefly reunited again for two shows in 2014. After regrouping in 2021, they issued their fifth album, Glorious Sunset, in 2023.

Hundred Reasons have had six top-40 hit singles and two top-20 hit albums.

== Career ==
=== Formation and first releases: 1999–2004 ===
Hundred Reasons was formed in London, England, in 1999. They have cited influences including Hum, Cave In, Stapleton, Guns N' Roses, Faith No More, Orange 9mm, Far, Soulwax, Helmet, Minor Threat, Youth of Today, Fugazi, and Quicksand. By 2001, they had released three EPs: EpOne, EpTwo, and EpThree, as well as a split EP with the American punk rock band Garrison.

The band's debut, full-length album, Ideas Above Our Station, was released in 2002. It peaked at No. 6 on the UK Albums Chart, achieved Gold status, with sales of over 118,000 copies, and spawned several Top 40 hits on the UK Singles Chart.

Their second album, Shatterproof Is Not a Challenge, was released in 2004. Despite successful tours and achieving Silver status with sales of more than 65,000 copies within four months, Hundred Reasons were dropped by Sony BMG in June 2004.

=== Subsequent releases and lineup change (2005–2009) ===
Hundred Reasons signed to V2 Records in September 2005 and issued their third studio album, Kill Your Own, in 2006. In August of that year, it was announced on the band's official website that guitarist and vocalist Paul Townsend would be leaving the band. He was replaced by Ben Doyle of the Lucky Nine.

In October 2007, the band published their fourth album, Quick the Word, Sharp the Action. Less than a month later, V2 Records was purchased by Universal Records and left the band without a label once more. They re-released a remastered version of Quick the Word, Sharp the Action in 2009.

=== Hiatus and reunion shows (2009–2014) ===
After the re-release of Quick the Word, Sharp the Action, Hundred Reasons went on an extended hiatus. Reflecting on this period in an interview with NME in 2022, Doran stated: "After Quick the Word, personally for me that felt like it was going to be it. I'm quite pragmatic and I think it had some good songs on it, but it wasn't what I would call our best record. Things were on a bit of a downward turn, to be open and frank about it. We just ended up, not necessarily dissolving the band but everybody had to go and find other things to do. Those things took over, then weeks turned into months, which turned into years. Larry was building his career as a producer, I was in education and doing stuff like that, Bews was living in America which made rehearsal quite different, and Andy was in another band at the time called Freeze Atlantic."

In April 2012, the band announced that they would be performing songs from their first album, Ideas Above Our Station, at both Banquet Records' Big Day Out and 2000Trees, and that they had been rejoined by Paul Townsend. Hell Is for Heroes drummer Joe Birch performed with them that summer."

On 8 May, it was revealed that Townsend would not be performing with the band after all.

In 2014, Hundred Reasons reunited once more to play the Sonisphere Festival.

=== Glorious Sunset (2022–present) ===
On 25 October 2022, the band announced that they would be releasing their first new music in fifteen years, with a single called "Glorious Sunset". A full-length album, also titled Glorious Sunset, came out on 24 February 2023.

On 4 March 2025, the band announced that their final headline concert would be on 7 May 2025 at the Royal Albert Hall.

== Band members ==
Current

- Colin Doran – lead vocals, keyboards (1999–2012; 2014; 2021–present)
- Larry Hibbitt – guitar, occasional lead vocals (1999–2012; 2014; 2021–present)
- Andy Gilmour – bass, backing vocals (1999–2012; 2014; 2021–present)
- Andy Bews – drums (1999–2009; 2012; 2021–present)

Past

- Paul Townsend – guitar, occasional lead vocals (1999–2006, 2012)
- Ben Doyle – guitar (2006–2009)

Timeline

== Discography ==
=== Studio albums ===
Year	Album details	Peak chart positions				Certification
Year	Album details	UK	UK Rock	UK Indie	SCO	Certification
2002	Ideas Above Our Station: Released: 20 May 2002; Label: Columbia; Formats: CD, digital download	6	1	-	7	UK: Gold
2004	Shatterproof Is Not a Challenge: Released: 1 March 2004; Label: Columbia; Formats: CD, digital download	20	1	-	22	
2006	Kill Your Own: Released: 20 March 2006; Label: V2; Formats: CD, digital download	79	3	4	94	
2007	Quick the Word, Sharp the Action: Released: 15 October 2007/20 April 2009 (re-release); Label: V2; Formats: CD, digital download	100	4	-	-	
2023	Glorious Sunset: Released: 24 February 2023; Label: SO Recordings; Formats: Vinyl, CD, digital download	-	5	10	-	

=== Live albums ===
Year	Album details
2004	Live Bootleg: Released: November 2004; Label: Gravity DIP; Formats: CD, digital download
2005	Live at Freakscene: Released: 26 September 2005; Label: Secret Records; Formats: CD, digital download
2012	Year Ten: Live at the Forum: Released: 24 November 2012; Label: Abbey Road Live; Formats: CD, digital download
2023	Live at Hammersmith: Released: Sept 2023; Label: So Recordings; Formats:digital download

=== EPs ===
Year	EP details	Peak chart positions	
Year	EP details	UK	SCO
2000	EpOne: Released: 31 July 2000; Label: Fierce Panda; Formats: CD,	90	—
2001	EpTwo: Released: 6 August 2001; Label: Columbia; Formats: CD,	47	42
2001	Garrison / Hundred Reasons: Released: 27 August 2001; Label: Simba Recordings; Formats: CD,	—	—
2001	EpThree: Released: 15 December 2001; Label: Columbia; Formats: CD,	37	38

=== Singles ===
Year	Title	Peak chart positions				Album
Year	Title	UK	UK Rock	UK Indie	SCO	Album
2002	"If I Could"	19	3	—	19	Ideas Above Our Station
2002	"Silver"	15	2	—	18	Ideas Above Our Station
2002	"Falter"	38	5	—	44	Ideas Above Our Station
2003	"The Great Test"	29	4	—	29	Shatterproof Is Not a Challenge
2004	"What You Get"	30	1	—	32	Shatterproof Is Not a Challenge
2004	"How Soon Is Now?"	47	6	—	46	Non-album single
2006	"Kill Your Own"	45	2	2	23	Kill Your Own
2006	"The Perfect Gift"	111	3	11	46	Kill Your Own
2006	"The Chance/Live Fast, Die Ugly"	—	—	—	—	Kill Your Own
2007	"No Way Back"	—	—	—	—	Quick the Word, Sharp the Action
2009	"I'll Never Know"	—	—	—	—	Quick the Word, Sharp the Action
2009	"Break the Glass"	—	—	—	—	Quick the Word, Sharp the Action
2022	"Glorious Sunset"	—	—	—	—	Glorious Sunset
2022	"New Glasses"	—	—	—	—	Glorious Sunset
2022	"The Old School Way"	—	—	—	—	Glorious Sunset
2023	"Replicate"	—	—	—	—	Glorious Sunset
