= Disappear Here (Bad Suns album) =

Studio album by Bad Suns
- Released: September 16, 2016
- Recorded: 2015
- Genre: Alternative rock; indie rock
- Length: 45:42
- Label: Vagrant
- Producer: Eric Palmquist

Bad Suns chronology
Language & Perspective (2014)	Disappear Here (2016)	Mystic Truth (2019)

Singles from Disappear Here
- 1. "Disappear Here" Released: July 26, 2016; 2. "Heartbreaker" Released: 2016; 3. "Daft Pretty Boys" Released: 2016

Professional ratings
Review scores
Source	Rating
AllMusic	3/5 stars
Sputnik Music	4/5
New Noise Magazine	3.5/5
Alternative Press	Positive

Disappear Here is the second studio album by the American alternative rock band Bad Suns. The album was recorded with Eric Palmquist in Los Angeles, California in 2015 and was released on 16 September 2016 by Vagrant Records.

== Track listing ==
All tracks are written by Christo Bowman, all songs produced by Eric Palmquist

No.	Title	Length
1.	"Disappear Here"	3:45
2.	"Heartbreaker"	3:26
3.	"Off She Goes"	3:56
4.	"Love Like Revenge"	3:44
5.	"Even in My Dreams, I Can't Win"	3:58
6.	"Patience"	3:32
7.	"Swimming in the Moonlight"	3:41
8.	"Defeated"	3:37
9.	"Daft Pretty Boys"	3:07
10.	"Violet"	3:18
11.	"Maybe We're Meant to Be Alone"	3:25
12.	"How Am I Not Myself"	2:33
13.	"Outskirts of Paradise"	3:20
Total length:		45:42

== Personnel ==
Bad Suns

- Gavin Bennett – bass
- Christo Bowman – composer, guitar, vocals
- Ray Libby – guitar
- Miles Morris – drums

Production

- Eric Palmquist – engineer, mixing, production
- Steven Aguilar – engineer, mixing assistant
- Jake Munk – mixing assistant
- Joe LaPorta – mastering

Additional personnel

- Jeremy Berman – drum technician
- Dan Moore – drum technician
- Bruce Nelson – guitar technician

Artwork

- Kevin Circosta – art direction, design, photography
- Adam Alessi – band photo
- Randall Leddy – layout

== Charts ==
Chart (2014)	Peak position
US Billboard 200	109
