= Twisted Wheel (album) =

Studio album by Twisted Wheel
- Released: 6 May 2009
- Length: 35:31
- Label: Columbia

Twisted Wheel chronology
Twisted Wheel (2009)	Do It Again (2012)

Singles from Twisted Wheel
- 1. "She's a Weapon" Released: April 2008; 2. "You Stole the Sun" Released: July 2008; 3. "Lucy the Castle" Released: November 2008; 4. "We Are Us" Released: March 2009

Twisted Wheel is the debut studio album by English indie rock band Twisted Wheel. It was released on 6 May 2009. The singles released were "Lucy the Castle", "She's a Weapon", "We Are Us" and "You Stole the Sun".

== Track listing ==
1. "Lucy the Castle" – 2:46
2. "She's a Weapon" – 1:52
3. "We Are Us" – 3:29
4. "Oh What Have You Done" – 2:59
5. "Strife" – 4:20
6. "One Night on the Streets" – 2:33
7. "Let Them Have It All" – 3:12
8. "Bad Candy" – 2:58
9. "You Stole the Sun" – 3:51
10. "Bouncing Bomb" – 3:34
11. "What's Your Name" – 3:57

== Charts ==
Chart performance for Twisted Wheel
Chart (2009)	Peak position
Scottish Albums (OCC)	74
UK Albums (OCC)	45
