= Barkmarket =

American rock band

- Origin: New York City, U.S.
- Genre: Noise rock
- Years active: 1987–1997
- Labels: Triple X Records, Def American, American Recordings, Warner Bros. Records
- Past members: John Nowlin; Dave Sardy; Rock Savage

Barkmarket was an American rock music group formed in New York City in 1987. Personnel were singer/guitarist and main songwriter Dave Sardy, bass guitarist John Nowlin and drummer Rock Savage.

Barkmarket's music was usually loud and aggressive, touching on many styles (most prominently including heavy metal, hardcore punk and noise rock), but not resting definitively in any one genre.

== History ==
In 1986, they released an independently recorded demo tape called BARKMARKET, then in 1987 recorded 1-800-GODHOUSE on cassette 4tk. They were signed to Purge/Soundleague in NYC. After recording the second album Easy Listening the band moved to Triple X Records, who released the group's third album, Vegas Throat; the latter featured guest work from avant-jazz guitarist Marc Ribot.

Vegas Throat attracted the interest of Rick Rubin, and Barkmarket was one of the first groups signed to Rubin's American Recordings. Vegas Throat was reissued by American, which then issued Gimmick and the Lardroom EP. During this time, they released the Peacekeeper EP on the Man's Ruin record label.

L. Ron (1996) was Barkmarket's final album. Sardy's engineering/production work was taking precedence over his own band, and the group quietly broke up in 1997. Sardy has since become an in-demand producer and mixer for many heavy rock groups (e.g., System of a Down, Marilyn Manson, Wolfmother, Helmet, Quicksand) or even pop heavyweights like Oasis or The Thrills.

Sardy has been quoted as saying he made a promise to himself that each of their albums would be a progression in the muli-track recording technology used, from four track on 1-800-GOD-HOUSE, to eight track (Easy Listening), to 16 track (Vegas Throat), and then 24 track (Gimmick) with a promise to go back to four track for the final album. The beginning of "Visible Cow" on the album L Ron was an attempt to keep that promise.

Sardy was picked as one of the top ten up and coming film composers of 2010 for his work scoring the movies 21, and Zombieland by Composers Monthly.

== Musical style ==
Critic Stewart Mason wrote that the band "can at times be frustratingly difficult to pin down, but their best work has a noisy, rattling power." There were also odd touches that demonstrated an experimental edge: the eerie banjo and tape loops on "(Radio Static)" (from Gimmick), and the nearly delta blues acoustic slide guitar on "Visible Cow" (from L. Ron).

Sardy's ragged, proto-screamo vocals usually offered bizarre lyrics that were at once evocative and absurd, and rarely without a menacing undercurrent: "I bought a handgun made out of glass/I cut a hole in the side of a wild ass" ("Visible Cow"); critic Ted Alvarez wrote, "Sardy's distended poetry often has a dark humor about it; lines like "I opened all your mail" ("Feed Me") and "I got a game/it won't take long/we'll list all our beatings in a cursory rhyme" ("How are You") add a dash of laughter to the often humorless scowl across the face of hardcore music."

== Discography ==
=== Studio albums ===
- 1-800-GODHOUSE (1988)
- Easy Listening (1989) US CMJ College Chart No. 97
- Vegas Throat (1992)
- Gimmick (1993)
- L Ron (1996)

=== EPs ===
- Lardroom (1994)
- Peacekeeper (1995)
