= International Magic Live at the O2 =

International Magic Live at The O2

Video by Noel Gallagher's High Flying Birds
- Released: 15 October 2012
- Recorded: 26 February 2012 at The O2 Arena, London
- Genre: Alternative rock
- Length: 98:00
- Label: Sour Mash
- Director: Dick Carruthers
- Producers: Dick Carruthers, Jeremy Azis

International Magic Live at The O2 is the debut video album by English rock band Noel Gallagher's High Flying Birds. Released on 15 October 2012, the album documents the band's performance at The O2 Arena in London on 26 February 2012, as part of their High Flying Birds Tour. The footage was directed by Dick Carruthers, produced by Carruthers and Jeremy Azis, and features the full performance from the show as well as additional footage from the tour.

== Track listing ==
All songs written and composed by Noel Gallagher. Tracks 2, 3, 12, 16, 20, and 23–26 originally performed by Oasis.

1. Intro – 1:19
2. "(It's Good) To Be Free" – 3:35
3. "Mucky Fingers" – 3:26
4. "Everybody's on the Run" – 5:11
5. "Dream On" – 4:10
6. Interlude 1 – 0:43
7. "If I Had a Gun..." – 4:02
8. "The Good Rebel" – 4:10
9. "The Death of You and Me" – 3:13
10. Interlude 2 – 0:33
11. "Freaky Teeth" – 4:33
12. "Supersonic" – 4:13
13. "(I Wanna Live in a Dream in My) Record Machine" – 4:44
14. Interlude 3 – 2:22
15. "AKA... What a Life!" – 5:59
16. "Talk Tonight" – 5:50
17. "Soldier Boys and Jesus Freaks" – 3:13
18. Interlude 4 – 1:22
19. "AKA... Broken Arrow" – 3:39
20. "Half the World Away" – 3:47
21. "(Stranded On) The Wrong Beach" – 4:16
22. Interlude 5 – 1:13
23. "Whatever" – 4:54
24. "Little by Little" – 5:36
25. "The Importance of Being Idle" – 4:20
26. "Don't Look Back in Anger" – 5:08
27. Outro – 2:28

== Additional content ==
In addition to the footage from the O2 Arena show, there is a second DVD which documents the band's show at the Virgin Mobile Mod Club in Toronto, Canada in November 2011, the Ride the Tiger music video trilogy, and the group's performance at the 2012 NME Awards.

=== Bonus DVD ===
All tracks are written by Noel Gallagher.

Live at the Virgin Mobile Mod Club, Toronto, Canada, 5 November 2011
No.	Title	Length
1.	"Intro"	0:11
2.	"(It's Good) To Be Free" (originally performed by Oasis)	3:53
3.	"Talk Tonight" (originally performed by Oasis)	5:14
4.	"If I Had a Gun..."	3:55
5.	"Supersonic" (originally performed by Oasis)	3:54
6.	"Wonderwall" (originally performed by Oasis)	5:22
7.	"AKA... What a Life!"	4:59
8.	"Half the World Away" (originally performed by Oasis)	4:43
9.	"Don't Look Back in Anger" (originally performed by Oasis)	5:03
Total length:		37:30

Ride the Tiger
No.	Title	Length
1.	"Ride the Tiger"	19:10
Total length:		19:10

Live at the NME Awards 2012
No.	Title	Length
1.	"Everybody's on the Run"	5:04
2.	"Dream On"	4:01
3.	"If I Had a Gun..."	3:48
4.	"AKA... What a Life!"	4:13
5.	"Half the World Away" (originally performed by Oasis)	3:40
6.	"Don't Look Back in Anger" (originally performed by Oasis)	4:52
Total length:		25:43

=== Faster Than the Speed of Magic ===
Faster Than the Speed of Magic

Compilation album by Noel Gallagher's High Flying Birds
- Genre: Alternative rock
- Length: 51:46
- Producer: Noel Gallagher

Faster Than the Speed of Magic is bonus compilation album by Noel Gallagher's High Flying Birds included in the special editions of the International Magic Live at The O2 video album. It consists of thirteen demo recordings, including demos for ten tracks from the band's self-titled debut album, two B-sides and previously unreleased song "Freaky Teeth".

=== Track listing ===
All songs written and composed by Noel Gallagher.

1. "Everybody's on the Run" – 5:50
2. "Dream On" – 4:02
3. "If I Had a Gun..." – 4:10
4. "The Death of You and Me" – 3:28
5. "(I Wanna Live in a Dream in My) Record Machine" – 4:27
6. "Ride the Tiger a.k.a. What a Life!" – 4:13
7. "Soldier Boys and Jesus Freaks" – 3:21
8. "Fallen Angel a.k.a. Broken Arrow" – 3:29
9. "(Stranded On) The Wrong Beach" – 3:33
10. "Stop the Clocks" – 4:58
11. "The Good Rebel" – 4:24
12. "I'd Pick You Every Time" – 1:50
13. "Freaky Teeth" – 4:01

== Personnel ==
Noel Gallagher's High Flying Birds

- Noel Gallagher – lead vocals, guitars, production (Faster Than the Speed of Magic)
- Tim Smith – guitar, backing vocals
- Russell Pritchard – bass, backing vocals
- Mikey Rowe – keyboards
- Jeremy Stacey – drums
- Jack Birchwood – trumpet
- Trevor Mires – trombone
- Andy Kinsman – saxophone
- Crouch End Festival Chorus – choir vocals
- David Temple – choir vocal conduction

Additional personnel

- Dick Carruthers – direction, production
- Jeremy Azis – production
- Ed Coleman – editing
- Will Shapland – recording, mixing
- Ian Cooper – mastering
- Mazen Murad – mastering
- Julian House – design
- Lawrence Watson – photography
- Mike Bruce – direction (Ride the Tiger)
- Blake West – production (Ride the Tiger)
