= Dig Out Your Soul Tour =

2008–09 concert tour by Oasis

- Tour by Oasis
- Poster to the concert in Singapore
- Location: Africa; Asia; Europe; North America; South America
- Associated album: Dig Out Your Soul
- Start date: 26 August 2008
- End date: 22 August 2009
- Legs: 7
- No. of shows: 118

Oasis concert chronology
- Don't Believe the Truth Tour (2005–06); Dig Out Your Soul Tour (2008–09); Oasis Live '25 Tour (2025)

The Dig Out Your Soul Tour was a concert tour by English rock band Oasis to support their album Dig Out Your Soul. The tour started in Seattle, Washington, at the WaMu Theater on 26 August 2008 and was planned to continue until 30 August 2009, when they were scheduled to play their final tour show at the I-Day Festival in Milan, Italy.

On 28 August 2009, after a fight backstage between the Gallaghers, their manager announced the cancellation of their concert at the Rock en Seine festival near Paris just minutes before it was set to begin. Noel Gallagher released a statement on the band's website two hours later that signalled the end of both the tour and the band: "It's with some sadness and a great relief to tell you that I quit Oasis tonight. People would write and say what they liked, but I could not continue working with Liam for a day longer. Apologies to everyone who bought tickets for the Paris, Konstanz, and Milan shows."

This tour would be Oasis's last until they announced their reunion tour in August 2024, almost 15 years to the day after the band split up, and remains the band's last in promotion of a studio album after Noel ruled out new music in a 2026 talkSPORT interview.

== Background ==
Before the band embarked on the tour, songwriter/guitarist Noel Gallagher jokingly said he considered outplaying The Rolling Stones' A Bigger Bang Tour, which was the highest-grossing tour of all time, earning $558 million and lasting over two years. He fell back on minimising it to a year and a half, citing exhaustion as a reason.

The band played a special show for fans in their rehearsal studio on 14 August 2008. The setlist included some of their oldest tunes but surprisingly included a track from Be Here Now, "My Big Mouth. Several songs from the band, including "Gas Panic!", "Live Forever" and "The Turning" as well as new songs such as "Everybody's on the Run," "If I Had a Gun...", "Stop the Clocks," and "A Simple Game of Genius," all of which would later be recorded for Noel's solo project, Noel Gallagher's High Flying Birds, were played in soundchecks, but did not make any appearances at the band's actual concerts.

Midway through their "Morning Glory" performance in Toronto, Ontario, Canada, at the annual Virgin Festival in September 2008, a man ran on stage and hit Noel on the back, knocking him to the ground. The band left the stage, but after five minutes, the show continued. It is unknown how the man got past security, although he was seen coming from backstage. A 47-year-old Canadian was charged with assault. The incident sparked many well-known media outlets worldwide, especially North America, to report on the story.

Due to the injuries Noel sustained in the incident at the Virgin Festival, four concerts were postponed, including the 9 September show in London, Ontario, and the first three shows of the European leg. In addition, the 12 September concert in New York City was cancelled.

After the Toronto incident from early September, security for the rest of the 2008 shows cracked down to disposing personal belongings. After the start of the summer tour, it loosened up, noticeably at the Slane Castle shows where many thousands of people had passed security gates without being searched, urging many other people who had not paid to see the band attend as well.

The Wembley Arena, London (16 October) gig was broadcast live in the United Kingdom and Ireland on MTV One, and on 24 October, Oasis broke ticket sales for a single day in the UK, selling over 500,000 tickets in 7 hours.

On 2 February Oasis performed in Milan, Italy in front of a crowd of 12,000 for the first time in more than three years. The Italian leg of the tour also included Rome, Treviso, Bolzano, and Florence.

On 28 February, Oasis was informed by their Chinese promoters that the Chinese authorities that they had their performing licenses revoked and their gigs in Shanghai and Beijing canceled. According to the promoters, the Chinese government had recently discovered that Noel Gallagher had performed at a Free Tibet Benefit Concert in New York in 1997, and on their MySpace page, the band expressed disappointment and bewilderment at the decision.

On 1 April, Oasis performed at Seoul Olympic Stadium, three years after their last gig in Korea in 2006. During the show, Noel commented it was "good to be back...you seem to have grown crazier."

On 30 April, Oasis played their first gig in Lima, Peru selling out Estadio Nacional, playing for more than 48,000 fans. During an interview in Chile before the show in Santiago, Andy Bell, alongside Gem Archer, said that the Lima gig was possibly his favourite gig and the best they have ever done, saying that it was "really incredible".

During interviews in early 2009, Noel stated that this may be the last tour they will ever embark on or at least for several years due to growing older.

On 4 June 2009, Oasis played the first of three concerts at Manchester's Heaton Park and, after having to leave the stage twice due to a generator failure, came on the third time to declare the gig was now a free concert. The band later issued fans with cheques worth £45 each to refund the price of their tickets.

On 9 July 2009 at Wembley Stadium, Noel dedicated "Live Forever" to the lead singer of The Verve, Richard Ashcroft, who was in the crowd watching the show.

On 23 August 2009, the band pulled out of their headlining slot at the V Festival in Chelmsford and were replaced by Snow Patrol. The official reason given was that Liam was suffering from laryngitis, but rumours started speculating that a split was imminent. This marks the V Festival slot at Weston Park, Stafford, on 22 August 2009, as the last Oasis gig for over 15 years. On 28 August 2009, Noel admitted he could no longer work with Liam and that the tour and the band were now finished.

== Support acts ==
- Cachorro Grande
- Caesars
- Cornershop
- Detroit Social Club
- Estelares
- Everlaunch
- Free Peace
- Glasvegas
- Howard Eliott Payne (7–10 November 2008)
- Kasabian
- Los Tipitos
- Matt Costa
- Primavera de Praga
- Reverend and The Makers
- Ryan Adams
- Sergeant
- The Blizzards
- The Cardinals
- The Enemy
- The Floor Is Made of Lava
- The Peth
- The Prodigy
- The Secret Machines
- The Sixteen Tonnes
- The Soundtrack of our Lives
- Tomte
- Travis
- Turbopotamos
- Twisted Wheel

== Set list ==
This set list is representative of the performance on 11 July 2009 in London, England. It does not represent all concerts for the duration of the tour.

"Fuckin' in the Bushes" (tape)

1. "Rock 'n' Roll Star"
2. "Lyla"
3. "The Shock of the Lightning"
4. "Cigarettes & Alcohol"
5. "Roll with It"
6. "To Be Where There's Life"
7. "Waiting for the Rapture"
8. "The Masterplan"
9. "Songbird"
10. "Slide Away"
11. "Morning Glory"
12. "My Big Mouth"
13. "The Importance of Being Idle"
14. "Half the World Away"
15. "I'm Outta Time"
16. "Wonderwall"
17. "Supersonic"
18. "Live Forever"

Encore

19. "Don't Look Back in Anger"
20. "Falling Down"
21. "Champagne Supernova"
22. "I Am the Walrus"

Other songs performed:

1. "The Meaning of Soul"
2. "Ain't Got Nothin'"
3. "Whatever"

== Tour dates ==
List of 2008 concerts
Date	City	Country	Venue	Opening acts	Attendance	Revenue
26 August 2008	Seattle	United States	WaMu Theater	Matt Costa; Ryan Adams and the Cardinals		
27 August 2008	Vancouver	Canada	General Motors Place	Matt Costa; Ryan Adams and the Cardinals		
29 August 2008	Edmonton	Canada	Rexall Place	Matt Costa; Ryan Adams and the Cardinals	10,684	$598,507
30 August 2008	Calgary	Canada	Pengrowth Saddledome	Matt Costa; Ryan Adams and the Cardinals	11,563	$630,139
1 September 2008	Winnipeg	Canada	MTS Centre	Matt Costa; Ryan Adams and the Cardinals		
4 September 2008	Ottawa	Canada	Scotiabank Place	Matt Costa; Ryan Adams and the Cardinals		
5 September 2008	Montreal	Canada	Bell Centre	Matt Costa; Ryan Adams and the Cardinals		
7 September 2008 (Note: The 7 September 2008 concert in Toronto is a part of the Virgin Festival.)	Toronto	Canada	Toronto Islands Park			
7 October 2008	Liverpool	England	Echo Arena Liverpool			
8 October 2008	Liverpool	England	Echo Arena Liverpool			
10 October 2008	Sheffield	England	Sheffield Arena			
11 October 2008	Sheffield	England	Sheffield Arena			
13 October 2008	Birmingham	England	National Indoor Arena			
14 October 2008	Birmingham	England	National Indoor Arena			
16 October 2008	London	England	Wembley Arena			
17 October 2008	London	England	Wembley Arena			
20 October 2008	Bournemouth	England	Windsor Hall			
21 October 2008	Bournemouth	England	Windsor Hall			
23 October 2008	Cardiff	Wales	Cardiff International Arena			
24 October 2008	Cardiff	Wales	Cardiff International Arena			
26 October 2008 (Note: The 26 October 2008 concert in London is a part of the BBC Radio 2 Electric Proms.)	London	England	Roundhouse			
29 October 2008	Belfast	Ireland	Odyssey Arena			
30 October 2008	Belfast	Ireland	Odyssey Arena			
1 November 2008	Aberdeen	Scotland	Press & Journal Arena	Sergeant		
2 November 2008	Aberdeen	Scotland	Press & Journal Arena	Sergeant		
4 November 2008	Glasgow	Scotland	Scottish Exhibition and Conference Centre	Sergeant		
5 November 2008	Glasgow	Scotland	Scottish Exhibition and Conference Centre	Sergeant		
7 November 2008 (Note: The 7 November 2008 concert in Cologne was originally scheduled to take place on 29 September 2008.)	Cologne	Germany	Gloria Theatre	Howard Eliott Payne		
8 November 2008	Copenhagen	Denmark	Falkoner Theatre	Howard Eliott Payne		
10 November 2008 (Note: The 10 November 2008 concert in Paris was originally scheduled to take place on 30 September 2008.)	Paris	France	Bataclan	Howard Eliott Payne		
26 November 2008	Mexico City	Mexico	Palacio de los Deportes	The Secret Machines		
28 November 2008	Guadalajara	Mexico	Arena VFG	The Secret Machines		
29 November 2008	Monterrey	Mexico	Arena Monterrey	The Secret Machines		
3 December 2008	Oakland	United States	Oracle Arena	Matt Costa; Ryan Adams and the Cardinals		
4 December 2008	Los Angeles	United States	Staples Center	Matt Costa; Ryan Adams and the Cardinals	9,298	$580,472
6 December 2008	Las Vegas	United States	Pearl Concert Theater	Matt Costa; Ryan Adams and the Cardinals		
8 December 2008	Broomfield	United States	Broomfield Event Center	Matt Costa; Ryan Adams and the Cardinals	3,059	$169,346
10 December 2008	Minneapolis	United States	Target Center	Matt Costa; Ryan Adams and the Cardinals		
12 December 2008	Rosemont	United States	Allstate Arena	Matt Costa; Ryan Adams and the Cardinals	6,910	$420,659
13 December 2008	Auburn Hills	United States	The Palace of Auburn Hills	Matt Costa; Ryan Adams and the Cardinals		
15 December 2008 (Note: The 15 December 2008 concert in London, Ontario was originally scheduled to take place on 9 September 2008.)	London	Canada	John Labatt Centre	Matt Costa; Ryan Adams and the Cardinals	7,072	$346,145
17 December 2008	New York City	United States	Madison Square Garden	Matt Costa; Ryan Adams and the Cardinals	15,200	$777,050
19 December 2008	Camden	United States	Susquehanna Bank Center	Matt Costa; Ryan Adams and the Cardinals	5,405	$344,393
20 December 2008	Fairfax	United States	Patriot Center	Matt Costa; Ryan Adams and the Cardinals	6,538	$454,391

List of 2009 concerts
Date	City	Country	Venue	Opening acts
12 January 2009	Nantes	France	Zénith de Nantes Métropole	
13 January 2009	Brussels	Belgium	Forest National	
15 January 2009	Dresden	Germany	Messe Dresden	Twisted Wheel
16 January 2009	Hamburg	Germany	Alsterdorfer Sporthalle	Twisted Wheel
18 January 2009	Berlin	Germany	Arena Berlin	Twisted Wheel
21 January 2009	Amsterdam	Netherlands	Heineken Music Hall	
22 January 2009	Amsterdam	Netherlands	Heineken Music Hall	
24 January 2009	Copenhagen	Denmark	Forum Copenhagen	Caesars
25 January 2009	Gothenburg	Sweden	Scandinavium	Caesars
27 January 2009	Oslo	Norway	Oslo Spektrum	Caesars
28 January 2009	Stockholm	Sweden	Globe Arena	Caesars
30 January 2009	Lille	France	Zénith de Lille	
31 January 2009	Bordeaux	France	Espace Médoquine	
2 February 2009	Milan	Italy	Datchforum	
4 February 2009	Düsseldorf	Germany	Philips Halle	
12 February 2009	Madrid	Spain	Palacio de Deportes de la Comunidad	
13 February 2009	Badalona	Spain	Palau Municipal d'Esports de Badalona	
15 February 2009	Lisbon	Portugal	Pavilhão Atlântico	
17 February 2009	Toulouse	France	Zénith de Toulouse	
18 February 2009	Marseille	France	Le Dôme de Marseille	
20 February 2009	Rome	Italy	PalaLottomatica	
21 February 2009	Treviso	Italy	Palaverde	
23 February 2009	Bolzano	Italy	PalaOnda	
24 February 2009	Florence	Italy	Nelson Mandela Forum	
26 February 2009	Vienna	Austria	Wiener Stadthalle	
27 February 2009	Munich	Germany	The Zenith	
1 March 2009	Zürich	Switzerland	Hallenstadion	
3 March 2009	Paris	France	Palais Omnisports de Paris-Bercy	
18 March 2009	Nagoya	Japan	Nippon Gaishi Hall	
20 March 2009	Chiba	Japan	Makuhari Messe	
22 March 2009	Sapporo	Japan	Makomanai Ice Arena	
24 March 2009	Osaka	Japan	Intex Osaka	
25 March 2009	Osaka	Japan	Intex Osaka	
28 March 2009	Chiba	Japan	Makuhari Messe	
29 March 2009	Chiba	Japan	Makuhari Messe	
1 April 2009	Seoul	South Korea	Olympic Gymnastics Arena	
3 April 2009	Taipei	Taiwan	Taipei Nangang Exhibition Center	
5 April 2009	Singapore		Singapore Indoor Stadium	
7 April 2009	Hong Kong		AsiaWorld–Arena	
10 April 2009	Johannesburg	South Africa	Riversands Farm	
13 April 2009	Cape Town	South Africa	Lourensford Wine Estate	
28 April 2009	Caracas	Venezuela	Estadio de Fútbol de la USB	
30 April 2009	Lima	Peru	Estadio Nacional del Perú	
3 May 2009	Buenos Aires	Argentina	River Plate Stadium	
5 May 2009	Santiago	Chile	Movistar Arena	
7 May 2009	Rio de Janeiro	Brazil	Citibank Hall	
9 May 2009	São Paulo	Brazil	Arena Anhembi	
10 May 2009	Pinhais	Brazil	Expotrade Arena	
12 May 2009	Porto Alegre	Brazil	Gigantinho	
4 June 2009	Manchester	England	Heaton Park	Kasabian; The Enemy; Twisted Wheel
6 June 2009	Manchester	England	Heaton Park	Kasabian; The Enemy; Twisted Wheel
7 June 2009	Manchester	England	Heaton Park	Kasabian; The Enemy; Twisted Wheel
10 June 2009	Sunderland	England	Stadium of Light	Reverend And The Makers; The Enemy; Kasabian
12 June 2009	Cardiff	Wales	Millennium Stadium	The Peth
14 June 2009	Vienne, Isère	France	Théâtre Antique de Vienne	
17 June 2009	Edinburgh	Scotland	Murrayfield Stadium	Reverend And The Makers; The Enemy; Kasabian
20 June 2009	County Meath	Ireland	Slane Castle	
2 July 2009 (Note: The 2 July 2009 concert in Werchter is a part of Rock Werchter.)	Werchter	Belgium	Werchter Festival Grounds	
3 July 2009 (Note: The 3 July 2009 concert in Roskilde is a part of Roskilde Festival.)	Roskilde	Denmark	Darupvej	
7 July 2009	Coventry	England	Ricoh Arena	
9 July 2009	London	England	Wembley Stadium	Reverend And The Makers; The Enemy; Kasabian
11 July 2009	London	England	Wembley Stadium	Reverend And The Makers; The Enemy; Kasabian
12 July 2009	London	England	Wembley Stadium	Reverend And The Makers; The Enemy; Kasabian
14 July 2009 (Note: The 14 July 2009 concert in Cornwall is a part of the Eden Sessions. This show was originally scheduled to take place on 27 September 2008.)	Cornwall	England	Eden Project	
16 July 2009 (Note: The 16 July 2009 concert in Benicàssim is a part of Festival Internacional de Benicàssim.)	Benicàssim	Spain	Benicàssim Castellón	
18 July 2009 (Note: The 18 July 2009 concert in Bern is a part of Gurtenfestival.)	Bern	Switzerland	The Gurten	
19 July 2009 (Note: The 19 July 2009 concert in Gräfenhainichen is a part of Melt! Festival.)	Gräfenhainichen	Germany	Ferropolis	
21 July 2009 (Note: The 21 July 2009 concert in London is a part of the iTunes Festival.)	London	England	Roundhouse	
24 July 2009 (Note: The 24 July 2009 concert in Yuzawa is a part of the Fuji Rock Festival.)	Yuzawa	Japan	Naeba Ski Resort	
26 July 2009 (Note: The 26 July 2009 concert in Jisan is a part of the Jisan Valley Rock Festival.)	Icheon	South Korea	Jisan Valley Ski Resort	
20 August 2009	Bridlington	England	Bridlington Spa	
22 August 2009 (Note: The 22 August 2009 concert in Staffordshire is a part of V Festival.)	Staffordshire	England	Weston Park	

=== Cancelled shows ===
Date	City	Venue
12 September 2008	New York City	Terminal 5
25 November 2008	Mexico City	Palacio de los Deportes
23 August 2009	Chelmsford	Hylands Park (V Festival)
28 August 2009	Paris	Parc de Saint-Cloud (Rock en Seine)
29 August 2009	Konstanz	Bodenseestadion (Rock am See)
30 August 2009	Milan	Fiera Milano (I-Days Festival)
