= High Flying Birds Tour =

2011–12 concert tour by Noel Gallagher's High Flying Birds

- Tour by Noel Gallagher's High Flying Birds
- Associated album: Noel Gallagher's High Flying Birds
- Start date: 23 October 2011
- End date: 13 November 2012
- Legs: 11
- No. of shows: 68 in Europe; 40 in North America; 13 in Asia; 8 in Oceania; 7 in South America; 136 in Total

Noel Gallagher's High Flying Birds concert chronology
- High Flying Birds Tour (2011–12); Chasing Yesterday Tour (2015–16)

The High Flying Birds Tour was the debut concert tour by Noel Gallagher's High Flying Birds, which took place in 2011 and 2012. The tour was in promotion of the album Noel Gallagher's High Flying Birds.

== Background ==
The tour kicked off on 23 October with a sold out show at The Olympia Theatre in Dublin before moving onto Great Britain for a short theatre leg. The band then moved onto North America in November for a short run of shows in the United States and Canada before returning to mainland Europe for another show leg. The band will then make their way to Asia for two shows in Japan before heading to Oceania for some festival shows and two headlining shows in Sydney and Melbourne. In February 2012, he kicked off his biggest ever headlining solo shows with a full arena tour in venues across Ireland and Great Britain accompanied by the Crouch End Festival Chorus, Hertfordshire Chorus and a three piece brass section. The band returned once again to North America in March and April which also included appearances in Mexico, and in May a run of gigs in South America was followed by a return to Asia. Summer 2012 saw Noel Gallagher entering the eastern European bloc of Russia, Ukraine and Poland for the first time in his performing career. There was also support given to Red Hot Chili Peppers in front of 80,000 people at Croke Park in Dublin during the festival run.

== Support acts ==
- The Minutes – (Leg 1; Dublin)
- The Electric Soft Parade – (Leg 1; United Kingdom, select dates), (Leg 3; Europe, select dates)
- Murray James – (Leg 1; United Kingdom, select dates)
- Folks – (Leg 1; United Kingdom, select dates), (Leg 7; Europe, select dates)
- Cesar & Parker – (Leg 3; Europe, select date)
- Deep Sea Arcade – (Leg 6; Australia, Sydney)
- Immigrant Union – (Leg 6; Australia, Melbourne)
- Reverend and The Makers – (Leg 7; Manchester, Aberdeen, Glasgow, Sheffield, London & Birmingham)
- Cashier No.9 – (Leg 7; Dublin & Belfast)
- Kasabian – (Dublin; Marlay Park)
- The Cribs – (Dublin; Marlay Park)
- Maverick Sabre – (Dublin; Marlay Park)
- Snow Patrol – (Leg 11; North America)

== Set list ==
The band's typical setlist is:

1. "(It's Good) To Be Free"
2. "Mucky Fingers" replaced by D'Yer Wanna Be A Spaceman from 4 September 2012
3. "Everybody's on the Run"
4. "Dream On"
5. "If I Had a Gun..."
6. "The Good Rebel"
7. "The Death of You and Me"
8. "Freaky Teeth"
9. "Wonderwall" replaced by Whatever from February 2012
10. "Supersonic"
11. "D'Yer Wanna Be A Spaceman" replaced Mucky Fingers from 4 September 2012
12. "(I Wanna Live in a Dream in My) Record Machine"
13. "AKA... What a Life!"
14. "Talk Tonight"
15. "Soldier Boys and Jesus Freaks"
16. "AKA… Broken Arrow"
17. "Half the World Away"
18. "A Simple Game of Genius" 29 May 2012
19. "(Stranded On) The Wrong Beach"

Encore:

1. "Whatever" replaced Wonderwall from February 2012
2. "Little By Little"
3. "The Importance of Being Idle" replaced by Let the Lord Shine a Light on Me from May 2012 and moved to song No. 1 in the encore
4. "Don't Look Back in Anger"

Credits:

- All tracks written by Noel Gallagher

The setlist comprises around half and half of songs from the High Flying Birds album and from Noel Gallagher's Oasis back catalogue with new track "Freaky Teeth" being played without having an official release. At the beginning of the tour "Little By Little" and "Don’t Look Back in Anger" swapped positions in the encore with "Don't Look Back in Anger" being changed from an acoustic version to the last song with a full band version.

For the two Tokyo gigs in January 2012 an acoustic version of "Whatever" was added to the encore due to the popularity of the song in Japan and the song was also played in Melbourne. "Whatever" was added permanently to the setlist in place of "Wonderwall" when the band returned to Europe in March 2012 although "Whatever" was instead played as the first song of a four-song encore, this version of "Whatever" was played with the full band.

In May 2012 the band played the B-Side "Let the Lord Shine a Light on Me" for the first time.

On 29 May 2012, the same day of Gallagher's birthday, the band played the digital download edition and Japanese bonus track "A Simple Game of Genius" for the first time.

On 4 September 2012, Gallagher played "D'Yer Wanna Be A Spaceman" for the first time, he has continued to play the song since including it in the setlist for the iTunes Festival gig and has subsequently replaced the song "Mucky Fingers" with it. He plays the song in his acoustic set with a majority of his band.

On 9 November "Idler's Dream" was performed for the first time.

== Song statistics ==
In total, the band performed 34 different songs across the tour.

Song	Number of performances
"AKA... What a Life!"	136
"Talk Tonight"	135
"Half the World Away"	135
"If I Had a Gun..."	135
"Don't Look Back In Anger"	135
"(It's Good) To Be Free"	134
"Everybody's on the Run"	133
"Dream On"	133
"(Stranded On) The Wrong Beach"	133
"The Death of You and Me"	130
"AKA... Broken Arrow"	129
"(I Wanna Live in a Dream In My) Record Machine"	126
"Little by Little"	108
"Supersonic"	101
"Whatever"	94
"The Good Rebel"	89
"Freaky Teeth"	88
"Soldier Boys and Jesus Freaks"	85
"Mucky Fingers"	84
"The Importance of Being Idle"	60
"Wonderwall"	39
"Let the Lord Shine a Light on Me"	32
"D'Yer Wanna Be a Spaceman?"	18
"A Simple Game of Genius"	3
"Idler's Dream"	2
"Angel Child"	2
"Don't Think Twice, It's All Right"	1

== Tour dates ==
Date	City	Country	Venue
Europe
23 October 2011	Dublin	Ireland	Olympia Theatre
26 October 2011	Manchester	England	O2 Apollo Manchester
27 October 2011	Edinburgh	Scotland	Usher Hall
29 October 2011	London	England	Hammersmith Apollo
30 October 2011	London	England	HMV Forum
31 October 2011	London	England	The Roundhouse
North America
5 November 2011	Toronto	Canada	Virgin Mobile Mod Club
7 November 2011	Toronto	Canada	Massey Hall
8 November 2011	Toronto	Canada	Massey Hall
11 November 2011	Philadelphia	United States	Academy of Music
12 November 2011	Boston	United States	Wang Theatre
14 November 2011	New York City	United States	Beacon Theatre
15 November 2011	New York City	United States	Beacon Theatre
17 November 2011	Los Angeles	United States	Royce Hall Auditorium
18 November 2011	Los Angeles	United States	Royce Hall Auditorium
19 November 2011	San Francisco	United States	Orpheum Theatre
Europe
26 November 2011	Madrid	Spain	La Riviera
28 November 2011	Milan	Italy	Discoteca Alcatraz Milano
30 November 2011	Amsterdam	Netherlands	Melkweg
1 December 2011	Brussels	Belgium	Ancienne Belgique
3 December 2011	Copenhagen	Denmark	Copenhagen Concert Hall
4 December 2011	Cologne	Germany	Palladium
6 December 2011	Paris	France	Casino de Paris
North America
10 December 2011	San Diego	United States	91X The Wrex Halls
11 December 2011	Los Angeles	United States	Gibson Amphitheatre
Asia
16 January 2012	Tokyo	Japan	Tokyo Dome City Hall
17 January 2012	Tokyo	Japan	Tokyo Dome City Hall
Oceania
20 January 2012^{[A]}	Auckland	New Zealand	Mount Smart Stadium
22 January 2012^{[A]}	Gold Coast	Australia	Gold Coast Parklands
23 January 2012	Sydney	Australia	Enmore Theatre
26 January 2012^{[A]}	Sydney	Australia	Sydney Showground
29 January 2012^{[A]}	Melbourne	Australia	Flemington Racecourse
31 January 2012	Melbourne	Australia	Palais Theatre
3 February 2012^{[A]}	Adelaide	Australia	Adelaide Showgrounds
5 February 2012^{[A]}	Perth	Australia	Claremont Showground
Europe
13 February 2012	Manchester	England	Manchester Arena
14 February 2012	Aberdeen	Scotland	Press & Journal Arena
16 February 2012	Belfast	Northern Ireland	Odyssey Arena
17 February 2012	Dublin	Ireland	The O2
19 February 2012	Sheffield	England	Motorpoint Arena Sheffield
23 February 2012	Newcastle	England	Metro Radio Arena
24 February 2012	Glasgow	Scotland	Scottish Exhibition and Conference Centre
26 February 2012	London	England	The O2 Arena
1 March 2012	Birmingham	England	National Indoor Arena
4 March 2012	Barcelona	Spain	Razzmatazz
6 March 2012	Paris	France	Le Grand Rex
8 March 2012	Hamburg	Germany	Alsterdorfer Sporthalle
9 March 2012	Berlin	Germany	Max-Schmeling-Halle
11 March 2012	Munich	Germany	Tonhalle
13 March 2012	Rome	Italy	Atlántico Live
15 March 2012	Zürich	Switzerland	Komplex 457
North America
28 March 2012	Washington, D.C.	United States	Warner Theatre
29 March 2012	Columbus	United States	Lifestyle Communities Pavilion
31 March 2012	Detroit	United States	Royal Oak Music Theatre
1 April 2012	Chicago	United States	Riviera Theatre
3 April 2012	Milwaukee	United States	Pabst Theater
4 April 2012	Indianapolis	United States	Murat Shrine
6 April 2012	Atlanta	United States	The Tabernacle
10 April 2012	Mexico City	Mexico	Teatro Metropólitan
11 April 2012	Mexico City	Mexico	Teatro Metropólitan
14 April 2012^{[B]}	Indio	United States	Empire Polo Club
17 April 2012	San Diego	United States	Balboa Theatre
18 April 2012	Phoenix	United States	Orpheum Theatre
20 April 2012	Las Vegas	United States	Pearl Concert Theater
21 April 2012^{[B]}	Indio	United States	Empire Polo Club
South America
2 May 2012	São Paulo	Brazil	Espaço das Américas
3 May 2012	Rio de Janeiro	Brazil	Vivo Rio
5 May 2012	Córdoba	Argentina	Orfeo Superdomo
6 May 2012	Buenos Aires	Argentina	Estadio G.E.B.A.
8 May 2012	Asunción	Paraguay	Jockey Club del Paraguay
11 May 2012	Lima	Peru	Estadio San Marcos (North Tribune)
13 May 2012	Santiago	Chile	Teatro Caupolicán
Asia
23 May 2012	Tokyo	Japan	Nippon Budokan
24 May 2012	Nagoya	Japan	Aichi Arts Center
26 May 2012	Osaka	Japan	Osaka Municipal Central Gymnasium
28 May 2012	Seoul	South Korea	AX Hall
29 May 2012	Seoul	South Korea	AX Hall
Europe
11 June 2012^{[C]}	Moscow	Russia	Tushino Airfield
13 June 2012	Kyiv	Ukraine	International Exhibition Centre
14 June 2012^{[D]}	Hultsfred	Sweden	Lake Hulingen
15 June 2012^{[E]}	Aarhus	Denmark	Ådalen
20 June 2012^{[F]}	Gdańsk	Poland	Plac Zebrań Ludowych
22 June 2012^{[G]}	Scheeßel	Germany	Scheeßel Festival Ground
23 June 2012^{[H]}	Tuttlingen	Germany	Take Off Park
24 June 2012^{[I]}	Newport	England	Seaclose Park
26 June 2012^{[J]}	Dublin	Ireland	Croke Park
29 June 2012^{[K]}	Oslo	Norway	Holmenkollbakken
1 July 2012^{[L]}	Werchter	Belgium	Werchter Festival Grounds
4 July 2012^{[M]}	Montreux	Switzerland	Stravinsky Auditorium
5 July 2012^{[N]}	Milan	Italy	Fiera di Rho
7 July 2012^{[O]}	Kinross	Scotland	Balado Airfield
10 July 2012^{[P]}	Argelès-sur-Mer	France	Argelès-sur-Mer Festival Grounds
12 July 2012^{[Q]}	Bern	Switzerland	Gurten Mountain
13 July 2012^{[R]}	Aix-les-Bains	France	Esplanade du Lac
14 July 2012^{[S]}	Benicàssim	Spain	Benicàssim Festival Grounds
17 July 2012	Edinburgh	Scotland	Edinburgh Castle
Asia
28 July 2012^{[T]}	Naeba	Japan	Naeba Ski Resort
Europe
16 August 2012^{[U]}	Sankt Pölten	Austria	Green Park St Polten
18 August 2012^{[V]}	Chelmsford	England	Hylands Park
19 August 2012^{[V]}	Staffordshire	England	Weston Park
20 August 2012^{[W]}	Belfast	Northern Ireland	Custom House Square
23 August 2012	Dublin	Ireland	Marlay Park
24 August 2012^{[X]}	Paris	France	Domaine National de Saint-Cloud
2 September 2012^{[Y]}	Trinity	Jersey	Royal Jersey Showground
4 September 2012	Bournemouth	England	Bournemouth International Centre
6 September 2012	Liverpool	England	Echo Arena Liverpool
7 September 2012	London	England	Wembley Arena
9 September 2012	Cardiff	Wales	Motorpoint Arena Cardiff
10 September 2012	Nottingham	England	Capital FM Arena
12 September 2012^{[Z]}	London	England	The Roundhouse
Asia
20 September 2012	Bangkok	Thailand	BITEC Hall 106
22 September 2012^{[AA]}	Marina Bay	Singapore	Padang Stage, Singapore Street Circuit
23 September 2012^{[AB]}	Marina Bay	Singapore	Village Stage, Singapore Street Circuit
25 September 2012	Kowloon Bay	Hong Kong	Star Hall
27 September 2012^{[AB]}	Taipei	Taiwan	Taipei World Trade Center
Europe
3 October 2012	Düsseldorf	Germany	Mitsubishi Electric Halle
5 October 2012	Florence	Italy	Teatro Obihall
6 October 2012	Bologna	Italy	PalaDozza
8 October 2012	Offenbach	Germany	Capitol Theatre
9 October 2012	Lille	France	L'Aéronef
11 October 2012	Lyon	France	Le Transbordeur
12 October 2012	Toulouse	France	Le Bikini
North America
23 October 2012	Portland	United States	Arlene Schnitzer Concert Hall
24 October 2012	Seattle	United States	WaMu Theater
25 October 2012	Vancouver	Canada	Rogers Arena
27 October 2012	Edmonton	Canada	Edmonton Expo Centre
28 October 2012	Calgary	Canada	Stampede Corral
30 October 2012	Winnipeg	Canada	Centennial Concert Hall
31 October 2012	Saint Paul	United States	Roy Wilkins Auditorium
1 November 2012	Kansas City	United States	Midland Theatre
3 November 2012	Hammond	United States	The Venue at Horseshoe
4 November 2012	Louisville	United States	The Louisville Palace
5 November 2012	Nashville	United States	Ryman Auditorium
7 November 2012	Grand Prairie	United States	Verizon Theatre
8 November 2012	Austin	United States	Austin Music Hall
9 November 2012	Houston	United States	Bayou Music Centre
Europe
13 November 2012	London	England	O_{2} Shepherd's Bush Empire

Festivals and other miscellaneous performances

^{A} This concert was a part of "Big Day Out"
^{B} This concert was a part of "Coachella Valley Music and Arts Festival"
^{C} This concert was a part of "Maxidrom Festival"
^{D} This concert was a part of "Hultsfred Festival"
^{E} This concert was a part of "NorthSide Festival"
^{F} This concert was a part of "Gdańsk Festival"
^{G} This concert was a part of "Hurricane Festival"
^{H} This concert was a part of "Southside Festival"
^{I} This concert was a part of "Isle of Wight Festival"
^{J} The band supported the Red Hot Chili Peppers at this concert
^{K} This concert was a part of "Sommerfestivalen"
^{L} This concert was a part of "Rock Werchter"
^{M} This concert was a part of "Montreux Jazz Festival"
^{N} This concert was a part of "Heineken Jammin' Festival"

^{O} This concert was a part of "T in the Park"
^{P} This concert was a part of "Les Déferlantes Festival"
^{Q} This concert was a part of "Gurtenfestival"
^{R} This concert was a part of "Musilac 2012"
^{S} This concert was a part of "FIB Benicàssim"
^{T} This concert was a part of "Fuji Rock Festival"
^{U} This concert was a part of "Frequency Festival"
^{V} This concert was a part of "V Festival"
^{W} This concert was a part of "Belsonic"
^{X} This concert was a part of "Rock en Seine"
^{Y} This concert was a part of "Jersey Live"
^{Z} This concert was a part of "iTunes Festival"
^{AA} This concert was a part of the "SingTel Singapore Grand Prix"
^{AB} This concert was a part of the "TWinkle Rock Festival"

=== Box office score data ===
Venue	City	Tickets sold / available	Gross revenue
Olympia Theatre	Dublin	1,600 / 1,600 (100%)	$98,286
Wang Theatre	Boston	2,805 / 3,561 (79%)	$122,757
Royce Hall Auditorium	Los Angeles	3,260 / 3,260 (100%)	$163,590
Orpheum Theatre	San Francisco	1,572 / 2,197 (72%)	$87,468
Manchester Arena	Manchester	14,967 / 15,250 (98%)	$1,108,660
Odyssey Arena	Belfast	9,700 / 9,700 (100%)	$497,360
The O_{2}	Dublin	12,681 / 12,681 (100%)	$607,828
The O_{2} Arena	London	17,235 / 17,848 (97%)	$1,266,890
LC Pavilion	Columbus	1,200 / 1,200 (100%)	$48,655
Royal Oak Music Theatre	Detroit	1,700 / 1,700 (100%)	$68,100
Riviera Theatre	Chicago	2,293 / 2,293 (100%)	$100,892
Teatro Metropolitan	Mexico City	5,326 / 6,248 (85%)	$342,112
Balboa Theatre	San Diego	1,340 / 1,340 (100%)	$47,750
Espaco das Americas	São Paulo	4,320 / 4,320 (100%)	$342,840
Vivo Rio	Rio de Janeiro	3,839 / 3,839 (100%)	$267,731
Jockey Club	Asunción	6,813 / 8,000 (85%)	$268,207
Estadio Universidad San Marcos	Lima	2,912 / 5,000 (58%)	$176,648
TOTAL		93,563 / 100,037 (94%)	$5,615,774

== Credits ==
=== Band ===
- Noel Gallagher: Lead vocals & Guitar
- Russ Pritchard: Bass & Vocals
- Tim Smith: Guitar & Vocals
- Mikey Rowe: Keyboards
- Jeremy Stacey: Drums

=== Crew ===
- Doe Phillips: Tour Manager
- Michael O'Connor: Production Manager
- Roni Horner: Production Coordinator
- Kevin Fallows: Tour Security
- Jason Rhodes: Guitar & Bass Technician
- Mickey Winder: Guitar & Drums Technician
- Ben Leach: Keyboard Technician & Additional Keyboards
- Antony King: Front of House Engineer
- Nahuel Gutierrez: Monitor Engineer
- David "Fuji" Convertino: Lighting Designer
- Phil Smith: DJ
- Scully: Merchandiser
- Luke Chadwick: Sound Technician (London)
- Barry Macleod: Sound Technician (Europe)
- Vince Buller: Sound Technician (USA East Coast)
- Chris Malmgren: Sound Technician (USA West Coast)

=== Management ===
- Ignition Management
- Marcus Russell
- Alec McKinlay
- Kat Killingley
- Natalie Hicks
- Ray McCarville
- Carly Garrod
- Fiona Melville
- Karin Struijk
