= Live at the O2 Arena =

Live at the O2 Arena, Live at the O2, or Live from the O2, may refer to any of the following albums or videos filmed at The O2 Arena in London:

- Tangled Up: Live from the O2 2008, album by Girls Aloud
- Out of Control: Live from the O2 2009, album by Girls Aloud
- Live at the O2 London, England, 2009 video by Kings of Leon
- Live at the O² Arena, 2009 album by Katie Melua
- The Labyrinth Tour: Live from the O2, 2010 album by Leona Lewis
- Pandemonium: Live at the O2 Arena, London, 21st December 2009, 2010 album by Pet Shop Boys
- The Where We Are Tour: Live from The O2, 2010 video by Westlife
- A Million Lights – Live at the O2, 2012 video by Cheryl
- International Magic Live at the O2, 2012 video by Noel Gallagher's High Flying Birds
- Loud Tour Live at the O2, 2012 video by Rihanna
- Robbie Williams: Live at the O2, 2012 album by Robbie Williams
- Live at the O2 Arena + Rarities, 2017 album by Alter Bridge
- Live from the O2 London, 2025 album by the Jonas Brothers

== See also ==
- Live at the O2 Apollo Manchester 2017, by Anastacia
- Live From O2 Academy Brixton, by DMA's
