= High Flying Bird (disambiguation) =

High Flying Bird is a 2019 American sport drama film.

High Flying Bird can also refer to:

- "High Flying Bird" (song), a song by Billy Edd Wheeler first recorded by Judy Henske in 1963
- "High Flying Bird", a song by Elton John on the 1973 album Don't Shoot Me I'm Only the Piano Player
- High Flying Birds, a rock band led by Noel Gallagher
  - High Flying Birds, the 2011 debut album by the band
  - High Flying Birds Tour, the 2011 tour showcasing the album
