= P&J Live =

Multi-purpose indoor arena in Bucksburn, Aberdeen, Scotland

- The Event Complex Aberdeen (TECA)

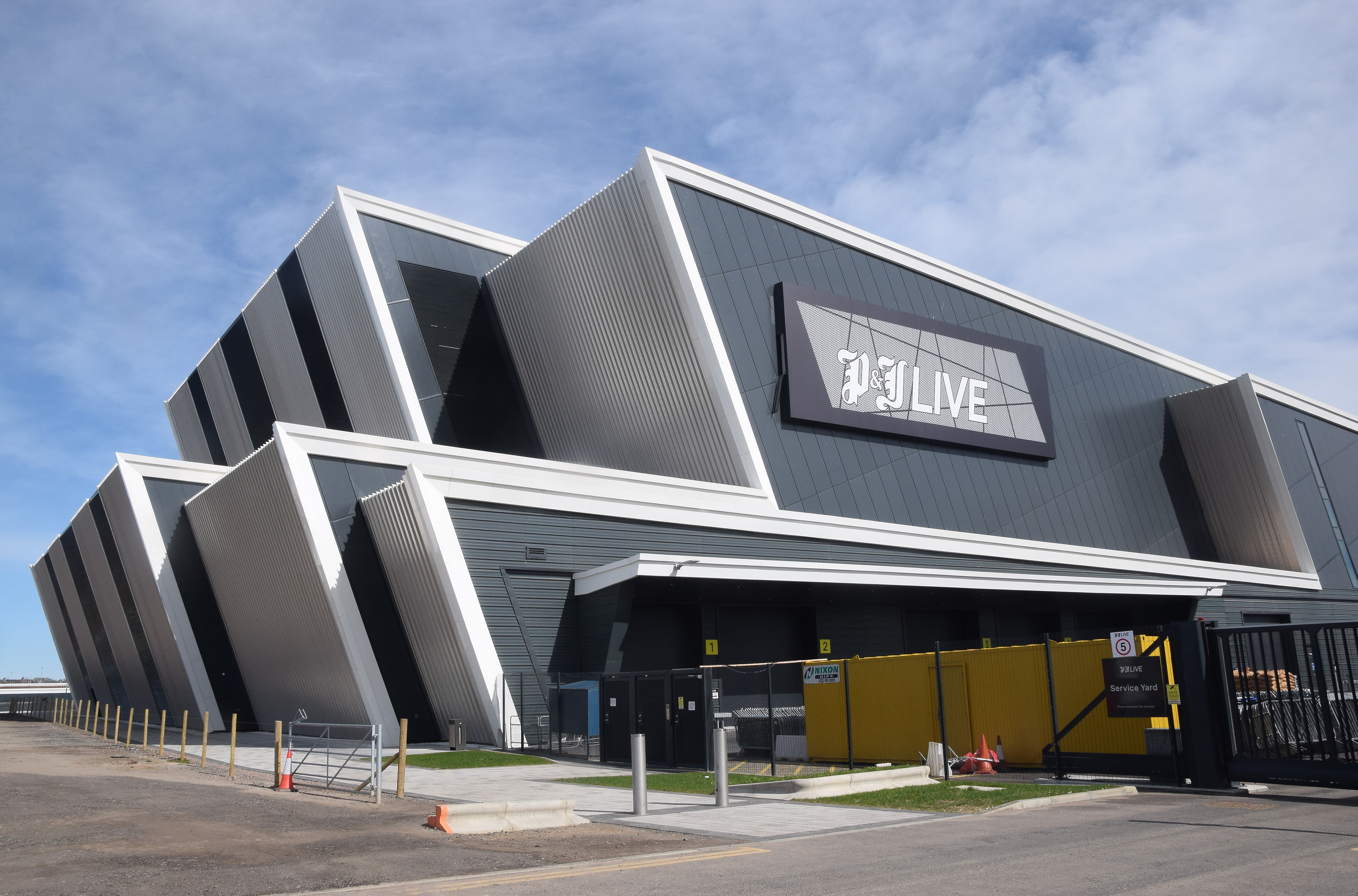
- The P&J Live building
- Interactive map of P&J Live
- Location: Aberdeen, Scotland
- Coordinates: 57°11′7″N 2°11′35″W
- Owner: Aberdeen City Council
- Operator: Legends Global
- Capacity: 12,500–15,000 (with standing); 10,264 (all seated)

Construction
- Groundbreaking: 5 July 2016
- Opened: 10 August 2019
- Cost: £333 million
- Architect: Keppie
- Project manager: Turner & Townsend
- Structural engineers: Blyth & Blyth
- Main contractor: Robertson

Website
- www.pandjlive.com

P&J Live (also known as The Event Complex Aberdeen) is a multi-purpose indoor arena in Aberdeen, Scotland. Opened in August 2019, it offers a capacity for all types of shows and events from 5,000 to 15,000. Replacing the former Aberdeen Exhibition and Conference Centre (AECC), the 10,000-seat arena is used for concerts and other events.

It is the largest indoor arena in Scotland, as well as the fifth largest arena in the United Kingdom.

== History ==
General view of the complex (2020)

In September 2012, talks got underway to replace the 27-year-old AECC Arena with a new £20 million facility on the same site amid claims that the arena was missing out on big acts due its comparatively small 4,750-seat capacity.

On 18 October 2013, Aberdeen City Council announced plans to spend £200 million on a rebuild of the AECC, but also raised the possibility of relocating the venue to a new site. Then on 31 October, it was announced that the go ahead had been given to the relocation, with Henry Boot as the preferred development partner. Artists impressions were released for a new centre and arena to be built at The Rowett Institute, which was owned by the University of Aberdeen and located in the city's Bucksburn area near Aberdeen Airport and close to the Aberdeen International Business Park.

According to Aberdeen City Council, the venue was to be completed by 2019 and would accommodate 10,000 people seated and 12,500 standing. Other facilities would include office and leisure space, plus an adjoining 4-star Hilton Aberdeen TECA hotel with options for two more. An artist's impression of the new AECC was released on 1 November 2013, together with an estimate of the final bill at around £185 million.

In September 2014, public consultations took place prior to the final planning application being submitted in May 2015 for the Bucksburn site and redevelopment of the AECC site at Bridge of Don. Construction began in July 2016, after a ground-breaking ceremony on 5 July and demolition of the old Rowett Institute buildings was completed by early 2017.

The planned spending total of the project was around £333 million and in July 2018, it was announced that the new venue would be named The Event Complex Aberdeen (TECA). The official name was changed to P&J Live in May 2019, following a sponsorship deal with the venue’s operator SMG Europe and DC Thomson (owners of The Press and Journal and Evening Express).

Constructed by the Robertson Group, the main arena includes an exclusive 50 person capacity show deck, 16 private hospitality suites and a VIP lounge. The new building also contains seven conference spaces, three 2,000 sqm exhibition halls (each with a seated capacity of 1,700), eleven meeting rooms, 150-seat restaurant and a coffee shop. The development also comprises two on site hotels. The open day was held on 10 August 2019.

== Events ==
The first event at the new arena was Offshore Europe from 3–6 September 2019. On 17 September 2019, it was announced that P&J Live would host the 2019 edition of BBC Sports Personality of the Year on 15 December. On 23 November 2019, Scottish singer Gerry Cinnamon performed a sold-out concert at the venue to a crowd of 15,000 people, making it the largest indoor concert ever held in Scotland.

In 2021, during the COVID-19 pandemic, the venue was used as a vaccination centre.

=== Entertainment ===
Events at P&J Live
Date	Event	Tour
2019
3 September	Offshore Europe	SPE Offshore Europe 2019
4 September	Offshore Europe	SPE Offshore Europe 2019
5 September	Offshore Europe	SPE Offshore Europe 2019
6 September	Offshore Europe	SPE Offshore Europe 2019
20 September	Russell Howard	Respite
5 October	Alice Cooper	Ol’ Black Eyes Is Back
31 October	Disney on Ice	N/A
1 November	Disney on Ice	N/A
2 November	Disney on Ice	N/A
3 November	Disney on Ice	N/A
7 November	Catfish and the Bottlemen	The Balance Tour
10 November	WWE Live	
14 November	Liam Gallagher	
21 November	Jack Whitehall	Stood Up
23 November	Gerry Cinnamon	Gerry Cinnamon Live 2019
27 November	Michael Bublé	An Evening with Michael Bublé
28 November	Michael Bublé	An Evening with Michael Bublé
7 December	Rod Stewart	Red Blood Roses Tour
15 December	BBC Sports Personality of the Year	
2020
21 January	Strictly Come Dancing Live!	Live Tour
22 January	Strictly Come Dancing Live!	Live Tour
6 February	Unibet Premier League Darts	2020 Premier League Darts
11 February	Subsea Expo	Subsea Expo 2020
12 February	Subsea Expo	Subsea Expo 2020
13 February	Subsea Expo	Subsea Expo 2020
23 February	Michael Ball and Alfie Boe	Back Together Tour
29 February	The 1975	Notes on a Conditional Form Tour
2 March	Whitney Houston	Whitney Houston Hologram Tour
6 March	AJ Pritchard	AJ Live 2020
10 March	Stereophonics	Kind Tour
13 March	The Script	Sunset and Full Moons 2020
15 March	Lewis Capaldi	Lewis Capaldi UK Arena Tour
19 March	Cirque du Soleil	Crystal
20 March	Cirque du Soleil	Crystal
21 March	Cirque du Soleil	Crystal
22 March	Cirque du Soleil	Crystal
11 April	BrewDog	AGM2020
6 May	RuPaul’s Drag Race	Werq the World
8 May	Bryan Adams	
13 August	Simple Minds	40 Year Of Hits Tour!
31 October	Deacon Blue	City Of Love
2022
November 17	Westlife	The Wild Dreams Tour
2023
11 February	Justin Bieber	Justice World Tour
13 June	Elton John	Farewell Yellow Brick Road
15 June	Elton John	Farewell Yellow Brick Road
21 June	Pet Shop Boys	Dreamworld: The Greatest Hits Live
2024
4 June	Girls Aloud	The Girls Aloud Show
8 November	Rogue Invitational	2024 Rogue Invitational
9 November	Rogue Invitational	2024 Rogue Invitational
10 November	Rogue Invitational	2024 Rogue Invitational

== See also ==
- Aberdeen Exhibition and Conference Centre
