= Offshore Europe =

Founded in 1973 as Offshore Scotland, SPE Offshore Europe is a biennial conference and exhibition that takes place in Aberdeen, Scotland. The event focuses on upstream oil and gas production and has grown into one of the largest events of its kind in Europe. The event attracts visitors and exhibitors from around the world; 119 countries were represented at the 2019 event.

== Areas of Industry ==
The exhibition is held across multiple halls at P&J Live with large temporary structures constructed to accommodate such a large number of exhibitors. Exhibits are dedicated to a specific area of the industry that is of particular interest at the time, with a focus on energy transition. Zones featured include deep-water and Intelligent Energy, which was so popular it developed into its own event. In 2017 hall 6 featured the Decommissioning Zone for the first time in collaboration with industry association Decom North Sea.

== Local Impact ==
The event brings a large influx of visitors to the city with OE2007 bringing an estimated £25m to the local economy.

== Records ==
- Attendees - over 63,000 in 2013
- Exhibitors - 1,542 in 2015
- Countries Represented - 119 in 2019

== Notable attendees ==
- Margaret Thatcher, the then Prime Minister opened the 1985 event in the new venue the AECC
- Alex Salmond, the Leader of the Scottish National Party attended the 1999 event and spoke at the gala opening in 2013
- George Osborne, the then Chancellor of the Exchequer spoke in the Opening Plenary Session in 2013
- Anne, Princess Royal, attended in 2013 to encourage more females to enter the industry
- Brian Cox, spoke in the Opening Plenary Session in 2015
- Martin Reid, 1985
