= Alfie Linehan =

Irish cricketer (1940–2019)

Personal information
- Born: 20 April 1940; Dublin, Ireland
- Died: 25 June 2019 (aged 79)
- Batting: Right-handed

International information
- National side: Ireland

Career statistics
Competition	First-class
Matches	2
Runs scored	29
Batting average	7.25
100s/50s	0/0
Top score	16
Catches/stumpings	2/0
- Source: Cricinfo, 26 June 2019

Alphonsus James Linehan (20 April 1940 – 25 June 2019) was an Irish cricketer. A right-handed batsman, he played eleven times for the Ireland cricket team between 1971 and 1975 including two first-class matches against Scotland.

== Playing career ==
Alfie Linehan first played for Ireland in August 1971, making his debut against the Combined Services, and playing against Denmark a few days later. His first-class debut came the following year, against Scotland in June 1972, before a match against Wales in August of that year.

He played a match for Ireland against Canada at the Toronto Cricket, Skating and Curling Club in September 1973, before four games in 1974; against the Netherlands, the MCC, Scotland and Wales. The match against Scotland was his second and final first-class appearance.

He played against the MCC at Lord's in June 1975, before his final match for Ireland, against Denmark in Ringsted the following month. He later served as president of the Irish Cricket Union in 1993.

=== Statistics ===
In all matches for Ireland, Linehan scored 262 runs at an average of 15.41, with a top score of 61 not out against Denmark in his second match, his only half-century for Ireland. He never bowled for Ireland.
