= Aberdeen Exhibition and Conference Centre =

Convention centre in Aberdeen, Scotland

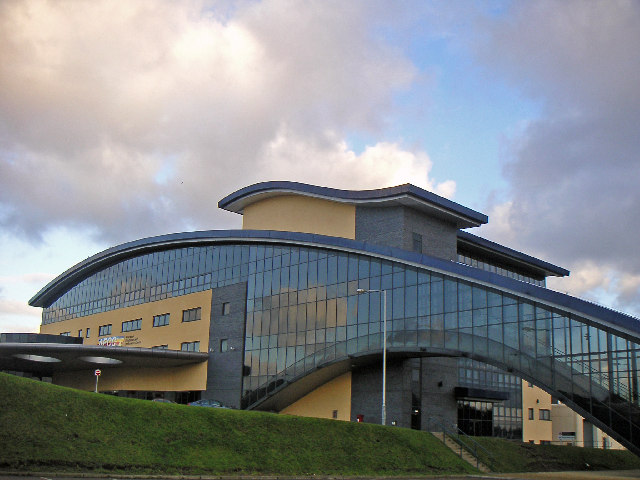
- Entrance to main building (December 2005)
- Interactive map of Aberdeen Exhibition and Conference Centre
- Address: Bridge of Don; Aberdeen AB23 8BL; Scotland
- Coordinates: 57°11′11″N 2°5′14″W
- Owner: Aberdeen City Council

Construction
- Opened: 1985
- Renovated: 2003
- Expanded: 2003
- Closed: June 2019
- Demolished: 2020 (arena)

The Aberdeen Exhibition and Conference Centre (also known as the General Electric Exhibition Centre and often shortened to the AECC) was a large exhibition and conference complex, in the suburb of Bridge of Don, in Aberdeen, Scotland. The complex is home to a Holiday Inn and Holiday Inn Express hotel, conference facilities and multi-purpose arena which hosted concerts and local sporting events, including the Aberdeen Cup tennis event.

The BHGE Arena (formerly the AECC Arena (1985–2002), Press & Journal Arena (2002–2012), and the GE Oil and Gas Arena (2012–2017)) was an indoor arena with a standing capacity of 8,500 and 4,750 seated for concerts and up to 8,000 for other events. The sponsorship lasted until 2019 when the arena was closed and replaced with a new arena at TECA.

== History ==
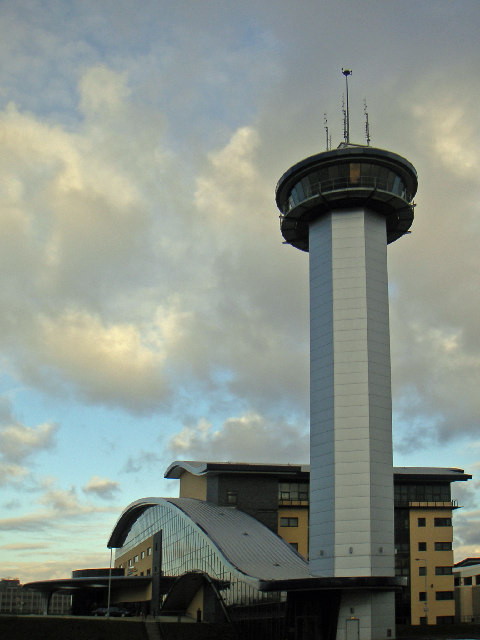
The observation tower (December 2005)

In 2003, the AECC underwent a major refurbishment, with the conference facilities being completely re-built. As part of the redevelopment, a large viewing tower was constructed and is one of the tallest structures in Aberdeen.

=== Events ===
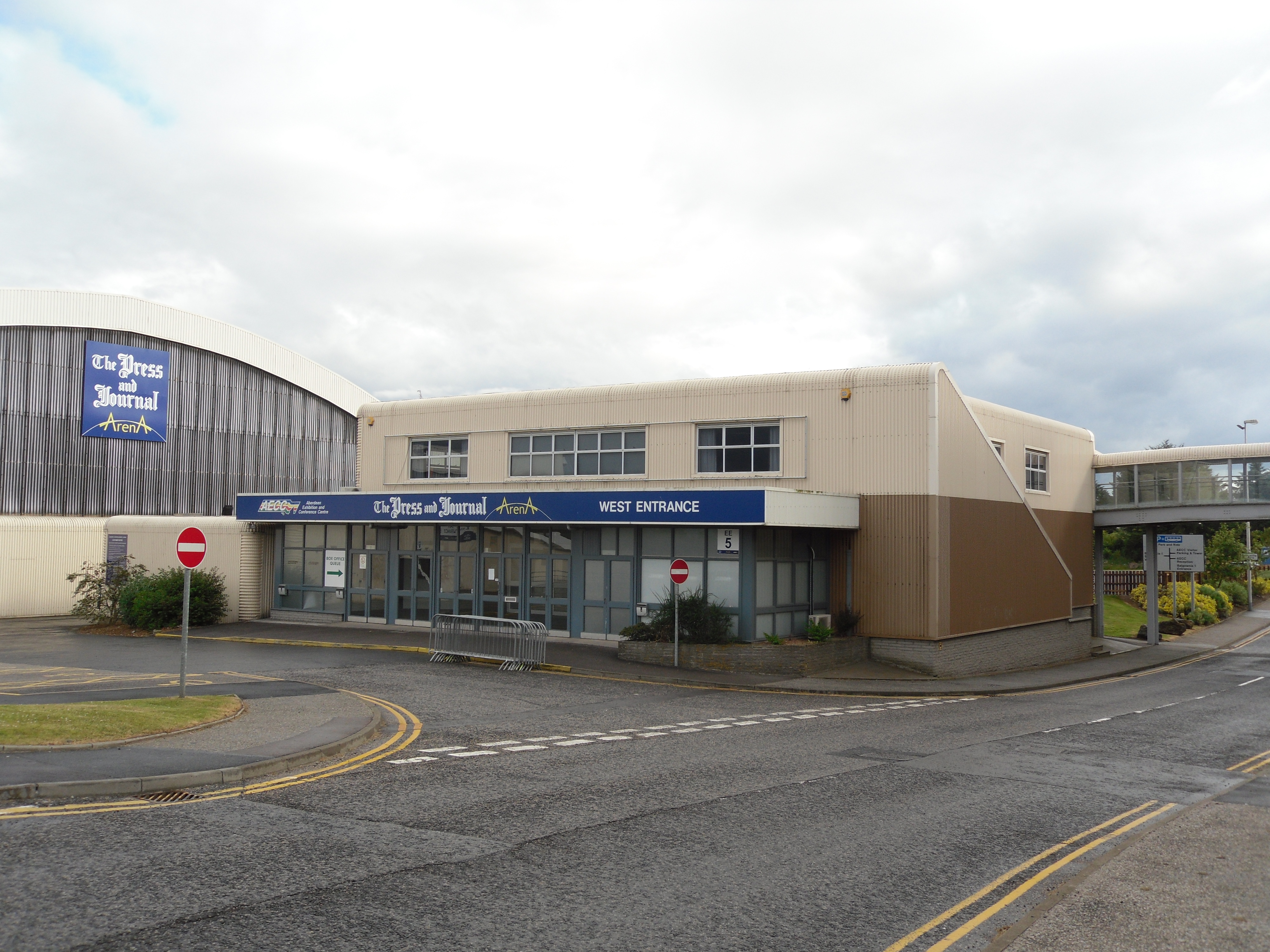
West entrance to arena (July 2010)

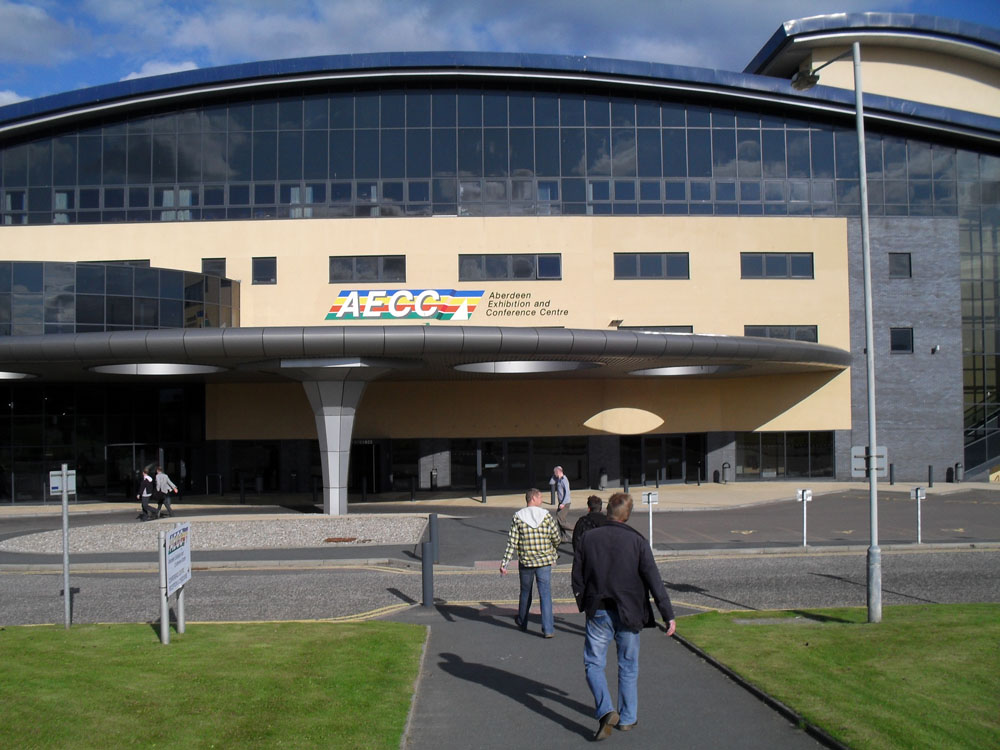
The main entrance in July 2011

Oasis have played several times over the years – their first being two performances on the 19–20 September 1997. They returned for another two gigs on the 9–10 September 2002 and once more on 12 December 2005. They performed their most recent, and probably last concerts at the venue on the 1–2 November 2008. All these gigs were sold out in a matter of minutes. Noel Gallagher returned to the venue on 14 February 2012 as part of his High Flying Birds Tour. The concert was a sell-out.

Iron Maiden, Neil Young and AC/DC are some the biggest acts in its history when AC/DC played in 1996, Young in 2009 and Iron Maiden in 2011, 2017 and 2018

On the start of the national 8-city UK tour in 1998, the first UK performance of Barney's Big Surprise featuring Barney, Baby Bop, and BJ was held here.

On 15 June 2014, American country star Dolly Parton performed a sold-out concert at the venue. The concert sold out in less than 10 minutes from going on sale.

Within the last decade it has hosted major international acts including the likes of Westlife, Steps, Kylie Minogue, blink-182, Rihanna, The Prodigy, Fall Out Boy, My Chemical Romance, Foo Fighters, Jay-Z, 50 Cent, The Killers, Hey Ocean, Katy Perry and Paramore, as well as comedians such as Frankie Boyle, Ricky Tomlinson, Peter Kay, Michael McIntyre and Russell Howard.

One Direction have also played the AECC as part of The X Factor Live Tour 2011.

Since 2006, it has played host to the Premier League Darts.

The arena has also played host to WWE wrestling events, Torville and Dean, Disney on Ice, World Snooker's Grand Prix Championship, The X Factor Live Tour and The Britain's Got Talent Live Tour.

The AECC also hosted many trade conference and exhibitions the largest of which is the biennial SPE Offshore Europe the oil and gas exhibition and conference that which place on alternate years in September.

The final event ever held at the AECC was an outdoor performance by Rod Stewart on July 15, 2019. The performance was originally scheduled for June 12, 2019, but this was cancelled due to dangerous weather conditions.

=== Replacement centre ===
The Event Complex Aberdeen (TECA) opened in August 2019, replacing the AECC.

=== Post-closure ===
Demolition of the arena began in March 2020. Part of the centre, facing on to Ellon Road, was purchased by a church in September for £1.8 million. In October 2021, it was reported that the land where the arena once stood would be redeveloped for housing.
