= If I Had a Gun... =

Single by Noel Gallagher's High Flying Birds

from the album Noel Gallagher's High Flying Birds
- B-side: "I'd Pick You Every Time"
- Released: 26 December 2011
- Genre: Rock
- Length: 4:18
- Label: Sour Mash
- Songwriter: Noel Gallagher
- Producers: Noel Gallagher, Dave Sardy

Noel Gallagher's High Flying Birds singles chronology
"AKA... What a Life!" (2011)	"If I Had a Gun..." (2011)	"Dream On" (2012)

"If I Had a Gun..." is a song by the English rock band Noel Gallagher's High Flying Birds, written by frontman Noel Gallagher from their self-titled debut studio album Noel Gallagher's High Flying Birds (2011). It was released as the third single on 26 December 2011 in all regions bar the United Kingdom. As with the band's other single releases, Strangeboy Stacey engineered and mixed the B-side. The song impacted US radio on 13 September 2011.

The track features Jon Graboff on second guitar (credited as the Pedal Steel in the sleeve notes).

== Background ==
Written in Lima, Peru and originally intended to be the lead single off the album, "If I Had a Gun..." was passed over in favour of "The Death of You and Me," as Gallagher thought it sounded too much like his previous band, Oasis. Gallagher described the song as "emotionally uplifting and up there with the best I've wrote".

The song first surfaced on the Internet when Gallagher was recorded playing it at a soundcheck in Taiwan in April 2009 during the Asian leg of Oasis' Dig Out Your Soul world tour.

== Music video ==
Filmed in Los Angeles, California, the music video for "If I Had a Gun..." is centered on a wedding ceremony with Gallagher acting as the priest. During the ceremony a cowboy on a horse arrives and dives into a swimming pool and the bride (Peyton List) follows him and they ride off into the sunset on the horse. Visible at 3:27 are the two women and the "Soulsucker" video camera from the "AKA... What a Life!" music video.

The video appears to be part of a three-video story starting with "If I Had a Gun...", then "The Death of You and Me" and ending with "AKA... What a Life!" as all the videos begin where the other one finished. The videos, however, were not released in chronological order, as the singles came out in a different order.

At the end of the video, Gallagher pulls up in a van outside the same diner he's featured in during "The Death of You and Me." While in the background, as he's walking toward the door, there is a preview of "Shoot a Hole into the Sun," the remixed version of "If I Had a Gun...," from Gallagher's cancelled 2012 collaboration album with Amorphous Androgynous.

The video was directed and produced by Mike Bruce, with producers Blake West and Camille LaBry of United Film House.

== Chart performance and reception ==
As of the chart week ending 21 January 2012, "If I Had a Gun..." had peaked at number 95 in the UK Singles Chart. It was also successful in Japan, peaking at number two on the Japan Hot 100, on the week of 29 October 2011 (and stayed on the chart for many weeks before and after). It ranked at number 77 on the end-of-the-year chart of the Japan Hot 100.

For much of 6 May 2012 and 7 May 2012, "If I Had a Gun..." was the No. 1 trending topic worldwide on Twitter, which originated in Buenos Aires during Gallagher's concert there on the night of 6 May 2012.

== Track listing ==
- CD, 7" JDNCSCD11
1. "If I Had a Gun..." – 4:18
2. "I'd Pick You Every Time" – 2:11
- Digital download JDNCSCD11
1. "If I Had a Gun..." – 4:18
2. "I'd Pick You Every Time" – 2:11
3. "If I Had a Gun..." (music video) – 4:47

== Charts ==
=== Weekly charts ===
Weekly chart performance for "If I Had a Gun..."
Chart (2011–2012)	Peak position
Japan Hot 100 (Billboard)	2
Scottish Singles Sales (Official Charts)	98
UK Indie (Official Charts)	16
UK Singles (Official Charts)	95
US Alternative Airplay (Billboard)	25

== Certifications ==
Region	Certification	Certified units/sales
United Kingdom (BPI)	Platinum	600,000^{‡}
^{‡} Sales+streaming figures based on certification alone.
