= Noel Gallagher's High Flying Birds (album) =

Studio album by Noel Gallagher's High Flying Birds
- Released: 17 October 2011
- Recorded: 2010–2011
- Studios: State of the Ark, Strangeways, Dean St. and Abbey Road, London
- Genre: Alternative rock
- Length: 42:27
- Label: Sour Mash
- Producers: Noel Gallagher; Dave Sardy

Noel Gallagher's High Flying Birds chronology
Noel Gallagher's High Flying Birds (2011)	Songs from the Great White North... (2012)

Singles from Noel Gallagher's High Flying Birds
- 1. "The Death of You and Me" Released: 21 August 2011; 2. "AKA... What a Life!" Released: 9 September 2011; 3. "If I Had a Gun..." Released: 26 December 2011; 4. "Dream On" Released: 12 March 2012; 5. "Everybody's on the Run" Released: 29 July 2012

Noel Gallagher's High Flying Birds is the debut studio album by the English rock band Noel Gallagher's High Flying Birds. Released on 17 October 2011, it is the first studio album released by frontman Noel Gallagher following his 2009 departure from Oasis.

== Background ==
Noel Gallagher's High Flying Birds was recorded between 2010 and 2011 in London and Los Angeles, and produced by Gallagher and former Oasis producer Dave Sardy. Musicians featured on the record include former Oasis keyboardist Mike Rowe, The Lemon Trees drummer Jeremy Stacey and percussionist Lenny Castro, in addition to guest appearances from the Crouch End Festival Chorus and The Wired Strings. The name, High Flying Birds, drew inspiration from the Jefferson Airplane song while using it as a band name was a homage to Peter Green's Fleetwood Mac.

The track listing includes "Stop the Clocks", which is the unreleased Oasis track of that name. On 20 July 2011, "The Death of You and Me" was confirmed as the lead single, scheduled for release on 21 August 2011, with "The Good Rebel" appearing as the B-side. On 30 August 2011, "If I Had a Gun..." premiered on Kroq Radio and will be Gallagher's debut single in North America. The second UK single is "AKA... What a Life!", with "Let the Lord Shine a Light on Me" appearing as the B-side. On 5 September 2011, "AKA... What a Life!" premiered on Gallagher's official YouTube account.

Gallagher also says he has filmed a "BAFTA-worthy video" for a brand new single. He stated (in his web-blog 'Tales From the Middle of Nowhere'): "'I played the part of a slightly hungover grumpy northern taxi driver which is just as well as that's exactly what I felt like. I feel it's some of my best work and most definitely worthy of at least one Bafta. That actress Mischa Barton was in it too. Nice girl. (Manchester) City fan would you believe!?!? (sic)". "Everybody's on the Run" was later confirmed to be the fifth single from the album and was released on 6 August 2012.

== Production ==
Sessions ran from 2010—to begin recording of the album—until 2011, when in July (the 6th) Noel had announced details of the album.

Producer Dave Sardy had said of the album and Noel turned solo musician "It wasn't a weird situation for me. Noel is the main songwriter for Oasis—he always was—and whether anyone wants to admit it, he's kind of the co-manager of the band. He's a very smart guy. [..] I think Noel is a real grown-up in what he does as far as his writing and his music. I mean, I wasn't working with him when he was 18 – I'm sure he's changed, because who hasn't? – but for me, politically, there wasn't anything to think about. Noel is the songwriter, and I'm a song guy. If there was a chance for me to work with anybody in the band, I'd go with the awesome songwriter."

In this interview with MusicRadar.com, Dave also reveals:

"Noel's songs were great. The recordings needed fixing. I think he started out doing demos and then the excitement grew to the point where he thought he was done. It was presented to me like, 'Here's the album, when are you available to mix it?' [..] I flew to the UK and sat down with Noel, and I went through it song by song and what I thought the problems were. By the time we got to the fifth song, he had his head in his hands, and he was like, 'What are you trying to say?' And I said, 'I'm not trying to say. I'm telling you.'; We went through each song measure by measure, and every fifth measure or so I'd say, 'And what about this?' or 'What about that?' It wasn't like I said anything that was a shock to him; I just think he was used to the way everything sounded. At the end, he said, 'Well, how do we change it?' And I said, 'Don't worry, leave it up to me.' He had built a beautiful house, but it was sitting on a tarpit. We had to move it and put it on a better foundation."

Noel had said that when working on the basic demos for the album at the time of the album's beginning stages of production, "Dave said he thought he could make it 10 percent better by re-recording some drums and bass and things. Watching Dave make it sound like a group when it's really just me and a click track was just a fantastic experience. I love Dave Sardy. He's great at what he does. He's great at what I'm not great at. In fact, I don't know exactly what he does, but he's brilliant at it. He really digs my songwriting, and he brings the best out of me because what he does inspires me."

"I'm pleased [with the production of the album], and I'm just glad to play it for the people."

To record the album, Noel and Dave were using a(n) EMI TG console and several Fairchild limiters, in a basic studio set-up.

Various locations for the album production were Surrey's State of the Ark, Manchester's Strangeway Studio, London's Dean St. Studios and the famous Abbey Road Studios.

== Album cover ==
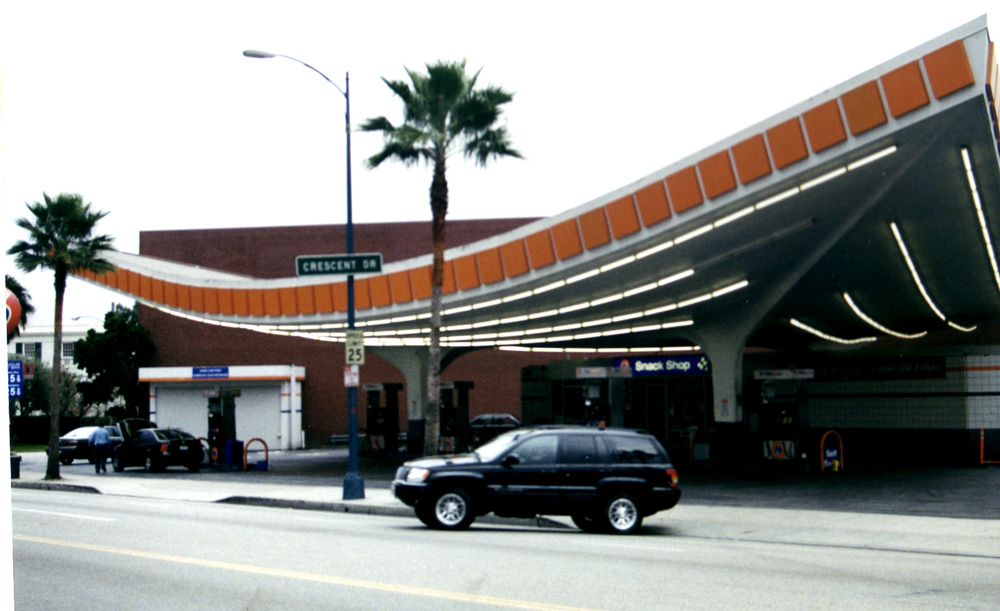
The gas station in Beverly Hills where the photo for the album cover was taken

Lawrence Watson, Noel's personal photographer, was to document Gallagher himself in Los Angeles, California & Beverly Hills starting in Spring 2010, where a number of photos were taken for press release, and for the artwork of the 'High Flying Birds' cover.

When notified that he had to be included in the artwork as a solo artist, Gallagher explained, "There's an old petrol station in Beverly Hills beside the police station that's got a triangular neon roof, and when you stand underneath it, it looks like you're stood underneath Concorde. So we go out one night and it's all lit up in the neon, and we're taking these pictures – it looks like I'm stood under the wings of a high flying bird!"

To show each photo taken of the artwork itself and other numerous photos after being well documented in just 18 months, a Photo Exhibition dedicated to Noel Gallagher's solo career launch was later held by Lawrence Watson in London, UK, going on through 27 October to 13 November 2011.

== Tour ==
Gallagher began the High Flying Birds Tour a week after the release of the album. The first show was in Dublin on 23 October. He said, "We're going to go out on tour a week after the album is out. We're going to start off slow in small theatres. If it's good enough to get bigger than that then it'll get bigger than that. I don't think there'll be a huge great big tour this year. I think this year it'll be a quick whizz around the world and try and do the major cities and then it will probably be a bigger tour next year." North American, European, and Japanese legs were also included. On 9 November 2011 it was announced that Noel Gallagher's High Flying Birds would be headlining all shows at Australia and New Zealand's travelling Big Day Out Festival.

== Reception ==
=== Commercial performance ===
Noel Gallagher's High Flying Birds sold 55,000 copies after two days of sale, more than twice as many copies as its nearest rival, Letters by The X Factor winner Matt Cardle. On 23 October 2011, the album debuted at number one on the UK Albums Chart, with first-week sales of 122,530 copies. In comparison, the debut album by the band of Noel's brother Liam Gallagher, Beady Eye's Different Gear, Still Speeding, sold 66,817 copies when it debuted at number three on the chart in March 2011 and has since sold 166,609 copies in the UK as of January 2012. On 11 November 2011, Noel Gallagher's High Flying Birds was certified platinum by the British Phonographic Industry (BPI) for shipments of 300,000 units in the UK. As of February 2012 the album has sold 600,000 copies in the UK. The album was the fourteenth best-selling album in the UK in 2011. It was also the second biggest-selling rock album of 2011 in the UK, behind Coldplay's Mylo Xyloto. As of 2 January 2013 the album has sold 739,000 copies in the UK. As February 2015 the album has sold 2.5 million copies worldwide.

=== Critical reception ===
Professional ratings
Aggregate scores
Source	Rating
Metacritic	69/100
Review scores
Source	Rating
AllMusic	3/5 stars
BBC	Favourable
The Daily Telegraph	5/5 stars
Digital Spy	4/5 stars
NME	8/10 stars
Paste	8.2/10
Pitchfork	5.7/10
Q	4/5 stars
Rolling Stone	3.5/5 stars

Noel Gallagher's High Flying Birds received positive reviews from music critics. On Metacritic, which assigns a normalised rating out of 100 to reviews from mainstream critics, the album received an average score of 69 based on 33 reviews, indicating "generally favorable reviews". The BBC review praised Gallagher for continuing the proven formula of songwriting he adopted in Oasis, describing the album as an "enjoyable record". Despite giving it a rating of eight out of ten, NME wrote that the album may have benefited from the vocals of former Oasis frontman Liam Gallagher. Digital Spy proposed that "despite all the hints to the contrary, Gallagher has managed to shrug off potentially suffocating expectations to record what could be his best album since (What's the Story) Morning Glory?." Writing for The Daily Telegraph, Neil McCormick awarded the album the highest rating possible, arguing that "High Flying Birds is the best collection of [Noel] Gallagher tunes since his Morning Glory days", referring to the critically acclaimed 1995 Oasis album as a benchmark for the album.

Stephen Thomas Erlewine of AllMusic was more critical: whilst writing that "Gallagher does come up with some keepers," he noted that "the little brass flourishes... don't stop the album from playing like a succession of variations on "Don't Look Back in Anger" and "The Importance of Being Idle"," concluding that Gallagher is "missing anything resembling rock & roll, skimping on quick tempos and loud guitars." Alexis Petridis of The Guardian awarded it three stars out of five. He praised "indelible melodies" that "carry you blithely along, indifferent to the shortcomings of the rest of the song", concluding, "For now, it'll do that it's a more enjoyable album than Oasis' latter-day catalogue. At the risk of handing out some well-worn advice, anyone hoping to hear a radical departure might be recommended to hold on."

Mojo placed the album at number 46 on its list of the "Top 50 Albums of 2011". American Songwriter ranked it number 42 on its list of the "Top 50 Albums of 2011". Q ranked it number 21 on its list of the "Top 50 Albums of 2011". Rolling Stone readers ranked it number 9 on its list of "The Best Albums of 2011".

== Track listing ==
All tracks are written by Noel Gallagher.

Noel Gallagher's High Flying Birds track listing
No.	Title	Length
1.	"Everybody's on the Run"	5:30
2.	"Dream On"	4:29
3.	"If I Had a Gun..."	4:09
4.	"The Death of You and Me"	3:29
5.	"(I Wanna Live in a Dream in My) Record Machine"	4:23
6.	"AKA... What a Life!"	4:24
7.	"Soldier Boys and Jesus Freaks"	3:22
8.	"AKA... Broken Arrow"	3:35
9.	"(Stranded on) The Wrong Beach"	4:02
10.	"Stop the Clocks"	5:04
Total length:		42:27

Bonus tracks

Digital download edition bonus track
No.	Title	Length
11.	"A Simple Game of Genius"	7:19
Total length:		49:46

Japanese edition bonus tracks
No.	Title	Length
11.	"A Simple Game of Genius"	7:19
12.	"The Good Rebel"	4:19
Total length:		53:59

Amazon MP3 deluxe edition bonus track
No.	Title	Length
11.	"Alone on the Rope"	5:04
Total length:		47:31

US deluxe edition bonus tracks
No.	Title	Length
11.	"Let the Lord Shine a Light on Me"	4:12
12.	"The Good Rebel"	4:24
Total length:		51:05

Deluxe edition bonus DVD
No.	Title	Length
1.	"It's Never Too Late to Be What U Might Have Been" (The Making of Noel Gallagher's High Flying Birds)	33:46
2.	"The Death of You and Me" (music video)	4:02
3.	"The Making of "The Death of You and Me""	5:27
Total length:		43:15

Limited Japanese tour edition
No.	Title	Length
1.	"A Simple Game of Genius"	7:18
2.	"The Good Rebel"	4:24
3.	"Let the Lord Shine a Light on Me"	4:14
4.	"Shoot a Hole into the Sun"	7:58
5.	"Live at the NME Awards 2012" (DVD)

== Personnel ==
Noel Gallagher's High Flying Birds

- Noel Gallagher – vocals, guitars, bass, banjo, keyboards (track 9), additional keyboards (tracks 6, 7 and 10) backing vocals (tracks 7 and 9), production
- Dave Sardy – production, mixing, drum programming (tracks 6 and 9)
- Mike Rowe – keyboards (all except track 9)
- Jeremy Stacey – drums
- Ian Cooper – mastering

Additional musicians

- Beccy Byrne – backing vocals (tracks 2, 3, 5, 8 and 10)
- Mark Neary – double bass (track 4), musical saw (tracks 4 and 8), wine glasses (track 9)
- Gary Alesbrook – trumpet (tracks 2, 4, 7 and 10)
- Trevor Mires – trombone (tracks 2, 4, 7 and 10)
- Andrew Kinsman – saxophone (tracks 2, 4, 7 and 10)
- Jon Graboff – pedal steel guitar (track 3)
- Luís Jardim – percussion (tracks 4, 8 and 10)
- Lenny Castro – percussion (track 8)
- Paul Stacey – guitar solo (track 10), bass (track 11), engineering (track 11), mixing (track 11)
- The Wired Strings – strings (tracks 1 and 5)
- Rosie Danvers – string arrangements
- Crouch End Festival Chorus – choir vocals (tracks 1, 5 and 10)
- Steve Markwick – choral arrangements
- Cherrelle Rose – backing vocals (track 11)
- Joy Rose-Thomas – backing vocals (track 11)

- Credits adapted from album liner notes.

== Charts ==
=== Weekly charts ===
Weekly chart performance for Noel Gallagher's High Flying Birds
Chart (2011)	Peak position
Australian Albums (ARIA)	16
Austrian Albums (Ö3 Austria)	16
Belgian Albums (Ultratop Flanders)	10
Belgian Albums (Ultratop Wallonia)	16
Canadian Albums (Billboard)	19
Croatian Albums Chart	10
Danish Albums (Hitlisten)	27
Dutch Albums (Album Top 100)	11
Finnish Albums (Suomen virallinen lista)	29
French Albums (SNEP)	9
German Albums (Offizielle Top 100)	11
Irish Albums (IRMA)	1
Italian Albums (FIMI)	2
Japanese Albums (Oricon)	5
Mexican Albums (Top 100 Mexico)	53
New Zealand Albums (RMNZ)	10
Norwegian Albums (VG-lista)	12
Scottish Albums (Official Charts)	1
South Korean Albums Chart	33
Spanish Albums (Promusicae)	15
Swedish Albums (Sverigetopplistan)	21
Swiss Albums (Schweizer Hitparade)	10
UK Albums (Official Charts)	1
UK Independent Albums (Official Charts)	1
US Billboard 200	28
US Top Rock Albums (Billboard)	5
US Indie Store Album Sales (Billboard)	3

=== Year-end charts ===
2011 year-end chart performance for Noel Gallagher's High Flying Birds
Chart (2011)	Position
UK Albums (OCC)	14

2012 year-end chart performance for Noel Gallagher's High Flying Birds
Chart (2012)	Position
UK Albums (OCC)	33

=== Decade-end charts ===
Decade-end chart performance for Noel Gallagher's High Flying Birds
Chart (2010–2019)	Peak position
UK Albums (OCC)	69

== Certifications ==
Certifications for Noel Gallagher's High Flying Birds
Region	Certification	Certified units/sales
United Kingdom (BPI)	3× Platinum	900,000^{‡}
^{‡} Sales+streaming figures based on certification alone.

== Release history ==
- The album was distributed by EMI Music in Europe and other places near the area while Universal Music distributed in North America.

Release history and formats for Noel Gallagher's High Flying Birds
Region	Date	Format	Label
Japan	12 October 2011	CD, LP, digital download	Sony Music Japan
Australia	14 October 2011	CD, LP, digital download	Sour Mash Records
Ireland	14 October 2011	CD, LP, digital download	Sour Mash Records
New Zealand	14 October 2011	CD, LP, digital download	Sour Mash Records
United Kingdom	16 October 2011	Digital download	Sour Mash Records
United Kingdom	17 October 2011	CD, LP	Sour Mash Records
Canada	8 November 2011	CD, LP, digital download	Sour Mash Records
United States	8 November 2011	CD, LP, digital download	Sour Mash Records
