= Stop the Clocks (song) =

2008 Oasis song later performed by Noel Gallagher's High Flying Birds

Song by Noel Gallagher's High Flying Birds

from the album Noel Gallagher's High Flying Birds
- Released: 17 October 2011
- Genre: Rock
- Length: 5:04
- Label: Sour Mash
- Songwriter: Noel Gallagher
- Producers: Noel Gallagher, Dave Sardy

"Stop the Clocks" is a song by English rock band Noel Gallagher's High Flying Birds. Written by guitarist and vocalist Noel Gallagher in 2001, the song was originally recorded for the Oasis album Don't Believe the Truth in 2004, but was removed from the final track listing. When the band released a compilation of the same name, it was rumoured that the song would appear as a bonus track on the album, but as of 2009 (and the disbandment of Oasis) the song remained unreleased. A studio performance of the song, believed to be dating from the Don't Believe the Truth recording sessions, as well as a live version performed in May 2003, were leaked onto the internet on 6 May 2008 by an Oasis fansite. On 6 July 2011, it was announced that "Stop the Clocks" would finally be released on Noel Gallagher's debut solo album, Noel Gallagher's High Flying Birds.

The song is similar to a song by The La's, "Looking Glass", which both Gallaghers have praised numerous times.

== History ==
=== Background and composition (2001–2002) ===
In a November 2006 interview for an Italian broadcast, Noel said that he wrote the song in 2001 while in Thailand. It was written whilst Liam Gallagher was recording vocals for "Stop Crying Your Heart Out", during recording sessions for Heathen Chemistry, sometime in 2001, and was first mentioned in interviews by Noel in the Autumn of 2002. Noel told Tokyo's J-Wave radio station that it's about, "A dream I had one night. It's wondering about if you were dead, how would you know you were actually dead, how would you know you were actually alive. When you go to bed and you dream dreams... if you never woke up, how would you know? Maybe we're all just dreaming now." In March 2003, he told Austrian TV show 'Arena' that, "it doesn't sound like anything we've done before or anything I've ever written... in its lyrical content it's quite near to The Masterplan".

More details about the song were revealed by Gallagher at the Glastonbury Festival in June 2004, with Noel telling a backstage programme on BBC Three that the track was seven minutes long and would probably never be performed live because it was, "just me and an acoustic guitar and lots of backwards stuff and it's something to be listened to when one is very high". It's not known whether Noel was referring to his original demo or if he was referring to a version which had been recorded in early Don't Believe the Truth recording sessions before Glastonbury.

=== Debut live performance (2003) ===
On 3 May 2003, Noel played the song in public for the first time at the Zanzibar club in Liverpool. Noel, fellow Oasis guitarist Gem Archer and part-time Oasis percussionist Terry Kirkbride played a five-song semi-acoustic set as a favour to The Bandits, who were headlining at the time. A review passed on to NME said that the song was as a cross between "The Hindu Times" and "Wonderwall", similar to late George Harrison-penned Beatles. It features the lyric 'Stop the clocks and leave it all behind / On the backseat of my mind'. Another review, published at AngryApe, said that the song left the crowd "divided and unsure", adding that it was "a fairly melancholic affair crossing "Fade In-Out" with "Who Feels Love?". It's classic Oasis but with more soul, fairly mature and well structured as opposed to 3 chord catchy pop songs."

=== Recording for Don't Believe the Truth (2004–2005) ===
The song was widely expected to be included on Oasis' 2005 album, Don't Believe the Truth, when it came out in May of that year. However, Noel revealed in a short interview to Q in March 2005 that the song, which was tentatively slotted in at track 7, in between "The Meaning of Soul" and "Part of the Queue", might not be included on the album, adding that there was a debate taking place at that moment. The absence of the track was soon confirmed, when Oasis' official web site released the final track listing for the album, with "Stop the Clocks" nowhere to be seen.

During promotional interviews for Don't Believe the Truth, Noel was asked about the song a few times, but he never said anything about the track other than what he talked about in an Oasisinet.com webcast on 22 April 2005. In a two-hour chat with fans, hosted by Gary Crowley, Noel was asked about the song and why it wasn't on the record. He replied: "The whole album was kind of based around that song. It was kind of a long "Champagne Supernova"-type thing and it's got fantastic lyrics and a great vibe, but I felt that we never really got the correct version. We've got 6 or 7 versions of it and not one of them really sat in the pocket for me. But it's there and it will now be on the back burner. Originally the album was going to be called Stop the Clocks, which would have been a great title but, because these songs were so new, that song began to feel very old because it was written in 2001. But it will come out eventually."

Noel later revealed that part of Oasis' next studio album could include songs which were written for Don't Believe the Truth and are, in his opinion, equal to anything on that album, but weren't included on it as they didn't quite fit the feel of the record. However, when the album Dig Out Your Soul was released, the song once again was not included.

=== Internet leaks (2008) ===
On 6 May 2008, an early studio performance of the song was uploaded to various Oasis forums. Also included were various alternative versions of a number of Don't Believe the Truth songs as well as two other unreleased songs. The exact date of the performance is unclear, although it's likely to be from a Don't Believe the Truth recording session, sometime in 2004. A recording of the May 2003 performance was also uploaded to Oasis forums the same day.

=== Noel Gallagher's High Flying Birds (2011) ===
On 6 July 2011, Noel Gallagher announced full details of his new solo debut album 'High Flying Birds' at a London press conference, with the track "Stop the Clocks" as the last song on the album.

However, it is the only song from the album not to be played on High Flying Birds Tour.
