= Dream On (Noel Gallagher's High Flying Birds song) =

Single by Noel Gallagher's High Flying Birds

from the album Noel Gallagher's High Flying Birds
- B-side: "Shoot a Hole into the Sun"
- Released: 11 March 2012
- Genre: Rock
- Length: 4:29
- Label: Sour Mash Records
- Songwriter(s): Noel Gallagher
- Producer(s): Noel Gallagher, Dave Sardy

Noel Gallagher's High Flying Birds singles chronology
"If I Had a Gun..." (2011)	"Dream On" (2012)	"Everybody's on the Run" (2012)

"Dream On" is a song by the English rock band Noel Gallagher's High Flying Birds, written by frontman Noel Gallagher from his self-titled debut album Noel Gallagher's High Flying Birds. The single was released on 11 March 2012. The B-side – "Shoot a Hole into the Sun" – is a remix of "If I Had a Gun..." from Noel Gallagher's cancelled collaboration with the Amorphous Androgynous, and as with the other B-sides from the album's singles, it was mixed by Paul "Strangeboy" Stacey.

== Music video ==
Starring Zoë Bell, Troy Mittleider and Omar Doom. Directed and produced by Mike Bruce, with producers Blake West and Camille LaBry of United Film House. Production design by Christian Zollenkopf.

The video sees Gallagher acting as the referee of a boxing match.

== Track listing ==
- CD, 12" JDNCSCD13
1. "Dream On" – 4:29
2. "Shoot a Hole into the Sun" – 7:58
- Digital download JDNCSCD13
1. "Dream On" – 4:29
2. "Shoot a Hole into the Sun" (Noel Gallagher/Garry Cobain/Brian Dougans) – 7:58
3. "Dream On" (music video) – 4:26

"Shoot a Hole into the Sun" was produced by Amorphous Androgynous and mixed by Paul "Strangeboy" Stacey.

== Charts ==
Chart (2012)	Peak position
Belgium (Ultratip Bubbling Under Wallonia)	44
Scotland (OCC)	39
UK Indie (OCC)	3
UK Singles (OCC)	52
