= Everybody's on the Run =

Single by Noel Gallagher's High Flying Birds

from the album Noel Gallagher's High Flying Birds
- B-side: "AKA... What a Life!" (The Amorphous Androgynous Remix)
- Released: 29 July 2012
- Genre: Rock
- Length: 5:30
- Label: Sour Mash
- Songwriter: Noel Gallagher
- Producers: Noel Gallagher, Dave Sardy

Noel Gallagher's High Flying Birds singles chronology
"Dream On" (2012)	"Everybody's on the Run" (2012)	"In the Heat of the Moment" (2014)

"Everybody's on the Run" is a song by the English rock band Noel Gallagher's High Flying Birds, written by frontman Noel Gallagher from their self-titled debut album Noel Gallagher's High Flying Birds (2011). The song was released on 29 July 2012 as the fifth and final single from the album. The song was used for BT advertisements. "Everybody's on the Run" peaked at number 61 on the UK Singles Chart.

== Track listing ==
All tracks are written by Noel Gallagher.

CD, 12", download JDNCSCD15
No.	Title	Length
1.	"Everybody's on the Run"	5:30
2.	"AKA... What a Life!" (The Amorphous Androgynous Remix)	15:06

== Music video ==
Gallagher described the video (in his web-blog 'Tales From the Middle of Nowhere')

I played the part of a slightly hungover grumpy northern taxi driver which is just as well as that's exactly what I felt like. I feel it's some of my best work and most definitely worthy of at least one Bafta. That actress Mischa Barton was in it too. Nice girl. [Manchester] City fan would you believe!?!?

The music video starts out with a slow turn-about of a man, idling in his own time at his apartment, and Mischa Barton as a girl in a taxi, who then gets out of the taxi, only to have her dress get caught on the taxi door, and torn off from her. At the same time the man (Cameron Van Hoy) in a similar situation, has his delivered shoes stolen by a free-roaming skateboarder straight from his hands that was being mailed to him (shown in the beginning of the video). The man chases after the skateboarder to get his shoes back while the girl on the other hand is running for her dress and chasing the grumpy taxi driver who is portrayed by Noel himself. The skateboarder continues down a road, to suddenly run into the taxi driver and come to a full stop with the skateboarder holding up his right knee because it is where he is hurt. Then, Mischa Barton's character and the man run into each other, to find that they have the same clothing underneath showing to each own; both intrigued, all else ends in the man's apartment where he and the girl are making love in the same shoes.

Starring Mischa Barton; directed and produced by Mike Bruce.

The music video reunites Mischa Barton and Cameron Van Hoy who played a couple of adolescent bank robbers in the 1999 indie crime crama, Pups. Roger Ebert praised their work at the time as "two of the most natural and freed performances I have seen by actors of any age."

== Charts ==
=== Weekly charts ===
Chart (2012)	Peak position
Scotland Singles (OCC)	49
UK Singles (OCC)	61
