= The Death of You and Me =

Single by Noel Gallagher's High Flying Birds

from the album Noel Gallagher's High Flying Birds
- B-side: "The Good Rebel"
- Released: 21 August 2011
- Genre: Rock, baroque pop
- Length: 3:36
- Label: Sour Mash
- Songwriter: Noel Gallagher
- Producers: Noel Gallagher, Dave Sardy

Noel Gallagher's High Flying Birds singles chronology
"The Death of You and Me" (2011)	"AKA... What a Life!" (2011)

"The Death of You and Me" is the debut single by the English rock band Noel Gallagher's High Flying Birds. The song was written by Noel Gallagher as his first solo effort, and produced by Gallagher and Dave Sardy. It was released on 21 August 2011 by Sour Mash Records as the debut single and lead single from the band's eponymous debut album (2011). On 28 August 2011, the song debuted at number fifteen on the UK Singles Chart.

== Background ==
Rumours that "The Death of You and Me" was the name of Gallagher's first solo single began to surface in June 2011. It was confirmed the following month that the song was to be released as the musician's first solo single on 21 August 2011, through Gallagher's own label Sour Mash Records with B-side "The Good Rebel". When asked at a press conference whether the meaning of the song was related to the relationship between himself and former bandmate and brother Liam, Gallagher replied that it was based on the saying "If we don't leave this place, it'll be the death of you and me", and that it was "a bit more romantic than that [his relationship with his brother]" and is "a romantic song about ... people escaping the surroundings they're in ... and having a jolly good time and living happily ever after".

== Music video ==
Filmed in Los Angeles, California, the music video for "The Death of You and Me" starts at a café and a waitress serving customers including Gallagher before taking a break. She then goes outside and prepares to dive backwards into a swimming pool but is pushed in by Gallagher. She then gets out of the pool and walks through the café and out the front to see a band and a horse-drawn wagon, which appeared throughout the video, stopping outside the café. The wagon's door then opens and the waitress goes inside before the door slams shut. The video ends with the words To Be Continued (The 'story' then continues in the 2nd single from the album, AKA... What a Life!. The video was made available to viewers in the United Kingdom on 25 July 2011. It also shows that Noel Gallagher is left-handed despite playing the guitar right-handed.

The waitress is played by actress Devon Ogden. Directed and produced by Mike Bruce, with producers Blake West and Camille LaBry of United Film House.

== Track listing ==
All tracks are written by Noel Gallagher.

CD single, 7" vinyl
No.	Title	Length
1.	"The Death of You and Me"	3:36
2.	"The Good Rebel"	4:20

Digital download
No.	Title	Length
3.	"The Death of You and Me" (music video)	4:01

== Charts ==
=== Weekly charts ===
Weekly chart performance for "The Death of You and Me"
Chart (2011)	Peak position
Belgium (Ultratip Bubbling Under Flanders)	15
Belgium (Ultratip Bubbling Under Wallonia)	24
Czech Republic Modern Rock (IFPI)	7
Ireland (IRMA)	35
Mexico Airplay (Billboard)	21
Scotland Singles (OCC)	10
UK Singles (OCC)	15
UK Indie (OCC)	2

== Certifications ==
Region	Certification	Certified units/sales
United Kingdom (BPI)	Silver	200,000^{‡}
^{‡} Sales+streaming figures based on certification alone.
