= AKA... What a Life! =

Single by Noel Gallagher's High Flying Birds

from the album Noel Gallagher's High Flying Birds
- B-side: "Let the Lord Shine a Light on Me"
- Released: 9 September 2011
- Recorded: 2010
- Genre: Alternative rock
- Length: 4:24
- Label: Sour Mash
- Songwriter: Noel Gallagher
- Producer: Dave Sardy

Noel Gallagher's High Flying Birds singles chronology
"The Death of You and Me" (2011)	"AKA... What a Life!" (2011)	"If I Had a Gun..." (2011)

"AKA... What a Life!" is a song by the English rock band Noel Gallagher's High Flying Birds. The song was written by Noel Gallagher and was released through Gallagher's own label, Sour Mash Records and produced by Dave Sardy whom Noel had previously worked with on Oasis records.

It was released on 9 September 2011 as the second single from the band's eponymous studio album, Noel Gallagher's High Flying Birds (2011). Following the success of "The Death of You and Me", "AKA... What a Life!" was released as a digital UK single on 9 September 2011, alongside "If I Had a Gun...", which was released as a North American (digital) single on 31 August 2011. It was later physically released as a CD single, 7" vinyl on 17 October 2011. It reached number twenty on the UK Singles Chart.

== Background ==
On 1 September 2011, a 90-second preview of "...What a Life!" was released through a sponsorship commercial by Vauxhall on YouTube, which supposedly gave attention to the commercial.

"AKA...What a Life!" is only available for digital download in the United Kingdom and Ireland.

Originally the single was to be called "Ride the Tiger" but this was changed after a couple of months, due to Noel feeling uncomfortable with the title.

== Vauxhall advertisement ==
On 1 September 2011, Vauxhall Motors released a new advertisement to advertise their three-and-a-half-year deal sponsorship of the England national football team. Vauxhall had also previewed a minute and a half of Noel Gallagher's unreleased track single, "AKA... What a Life!" The commercial included Frank Lampard, Wayne Rooney, Jack Wilshere, Ashley Cole, Joe Hart, Darren Bent, James Milner, and Scott Parker alongside football fans of the team and the Vauxhall staff at Wembley Stadium. Vauxhall hoped that the campaign would capture "how football brings people together" and highlighted the car brand's support of the women's, youth, and disability teams as well as the men's team. The campaign was developed by McCann Erickson Birmingham.

== In popular culture ==
“AKA... What a Life!" was featured in the video game F1 2012.

== Music video ==
A 36-second teaser was uploaded on the Oasis website on 3 October 2011.

On 6 October 2011 the full 8-minute video for "AKA... What a Life!" was released on the Noelgallaghervevo page.

The video takes place straight after the events of "The Death of You and Me" where The Waitress, after entering the wagon, is greeted by a man known as The Dark (played by Russell Brand, who is a real-life friend of Gallagher) wearing a top hat sitting on a throne flanked with two flaming torches. He says that he can see that she, like most people who have crossed the threshold, has many questions. He then summons his two nieces to restrain the Waitress so he can force feed her a potion. However a vision of Noel appears to teleport the Waitress away to safety.

The Dark then sends his nieces to find the Waitress. The nieces carjack two cowboys and recapture the Waitress and put her in the boot of the car after finding her wandering a desert. The nieces then pick up Noel, who is hitchhiking. Noel then proceeds to film the journey. The trio then stop off at an abandoned swimming pool where it is revealed that the camera Noel is using is a Soulsucker, which makes the nieces fade. Noel then puts the camera in a locked box and puts it in the boot of the car after freeing the Waitress.

The video ends with Noel and the Waitress driving away.

The video is notable for including snippets of a reworked version of "The Death of You and Me", causing speculation that it has been taken from Noel's second solo album with the Amorphous Androgynous.

This video also appears to finish an apparent 3 video story, starting with "If I Had a Gun" and "The Death of You and Me", in which we see Noel first as a priest at a wedding, then in the bar "Last Chance" where he pushes The Waitress into a pool of water, in which case is presumed she is being baptised and, as she lands, she looks somewhat like an angel. We see Noel finish the story in a Ford Mustang with the two females mentioned earlier, along with a device that at first looks like an 8mm film camera, but we later see is called the "SoulSucker". He uses this device to remove the 2 females from the video near the end, who have locked The Waitress in the back of the Ford Mustang. Noel frees her from the car and places the "SoulSucker", inside a locked wooden case, into the back of the car. Directed by Mike Bruce and Blake West; with producer Camille LaBry West of United Film House.

== Track listing ==
- CD, 7" JDNCSCD12
1. "AKA... What a Life!" – 4:27
2. "Let the Lord Shine a Light on Me" – 4:15
- Digital download JDNCSCD12
1. "AKA... What a Life!" – 4:24
2. "Let the Lord Shine a Light on Me" – 4:15
3. "AKA... What a Life!" (music video)

== Charts ==
=== Weekly charts ===
Weekly chart performance for "AKA... What a Life!"
Chart (2011)	Peak position
Belgium (Ultratip Bubbling Under Flanders)	20
Belgium (Ultratip Bubbling Under Wallonia)	33
Japan Hot 100 (Billboard)	49
Mexico Airplay (Billboard)	22
Scotland Singles (Official Charts)	15
UK Singles (Official Charts)	20
UK Indie (Official Charts)	2

=== Year-end charts ===
Year-end chart performance for "AKA... What a Life!"
Chart (2011)	Peak position
UK Singles (OCC)	172

== Certifications ==
Region	Certification	Certified units/sales
United Kingdom (BPI)	Platinum	600,000^{‡}
^{‡} Sales+streaming figures based on certification alone.
