= List of Official Record Store Chart number ones from the 2010s =

The Official Record Store Chart is a weekly music chart based on physical sales of albums in almost 100 independent record stores in the United Kingdom, such as Rough Trade, Rounder Records, Jumbo and Sound It Out. It is compiled by the Official Charts Company (OCC), and each week's number one is first announced on Friday evenings on the OCC's official website.

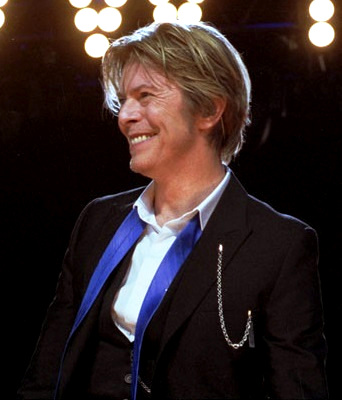
David Bowie holds the record for the most number-one albums during the decade

== Number ones ==
Key
No.	nth album to top the Official Record Store Chart
re	Return of an album to number one
†	Best-selling album of the year in record stores

No.	Artist (Note: The artist, album, date of reaching number one and number of weeks at number one are those given by the OCC.)	Album	Record label (Note: The record labels are those given by the OCC.)	Reached number one	Weeks at number one
2012
1	Alabama Shakes	Boys & Girls	Rough Trade	20 April 2012	1
2	Spiritualized	Sweet Heart Sweet Light	Double Six	22 April 2012	1
3	Jack White	Blunderbuss	XL Recordings	29 April 2012	1
4	Mystery Jets	Radlands	Rough Trade	6 May 2012	1
5	The Cribs	In the Belly of the Brazen Bull	Wichita	13 May 2012	1
6	Richard Hawley	Standing at the Sky's Edge	Parlophone	20 May 2012	1
7	Saint Etienne	Words and Music by Saint Etienne	UMC	27 May 2012	1
8	Sigur Rós	Valtari	Parlophone	3 June 2012	1
9	Gary Barlow & The Commonwealth Band	Sing	Decca	10 June 2012	1
10	Hot Chip	In Our Heads	Domino Recordings	17 June 2012	1
11	Can	The Lost Tapes	Spoon	24 June 2012	1
12	Linkin Park	Living Things	Warner Bros	1 July 2012	1
13	The King Blues	Long Live the Struggle	Transmission	8 July 2012	1
14	Newton Faulkner	Write It on Your Skin	Ugly Truth	15 July 2012	2
15	The Gaslight Anthem	Handwritten	Mercury	29 July 2012	1
16	Conor Maynard	Contrast	Parlophone	5 August 2012	1
re	The Gaslight Anthem	Handwritten	Mercury	12 August 2012	1
17	Spector	Enjoy It While It Lasts	Fiction	19 August 2012	1
18	Jessie Ware	Devotion	Island/PMR	26 August 2012	1
19	Swans	The Seer	Young God	2 September 2012	1
20	The Vaccines	Come of Age	Columbia	9 September 2012	1
21	The xx	Coexist	Young Turks	16 September 2012	2
22	Mumford & Sons	Babel †	Gentlemen of the Road/Island	30 September 2012	1
23	Muse	The 2nd Law	Helium 3/Warner	7 October 2012	1
24	All Time Low	Don't Panic	Hopeless	14 October 2012	1
25	Godspeed You! Black Emperor	'Allelujah! Don't Bend! Ascend!	Constellation	21 October 2012	1
re	Mumford & Sons	Babel †	Gentlemen of the Road/Island	28 October 2012	1
26	Neil Young & Crazy Horse	Psychedelic Pill	Warner Bros	4 November 2012	1
27	André Rieu & the Johann Strauss Orchestra	Magic of the Movies	Decca	11 November 2012	1
28	One Direction	Take Me Home	Syco	18 November 2012	1
29	Led Zeppelin	Celebration Day	Atlantic/Rhino/Swan Song	25 November 2012	2
30	Olly Murs	Right Place Right Time	Epic	9 December 2012	1
31	Emeli Sandé	Our Version of Events	Virgin	16 December 2012	2
re	Mumford & Sons	Babel †	Gentlemen of the Road/Island	30 December 2012	1
2013
re	Neil Young & Crazy Horse	Psychedelic Pill	Warner Bros	6 January 2013	2
32	Dutch Uncles	Out of Touch in the Wild	Memphis Industries	20 January 2013	1
33	I Am Kloot	Let It All In	Shepherd Moon	27 January 2013	1
34	Biffy Clyro	Opposites	14th Floor	3 February 2013	1
35	Frightened Rabbit	Pedestrian Verse	Atlantic	10 February 2013	1
36	Foals	Holy Fire	Warner Bros	17 February 2013	1
37	Nick Cave and the Bad Seeds	Push the Sky Away	Bad Seed	24 February 2013	1
38	Palma Violets	180	Rough Trade	3 March 2013	1
39	Bastille	Bad Blood	Virgin	10 March 2013	1
40	David Bowie	The Next Day	RCA	17 March 2013	2
41	Peace	In Love	Columbia	31 March 2013	1
42	Bring Me the Horizon	Sempiternal	RCA	7 April 2013	1
43	Scholars	Always Lead, Never Follow	Banquet	14 April 2013	1
44	Yeah Yeah Yeahs	Mosquito	Polydor	21 April 2013	1
45	Frank Turner	Tape Deck Heart	Xtra Mile	28 April 2013	1
46	Seasick Steve	Hubcap Music	Fiction	5 May 2013	1
47	Savages	Silence Yourself	Matador	12 May 2013	1
48	Vampire Weekend	Modern Vampires of the City	XL Recordings	19 May 2013	1
49	Daft Punk	Random Access Memories	Columbia	26 May 2013	2
50	Queens of the Stone Age	...Like Clockwork	Matador	9 June 2013	1
51	Beady Eye	BE	Columbia	16 June 2013	1
52	Sigur Rós	Kveikur	XL Recordings	23 June 2013	1
53	Tom Odell	Long Way Down	Columbia	30 June 2013	1
54	Waxahatchee	Cerulean Salt	Wichita	7 July 2013	1
re	Daft Punk	Random Access Memories	Columbia	14 July 2013	1
55	Pet Shop Boys	Electric	x2	21 July 2013	1
56	Fuck Buttons	Slow Focus	ATP	28 July 2013	1
57	AlunaGeorge	Body Music	Island	4 August 2013	1
58	Swim Deep	Where the Heaven Are We	RCA	11 August 2013	1
59	White Lies	Big TV	Fiction	18 August 2013	1
60	King Krule	6 Feet Beneath the Moon	XL Recordings	25 August 2013	1
61	Franz Ferdinand	Right Thoughts, Right Words, Right Action	Domino Recordings	1 September 2013	1
62	The 1975	The 1975	Dirty Hit/Polydor	8 September 2013	1
63	Arctic Monkeys	AM †	Domino Recordings	15 September 2013	3
64	Haim	Days Are Gone	Polydor	6 October 2013	1
65	dan le sac vs Scroobius Pip	Repent Replenish Repeat	Sunday Best	13 October 2013	1
66	Pearl Jam	Lightning Bolt	EMI	20 October 2013	1
re	Arctic Monkeys	AM †	Domino Recordings	27 October 2013	1
67	Arcade Fire	Reflektor	Sonovox	3 November 2013	1
68	Eminem	The Marshall Mathers LP 2	Interscope	10 November 2013	1
69	The Beatles	On Air – Live at the BBC Volume 2	Apple	17 November 2013	1
70	Jake Bugg	Shangri	Interscope	24 November 2013	1
71	One Direction	Midnight Memories	Syco Music	1 December 2013	1
72	Gary Barlow	Since I Saw You Last	Polydor	8 December 2013	1
73	Robbie Williams	Swings Both Ways	Island	15 December 2013	3
2014
re	Arctic Monkeys	AM	Domino Recordings	5 January 2014	1
74	Stephen Malkmus	Wig Out at Jagbags	Domino Recordings	12 January 2014	1
75	Bruce Springsteen	High Hopes	Columbia	19 January 2014	1
76	Mogwai	Rave Tapes	Columbia	26 January 2014	1
77	You Me at Six	Cavalier Youth	BMG Rights	2 February 2014	1
78	Bombay Bicycle Club	So Long, See You Tomorrow	Island	9 February 2014	1
79	Temples	Sun Structures	Heavenly	16 February 2014	1
80	Nina Nesbitt	Peroxide	Island	23 February 2014	1
81	Wild Beasts	Present Tense	Domino Recordings	2 March 2014	1
82	Blood Red Shoes	Blood Red Shoes	Jazz Life	9 March 2014	1
83	Metronomy	Love Letters	Because	16 March 2014	1
84	The War on Drugs	Lost in the Dream	Secretly Canadian	23 March 2014	1
85	Wilko Johnson/Roger Daltrey	Going Back Home	Chess	30 March 2014	3
86	Paolo Nutini	Caustic Love	Atlantic	20 April 2014	2
87	Damon Albarn	Everyday Robots	Parlophone	4 May 2014	1
88	The Horrors	Luminous	XL Recordings	11 May 2014	1
89	Little Dragon	Nabuma Rubberband	Because	18 May 2014	1
90	Coldplay	Ghost Stories	Parlophone	25 May 2014	2
91	Led Zeppelin	Led Zeppelin	Rhino	8 June 2014	1
92	Jack White	Lazaretto	XL Recordings	15 June 2014	1
93	Klaxons	Love Frequency	Akashic	22 June 2014	1
94	Ed Sheeran	X †	Asylum	29 June 2014	1
95	George Ezra	Wanted on Voyage	Columbia	6 July 2014	1
96	Manic Street Preachers	Futurology	Columbia	13 July 2014	1
97	Jungle	Jungle	XL Recordings	20 July 2014	1
98	King Creosote	From Scotland with Love	Domino Recordings	27 July 2014	1
99	Eric Clapton	Eric Clapton & Friends – The Breeze	Polydor	3 August 2014	1
100	Charlie Simpson	Long Road Home	Nusic Sounds	10 August 2014	1
101	Childhood	Lacuna	House Anxiety	17 August 2014	1
102	Twin Atlantic	Great Divide	Red Bull	24 August 2014	1
103	Royal Blood	Royal Blood	Warner Bros	31 August 2014	2
104	M.A.D	MAD	Geoma	14 September 2014	1
105	Catfish & The Bottlemen	The Balcony	Island	21 September 2014	1
106	Aphex Twin	Syro	Warp	28 September 2014	1
107	Jamie T	Carry on the Grudge	Virgin	5 October 2014	1
108	Caribou	Our Love	City Slang	12 October 2014	2
109	Slipknot	.5: The Gray Chapter	Roadrunner	26 October 2014	1
110	Mallory Knox	Asymmetry	Search And Destroy/Sony	2 November 2014	1
111	Bob Dylan & The Band	The Bootleg Series Vol. 11: The Basement Tapes Complete	Columbia	9 November 2014	1
112	Pink Floyd	The Endless River	Rhino	16 November 2014	2
113	Frank Turner	The Third Three Years	Xtra Mile	30 November 2014	1
114	AC/DC	Rock or Bust	Columbia	7 December 2014	1
re	Ed Sheeran	X †	Asylum	14 December 2014	3
2015
115	Sam Smith	In the Lonely Hour	Capitol	4 January 2015	2
116	Panda Bear	Panda Bear Meets the Grim Reaper	Domino Recordings	18 January 2015	1
117	Belle and Sebastian	Girls in Peacetime Want to Dance	Matador	25 January 2015	1
118	The Charlatans	Modern Nature	BMG Rights	1 February 2015	1
119	Bob Dylan	Shadows in the Night	Columbia	8 February 2015	1
120	Peace	Happy People	Columbia	15 February 2015	1
121	Father John Misty	I Love You, Honeybear	Bella Union	22 February 2015	1
122	Public Service Broadcasting	The Race for Space	Test Card Recordings	1 March 2015	1
123	Noel Gallagher's High Flying Birds	Chasing Yesterday	Sour Mash	8 March 2015	2
124	Björk	Vulnicura	One Little Indian	22 March 2015	1
125	The Cribs	For All My Sisters	Sonic Blew	29 March 2015	1
126	Sufjan Stevens	Carrie & Lowell	Asthmatic Kitty	5 April 2015	1
127	All Time Low	Future Hearts	Hopeless	12 April 2015	1
128	Manic Street Preachers	The Holy Bible 20	Sony Music CG	19 April 2015	1
129	Alabama Shakes	Sound & Color	Rough Trade	26 April 2015	1
130	Blur	The Magic Whip	Parlophone	3 May 2015	1
131	Django Django	Born Under Saturn	Because Music	10 May 2015	1
132	Mumford & Sons	Wilder Mind	Gentlemen of the Road/Island	17 May 2015	1
133	Hot Chip	Why Make Sense?	Domino Recordings	24 May 2015	1
134	The Vaccines	English Graffiti	Columbia	31 May 2015	1
135	Jamie xx	In Colour	Young Turks Recordings	7 June 2015	1
136	Muse	Drones	Helium 3/Warner Bros	14 June 2015	2
137	Wolf Alice	My Love Is Cool	Dirty Hit	28 June 2015	2
138	Lucy Rose Parton	Work It Out	Columbia	10 July 2015	1
139	Four Tet	Morning/Evening	Text	17 July 2015	1
140	Tame Impala	Currents	Fiction	24 July 2015	1
141	Sleaford Mods	Key Markets	Harbinger Sound	31 July 2015	1
142	The Maccabees	Marks to Prove It	Fiction	7 August 2015	1
143	Frank Turner	Positive Songs for Negative People	Polydor	14 August 2015	1
144	Frank Carter & The Rattlesnakes	Blossom	International Death Cult	21 August 2015	1
145	Spector	Moth Boys	Fiction	28 August 2015	1
146	Foals	What Went Down	Warner Bros	4 September 2015	1
147	Iron Maiden	The Book of Souls	Parlophone	11 September 2015	1
148	Bring Me the Horizon	That's the Spirit	RCA	18 September 2015	1
149	David Gilmour	Rattle That Lock	Columbia	25 September 2015	1
150	New Order	Music Complete	Mute	2 October 2015	2
151	John Grant	Grey Tickles, Black Pressure	Bella Union	16 October 2015	2
152	Joanna Newsom	Divers	Drag City	30 October 2015	1
153	Elvis Presley with the Royal Philharmonic Orchestra	If I Can Dream	RCA/Legacy Recordings	6 November 2015	3
154	Adele	25 †	XL Recordings	27 November 2015	5
2016
re	Elvis Presley with the Royal Philharmonic Orchestra	If I Can Dream	RCA/Legacy Recordings	1 January 2016	1
re	Adele	25	XL Recordings	8 January 2016	1
155	David Bowie	Blackstar †	Columbia/ISO	15 January 2016	7
156	Steve Mason	Meet The Humans	Double Six	4 March 2016	1
157	The Coral	Distance Inbetween	Ignition	11 March 2016	1
158	Jeff Buckley	You and I	Columbia/Legacy Recordings	18 March 2016	1
159	Iggy Pop	Post Pop Depression	Caroline/IGHO	25 March 2016	1
160	Joe Bonamassa	Blues of Desperation	Provogue	1 April 2016	1
161	The Last Shadow Puppets	Everything You've Come to Expect	Domino Recordings	8 April 2016	2
162	David Bowie	The Man Who Sold the World	Parlophone	22 April 2016	1
163	PJ Harvey	The Hope Six Demolition Project	Island	29 April 2016	1
164	Brian Eno	The Ship	Warp	6 May 2016	1
165	Gregory Porter	Take Me to the Alley	Blue Note	13 May 2016	1
166	James Blake	The Colour in Anything	Polydor	20 May 2016	1
167	Bob Dylan	Fallen Angels	Columbia	27 May 2016	1
168	Catfish & The Bottlemen	The Ride	Island	3 June 2016	1
169	Paul Simon	Stranger to Stranger	Concord/EMI	10 June 2016	1
169	Tom Odell	Wrong Crowd	Columbia	17 June 2016	1
170	Radiohead	A Moon Shaped Pool	XL Recordings	24 June 2016	2
171	Blink 182	California	BMG	8 July 2016	1
172	Biffy Clyro	Ellipsis	14th Floor	15 July 2016	1
173	Michael Kiwanuka	Love & Hate	Polydor	22 July 2016	1
re	Radiohead	A Moon Shaped Pool	XL Recordings	29 July 2016	2
174	Wild Beasts	Boy King	Domino Recordings	12 August 2016	1
175	Thee Oh Sees	A Weird Exits	Castle Face	19 August 2016	1
176	Ryley Walker	Golden Sings That Have Been Sung	Dead Oceans	26 August 2016	1
177	Glass Animals	How to Be a Human Being	Wolf Tone	2 September 2016	1
178	Jamie T	Trick	Virgin	9 September 2016	1
179	Nick Cave & The Bad Seeds	Skeleton Tree	Bad Seed	16 September 2016	3
180	Bon Iver	22, A Million	Jagjaguwar	7 October 2016	1
181	Goat	Requiem	Rocket Recordings	14 October 2016	1
182	Two Door Cinema Club	Gameshow	Parlophone	21 October 2016	1
183	Leonard Cohen	You Want It Darker	Columbia	28 October 2016	2
184	Lambchop	FLOTUS	City Slang	11 November 2016	1
re	Leonard Cohen	You Want It Darker	Columbia	18 November 2016	1
185	Metallica	Hardwired... to Self-Destruct	Blackened/Vertigo	25 November 2016	1
186	Kate Bush	Before The Dawn	Noble & Brite	2 December 2016	1
187	The Rolling Stones	Blue & Lonesome	Polydor	9 December 2016	4
2017
188	Rose Elinor Dougall	Stellular	Unknown RCH	6 January 2017	1
re	David Bowie	Blackstar	Columbia/ISO	13 January 2017	1
189	The xx	I See You	Young Turks Recordings	20 January 2017	1
190	Frank Carter & The Rattlesnakes	Modern Ruin	International Death Cult	27 January 2017	1
191	Ty Segall	Ty Segall	Drag City	3 February 2017	1
192	Elbow	Little Fictions	Polydor	10 February 2017	1
193	Rag'n'Bone Man	Human	Best Laid Plans/Columbia	17 February 2017	1
194	Ryan Adams	Prisoner	Blue Note/PAX AM	24 February 2017	1
re	Rag'n'Bone Man	Human	Best Laid Plans/Columbia	3 March 2017	1
195	Ed Sheeran	÷ †	Asylum	10 March 2017	4
196	Goldfrapp	Silver Eye	Mute	7 April 2017	1
197	Father John Misty	Pure Comedy	Bella Union	14 April 2017	2
198	David Bowie	Cracked Actor (Live Los Angeles '74)	Parlophone	28 April 2017	1
199	Gorillaz	Humanz	Parlophone	5 May 2017	1
200	Slowdive	Slowdive	Dead Oceans	12 May 2017	1
201	Paul Weller	A Kind Revolution	Parlophone	19 May 2017	1
202	Jane Weaver	Modern Kosmology	Fire	26 May 2017	1
203	The Beatles	Sgt. Pepper's Lonely Hearts Club Band	EMI	2 June 2017	1
204	alt-J	Relaxer	Infectious	9 June 2017	1
205	London Grammar	Truth Is a Beautiful Thing	Ministry of Sound	16 June 2017	1
206	Royal Blood	How Did We Get So Dark?	Warner Bros	23 June 2017	1
207	Radiohead	OK Computer	XL Recordings	30 June 2017	2
208	Public Service Broadcasting	Every Valley	Play It Again Sam	14 July 2017	1
209	The Vamps	Night & Day	EMI	21 July 2017	1
210	Declan McKenna	What Do You Think About the Car?	Columbia	28 July 2017	1
211	Arcade Fire	Everything Now	Columbia	4 August 2017	2
212	The Cribs	24-7 Rock Star S**t	Sonic Blew	18 August 2017	1
213	Everything Everything	A Fever Dream	RCA	25 August 2017	1
214	Queens of the Stone Age	Villains	Matador	1 September 2017	1
215	LCD Soundsystem	American Dream	Columbia/DFA	8 September 2017	1
216	The National	Sleep Well Beast	4AD	15 September 2017	1
217	Foo Fighters	Concrete and Gold	Columbia	22 September 2017	1
218	The Killers	Wonderful Wonderful	EMI	29 September 2017	1
219	Wolf Alice	Visions of a Life	Dirty Hit	6 October 2017	1
220	Liam Gallagher	As You Were	Warner Bros	13 October 2017	1
221	Courtney Barnett & Kurt Vile	Lotta Sea Lice	Marathon Artists	20 October 2017	1
222	Jessie Ware	Glasshouse	Island	27 October 2017	1
223	Baxter Dury	Prince of Tears	PIAS Le Label	3 November 2017	1
224	Bob Dylan	Trouble No More – The Bootleg Series 13	Sony Music CG	10 November 2017	1
225	Sam Smith	The Thrill of it All	Capitol	17 November 2017	1
226	Morrissey	Low in High School	BMG	24 November 2017	1
227	Noel Gallagher's High Flying Birds	Who Built the Moon?	Sour Mash	1 December 2017	1
228	U2	Songs of Experience	Island	8 December 2017	1
re	Noel Gallagher's High Flying Birds	Who Built the Moon?	Sour Mash	15 December 2017	1
re	Ed Sheeran	÷ †	Asylum	22 December 2017	2
2018
re	Noel Gallagher's High Flying Birds	Who Built the Moon?	Sour Mash	5 January 2018	1
229	Neil Young & Promise of the Real	The Visitor	Reprise	12 January 2018	1
230	Shame	Songs of Praise	Dead Oceans	19 January 2018	1
231	First Aid Kit	Ruins	Columbia	26 January 2018	1
232	Django Django	Marble Skies	Because Music	2 February 2018	1
233	Hookworms	Microshift	Domino	9 February 2018	1
234	The Wombats	Beautiful People Will Ruin Your Life	The Wombats	16 February 2018	1
235	Everything Is Recorded	Everything Is Recorded	XL Recordings	23 February 2018	1
236	Insecure Men	Insecure Men	Fat Possum	2 March 2018	1
237	The Breeders	All Nerve	4AD	9 March 2018	1
238	Young Fathers	Cocoa Sugar	Ninja Tune	16 March 2018	1
239	The Magic Gang	The Magic Gang	Warner Bros/Yala	23 March 2018	1
240	Jack White	Boarding House Reach	Third Man/XL Recs	30 March 2018	1
241	The Vaccines	Combat Sports	Columbia	6 April 2018	1
242	Goat Girl	Goat Girl	Rough Trade	13 April 2018	1
243	Manic Street Preachers	Resistance Is Futile	Columbia	20 April 2018	1
244	David Bowie	Welcome to the Blackout (Live London '78)	Parlophone	27 April 2018	1
245	Blossoms	Cool Like You	EMI	4 May 2018	1
246	Gaz Coombes	World's Strongest Man	Hot Fruit	11 May 2018	1
247	Arctic Monkeys	Tranquility Base Hotel & Casino †	Domino Recordings	18 May 2018	1
248	Courtney Barnett	Tell Me How You Really Feel	Marathon Artists	25 May 2018	1
249	Snow Patrol	Wildness	Polydor	1 June 2018	1
250	LUMP	LUMP	Dead Oceans	8 June 2018	1
251	Gruff Rhys	Babelsberg	Rough Trade	15 June 2018	1
252	Johnny Marr	Call The Comet	New Voodoo	22 June 2018	1
253	Kamasi Washington	Heaven And Earth	Young Turks Recordings	29 June 2018	1
254	Let's Eat Grandma	I'm All Ears	Transgressive	6 July 2018	1
255	Tom Grennan	Lighting Matches	Insanity	13 July 2018	1
256	Vamps	Night & Day	EMI	20 July 2018	1
257	Protoje	A Matter Of Time	Mr Bongo	27 July 2018	1
258	Kyle Falconer	No Thank You	Riverman	3 August 2018	1
259	Deaf Havana	Rituals	So Recordings	10 August 2018	1
260	Kathryn Joseph	From When I Wake The Want Is	Rock Action	17 August 2018	1
261	Slaves	Acts of Fear and Love	EMI	24 August 2018	1
262	Interpol	Marauder	Matador	31 August 2018	1
263	IDLES	Joy as an Act of Resistance	Partisan	7 September 2018	1
264	Spiritualized	And Nothing Hurt	Bella Union	14 September 2018	1
265	Pale Waves	My Mind Makes Noises	Dirty Hit	21 September 2018	1
266	Suede	The Blue Hour	Rhino	28 September 2018	1
267	Nile Rodgers & Chic	It's About Time	EMI	5 October 2018	1
268	You Me at Six	VI	Underdog	12 October 2018	1
269	Kurt Vile	Bottle It In	Matador	19 October 2018	2
270	Tom Odell	Jubilee Road	Columbia	2 November 2018	1
271	Bill Ryder-Jones	Yawn	Domino Recordings	9 November 2018	1
272	Architects	Holy Hell	Epitaph	16 November 2018	1
273	Mumford & Sons	Delta	Gentlemen Of The Road/Island	23 November 2018	1
re	Shame	Songs of Praise	Dead Oceans	30 November 2018	1
274	1975	A Brief Inquiry into Online Relationships	Dirty Hit/Polydor	7 December 2018	1
275	Aidan Moffat & RM Hubbert	Ghost Stories For Christmas	Rock Action	14 December 2018	1
276	Bruce Springsteen	Springsteen on Broadway	Columbia	21 December 2018	1
277	George Ezra	Staying at Tamara's	Columbia	28 December 2018	1
2019
278	Low	Double Negative	Sub Pop	4 January 2019	1
re	IDLES	Joy as an Act of Resistance	Partisan	11 January 2019	1
279	You Tell Me	You Tell Me	Memphis Industries	18 January 2019	1
280	Twilight Sad	It Won/t Be Like This All the Time	Rock Action	25 January 2019	1
281	Bring Me the Horizon	Amo	RCA	1 February 2019	1
282	Busted	Half Way There	East West	8 February 2019	1
283	Yak	Pursuit of Momentary Happiness	EMI	15 February 2019	1
284	William The Conqueror	Bleeding On The Soundtrack	Loose Music	22 February 2019	1
285	Sleaford Mods	Eton Alive	Extreme Eating	1 March 2019	1
286	Tom Walker	What a Time to Be Alive	Relentless	8 March 2019	1
287	Foals	Everything Not Saved Will Be Lost – Part 1 †	Warner Bros	15 March 2019	1
288	Jack Savoretti	Singing to Strangers	BMG	22 March 2019	1
289	Lucy Rose	No Words Left	Communion	29 March 2019	1
290	Unkle	The Road: Part II (Lost Highway)	Songs For The Def	5 April 2019	1
291	Circa Waves	What's It Like Over There?	Prolifica	12 April 2019	1
292	Fontaines D.C.	Dogrel	Partisan	19 April 2019	1
293	Loyle Carner	Not Waving, but Drowning	EMI	26 April 2019	1
294	Aldous Harding	Designer	4AD	3 May 2019	1
295	Frank Carter & The Rattlesnakes	End of Suffering	International Death Cult	10 May 2019	1
296	Mac DeMarco	Here Comes the Cowboy	Caroline	17 May 2019	1
297	Lewis Capaldi	Divinely Uninspired to a Hellish Extent	EMI	24 May 2019	1
298	Amazons	Future Dust	Fiction	31 May 2019	1
299	Richard Hawley	Further	BMG	7 June 2019	1
300	Aurora	A Different Kind of Human – Step 2	Decca	14 June 2019	1
301	Bruce Springsteen	Western Stars	Columbia	21 June 2019	1
302	Two Door Cinema Club	False Alarm	Prolifica	28 June 2019	1
303	Black Keys	Let's Rock	Nonesuch	5 July 2019	1
304	Lighthouse Family	Blue Sky In Your Head	Polydor	12 July 2019	1
305	Palace	Life After	Fiction	19 July 2019	1
306	Thom Yorke	Anima	XL Recordings	26 July 2019	1
307	Kaiser Chiefs	Duck	Polydor	2 August 2019	1
re	Thom Yorke	Anima	XL Recordings	9 August 2019	1
308	Feeder	Tallulah	Believe	16 August 2019	1
309	Ride	This Is Not a Safe Place	Wichita Recordings	23 August 2019	1
310	Frank Turner	No Man's Land	Polydor	30 August 2019	1
311	S.L.P.	The S.L.P.	Columbia	6 September 2019	1
312	Bat for Lashes	Lost Girls	Bat for Lashes	13 September 2019	1
313	Metronomy	Metronomy Forever	Because Music	20 September 2019	1
314	Keane	Cause and Effect	Island	27 September 2019	1
315	Beatles	Abbey Road	Apple Corps	4 October 2019	1
316	Dermot Kennedy	Without Fear	Island	11 October 2019	1
317	Elbow	Giants of All Sizes	Polydor	18 October 2019	1
318	Foals	Everything Not Saved Will Be Lost – Part 2	Warner Records	25 October 2019	1
319	Rex Orange County	Pony	Sony Music	1 November 2019	1
320	Michael Kiwanuka	Kiwanuka	Polydor	8 November 2019	1
321	Snow Patrol	Reworked	Polydor	15 November 2019	1
322	Nick Cave & The Bad Seeds	Ghosteen	Ghosteen	22 November 2019	1
323	Leonard Cohen	Thanks for the Dance	Columbia	29 November 2019	1
324	Jme	Grime MC	Boy Better Know	6 December 2019	1
325	Who	Who	Polydor	13 December 2019	1
326	Stormzy	Heavy Is the Head	Atlantic / Merky	20 December 2019	1
re	Nick Cave & The Bad Seeds	Ghosteen	Ghosteen	27 December 2019	1

=== By artist ===
Thirty Four artists topped the chart for at least three weeks.

Artist	Number-one album(s)	Weeks at number one
David Bowie	5	13
Ed Sheeran	2	10
Adele	1	6
Arctic Monkeys	2	6
Radiohead	2	6
Mumford & Sons	3	5
Nick Cave and the Bad Seeds	2	5
Noel Gallagher's High Flying Birds	2	5
Elvis Presley	1	4
Foals	4	4
Frank Turner	4	4
Leonard Cohen	2	4
Neil Young	2	4
The Rolling Stones	1	4
Arcade Fire	2	3
Bring Me The Horizon	3	3
Bruce Springsteen	3	3
Crazy Horse	1	3
The Cribs	3	3
Father John Misty	2	3
Frank Carter & The Rattlesnakes	3	3
Jack White	3	3
Led Zeppelin	2	3
Manic Street Preachers	3	3
Muse	2	3
Robbie Williams	1	3
Roger Daltrey	1	3
Royal Blood	2	3
Sam Smith	2	3
Tom Odell	3	3
The Vaccines	3	3
Wilko Johnson	1	3
Wolf Alice	2	3
The xx	2	3
