= Jaws discography =

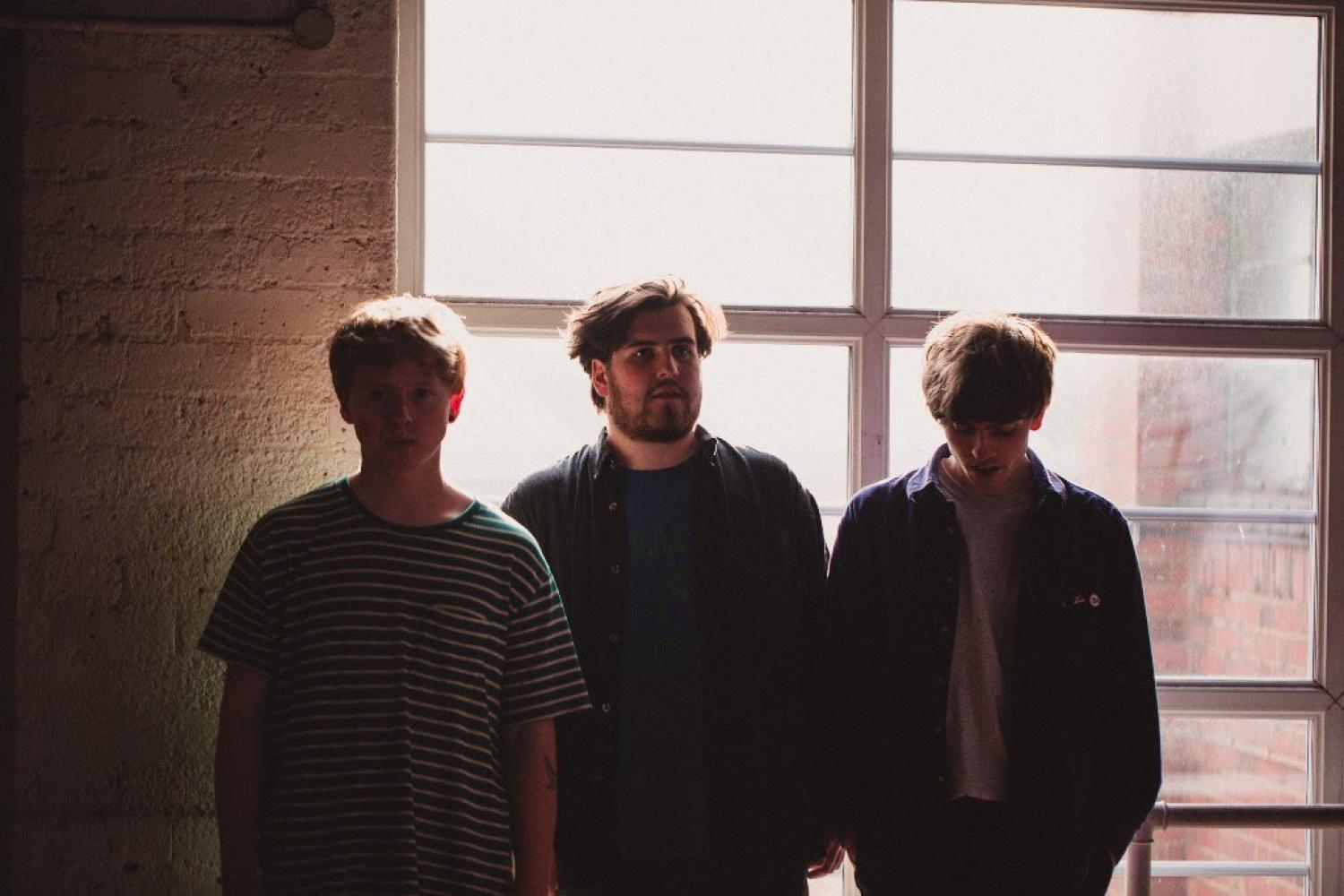
- Studio albums: 3
- EPs: 2
- Singles: 16
- B-sides: 3
- Music videos: 9

Jaws are an English indie rock band formed in Birmingham, England in 2012 after singer Connor Schofield had posted a demo (Cameron) online that received enough positive feedback to encourage him to start a band with friends from Halesowen College. The band's discography includes three studio albums, two extended plays, and 16 singles.

The band released their first studio album Be Slowly in 2014 through SideOneDummy Records, following the release of their two extended plays: Milkshake and Gold, which were both released in 2013. Since their first studio album, Jaws have released two self-released studio albums: Simplicity in 2016 and The Ceiling in 2019.

== Studio albums ==
Year	Title	UK Charts
2014	Be Slowly: Released: 15 September 2014; Digital download, CD, vinyl	73
2016	Simplicity: Released: 4 November 2016; Digital download, CD, vinyl	-
2019	The Ceiling: Released: 5 April 2019; Digital download	-

== Extended plays ==
Year	Title
2013	Milkshake: Released: 21 April 2013; Digital download; Vinyl 12" (Blue) (Limited 250); Vinyl 12" (Pink) (Limited 300)
2013	Gold: Released: 28 July 2013; Digital download only
2023	If It Wasn't For My Friends, Things Could Be Different: Released: 15 September 2023; Digital download only

== Singles ==
Year	Title
2012	"Toucan Surf" / "Donut": Released: 26 Aug 2012; Digital download only
2012	"Surround You" / "Stay In": Released: 3 Dec 2012; Digital download only
2013	"Friend Like You" / "Breeze": Released: 31 Mar 2013; Digital download only
2013	"Gold": Released: 28 Jul 2013; Digital download only
2014	"Think Too Much, Feel Too Little": Released: 6 March 2014; Digital download
2014	"Be Slowly": Released: 7 July 2014; Digital download only
2014	"Swim": Released: 25 August 2014; Digital download only
2015	"Bad Company": Released: 1 May 2015; Digital download only
2015	"What We Haven't Got Yet": Released: 23 September 2015; Digital download only
2016	"Right In Front Of Me": Released: 7 September 2016; Digital download/vinyl
2016	"Work It Out": Released: 6 October 2016; Digital download only
2016	"Just A Boy": Released: 27 October 2016; Digital download only
