= 1998 (instrumental) =

Instrumental song

Single by Binary Finary
- Released: 1998
- Recorded: 1997
- Genre: Uplifting trance
- Length: 8:01
- Label: Positiva
- Composers: Matt Laws; Stuart Matheson

"1998" is an instrumental music track by British trance act Binary Finary, originally released in 1997 on the Aquarius label with "Zapya" as the B-side. When released the following year in 1998 on the Positiva label, the single peaked at No. 24 on the UK Singles Chart. The track was subsequently remixed numerous times under the title of the year the remix was produced (i.e. "1999", "2000", etc.). "1999" peaked at No. 11 and "2000" reached No. 84 in the UK.

In 2010, Armada Music released 1998 (The 2010 Mixes), featuring remixes by Vegas Baby!, Alex M.O.R.P.H., Dabruck & Klein, TyDi & Dennis Sheperd, Vadim Soloviev, Kaimo K, and a 2010 mix.

In 2012, the song was covered by Peace under the title "1998 (Delicious)" on their debut EP, EP Delicious. This version adds lyrics to the song.

On 9 September 2013, a 15th anniversary package was released through Armada Music containing remixes by Jordan Suckley, Kissy Sell Out, Daniel Wanrooy, and James Dymond

A 20th anniversary remix package (including Mark Sixma, Dosem and Binary Finary remixes) was released under Armada Music on 21 December 2018.

A remix by Jose De Mara was released through Armind in 2021.

== Remixers ==
- Adrien Aubrun
- Alex M.O.R.P.H.
- Anfisa Letyago
- Dabruck & Klein
- Daniel Wanrooy
- Darren Porter
- DuMonde (aka JamX & De Leon)
- DuMonde 2026 (aka JamX & D.Mand)
- Dosem
- Gouryella
- James Dymond
- Jon Craig & Jay Cosgrove
- Jordan Suckley
- Jose De Mara
- Kaimo K
- Kay Cee
- Kissy Sell Out
- Marie Vaunt
- Mark Sixma
- Mark Et Claude
- Markus Schulz & Ferry Corsten pres. New World Punx
- Matt Darey
- Paul Oakenfold
- Paul van Dyk
- Protoculture
- Richard Durand
- Rodrigo Deem
- Ronski Speed
- Setrise
- Tonny Nesse
- twoloud
- tyDi & Dennis Sheperd
- Vadim Soloviev
- Vegas Baby!
- Victor Ruiz

== Other versions ==
- 2009: Francesco Diaz & Young Rebels - "1998" (original mix / Christian Weber remix)
- 2009: Pacific Wave - "1998" (DJ Kharma & Mighty Atom mix / DJ Phunk & 3am mix)
- 2012: Peace - "1998 (Delicious)"
