= Driving at Night =

Driving at Night may refer to:

- "Driving at Night", a song in the musical State Fair
- "Driving at Night", a song by Jaws from the album The Ceiling
- "Driving at Night", a song by Joe Satriani from the album Not of This Earth
