= Out of Touch (disambiguation) =

"Out of Touch" is a song by Hall & Oates, from the album Big Bam Boom.

Out of Touch may also refer to:

- Out of touch (phrase) or "square"
- "Out of Touch" (Dove Cameron song)
- "Out of Touch (Euphoria)", the second episode of the second season of the American teen drama television series Euphoria
- "Out of Touch", by The Grass Roots, from the album Let's Live for Today
- "Out of Touch", by Lucinda Williams, from the album Essence
- "Out of Touch", by Squeeze, from the album Sweets from a Stranger

== See also ==
- Out of Touch in the Wild, an album by English indie rock band Dutch Uncles
