= B-Town =

English indie music scene in Digbeth

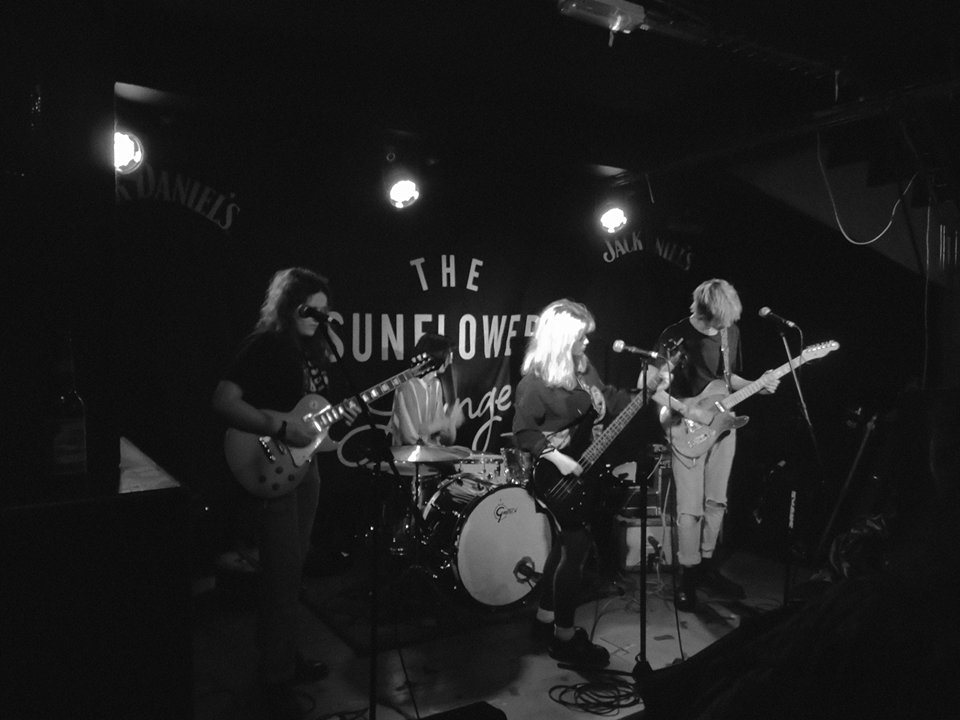
Frank

B-Town is the name given to an indie music scene based in the Digbeth area of Birmingham, United Kingdom. B-Town bands include Peace, Swim Deep, JAWS, Sugarthief, Dakota Beats and Spilt Milk Society.

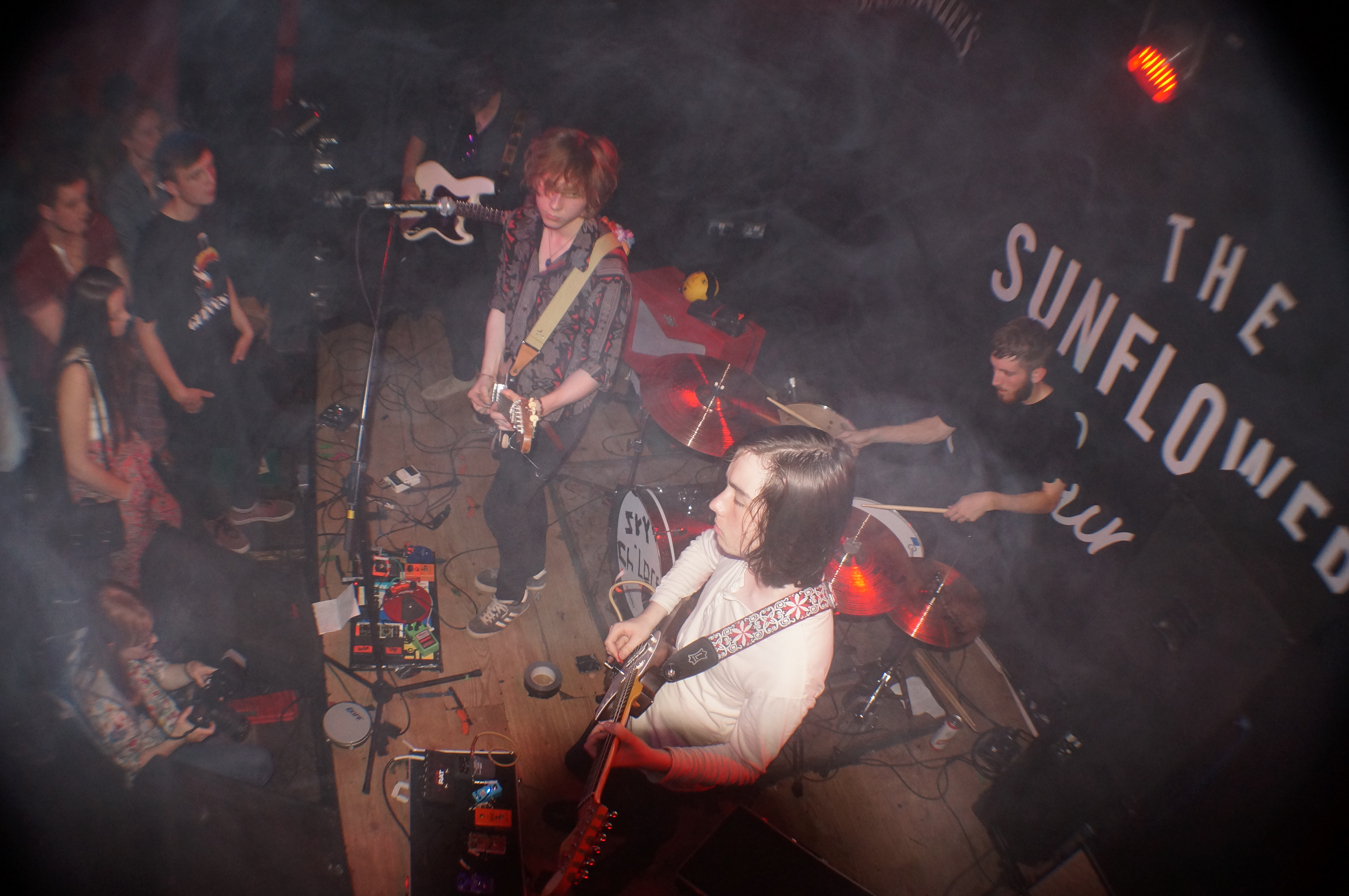
Sky Children

== Details ==
Some local commentators have suggested the term is an invention by London-based journalists to talk the wider Birmingham music scene up as a fad, pointing out that "there have been bands going strong in Birmingham for years" and highlighting the variety and strength in depth of the music being created in the city. In July 2013 Cavan McCarthy of Swim Deep claimed that the term started off as a joke, invented by himself and Harry Koisser of Peace while driving back into Birmingham from outside the city, and that "now everyone says it and we’re a bit embarrassed about it".

Critics have pointed out that many of the scene's leading bands don't sound very similar, though others have identified a common element as how the bands "all incorporate a slightly flippant attitude to their music, not concentrating on polishing their records to perfection, but playing for the joy of creating music and for entertaining their audiences." The NME has commented how "nonchalance courses through the scene’s veins like quicksilver ... some scenes come roaring out of the traps; B-Town seemed to roll out of bed, insular and uncontrived, smirking at its own in-jokes, smelling faintly of K cider and intent on nothing loftier than the pursuit of a laugh."

== B-Town bands ==
- Peace
- Swim Deep
- JAWS
- Troumaca
