= Boy toy =

Boy toy may refer to:

- Boys' toys and games
- Boy Toy (novel), a 2007 novel by Barry Lyga
- Boy Toy (film), a 2011 film starring John White
- Boy Toy/Inspection Detection, an episode of the TV show The Fairly OddParents
- Boytoy (band), an American rock band
- A belt worn by Madonna, originally on a wedding dress for the 1984 album cover of Like a Virgin
  - Boy Toy Inc., a subsidiary of Semtex Girls, a production company owned by Madonna
- The name of a fashion collection (French: l'homme objet) by Jean Paul Gaultier

== See also ==
- Toy boy (disambiguation)
