= Andrew Davey =

Australian rugby league footballer

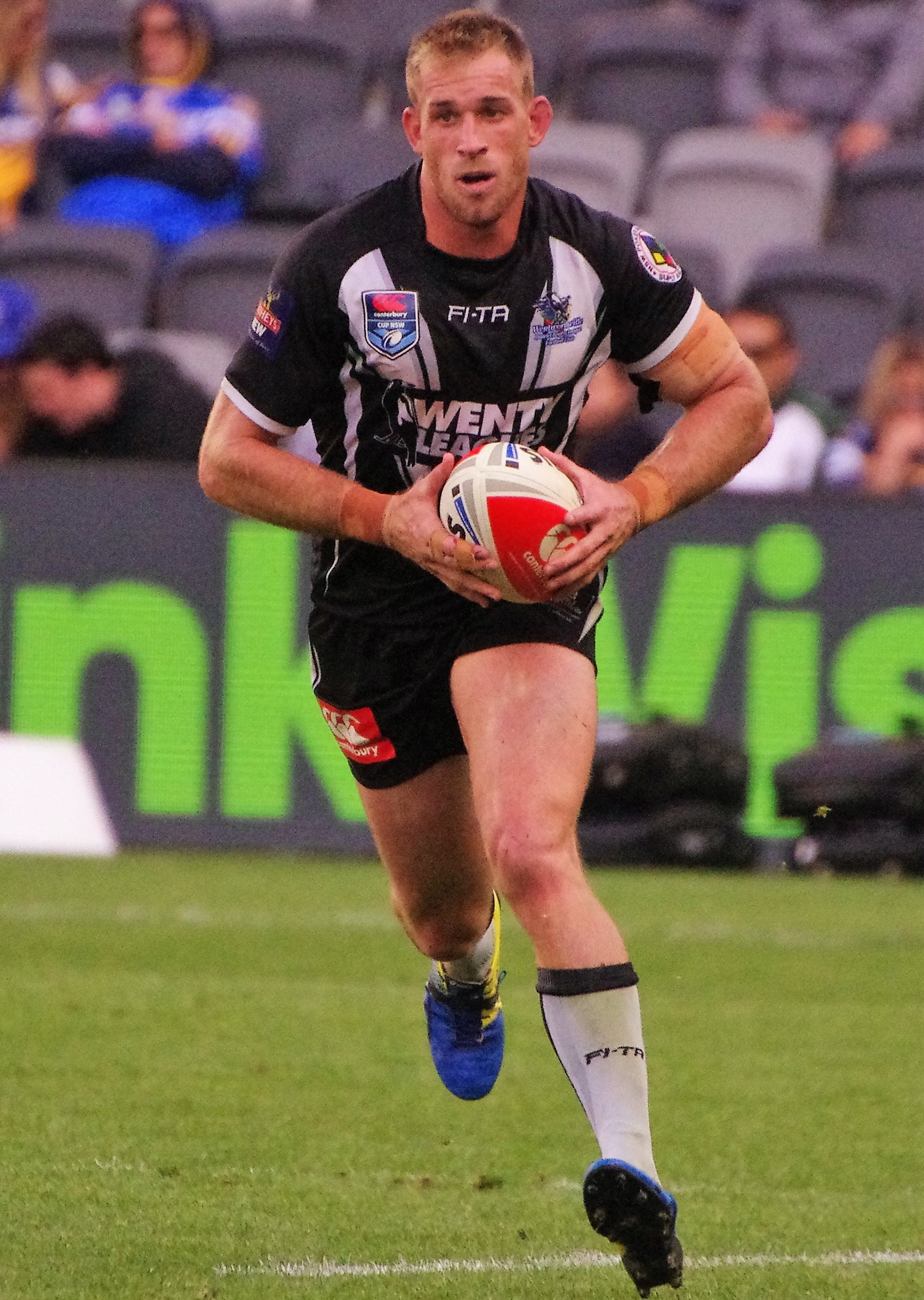

Personal information
- Born: 29 November 1991 (age 34) Maryborough, Queensland, Australia

Playing information
- Height: 195 cm (6 ft 5 in)
- Weight: 106 kg (16 st 10 lb)
- Position: Second-row
Club
Years	Team	Pld	T	G	FG	P
2020	Parramatta Eels	10	0	0	0	0
2021–22	Manly Sea Eagles	20	3	0	0	12
2023	Canterbury Bulldogs	2	0	0	0	0
2023	Parramatta Eels	12	2	0	0	8
	Total	44	5	0	0	20

Andrew Davey (born 29 November 1991) is an Australian former professional rugby league footballer who last played as a second-row forward for the Parramatta Eels in the NRL.

He also played for the Manly Warringah Sea Eagles & Canterbury-Bankstown Bulldogs.

== Background ==
Born in Maryborough, Queensland, Davey played his junior rugby league for the Emerald Cowboys.

== Playing career ==
In 2016, Davey joined the Mackay Cutters in the Queensland Cup on a train-and-trial deal, later earning a full-time contract with the club. That season, he won the club's Rookie of the Year award. In 2017, he co-captained the Cutters alongside Setaimata Sa.

In 2018, Davey signed with the Townsville Blackhawks. In 2019, Davey joined the Parramatta Eels NRL squad. He spent the season with their New South Wales Cup feeder club, Wentworthville, playing in their Grand Final loss to Newtown.

=== 2020 ===
In round 10 of the 2020 NRL season, Davey made his first grade debut for Parramatta against the Manly-Warringah Sea Eagles. In his second NRL appearance, Davey played 51 minutes off the bench replacing Ryan Matterson who was ruled out through HIA in Parramatta's 26–16 win over the Wests Tigers. At 28 years and 233 days old, he became the fourth-oldest debutant in the NRL era (since 1998) after Brian Carney, Darren Nicholls, and Darren Porter.

On 12 October, Davey signed a two-year deal to join Manly-Warringah.

=== 2021 ===
Davey made his club debut for Manly in round 1 of the 2021 NRL season against the Sydney Roosters at the SCG. After Manly's round 2 loss against South Sydney, it was revealed that Davey had suffered a season ending knee injury.

=== 2022 ===
Davey played a total of 18 games for Manly in the 2022 NRL season scoring three tries. Manly would finish the year in 11th place and miss out on the finals. At the conclusion of the year, Davey signed a contract to join Canterbury ahead of the 2023 NRL season.

=== 2023 ===
Davey made his club debut for Canterbury in their 30–4 loss against Parramatta. On 28 April, Davey was granted an immediate release from his Canterbury contract to join his former club Parramatta. In round 10 of the 2023 NRL season, Davey made his second club debut for Parramatta in their 24–26 loss against the Gold Coast. Davey scored a try during the game. On 2 September, Davey spoke out to the media about his time at Canterbury stating “The way the Bulldogs went about things, I didn’t like it, It wasn’t a culture that I fitted in with and it wasn’t the style of coaching that I resonated with, Players had concerns (at Canterbury), but they weren’t at panic stations,” he said. “I had a couple of gripes, but I won’t go into specifics. We weren’t all pulling the same way. It just wasn’t my cup of tea, and a lot different to what I’ve experienced at Manly and Parramatta". “It wasn’t great with Cameron,” Davey said. “In the end we didn’t talk when I was leaving. It was very cold. I didn’t get the ideology of the coaches. It wasn’t a process that I’d been accustomed to".

The following day, former Canterbury player James Graham launched a public attack on Davey through his podcast stating "I don't like going after players, but Andrew Davey, he's put himself in the firing line, "I think the truth needs to come out in that situation. Andrew Davey came to the club thinking he was going to play every week and he got outworked by a 21-year-old called Jacob Preston, and he embarrassed him. That's why Andrew Davey isn't happy, because he came under the pretence of, 'I'm going to play every week', and a 21-year-old put him in his place and he couldn't get in the team. So he kicks his toys and pisses off to Parramatta. Unlucky mate. You didn't like it cause you weren't getting picked and a 21-year-old Jacob Preston …. has shoved it up your arse, see ya later!". On 18 October, Davey announced his retirement from rugby league effective immediately.
