= EP Delicious =

EP by Peace
- Released: 7 September 2012
- Recorded: 2011–2012
- Genre: Indie rock
- Length: 20:20
- Label: Columbia
- Producer: Jim Abbiss

Peace chronology
EP Delicious (2012)	In Love (2013)

EP Delicious is the debut extended play from English rock band Peace. The extended play was first released on 7 September 2012 through Columbia Records in the United Kingdom.

The extended play consists of four tracks, including "Bloodshake" (formerly known by its demo title, "Bblood") and "1998"; a cover of the Binary Finary song of the same name. Both "California Daze" and "Bloodshake" featured in NME's 'Top 50 Songs of 2012'; at numbers thirteen and forty-three respectively.

== Track listing ==
Side A
No.	Title	Writer(s)	Producer(s)	Length
1.	"Ocean's Eye"	Harrison Koisser	Jim Abbiss	2:21
2.	"Bloodshake"	Koisser	Abbiss	3:55
3.	"California Daze"	Koisser	Abbiss	3:56

Side B
No.	Title	Writer(s)	Producer(s)	Length
1.	"1998 (Delicious)"	Matt Laws	Abbiss	10:08

== Critical reception ==
Professional ratings
Review scores
Source	Rating
NME	9/10 stars
BBC	Positive

The extended play was met with positive reviews, including from Tom Howard—of NME—who gave EP Delicious nine out of a possible ten stars: "Opener "Ocean's Eye" is two minutes of Pulp at their creepiest and randiest, but twisted into something roguish and chaotic. "Bloodshake"'s guitars and bongo-infused drums are as colourful as a pineapple, papaya and mango salad, and give way to singer Harry Koisser demanding "Spit blood at the sun, spit blood in the ocean". "California Daze", meanwhile, is a softer love song about a girl who "tastes like sunlight". But most impressive of all is "1998 (Delicious)", on which the Brummie quartet take Binary Finary's trance classic of the same name and turn it into a post-rock monster that's 10 million times more exciting than any Explosions in the Sky song ever. It builds and teases before bursting into an earful of cymbals and wailing its way to a messy finale. Clever, confident, ambitious. All of it." Mike Diver—of the BBC—also praised EP Delicious, reviewing the final track as "The 10-minute 1998 ends this set on a triumphant high, though. A sort of Kraut-kissed Pink Floyd-goes-LCD Soundsystem affair giving way to some Comets on Fire-recalling comedown psychedelia, it’s a fairly sky-scraping finale. And it’s a perplexing final puzzle piece, confirming this band’s should-be-contenders status without actually nailing down a signature sound.

== Release history ==
Region	Date	Format
United Kingdom	7 September 2012	Digital EP
United Kingdom	9 September 2012	12" vinyl
