= Toy Boy =

Toy Boy may refer to:

- Toy boy (slang), a male partner or companion who is younger in age

== Film and television ==
- Toy Boy (film), a 2009 American comedy
- Toy Boy (TV series), a 2019 Spanish series

== Music ==
- "Toy Boy" (song), a song by Sinitta
- "Toy Boy", a song by Mika from the 2009 album The Boy Who Knew Too Much (album)
- "Toy Boy", a song by Stuck in the Sound
- "Toyboy", a song by M.A.D

== See also ==
- Boy toy (disambiguation)
