= Kindness Is the New Rock and Roll =

Studio album by Peace
- Released: 4 May 2018
- Genre: Indie rock
- Length: 35:06
- Label: Ignition
- Producer: Simone Felice

Peace chronology
Happy People (2015)	Kindness Is the New Rock and Roll (2018)

Singles from Kindness Is the New Rock and Roll
- 1. "From Under Liquid Glass" Released: 12 December 2017; 2. "Power" Released: 17 April 2018

Kindness Is the New Rock and Roll is the third studio album by British indie rock band Peace, released on 4 May 2018. Kindness Is the New Rock and Roll was produced by Simone Felice.

== Critical reception ==
Professional ratings
Aggregate scores
Source	Rating
Metacritic	74/100
Review scores
Source	Rating
AllMusic	3.5/5 stars
NME	4/5 stars
Clash	7/10 stars
The Edge	5/5 stars
The Independent	4/5 stars
DIY	4/5 stars
Q	3/5 stars

Kindness Is the New Rock and Roll received generally positive reviews upon release, gaining a score of 8/10 with NME, and 8/10 from The Independent, and positive reviews from DIY, who stated that Harry Koisser was "the ideal frontperson: a head mix of swaggering bombast, fashionable loucheness and your mate down the local spewing inspirational Tumblr quotes at closing time". However, Q gave the album a more mixed review of 6/10, saying that they "occasionally slip into boilerplate territory". Most reviewers believed it was a return to form for the band.

== Track listing ==
No.	Title	Length
1.	"Power"	3:03
2.	"Kindness Is the New Rock and Roll"	2:43
3.	"Silverlined"	3:34
4.	"You Don't Walk Away from Love"	3:07
5.	"From Under Liquid Glass"	4:41
6.	"Magnificent"	3:03
7.	"Angel"	4:05
8.	"Shotgun Hallelujah"	4:16
9.	"Just a Ride"	2:35
10.	"Choose Love"	3:59
Total length:		35:06

== Personnel ==
- Harrison Koisser – lead vocals, guitar
- Samuel Koisser – bass guitar, backing vocals
- Douglas Castle – lead guitar
- Dominic Boyce – drums, backing vocals
