= O Shudder =

Studio album by Dutch Uncles
- Released: 23 February 2015
- Genres: Indie rock, indie pop
- Length: 41:37
- Label: Memphis Industries

Dutch Uncles chronology
Out of Touch in the Wild (2013)	O Shudder (2015)	Big Balloon (2017)

Professional ratings
Aggregate scores
Source	Rating
Metacritic	78/100
Review scores
Source	Rating
AllMusic	4/5 stars
Consequence of Sound	C
DIY	4/5 stars
Drowned in Sound	8/10
The Guardian	4/5 stars
MusicOMH	3.5/5 stars
NME	8/10
Pitchfork	7/10
The Skinny	3/5 stars
Under the Radar	7.5/10 stars

O Shudder is the fourth studio album by English indie rock band Dutch Uncles, released on 23 February 2015.

== Track listing ==
All lyrics by Duncan Wallis, all music by Robin Richards

No.	Title	Length
1.	"Babymaking"	3:44
2.	"Upsilon"	4:43
3.	"Drips"	4:25
4.	"Decided Knowledge"	3:04
5.	"I Should Have Read"	3:05
6.	"In n Out"	3:11
7.	"Given Thing"	3:34
8.	"Don't Sit Back (Frankie Said)"	4:20
9.	"Accelerate"	3:18
10.	"Tidal Weight"	3:36
11.	"Be Right Back"	4:37

== Personnel ==
Dutch Uncles

- Peter Broadhead - electric guitar, marimba
- Andy Proudfoot - drums, backing vocals
- Robin Richards - bass guitar, vibraphone, backing vocals
- Daniel Spedding - electric guitar
- Duncan Wallis - lead vocals, piano

Additional musicians

- John Purton - violin
- Jote Osahn - violin
- Natalie Purton - viola
- Margit van der Zwan - cello
- Rachael Gladwin - harp
- Daniel Thompson - flute, clarinet, oboe, bass clarinet

Technical staff

- Brendan Williams - recording and production
- Phil Bulleyment - engineering, mixing
- George Atkins - mastering
