= Wraith (song) =

Single by Peace

from the album In Love
- B-side: "Scumbag"
- Released: 13 January 2013
- Recorded: 2012
- Genre: alternative rock, funk rock
- Length: 3:11
- Label: Columbia
- Songwriter(s): Harrison Koisser
- Producer(s): Jim Abiss

Peace singles chronology
"Follow Baby" (2012)	"Wraith" (2013)

Music video
- "Wraith" on YouTube "Wraith" (Audio) on YouTube

"Wraith" is a song from indie rock quartet Peace. The track was released in the United Kingdom on 13 January 2013 as the lead single from the band's debut studio album, In Love. "Wraith" was written by the band's front-man Harrison Koisser and was produced by Jim Abbiss (Arctic Monkeys, Adele).

== Track listing ==
Vinyl

1. Wraith – 3:11
2. Scumbag – 3:29

Digital download

1. Wraith – 3:11

== Critical reception ==
Sian Rowe of NME reviewed the track positively, writing

"Wraith is about falling in love with a prostitute", says Peace frontman, Harrison Koisser on his band’s new single. "But not really a prostitute and not really falling in love" he adds, confusingly. Whichever it is, thanks to the lyrics "blow me like a floating feather" Peace can add 'love a good blow job reference' to their rock CV.

== Charts ==
For the chart week dated 26 January 2013, "Wraith" debuted at number seventy-five on the UK Singles Chart—marking the band's first chart appearance.

Chart (2013)	Peak position
UK Singles (The Official Charts Company)	75

== Credits and personnel ==
- Harrison Koisser – writer
- Jim Abiss – producer

== Release history ==
Region	Date	Format
United Kingdom	13 January 2013	Digital Download
