= Big Balloon =

Studio album by Dutch Uncles
- Released: 17 February 2017
- Genres: Art pop, post-punk
- Length: 35:34
- Label: Memphis Industries
- Producers: Brendan Williams and Phil Bulleyment

Dutch Uncles chronology
O Shudder (2015)	Big Balloon (2017)	Polygon Hotel (2027)

Professional ratings
Aggregate scores
Source	Rating
Metacritic	77/100
Review scores
Source	Rating
AllMusic	4.0/5 stars
DIY	4/5 stars
The Line of Best Fit	6/10 stars

Big Balloon is the fifth studio album by English indie rock band Dutch Uncles, released on 17 February 2017. Tom Ewing of Freaky Trigger describes the album as "Herky-jerk nerd pop from Manchester".

== Track listing ==
All lyrics are written by Duncan Wallis; all music is composed by Robin Richards.

No.	Title	Length
1.	"Big Balloon"	3:17
2.	"Baskin'"	3:28
3.	"Combo Box"	3:02
4.	"Same Plane Dream"	3:10
5.	"Achameleon"	3:03
6.	"Hiccup"	3:20
7.	"Streetlight"	4:22
8.	"Oh Yeah"	2:51
9.	"Sink"	4:57
10.	"Overton"	4:04
Total length:		35:34

== Personnel ==
Dutch Uncles

- Peter Broadhead – electric guitar, marimba
- Andy Proudfoot – drums, backing vocals
- Robin Richards – bass guitar, electric guitar, backing vocals
- Duncan Wallis – lead vocals, piano

Additional musicians

- Neil Wright - electric guitar
- Henry Broadhead - synthesisers
- John Purton - violin
- Natalie Purton - violin
- Jote Osahn - viola
- Margit van der Zwan - cello
- Helen Varley - horn
- Harry Cunningham - tuba
- Barry Hyde (The Futureheads) - backing vocals
- Stealing Sheep - backing vocals
- Everything Everything - backing vocals
- Aldous RH - backing vocals

Technical personnel

- Brendan Williams – production, engineering
- Phil Bulleyment – production, engineering, mixing, mastering
- Jamie Birkett – engineering, additional production
- Louis Simmonds – engineering
