= Cadenza (album) =

Studio album by Dutch Uncles
- Released: 25 April 2011
- Recorded: 2010
- Genres: Indie rock, indie pop, alternative rock, math rock, art rock, new prog
- Label: Memphis Industries
- Producers: Brendan Williams and Phil Bulleyment

Dutch Uncles chronology
Dutch Uncles (2009)	Cadenza (2011)	Out of Touch, In the Wild (2013)

Singles from Cadenza
- 1. "Fragrant" Released: 1 November 2010; 2. "Face In" Released: 28 February 2011; 3. "Cadenza" Released: 2 May 2011; 4. "X-O" Released: 4 July 2011; 5. "The Ink" Released: 26 September 2011

Professional ratings
Review scores
Source	Rating
BBC	(very positive)
Clash	6/10 stars
Drowned in Sound	8/10 stars
The Fly Magazine	4/5 stars
The Guardian	3/5 stars
Heineken Music	5/5 stars
MusicOMH	4/5 stars
NME	5/10 stars
This Is Fake DIY	8/10 stars

Cadenza is the second album by the Marple band Dutch Uncles and their first album to receive a release in the UK. It was released on 25 April 2011 as an Audio CD, iTunes digital download and Gatefold vinyl. The album was recorded in Salford in Greater Manchester, England during the summer of 2010.

== Track listing ==
All lyrics are written by Duncan Wallis; all music is composed by Robin Richards (except where noted) and arranged by Dutch Uncles.

No.	Title	Length
1.	"Cadenza"	3:49
2.	"Fragrant"	3:09
3.	"Sting"	3:23
4.	"Dressage"	2:38
5.	"OCDUC"	5:02
6.	"Dolli"	3:17
7.	"X-O"	3:02
8.	"Orval"	3:36
9.	"The Rub"	2:48
10.	"The Ink"	3:58
11.	"Zalo"	3:21

- The song 'X-O' samples 'Electronic Counterpoint' by Steve Reich.
