= Milkshake (EP) =

EP by Jaws
- Released: 21 April 2013 (digital); 6 May 2013 (vinyl)
- Recorded: 2012–2013
- Genre: Indie pop, surf pop, dream pop, indie rock
- Length: 25:23
- Label: Rattlepop

Jaws chronology
Milkshake (2013)	Be Slowly (2014)

Singles from Milkshake
- 1. "Toucan Surf" Released: 26 August 2012; 2. "Surround You" Released: 3 December 2012; 3. "Friend Like You" Released: 31 March 2013

Milkshake is the debut EP by British pop band Jaws. It features both of their singles and their B-sides up until when it was released, and a new single titled "Friend Like You", released on 31 March 2013.

The EP was released on 21 April 2013 through Rattlepop as a digital download. It was meant to be released on vinyl on the same date, but due to delay in the manufacturing of the vinyl made it be pushed to be released on 6 May. It was released on blue vinyl, limited to 250 copies. On August 27, 2013, it was released in Japan on CD. It was re-pressed on pink vinyl in December 2013, limited to 300 copies.

NME gave the EP a fairly positive review saying that Jaws were "making laziness look and sound good since April 2013," as well as saying "no-one has ever sounded so much like the internal monologue of a sunbathing cat."

== Track listing ==
A side

1. "Breeze" - 5:18 ^{[A]}
2. "Donut" - 2:38
3. "Toucan Surf" - 4:49

B side

1. "Friend Like You" - 4:34
2. "Stay In" - 4:44
3. "Surround You" - 4:40
- A Sometimes referred to as "BreeZe"

== Release history ==
Region	Date	Format
United Kingdom	21 April 2013	Digital EP
United Kingdom	6 May 2013	12" blue vinyl
Japan	27 August 2013	CD
United Kingdom	December 2013	12" pink vinyl
