= Official Record Store Chart =

UK music chart

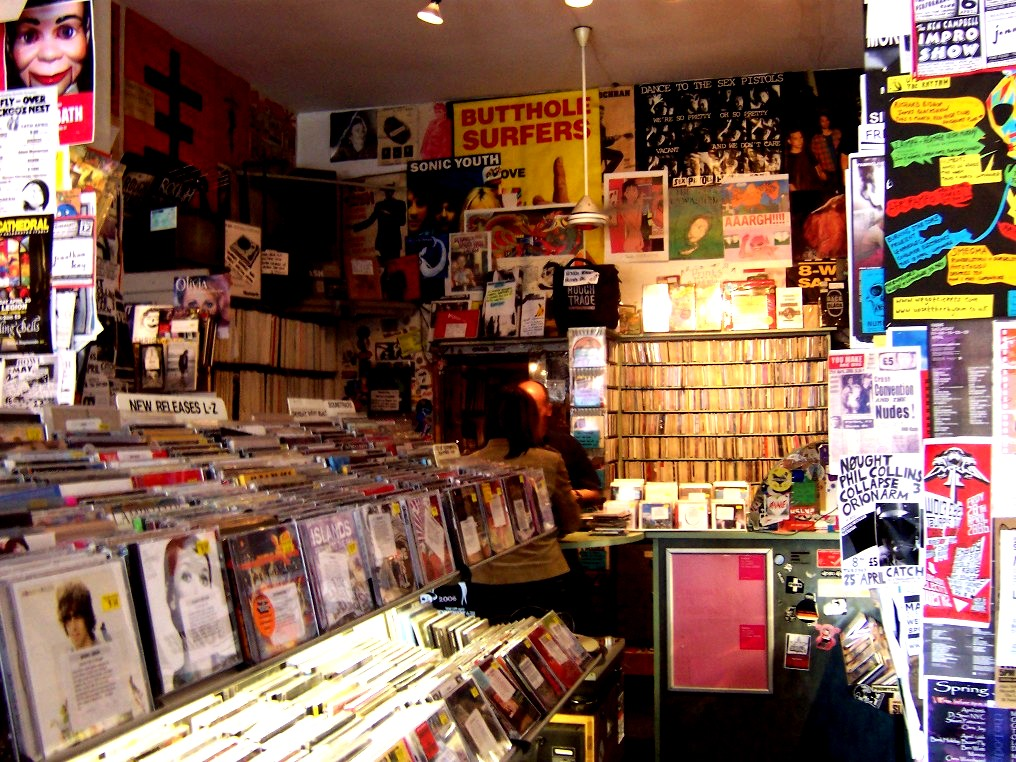
Music retailers Rough Trade are one of almost 100 records stores that submit sales details for the Official Record Store Chart.

The Official Record Store Chart is a weekly music chart based on physical sales of albums in almost 100 independent record stores in the United Kingdom, such as Rough Trade, Rounder Records, Jumbo and Sound It Out. It is compiled by the Official Charts Company (OCC), and each week's number one is first announced on Friday evenings on the OCC's official website.

The chart's launch was first announced by the OCC on 17 April 2012 – at the time, British record stores were selling 4.5 million albums per year, and were contributing towards 95 per cent of the country's total vinyl sales. However, music downloads held a considerable share of the albums market, leading to a decline in the number of outlets. In promoting the chart, Martin Talbot, managing director of the OCC, remarked that he could see the benefits to both digital and physical album sales, but that there was "nothing nicer than the smell and feel of a nice chunky vinyl".

The Official Record Store Chart was first broadcast by British DJ Steve Lamacq on his eponymous radio programme on BBC 6 Music; the first number one was Boys & Girls, the debut studio album by American band Alabama Shakes. Geoff Travis, founder of Rough Trade, the label that distributed Boys & Girls, stated that he was "very proud" that his label had achieved this feat.

The first Official Record Store Chart was announced on Friday 20 April 2012, five days later than normal, to coincide with the eve of the UK's fourth annual Record Store Day, an international initiative founded to encourage purchases at record shops. Talbot explained that the purpose of the chart was to "help spread the Record Store Day word throughout the year".

The current number one Record Store Chart album is This is How Happiness Feels? by Reverend & the Makers, of the week ending 21 May 2026.

== Best-selling albums in record stores by year ==
| Year | Album | Artist | Record label | Ref. |
|---|---|---|---|---|
| 2012 | Babel | Mumford & Sons | Gentlemen of the Road/Island | |
| 2013 | AM | Arctic Monkeys | Domino | |
| 2014 | X | Ed Sheeran | Asylum | |
| 2015 | 25 | Adele | XL | |
| 2016 | Blackstar | David Bowie | RCA | |
| 2017 | ÷ | Ed Sheeran | Asylum | |
| 2018 | Tranquility Base Hotel & Casino | Arctic Monkeys | Domino | |
| 2019 | Everything Not Saved Will Be Lost – Part 1 | Foals | Warner Bros | |
| 2020 | Ultra Mono | Idles | Partisan | |
| 2021 | Blue Weekend | Wolf Alice | Dirty Hit | |

== See also ==
- List of Official Record Store Chart number ones from the 2010s
- List of Official Record Store Chart number ones from the 2020s
