= Yak (band) =

English rock band

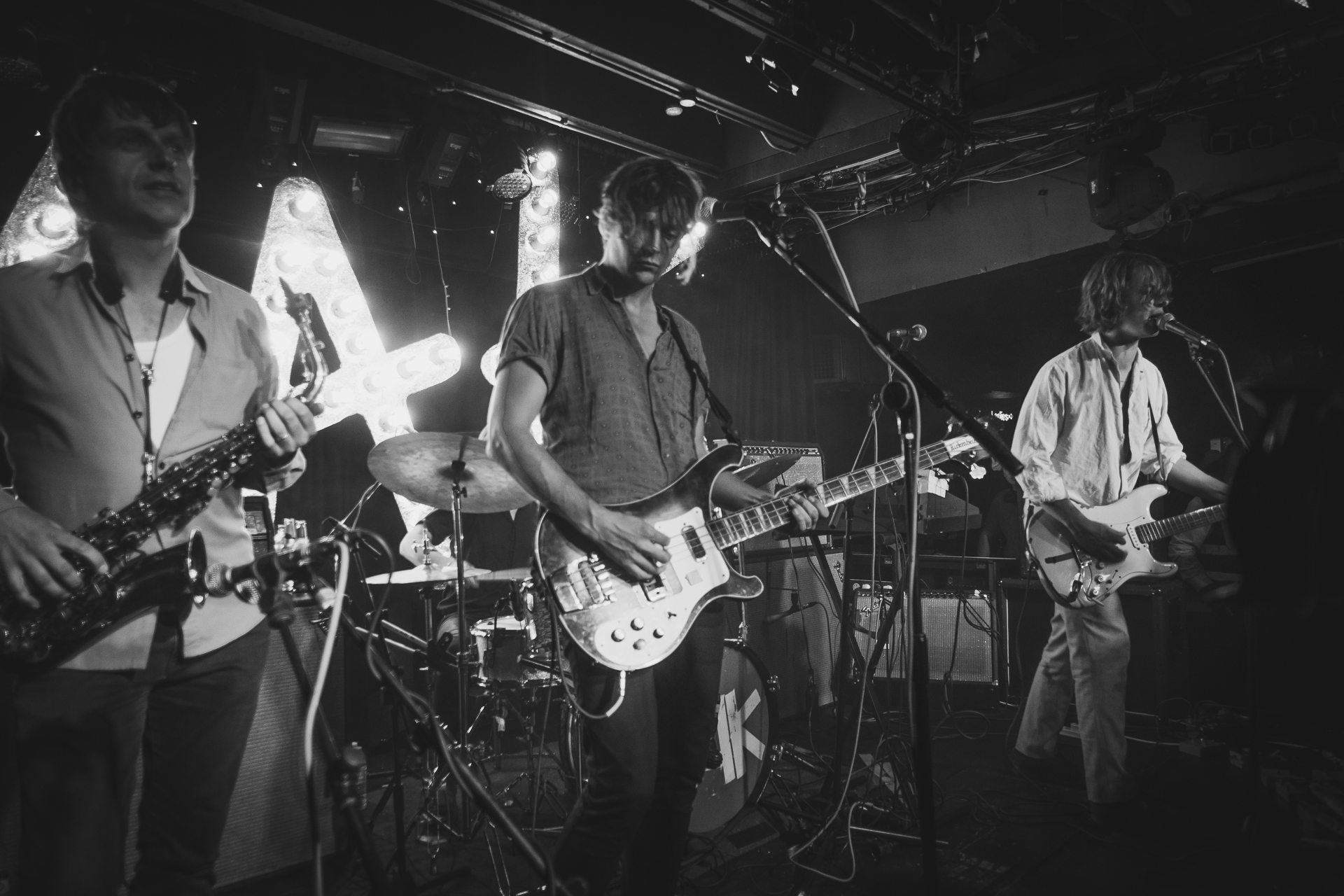
- Yak performing at Dingwalls on 24 May 2016

Background information
- Origin: Wolverhampton, England
- Genres: Alternative rock, psychedelic rock
- Years active: 2014–2019
- Labels: Octopus Electrical, Fat Possum Records, Third Man Records, Virgin EMI Records
- Spinoffs: INTL
- Spinoff of: Yelps
- Members: Oliver Henry Burslem; Vincent Davies; Elliot Rawson
- Past members: Andy Jones

Yak were an English alternative rock band, formed in 2014 and composed of singer-guitarist Oliver Henry Burslem, bassist Vincent Davies and drummer Elliot Rawson.

The band released their debut album Alas Salvation in May 2016. The band's original bassist Andy Jones left the band in early 2017, after previously bowing out of earlier live commitments. They released their second album Pursuit of Momentary Happiness in February 2019. They entered an indefinite hiatus following a final show at ULU, London on 15 November 2019.

== History ==
Childhood friends Burslem and Jones (who have known each other since the age of about 5) were previously members of Wolverhampton band Yelps, who released their debut single "P.E.O.P.L.E" in 2007 via 1965 Records and follow up single "Ramshackle Of A Rave" the following year on Union Mills Records. An EP "This Ain't No Mardi Gras" was released in Japan in late 2008 before the band split. Burslem and Jones went on to form INTL with future Splashh members Toto Vivian and Tom Beal. In 2013, Burslem toured the US with Peace temporarily replacing guitarist Douglas Castle.

The duo later met New Zealand-born drummer Elliot Rawson in London. Rawson had previous played with Auckland bands The Mud Babies and Popstrangers. He also worked as a DJ, remixer and producer, under the guise of Weapons.

The band uploaded the song Plastic People to their SoundCloud in November 2014 before releasing debut single Hungry Heart on Fat Possum Records in February 2015, both of which were recorded by Philip Brillo and Felix Rashman. They released follow up single Plastic People the following May, again on Fat Possum. In September 2015, the band released No via Third Man Records.

The band have toured extensively through 2015/16, which has included support tours with Peace, King Gizzard & the Lizard Wizard and The Last Shadow Puppets and shows at SXSW, Through early 2016, the band toured with bassist Andy Jones temporarily replaced by Gallon Drunk member Leo Kurunis as he had reportedly left the country to stay at a buddhist retreat. Kurunis also appeared in the promo video for Victorious (National Anthem)

The band released their debut album Alas Salvation in May 2016 on their own Octopus Electrical label. The album (except 'Smile' which was previously recorded with John Coxon of Spiritualized) were produced with former Pulp bassist Steve Mackey. It was received with positive critical review, gaining favourable reviews from publications such as Q Magazine, The Guardian, DIY Magazine and The 405. As with all previous releases, the debut album artwork featured work by influential London/Los Angeles based photographer and artist Nick Waplington.

The band spent the rest of 2016 touring - playing both festivals, including 2016 Glastonbury festival and Reeperbahn Festival, and headlining their own shows. The year was culminated with a UK tour, ending with a sold-out headline show at London's Scala venue. They were accompanied on stage on this tour with Saxophonist Martin Slattery.

The band released the digital-only double A-side single Heavens Above / Semi-Automatic in October 2016. Steve Mackey returned to the producing role on the new release.

In May 2017, the band resumed touring with Eric Weber (from the band Tempesst) temporarily filling in on bass and Kane Reynolds (also of Tempesst) on keys. In September 2017, it was revealed that Vincent Davies, previously of Hidden Charms was joining the band. In November 2017, Burslem confirmed that Jones left the band to get married and had re-located to Melbourne, Australia. In October 2017, the band released a cover of The Dixie Nightingales song All I Need Is Some Sunshine In My Life via Yala! Records. The single was recorded with Kevin Parker and Jay Watson of Tame Impala in Perth, Australia in early 2017 and features Jones on bass.

In 2018, the band signed to Virgin EMI Records and released the single White Male Carnivore on 28 August 2018. They released their second album Pursuit of Momentary Happiness on 8 February 2019.

The band are set to release an EP titled Atlas Complex on 1 November 2019. The tracks were recorded earlier in the Summer in London and at Jack White's Third Man Records in Nashville. Despite announcing the release of a new EP, Burlsem has taken to social media to suggest the band are to split following the November UK tour - in August he posted "dirty Landry (sic) is aired ..... wheels firmly buckled. enthusiasm dwindling ..... the occupants self evicting ....meltdown numero 453 gas mark 5 fan assessing" and in October that "the last gasp is coming. Book your tickets if you wanna see us. Gonna be good to see the back of this game.". The band revealed that their show at ULU, London was their last before entering an indefinite hiatus.

== Band members ==
- Oliver Henry Burslem – lead vocals, guitar, synthesizers, organ, piano
- Vincent Davies – bass, backing vocals
- Elliot Rawson – drums, backing vocals

Former members

- Andy Jones – bass, backing vocals

== Discography ==
=== Singles ===
- "Hungry Heart" (February 2015), Fat Possum Records
- "Plastic People" (May 2015), Fat Possum Records
- "No" (September 2015), Third Man Records
- "Harbour the feeling", Octopus Electrical
- "Heavens Above" (October 2016), Octopus Electrical
- "All I Need Is Some Sunshine In My Life" (October 2017), Yala! Records
- "White Male Carnivore" (August 2018), Virgin EMI

=== Albums ===
- Alas Salvation (May 2016), Octopus Electrical
- Pursuit of Momentary Happiness (February 2019), Third Man Records/Virgin EMI
