= Be Slowly =

Studio album by Jaws
- Released: 14 September 2014
- Recorded: 2013–2014
- Genre: Indie pop; Surf pop; Dream pop; Shoegazing
- Length: 41:55
- Label: SideOneDummy
- Producer: Dreamtrak

Jaws chronology
Milkshake (2013)	Be Slowly (2014)	Simplicity (2016)

Singles from Be Slowly
- 1. "Gold" Released: 28 July 2013; 2. "Think Too Much, Feel Too Little" Released: 6 March 2014; 3. "Be Slowly" Released: 23 June 2014; 4. "Swim" Released: 25 August 2014

Be Slowly is the debut studio album by British pop band Jaws.

The album was released on 14 September 2014 through SideOneDummy and Rattlepop as a digital download.

== Background ==
On 27 May 2014, the band announced their debut album Be Slowly set for release on 15 September. The title song "Be Slowly" was recorded and produced by Oliver Horton AKA Dreamtrak (Swim Deep, Foals, Cymbals) That day they also uploaded the title track to SoundCloud, as well as making the album available for pre-order.

== Track listing ==
All lyrics are written by Connor Schofield

No.	Title	Length
1.	"Time"	3:44
2.	"Cameron"	4:14
3.	"Gold"	3:59
4.	"Swim"	3:37
5.	"Home"	3:51
6.	"Be Slowly"	2:43
7.	"Think Too Much, Feel Too Little"	3:09
8.	"Filth"	4:01
9.	"Sunset State"	4:15
10.	"Surround You"	4:32
11.	"NYE"	3:51
Total length:		41:56

== Charts ==
Chart performance for Be Slowly
Chart (2014)	Peak position
UK Albums (OCC)	73
