= Geoma Records =

- Founded: 2013
- Founder: George David
- Distributor: Republic Of Music / Universal
- Genre: Pop, Dance
- Country of origin: United Kingdom
- Location: Surrey, England
- Official website: geomamedia.com

Geoma Records is an English independent record label which was founded by George David Madgwick in 2013.

== History ==
Geoma Records was founded in Spring 2013 as a label name for a social media based dance release for the song "Feel My Rhythm" by Viralites. The single, released digitally only, peaked in the UK Singles Chart at No. 92. The single only had 24 hours of only social media promotion to generate all the sales secured. Shortly after, they were invited to work with another label where they were responsible for the management of a new boyband known as M.A.D. M.A.D managed to secure a No. 37 chart position with their debut release "Toyboy" after just 10 weeks together as band. Further on, the label released a follow-up single called "Fame & TV" which peaked at No. 32 in the UK chart, and hit No. 26 in the Scottish Singles Chart.

In spring 2014, Geoma, agreed on a deal with Kobalt Label Services to fulfil their worldwide digital distribution and partner with their current physical distributor Cargo Records. After 2015, off from releasing records Geoma signed a new distribution deal with Republic of Music / Universal for worldwide distribution. In 2016, they planned releases with artists such as Mikey Bromley, Dylan Evans and Joey Devries. Geoma has also extended their arm to producing compilation albums.

== Artists ==
- Mikey Bromley
- Dylan Evans
- Joey Devries
- The Bachelors - 1950s/1960s group
- M.A.D
- Nathan Grisdale - One song distribution only
- Viralites

== Notable recordings ==
=== Albums ===
- M.A.D - M.A.D (Geoma Records, 2014) UK No. 36
- Mikey Bromley - This One's For You (Geoma Records, 2016) UK No. 43

=== Singles ===
Top 100 Singles

- Viralites - "Feel My Rhythm" (Geoma Records, 2013) UK No. 92
- M.A.D ft. Kobe Onyame - "Toyboy" (Geoma Records, 2013) UK No. 37
- M.A.D - "Fame & TV" (Geoma Records, 2014) UK No. 32
- M.A.D - "Shotgun" (Geoma Records, 2014) UK No. 30
- Nathan Grisdale - "Only One" (Boxx Records / Geoma Records, 2015) UK No. 67
- Only The Young - "I Do" (The QWorkz / Geoma Records, 2015) UK No. 53
- Only The Young - "I Do" (Geoma Records, 2015) Ireland No. 41
- Mr Meanor - "Here With You" (Geoma Records, 2015) UK No. 41
- Beardman - “Beard on my Face” (Geoma Records, 2024) UK Sales No. 2

== See also ==
- List of record labels: A–H
