= Sugarthief =

SUGARTHIEF
- Origin: Penkridge, England
- Genre: indie rock
- Years active: 2015-present

Sugarthief are an Indie-rock band from Penkridge, Staffordshire in England. The four-piece band consists of Jack and Jordi James (brothers), and school friends Luke Owen and Reece Downton. The band formed in the summer of 2015, and began with Jack and Jordi as a duo before Reece and Luke joined. Jordi is the lead singer of the band, and also plays guitar and bass, whilst his brother Jack is the lead guitarist and backing vocals. Reece plays drums and Luke is the bassist. Many of their songs focus on the issues of small-town life.

== Discography ==
=== Singles ===
- New Ends (2016)
- Crowing Youth (2016)
- Joy Affair (2016)
- Provide (2017)
- When Did It All Go So Wrong? (2017)
- Good Luck I Hope You Make It (2018)
- Modern Man (2019)

=== EPs ===
- I Before E(P) (2019)
