= Boytoy (band) =

American rock band

- Origin: Brooklyn, New York City, New York, United States
- Genres: Indie rock, garage rock, post-punk revival
- Years active: 2012–present
- Label: PaperCup Music
- Members: Saara Untracht-Oakner; Glenn Van Dyke; Dylan Ramsey; Matty Beans; Chase Noelle; Lena Simon

Boytoy is an American rock band from Brooklyn, New York City. It was formed in 2012 by Saara Untracht-Oakner and Glenn Van Dyke. They have been assisted by various others over the years. The band has released a self-titled Extended play, two studio albums, and several standalone singles.

== History ==
Boytoy was formed by Saara Untracht-Oakner and Glenn Van Dyke in 2012 after the breakup of their previous bands, You Can Be A Wesley and Beast Make Bomb, respectively. According to the band, the project developed after an impromptu late-night jam session, after which the pair decided to continue writing and performing together. They were later joined by Dylan Ramsey. While Untracht-Oakner and Van Dyke were on vocals and guitar, Ramsey was on the drums. The band signed with PaperCup Music. The band's first single, Visits, was recorded at Converse Rubber Tracks in Brooklyn and released in 2013.

The band released its first self-titled Extended play with the premiere of its first track, Shallow Town, in February 2014. It subsequently released the tracks Runner in May 2014 and Blazed in September 2014. While Ramsey performed on the band's early recordings, Matthew Gregory Aidala (known professionally as Matty Beans) replaced Ramsey before the recording of the band's first full-length album, Grackle. The album released on 2 October 2015 through PaperCup Music, and consisted of 11 tracks. The band later released the singles Mary Anne and Static Age. The band recorded its second album, Night Leaf, with producer Kyle Mullarky at Topanga Canyon. For the album, Untracht-Oakner and Van Dyke were joined by Chase Noelle as the band's drummer, while Lena Simon contributed bass, keyboards and backing vocals during the recording sessions. The album was released on 27 April 2018.

Boytoy has been described as a queer band. The band has performed at various music festivals such as CMJ Music Marathon, Northside Festival, SXSW, CBGB Festival, and Gigawatts Festival, and toured across Europe and the United States.

== Discography ==
=== Studio albums ===
- Grackle (2015)
- Night Leaf (2018)

=== Extended plays ===
- Boytoy (2014)

=== Singles ===
- Visits (2013)
- Runner (2014)
- Blazed (2014)
- Mary Anne (2018)
- Static Age (2018)
