= Simplicity (Jaws album) =

Studio album by Jaws
- Released: 4 November 2016
- Recorded: 2015–2016
- Genre: Post-punk; grunge; dream pop; psychedelic rock; garage rock; shoegazing
- Length: 42:53

Jaws chronology
Be Slowly (2014)	Simplicity (2016)	The Ceiling (2019)

Singles from Simplicity
- 1. "What We Haven't Got Yet" Released: 23 September 2015; 2. "Right In Front of Me" Released: 7 September 2016; 3. "Work It Out" Released: 6 October 2016; 4. "Just a Boy" Released: 27 October 2016

Simplicity is the second studio album by British indie rock band Jaws. The album was self-released on 4 November 2016.

== Track listing ==
All lyrics are written by Connor Schofield, Alex Hudson, and Eddy Geach; all music is composed by Jaws.

No.	Title	Length
1.	"Just a Boy"	4:12
2.	"What We Haven't Got Yet"	3:13
3.	"Right in Front of Me"	3:54
4.	"17"	4:48
5.	"Cast"	3:35
6.	"Interlude"	2:52
7.	"On the Sunshine"	4:12
8.	"Work It Out"	4:21
9.	"In the Morning"	3:36
10.	"A Brief Escape from Life"	3:32
11.	"The Invisible Sleep"	4:38
Total length:		42:53

== Critical reception ==
Professional ratings
Review scores
Source	Rating
DIY	4/5 stars
Dork	4/5 stars
GIGsoup	79/100
Read Junk	4.5/5 stars

Simplicity received positive reviews from contemporary music critics, including from DIY, Dork, GIGsoup and Read Junk.

== Personnel ==
- Connor Schofield – vocals, rhythm guitar
- Alex Hudson – lead guitar
- Eddy Geach – drums
