= Dutch Uncles =

English indie pop band

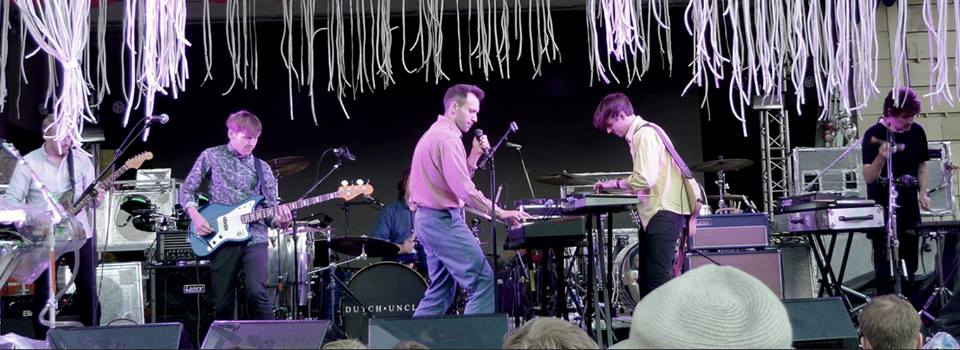
- Dutch Uncles performing at Edinburgh Castle, August 2015

Background information
- Origin: Marple, Stockport, England
- Genres: Indie pop; math rock; new prog; art rock
- Years active: 2008–present
- Labels: Tapete Records (GER); Love and Disaster (UK); Memphis Industries (UK)
- Members: Duncan Wallis; Peter Broadhead; Robin Richards; Andy Proudfoot; Neil Wright; Henry Broadhead
- Past members: Daniel Spedding
- Website: dutchuncles.co.uk

Dutch Uncles are an English indie pop band from Marple, England. They are known for their use of atypical time signatures within a pop context, and the androgynous vocals of frontman Duncan Wallis.

== Biography ==
Originally from Marple, the band started playing together in college. Early influences included Talking Heads, XTC, The Smiths, Field Music, Tears for Fears, King Crimson, Kate Bush and Steve Reich. Originally known as Headlines, they became Dutch Uncles in April 2008, and in early 2009 released their self-titled debut album in Germany with Tapete Records, recorded at Cloud Hill Studios in Hamburg. Reviewing the album, NME commented that "their scratchy post-punk racket effectively draws a line between the first Futureheads album and Vampire Weekend. On the likes of 'I Owe Someone For Everything' frontman Duncan Paton’s (sic) idiosyncratic yelping can be a bit annoying, but when they stop trying too hard, as on 'Twelfth', the results are quite pleasing."

The band emerged as part of a new wave of Manchester-area bands. (Duncan Wallis: "We all sort of came to light at the same time thanks to our manager’s EP that he’d released on his Love & Disaster label featuring us, Delphic, and Everything Everything, and I think that back in 2010 it was very important to say “Manchester isn’t just lad rock,” because it was shortly after the demise of Oasis and it feels very different now.") The band toured with dananananaykroyd, Bombay Bicycle Club and The Futureheads in 2009 and 2010 and released their UK debut single "The Ink", through independent record label Love & Disaster on 31 May 2010. Soon after, they signed to London label Memphis Industries and released the single "Fragrant" on 1 November 2010. Dutch Uncles' second album, Cadenza, was released on 25 April 2011. They toured the UK throughout 2011 including appearances at Reading and Leeds Festivals and stage headline slots at Bestival and Latitude, followed by a European and UK support tour with Wild Beasts.

Their third album, Out of Touch In The Wild, was released on 14 January 2013. The band consciously expanded their sonic palette for this release, with Robin Richards later admitting to having composed more under the influence of Stravinsky and stating that "I didn't want any boundaries when it came to writing the new songs. With Cadenza, I was always writing music with the idea of us playing it live with two guitars, drums and bass and maybe some piano. With this album, I wrote whatever felt right for any other instruments, be it strings or tube percussion." Wallis revealed that the underlying theme of the record was addiction and addictive behaviour. "For the song "Nometo", I tried to imagine Leonard Cohen doing his thing - full of regret - then I started to think about the idea of addiction, and then it seemed that every song contained a person who was addicted to something or another. The next two songs that were written – "Threads" and "Flexxin" – were about auto-erotic asphyxiation and S&M, and people becoming addicted to those types of things."

The following summer the band supported American rock band Paramore on their European tour. Paramore guitarist Taylor York cited Dutch Uncles as an inspiration for their 2013 album.

The band released their fourth album, O Shudder, on 23 February 2015. This record took a more personal and mature turn in terms of content, with reflections on sexuality, employment and considerations of parenthood. Duncan Wallis noted that "I’d just be writing in my flat at home, looking at the woodchip wallpaper, and I’d repeatedly say to myself, ‘Don’t make it personal, don’t make it personal, don’t make it personal.’ But it couldn’t be stopped; it was always going to sound like an album about a character settling into domestic life. We’d all been in long-term relationships at that point, and we were all kind of settling down." He also referred to having wanted Dutch Uncles " to sound like a more mature band... to have more of a knowingness" and even to sound more like "Grace Jones backed by Talking Heads" as well as describing the album as "an exploration into all different areas of doubt."

Following the release of the album, guitarist Daniel Spedding left the band, leaving them a four-piece. Adding keyboard player Henry Broadhead and guitarist Neil Wright to the live band, Dutch Uncles played their biggest headline shows to date at the Koko in London and The Ritz in Manchester in spring 2015. In autumn 2015, the band supported Garbage on the European leg of their 20 Years Queer anniversary tour.

In February 2017, the band released their fifth album, Big Balloon. Written and recorded as a reaction to its predecessor, the band developed the album with the intention of "simplifying the process" and of including more political content, although conversely also admitting to having worked under progressive rock influences including Gentle Giant, Focus and early King Crimson. The release coincided with a 12-date UK tour and an appearance at the BBC Radio 6 Music Festival. They made their first appearance at the Glastonbury Festival in June 2017.

In March 2023, Dutch Uncles released True Entertainment, their first studio album release in over six years. They marked their return with a UK tour and several festival appearances, including a headline show at Manchester International Festival 2023.

== Members ==
- Pete Broadhead – Guitar, marimba (2008–present)
- Andy Proudfoot – Drums (2008–present)
- Robin Richards – Bass guitar (2008–present)
- Duncan Wallis – Lead vocals, piano (2008–present)
- Henry Broadhead – Synthesisers, percussion (2015–present)
- Neil Wright – Guitar (2015–present)

=== Former members ===
- Daniel Spedding – Guitar (2008–2015)

== Podcast: Chips of Chorlton ==
In 2018, Dutch Uncles launched their own podcast series titled Chips of Chorlton, hosted by guitarist Neil Wright. The series combines discussions of the band’s own activities and the broader independent-music scene with light-hearted reviews of local chip shops, reflecting the group’s Manchester roots. Over 30 episodes have been released, available via platforms such as Apple Podcasts, Spotify, and AudioBoom.

Notable guests interviewed on the podcast include:

- Butch Vig, discussing topics such as chips in L.A., Garbage, Smashing Pumpkins, and Nirvana.
- Jonathan Higgs of Everything Everything.
- Mike Joyce, drummer of The Smiths.

The band have performed the podcast live, including a show at the Bluedot Festival.

== Robin Richards’ solo work ==
In September 2025, bassist and composer Robin Richards released his debut solo album, Taproots, on PRAH Recordings. The record features contributions from musicians including Chris Illingworth of GoGo Penguin, Ellen Beth Abdi, and producer Brendan Williams.

== Discography ==
=== Studio albums ===
Dutch Uncles - Cadenza album cover

Title	Record label	Release date	UK Albums Chart position	Official Record Store Chart
Dutch Uncles	Tapete Records	16 February 2009	—	—
Cadenza	Memphis Industries	25 April 2011	174	—
Out of Touch in the Wild	Memphis Industries	14 January 2013	84	1
O Shudder	Memphis Industries	23 February 2015	92	3
Big Balloon	Memphis Industries	17 February 2017	82	7
True Entertainment	Memphis Industries	10 March 2023	—	32
Polygon Hotel	Memphis Industries	19 February 2027	TBC	TBC

=== EPs ===
Title	Record label	Release date
Cadenza B-Sides	Memphis Industries	21 June 2011
Godboy EP	Memphis Industries	17 January 2013
Bellio EP	Memphis Industries	29 April 2013
No Hooks ltd edition cassette	Memphis Industries	9 December 2023

=== Singles ===
Title	Record label	Release date	Album	UK Physical Singles Chart
"Face In"	Tapete Records	December 2008	Dutch Uncles	—
"Steadycam"	Tapete Records	March 2009	Dutch Uncles	—
"OCDUC"	Love & Disaster	January 2010	Cadenza	—
"The Ink"	Love & Disaster	May 2010	Cadenza	—
"Fragrant"	Memphis Industries	November 2010	Cadenza	—
"Face In" (re-release)	Memphis Industries	February 2011	—	—
"Cadenza"	Memphis Industries	May 2011	Cadenza	—
"X-O"	Memphis Industries	July 2011	Cadenza	—
"The Ink" (re-release)	Memphis Industries	September 2011	Cadenza	—
"Fester"	Memphis Industries	November 2012	Out of Touch in the Wild	51
"Flexxin"	Memphis Industries	January 2013	Out of Touch in the Wild	—
"Slave to the Atypical Rhythm" (RSD release)	Memphis Industries	April 2013	—	83
"Bellio"	Memphis Industries	May 2013	Out of Touch in the Wild	—
"Nometo"	Memphis Industries	September 2013	Out of Touch in the Wild	—
"In n Out"	Memphis Industries	December 2014	O Shudder	—
"Decided Knowledge"	Memphis Industries	March 2015	O Shudder	—
"Upsilon"	Memphis Industries	May 2015	O Shudder	—
"Big Balloon"	Memphis Industries	January 2017	Big Balloon	—
"Oh Yeah"	Memphis Industries	February 2017	Big Balloon	—
"Streetlight"	Memphis Industries	June 2017	Big Balloon	—
"True Entertainment"	Memphis Industries	October 2022	True Entertainment	—
"Poppin'"	Memphis Industries	December 2022	True Entertainment	—
"Tropigala (2 to 5)"	Memphis Industries	January 2023	True Entertainment	—
"Damascenes"	Memphis Industries	April 2023	True Entertainment	—
"At the Wheel"	Memphis Industries	December 2023	—	—
"No Note"	Memphis Industries	November 2026	Polygon Hotel	—
