= In Love (Peace album) =

Studio album by Peace
- Released: 25 March 2013
- Recorded: November 2012; Chapel Studios, Lincolnshire; SARM Studios; Strongroom Studios; London, United Kingdom
- Genre: Indie rock, alternative rock, funk rock, psychedelic rock
- Length: 35:39
- Label: Columbia
- Producer: Jim Abbiss

Peace chronology
EP Delicious (2012)	In Love (2013)	Happy People (2015)

Singles from In Love
- 1. "Wraith" Released: 13 January 2013; 2. "Follow Baby" Released: 24 March 2013; 3. "California Daze" Released: 20 April 2013; 4. "Lovesick" Released: 16 June 2013

In Love is the debut album by British indie rock band Peace, released on 25 March 2013. The album was produced by Jim Abbiss.

== Reception ==
Professional ratings
Aggregate scores
Source	Rating
Metacritic	72/100
Review scores
Source	Rating
AllMusic	3.5/5 stars
The Guardian	2/5 stars
The Independent	3.5/5 stars
NME	9/10

The album has been met with generally positive reviews. NME gave In Love a 9 out of 10, with writer Eve Barlow claiming that the band are "as rejuvenating as a wash of zesty orange juice over a crushing hangover". The Independent gave the album 4 out of 5 stars, praising Koisser's "intriguing" songwriting that brought "an innovative eye to the age- old business of love through quirky images." Alexis Petridis of The Guardian was not as enthusiastic however, giving the album 2 out of 5 stars, but concluding "Whether there really is anything beyond that – or whether Peace's moment in the spotlight is as short-lived as that of the bands they bring to mind – remains to be seen."

== Track listing ==
All tracks are written by Harrison Koisser, Sam Koisser, Douglas Castle and Dominic Boyce, except where noted

No.	Title	Writer(s)	Length
1.	"Higher Than the Sun"		4:11
2.	"Follow Baby"		3:03
3.	"Lovesick"		2:13
4.	"Float Forever"		3:55
5.	"Wraith"	Harrison Koisser	3:16
6.	"Delicious"		3:08
7.	"Waste of Paint"		4:07
8.	"Toxic"		4:02
9.	"Sugarstone"		3:48
10.	"California Daze"		3:59
Total length:			35:39

Deluxe edition
No.	Title	Writer(s)	Length
1.	"Higher Than the Sun"		4:11
2.	"Follow Baby"		3:03
3.	"Lovesick"		2:13
4.	"Float Forever"		3:55
5.	"Wraith"	Harrison Koisser	3:16
6.	"Drain"		6:16
7.	"Delicious"		3:08
8.	"Waste of Paint"		4:07
9.	"Step a Lil' Closer"		3:24
10.	"Toxic"		4:02
11.	"Sugarstone"		3:48
12.	"California Daze"		3:59
13.	"Scumbag"		3:29
14.	"Bloodshake"		4:12

US version
No.	Title	Writer(s)	Length
1.	"Higher Than the Sun"		4:11
2.	"Follow Baby"		3:03
3.	"Lovesick"		2:13
4.	"Float Forever"		3:55
5.	"Wraith"	Harrison Koisser	3:16
6.	"Drain"		6:16
7.	"Delicious"		3:08
8.	"Waste of Paint"		4:07
9.	"Step a Lil' Closer"		3:24
10.	"Toxic"		4:02
11.	"Sugarstone"		3:48
12.	"California Daze"		3:59
13.	"Scumbag"		3:29
14.	"Bloodshake"		4:12
15.	"Flash"		3:52
16.	"White Noise"		4:55
17.	"1998 (Delicious) (Live at the Reading Festival)"		4:36
18.	"Follow Baby (Live at the Reading Festival)"		3:02
19.	"Wraith (Live at the Reading Festival)"		3:20

== Personnel ==
Peace

- Harrison Koisser – lead vocals, guitar
- Samuel Koisser – bass guitar, backing vocals
- Douglas Castle – lead guitar
- Dominic Boyce – drums, backing vocals

Technical personnel

- Jim Abbiss – production

== Charts ==
Chart (2013)	Peak position
UK Albums Chart	16
