= Binary Finary =

British trance music act

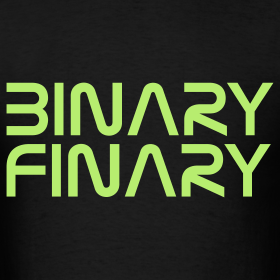

Background information
- Origin: Portsmouth, Hampshire, England
- Genres: Trance
- Years active: 1997–present
- Members: Matt Laws; Stuart Matheson
- Website: www.binary-finary.com

Binary Finary are a British trance act, originally comprising Matt Laws, Ricky Grant and Stuart Matheson. They are best known for the dance hit single "1998", especially for the Paul van Dyk and Gouryella remixes, which charted in many countries. The song was remixed numerous times under the title of the year the remix was produced ("1999" and "2000" etc.), many of which were popular. In the UK, "1998" reached a peak position of No. 24 on the UK Singles Chart whereas "1999" reached No. 11.

On 1 May 2006, they released a collection of 16 tracks written over their eight-year sabbatical under the general title, The Lost Tracks. This album is available only for download. Binary Finary are also featured in a Shiny Toy Guns song, "When Did This Storm Begin?".

On New Year's Eve 2009, Binary Finary launched 'Binary Finary LIVE' which featured both original and remixed tracks. The launch venue was Sensation at the Etihad Stadium in Melbourne. In 2009 Australian DJ Sasha Vatoff joined the group to tour as DJ and co-produce on new material. In 2018 Binary Finary released a 20th anniversary "modern update" of "1998", including remixes by Mark Sixma and Dosem.

In December 2024 it was announced on Facebook that Sasha Vatoff has left the group to pursue a solo career.

== Discography ==
=== Studio albums ===
- 2006 – The Lost Tracks

=== Singles ===
- 1997 – "1998" / "Zapya"
- 1998 – "1998" - UK No. 24
- 1998 – "Anthemic 1&2"
- 1999 – "1999" - UK No. 11
- 2000 – "2000" - UK No. 84
- 2001 – "Niterider" - UK No. 80
- 2005 – "Difference" (with Jose Amnesia pres. Cloudbreak)
- 2011 – "Isle of Lies" (with Daniel Wanrooy)
- 2011 – "Replode" (with Matthew Nagle)
- 2011 – "Freedom Seekers" (with Trent McDermott)
- 2011 – "Carbon Fibre" (with Rodrigo Deem)
- 2012 – "Smoking Gun" (with Genix)
- 2012 – "High Stress" (with Pulse & Sphere)
- 2012 – "Subliminal Delusions" (with Solange)
- 2012 – "Flight of Life"
- 2013 – "The Annex"
- 2013 – "Deception"
- 2013 – "Mainframe" (with Kris Maydak)
- 2013 – "Waiting for the Sun" (with Lele Troniq feat. Christina Novelli)
- 2013 – "Escherian" (with Alan Crown)
- 2013 – "Folded & Molded" (with Vegas Baby!)
- 2013 – "Tornado" (with Alpha Duo)
- 2014 – "Dark Side" (vs. Iversoon & Alex Daf)
- 2014 – "Symphony of Mystery" (feat. Chris Arnott)
- 2014 – "Psychosis" (with Dreamy)
- 2014 – "Forever Neon"
- 2014 – "DeLorean" (with Mino Safy)
- 2014 – "Trancelation" (with Frank Duffel)
- 2015 – "Annihilation" (with Alpha Duo)
- 2015 – "Rise" (with Harmonic Rush)
- 2015 – "Now Is the Time" (with KINETICA)
- 2015 – "One & Only" (vs. Allen & Envy feat. Radmila)
- 2015 – "Apollo Rising" (with Nicholson)
- 2015 – "Don't Hurt" (with Dreamy feat. Natalie Gioia)
- 2016 – "Believe in Everything" (with Talla 2XLC feat. Sylvia Tosun)
- 2016 – "The Vortex"
- 2016 – "We Are in Control"
- 2018 – "1998" (re-issue)
- 2019 – "In Our Blood" (with KINETICA feat. Audrey Gallagher)
- 2019 – "Syntax"
