= Pursuit of Momentary Happiness =

Studio album by Yak
- Released: 8 February 2019
- Studio: RAK Studios
- Genres: Garage rock, psychedelic rock
- Length: 41:24
- Labels: Third Man; Virgin EMI
- Producers: Marta Salogni, Oli Burslem, J. Spaceman

Yak chronology
Alas Salvation (2016)	Pursuit of Momentary Happiness (2019)

Singles from Pursuit of Momentary Happiness
- 1. "White Male Carnivore" Released: 29 August 2018; 2. "Bellyache" Released: 12 October 2018; 3. "Fried" Released: 6 December 2018; 4. "This House has No Living Room" Released: 25 January 2019

Professional ratings
Aggregate scores
Source	Rating
AnyDecentMusic?	7.1/10
Metacritic	74/100
Review scores
Source	Rating
AllMusic	3.5/5 stars
Clash	7/10
DIY	4/5 stars
Under the Radar	3.5/10
The Line of Best Fit	8/10
Pitchfork	7.6/10
The 405	7.5/10
NME	4/5 stars
Dork	3/5 stars

Pursuit of Momentary Happiness is the second studio album by English band Yak. It was released on 8 February 2019 through Third Man Records and Virgin EMI Records. The album was the band's first with bassist Vinny Davies after previous bassist Andy Jones moved to Australia.

== Background ==
Following the release of the band's debut album Atlas Salvation, the band found themselves facing multiple obstacles when it came to writing a follow-up. Front man Oli Burslem had originally planned to spend a month song-writing in Japan before meeting bassist Andy Jones who had recently moved to Australia. Burslem was approached by Tame Impala and Pond member Jay Watson to write and record a new record in Perth. However, he found himself spending all the album advance money on alcohol and not writing material, leading him to lose all his money and have to live in his van for a year and a half.

The band recruited bassist Vinny Davies and decided to start working on the album from scratch. Shortly after they would meet Spiritualized frontman Jason Pierce who encouraged the band to pursue creating the album as well as to "get loads of influences." Burslem wrote 29 songs for the album and used the songs that "had a consistent theme" for the album.

In August 2018 the band announced their signing to Virgin EMI alongside a UK tour and the single White Male Carnivore. The album was announced on 6 December 2018, alongside the release of the single "Fried."

== Music ==
The music of the album has been described as "psych-tinged" and "garage rock-informed." Bitter Sweet Symphonies.co.uk described the album as containing traces of later Beatles, Led Zeppelin, Roy Orbison, hardcore punk of the late ’80s, psychedelia of the late ’70s, and Leonard Cohen.

The first track on the album "Bellyache" was written while Burslem was living out of his car. He described the song as being "like the last piece of music we would ever make and that we had to put everything we had into it. That's where the last lyric "if you’re going for broke just make sure you don't choke" comes from." The song was compared to John Lennon at his rawest, "with the singer taunting some greedy fat cats reeling from their own gluttony."

The first single released from the album was the track "White Male Carnivore." The song was written while Burslem lived in Tokyo. Burslem decided to write a song from his point of view and said that "the three words which made me feel the most uncomfortable were white, male and carnivore. Everything currently seems reductive and polarising." The backing vocals in the track were compared to The Beach Boys.

The final song on the album "This House Has No Living Room" features Jason Pierce who adds vocals and slide guitar to the track as well as John Coxon who plays piano and harmonica.

== Track listing ==
All lyrics written by Yak, except where noted.

No.	Title	Length
1.	"Bellyache"	3:42
2.	"Fried"	3:22
3.	"Pursuit of Momentary Happiness"	3:24
4.	"Words Fail Me"	4:15
5.	"Blinded By the Lies" (Andrew Jones)	3:01
6.	"Interlude"	1:09
7.	"White Male Carnivore"	3:24
8.	"Pay Off vs. The Struggle"	4:03
9.	"Encore"	2:17
10.	"Layin' It on the Line"	4:20
11.	"This House Has No Living Room"	8:27
Total length:		41:24

== Personnel ==
Credits adapted from the album's liner notes.

Yak

- Oli Burslem – vocals, guitar, production
- Vincent Davies – bass guitar
- Elliot Rawson – drums

Additional performers

- J. Spaceman – piano & production on track 4, guitar on track 9, slide guitar & vocals on track 11
- John Coxon – guitar on track 9, piano & harmonica on track 11
- Elliott Arndt – flute on tracks 1 & 11
- Martin Slattery – saxophone on tracks 1, 4 to 6, 8, 10 & 11
- Nichol Thomson – trombone on tracks 1, 4, 6, 8 & 11
- Tom Walsh – trumpet on tracks 1, 4, 6, 8 & 11

Production

- Marta Salogni – production
- Claudius Mittendorfer – mixing
- John Davis – mastering engineer
- Ross Fortune – recording engineer

Artwork

- Jonny Lu Studio – art direction, sleeve design
- Nick Waplington – artwork, photography
