= Happy People (Peace album) =

Studio album by Peace
- Released: 9 February 2015
- Genre: Indie rock, post-Britpop, funk rock, alternative rock
- Length: 37:06
- Label: Columbia
- Producer: Jim Abbiss

Peace chronology
In Love (2013)	Happy People (2015)	Kindness Is the New Rock and Roll (2018)

Singles from Happy People
- 1. "Money" Released: 13 June 2014; 2. "Lost on Me" Released: 15 August 2014; 3. "I'm A Girl" Released: 8 February 2015; 4. "Gen Strange" Released: 22 April 2015

Happy People is the second studio album by British indie rock band Peace, released on 9 February 2015. Happy People was produced by Jim Abbiss and Duncan Mills.

== Reception ==
Professional ratings
Aggregate scores
Source	Rating
Metacritic	59/100
Review scores
Source	Rating
Drowned in Sound	(2/10)
The Guardian	2/5 stars
Music OMH	1/5 stars
NME	8/10
The Observer	2/5 stars
The Independent	5/5 stars
DIY	4/5 stars

Happy People received generally positive reviews upon release, gaining a score of 8/10 with NME, and 5/5 stars from The Independent, and positive reviews from Redbrick, who stated that "you'll still find yourself singing along to the hook hours after". However, The Guardian gave the album 2/5 stars, calling it "reheated baggy leftovers skilfully marketed at people who hadn't yet been born in 1990". Most reviewers have picked up on the clear 90s influences on the album, stating similarities between Peace and bands such as Oasis and Blur.

== Track listing ==
No.	Title	Length
1.	"O You"	3:47
2.	"Gen Strange"	3:15
3.	"Lost on Me"	3:44
4.	"Perfect Skin"	3:06
5.	"Happy People"	3:46
6.	"Someday"	3:22
7.	"Money"	3:10
8.	"I'm a Girl"	2:59
9.	"Under the Moon"	3:34
10.	"World Pleasure"	6:23
Total length:		37:06

Deluxe edition
No.	Title	Length
11.	"Love Me"	1:57
12.	"God's Gloves"	3:36
13.	"Imaginary"	4:13
14.	"Blue"	4:06
15.	"Saturday Girl"	2:51
16.	"Flirting USA"	3:43
17.	"Fur"	3:04
18.	"The Music Was to Blame"	3:49

== Personnel ==
Peace

- Harrison Koisser – vocals, guitar (all tracks) production (9, 15–17)
- Samuel Koisser – bass guitar (all tracks), background vocals (1–6, 8, 9, 11–15, 17, 18)
- Douglas Castle – guitar
- Dominic Boyce – drums (all tracks), background vocals (1–6, 8–15, 17, 18)

Additional musicians

- Liz Lawrence – background vocals (1, 9)
- Wired Strings (Note: Wired Strings consists of cellist and performance arranger Rosie Danvers, upright bassist Richard Pryce, cellist Jane Oliver, violists Bruce White and Emma Owens, and violinists Anna Croad, Debbie Widdup, Gillon Cameron, Hayley Pomfrett, Helen Hathorn, Jenny Sacha, Patrick Kiernan, and Sally Jackson.) – strings (1, 10)
- Keri Arrindell – background vocals (3, 7)

Technical

- Jim Abbiss – production (1–3, 5, 7, 10–14, 18)
- Dunca Mills – production (4, 6, 8)
- Mazen Murad – mastering
- Craig Silvey – mixing (1–3, 5, 7, 10–15, 18)
- Eduardo De La Paz Canel – mixing (4, 6, 8, 9), engineering assistance (1–3, 5, 7, 10–16, 18)
- Edd Hartwell – mixing (16, 17), engineering (1–3, 5, 7, 10–18)
- Nick Taylor – engineering (1, 10)
- Lee Slater – engineering (4)
