= Darren Porter =

Australian rugby league footballer

Personal information
- Full name: Darren Porter
- Born: 2 August 1972 (age 54)

Playing information
- Position: Prop
Club
Years	Team	Pld	T	G	FG	P
2001–04	Canberra Raiders	15	0	0	0	0
- Source: As of 25 January 2019

Darren Porter (born 2 August 1972) is an Australian former professional rugby league footballer who played for the Canberra Raiders in the National Rugby League.

== Playing career ==
Porter was 28 years and 304 days of age when he made his NRL debut for Canberra in the 2001 season, making him one of the oldest first-grade debutants in the modern era.

A forward, he made all of his 15 first-grade appearances off the interchange bench, from 2001 to 2004.
