= Out of Touch in the Wild =

Studio album by Dutch Uncles
- Released: 14 January 2013
- Genres: Indie rock, indie pop
- Length: 37:20
- Label: Memphis Industries

Dutch Uncles chronology
Cadenza (2011)	Out of Touch in the Wild (2013)	O Shudder (2015)

Professional ratings
Aggregate scores
Source	Rating
Metacritic	77/100
Review scores
Source	Rating
AllMusic	3.5/5 stars
Drowned in Sound	8/10
The Line of Best Fit	8/10
MusicOMH	4/5 stars
NME	8/10
No Ripcord	7/10
Pitchfork	7.3/10
This Is Fake DIY	8/10

Out of Touch in the Wild is the third studio album by English indie rock band Dutch Uncles. It was recorded over a two-week period in January 2012.

== Track listing ==
No.	Title	Length
1.	"Pondage"	2:13
2.	"Bellio"	2:47
3.	"Fester"	3:56
4.	"Godboy"	4:33
5.	"Threads"	3:31
6.	"Flexxin"	3:00
7.	"Zug Zwang"	4:56
8.	"Phaedra"	2:44
9.	"Nometo"	3:45
10.	"Brio"	5:55
