= M.A.D (band) =

British boyband

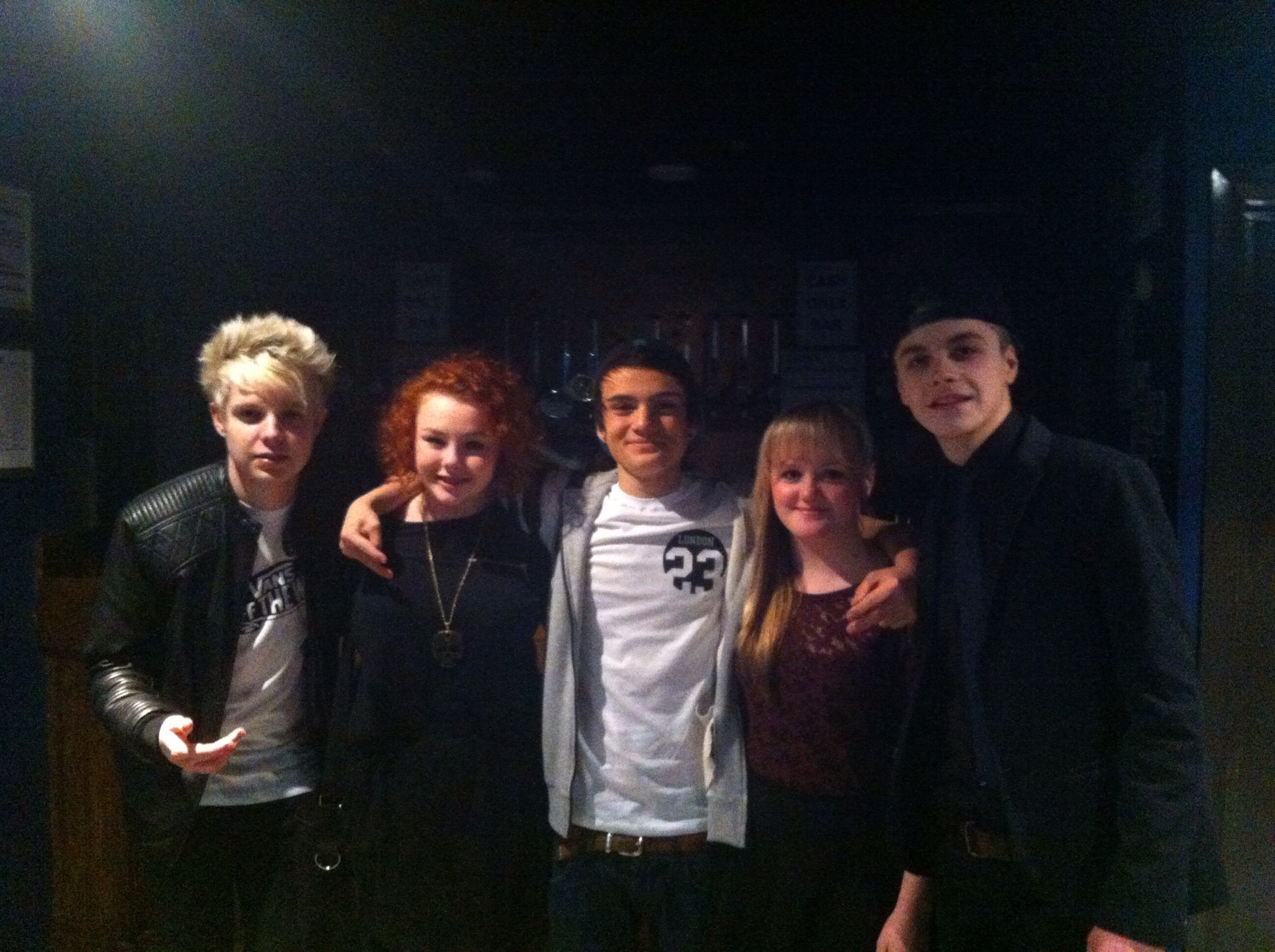
- M.A.D with fans in Birmingham

Background information
- Origin: London, England, United Kingdom
- Genre: Pop
- Years active: 2013–2014
- Label: Geoma
- Past members: Aiden Hancock (2013); Michael Sutthakorn (2013-2014); Dan Lewis (2013-2014); Ben Pryer (2013-2014)
- Website: www.officialmadband.com/

M.A.D were a British boyband consisting of Michael Sutthakorn, Dan Lewis and Ben "AB" Pryer. The band was originally formed in May 2013. George David of Geoma Media was appointed management. The original band included Aiden Hancock before Ben Pryer replaced him. Sutthakorn is from Northern Ireland, Pryer from London, and Lewis from Bryncethin, South Wales.

== Career ==
During early 2013, auditions were held in London in search of members for a new British Boyband. Lewis and Sutthakorn were both discovered through their own viral Facebook videos while Aiden Hancock was discovered on social networking site Twitter, before departing the band in early November.

Their debut single "Toyboy" was released in October 2013, the song peaked at number 37 on the UK Singles Chart, and number 4 on the UK Indie Chart. They were one of the first artists in the music industry to achieve an official UK top 40 position without any radio play, TV appearances or backing from a major label or investor, and they accomplished a position of 37 using social media and viral campaigns alone. M.A.D have now, ended.

Their second single "Fame & TV" was released in February 2014 and reached number a final chart position of 32 on the UK Singles Chart It was also number 4 on the UK Indie Chart. Their third single "Shotgun" was released on 25 May, with an album released in September. The official video for "Shotgun" was released on YouTube on 17 April, and reached around 279,000 views in a month, while the single gave the band their first top 30 hit.

The band completed their first headline UK tour in February 2014 to coincide with their second single "Fame and TV". The tour sold out across the UK, and an acoustic "Up Close and Personal" tour was confirmed for May.

The band announced they would be splitting in October 2014 and would be having a "Farewell Tour". The band split for various reasons. Ben Pryer (formally known as AB), went solo, picking up the solo career he had before the band. The other two band members, Dan Lewis and Michael Sutthakorn, made a duo called 'Park25', which split only weeks after it was formed. All of the boys are now continuing a solo career, but still remain good friends.

== Discography ==
=== Albums ===
Title	Album details	Peak chart positions
Title	Album details	UK
M.A.D	Released: 8 September 2014; Label: Geoma Records; Format: Digital, CD	36

=== Singles ===
Year	Title	Peak chart positions		Album
Year	Title	UK	UK Indie	Album
2013	"Toyboy"	37	4	M.A.D
2014	"Fame & TV"	32	4	M.A.D
2014	"Shotgun"	30	3	M.A.D
