= Peace (band) =

English indie rock band

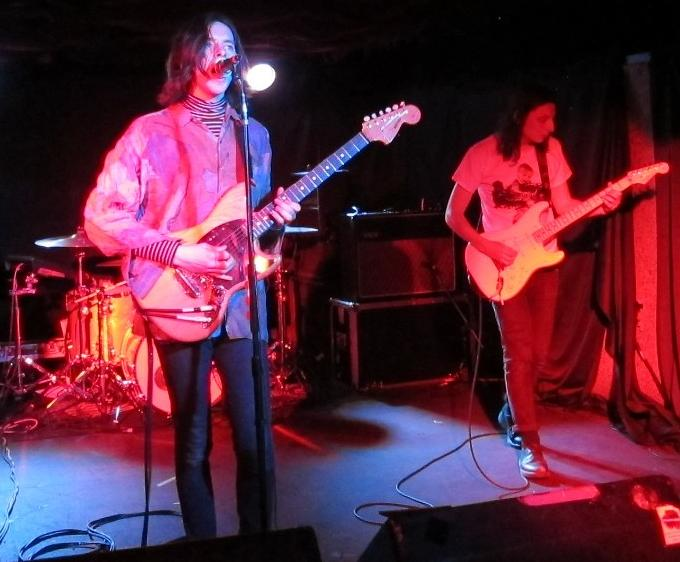
- Peace live in Denver, United States in 2013

Background information
- Origin: Worcester, England
- Genres: Indie rock; alternative rock; funk rock; psychedelic rock
- Years active: 2010 – present
- Labels: Columbia; Ignition
- Members: Harrison Koisser; Samuel Koisser
- Past members: Douglas Castle; Dominic Boyce
- Website: peaceforeverever.co.uk

Peace are an English indie rock band, formed in Worcester. The band currently consists of brothers Harry and Sam Koisser. The band began to receive critical acclaim in early 2012, from publications such as The Guardian and NME, who compared them to The Maccabees, Foals, Wu Lyf and Vampire Weekend. They were considered part of the B-Town movement, along with bands such as Swim Deep, Jaws and Superfood.

Their first single, "Follow Baby", was self-released in April 2012 in the form of 500 7" vinyl copies. The band then signed to Columbia Records & released their debut extended play, EP Delicious, on 7 September 2012. With their debut studio album, In Love, released on 25 March 2013, the band released their lead single "Wraith" on 13 January 2013. It was announced by the BBC on 9 December 2012 that Peace had been nominated for the Sound of 2013 poll.

The band is not to be confused with the zamrock band the Peace, that was active in the 1970s or the CCM band, Peace, led by Dan Peek during the 1990s.

== History ==
=== 2009–2011: Formation and beginnings ===
Originally named November and the Criminal, the band formed in August 2009 and released their self-titled debut EP in March 2010 before changing their name to Peace in October 2010. The band stated in 2013 they changed their name after having "written a whole different group of songs, which had a different feel" and dismissed their previous incarnation as November and The Criminal as being a "high-school band, when we were in college". During the band's last gig under their old name, they performed the first song written as Peace twice.

Lead singer Harry Koisser stated that the band was founded out of boredom, while the name Peace was inspired by a photograph celebrating the end of the Second World War.

In January 2012, Peace released their first track, "Bblood", online. Having attracted the attention of NME, the band were featured as part of the magazine's 2012 'Ones to Watch' feature, which praised them for "Doomy, gruff vocals laced with foreboding guitars that board on tropical (and sound about 10 times more exhilarating than you imagine that could be)". Peace were also well received by The Guardian, who hailed them as "the future of indie".

The band released their debut single "Follow Baby" in April 2012, which was limited to 500 7" vinyl copies, 200 of which were signed by the band members. Having supported Mystery Jets and The Vaccines on tour, Peace proceeded to release their debut extended play EP Delicious on 7 September. Well received by the BBC and NME, the four-track extended play featured "California Daze", a track made available as a free download by the band in August of that year.

=== 2012–2013: In Love ===
On 9 December 2012, the BBC announced that Peace had been nominated for the Sound of 2013 poll. The band released the lead single from their upcoming studio album "Wraith" on 13 January 2013, where it debuted at number seventy-five on the UK Singles Chart for the week ending 26 January 2013.

In February 2013, the band performed in an opening slot on the NME Awards Tour 2013 alongside Palma Violets, Miles Kane and headliners Django Django. "Follow Baby" was reissued as the second single from their debut album on 17 February 2013, failing to chart in the United Kingdom. In Love was released as the band's debut studio album on 25 March 2013 in the United Kingdom, debuting at number sixteen on the UK Albums Chart with sales of 9,028 copies for the chart week dated 6 April 2013.

=== Late 2013–2016: Happy People ===
In November 2013, Peace confirmed they had started recording for their second album. The band toured the US in October 2013 with Oliver Henry Burslem, who later formed and fronted Yak, temporarily replacing guitarist Douglas Castle. In late November and December 2013, playing at notable venues such as two nights at o2 Shepherd's Bush Empire, o2 Academy Birmingham, and Rock City (club) in Nottingham. During this November–December 2013 tour, Peace debuted future single 'Money'. The single received its first play on Hottest Record in the World on Radio 1 by Huw Stephens on 15 April 2014, with Peace announcing that it would be the first single from their upcoming second album and would be released 16 June 2014 and uploaded the music video for the song to their VEVO channel. The album date was scheduled for early February 2015.

On 30 July 2014, Peace announced the next single taken from their second album would be called "Lost On Me" and would be released on 28 September.

In August 2014, the band returned to the Reading and Leeds festivals, playing their largest shows to date. The band performed sixth on the bill for the main stage, playing before a number of popular artists including The Hives, Foster the People and the day's headliners Arctic Monkeys.

The second album, Happy People, was released on 9 February 2015.

=== 2017–2022: Kindness is the New Rock and Roll ===
On 8 December 2017, the band issued their first release for new label Ignition Records in the form of digital single "From Under Liquid Glass". The track was released in support of MQ Mental Health.

Their third album, Kindness Is the New Rock and Roll, was released on 4 May 2018.

In 2022, their 2013 single "Lovesick" appeared in the first episode of the British TV series, Heartstopper.

=== 2023: New band line-up and Utopia ===
On 3 April 2023, after a series of online teasers regarding their return in March 2023, Peace put their fourth album Utopia up in its entirety exclusively on their password protected website and performed several UK gigs in May and June 2023. It was also revealed that the band are now a duo, as founding members Douglas Castle and Dominic Boyce are no longer serving for the band.

== Members ==
- Harrison "Harry" Koisser – lead vocals, guitar, keyboards, piano, tambourine, drums
- Samuel "Sam" Koisser – bass guitar, backing vocals

== Former members ==
- Douglas "Doug" Castle – guitar
- Dominic "Dom" Boyce – drums, percussion, backing vocals

== Discography ==
=== Studio albums ===
List of studio albums, with selected details and chart positions
Title	Details	Peak chart positions
Title	Details	UK
In Love	Released: 25 March 2013; Label: Columbia; Format: LP, CD, digital download	16
Happy People	Released: 9 February 2015; Label: Columbia; Format: LP, CD, digital download	12
Kindness Is the New Rock and Roll	Released: 4 May 2018; Label: Ignition; Format: LP, CD, digital download	49
Utopia	Released: 10 October 2025; Label: Self-released; Format: LP, Digital download	—

=== Extended plays ===
List of EPs, with selected details
Title	Details
EP Delicious	Released: 7 September 2012; Label: Columbia; Format: Digital download

=== Singles ===
List of singles, with selected chart positions
Title	Year	Peak chart positions	Album
Title	Year	UK	Album
"Follow Baby"	2012	—	In Love
"Wraith"	2013	75	In Love
"California Daze"	2013	—	In Love
"Lovesick"	2013	—	In Love
"Money"	2014	66	Happy People
"Lost on Me"	2014	—	Happy People
"I'm a Girl"	2015	—	Happy People
"From Under Liquid Glass"	2017	—	Kindness Is the New Rock and Roll
"Power"	2018	—	Kindness Is the New Rock and Roll
"Happy Cars"	2023	—	Utopia
"Masterpiece"	2024	—	Utopia
"Swimming with Dolphins"	2025	—	Utopia
"Polly with the Perfect Hair"	2025	—	Utopia
"Darkness on the Dancefloor"	2025	—	Utopia
"Good Jeans"	2025	—	Utopia
"—" denotes single that did not chart or was not released in that territory.

== Tours ==
- Supertour (March–May 2012) (as headliner & support)
- Tour Delicious (October–December 2012) (as headliner)
- NME Awards Tour (February 2013) (as support)
- In Love Tour (April–May 2013) (as headliner)
- Gorge Tour (November–December 2013) (as headliner)
- May/June 2014 UK Tour
- So Long See You Tomorrow Tour (November–December 2014) (as support)
- J'adore tour 2015
- Happy People Tour 2015
- Kindness Is the New Rock and Roll Tour 2018

== Awards and nominations ==
Year	Organisation	Award	Work	Result
2012	NME	50 Best Tracks of 2012	"California Daze"	#13
2012	NME	50 Best Tracks of 2012	"Bloodshake"	#43
2012	NME	50 Best Tracks of 2012	"Follow Baby"	#47
2012	BBC	Sound of 2013	—N/a	Nominated
2013	NME	Best New Band	—N/a	Nominated
2014	NME	Best Album	In Love	Nominated
