= The Ceiling (album) =

Studio album by Jaws
- Released: 5 April 2019
- Recorded: Fall 2018
- Genres: Alternative dance; dream pop; grunge; shoegazing
- Length: 45:35
- Producer: Gethin Pearson

Jaws chronology
Simplicity (2016)	The Ceiling (2019)

Singles from The Ceiling
- 1. "Driving at Night" Released: 28 November 2018; 2. "Do You Remember?" Released: 30 January 2019; 3. "Fear" Released: 28 February 2019; 4. "Please Be Kind" Released: 26 March 2019

The Ceiling is the third and final studio album by British indie rock band Jaws. The album was self-released on 5 April 2019

== Background ==
The album was first announced the album in November 2018 coinciding with the release of their lead-off single, "Driving at Night". Then, the album was announced to be released on 9 April 2019, although that changed to 5 April at a later date.

On 30 January 2019, Jaws released the second single, "Do You Remember?" When describing the track, Connor Schofield said, "This song is a self observation of my social anxiety, and how I always compare ourselves to others when I should be working out how to be more comfortable in my own skin. Musically I think I’ve managed to merge my love for bands like The Cure and bands like Title Fight quite well on this one and its definitely one of my favourites on the record that I'm very much looking forward to playing live." Clash magazine described the track as "songwriting it nails that breezy '93 sound but adds a dense wall of noise, erring towards the Swervedriver wing of shoegaze".

The band's third single, "Fear" was released on 28 February 2019. In an interview with Dork Schofield said the track pushed the band out of their comfort zone. Schofield specifically said, "it was sort of the wake up call that we could take this record in any direction we want and still be confident with it. I think it might be my favourite song that we've ever put together, not only musically but for how it opened the door to write the rest of the record. The song is about fight or flight, trying to live via love rather than fear."

== Track listing ==
All lyrics are written by Connor Schofield, Alex Hudson, and Eddy Geach; all music is composed by Jaws.

No.	Title	Length
1.	"Driving at Night"	3:14
2.	"Feel"	4:27
3.	"Do You Remember?"	4:08
4.	"Fear"	5:12
5.	"End of the World"	5:20
6.	"Patience"	4:21
7.	"Looking / Passing"	5:13
8.	"The Ceiling"	4:49
9.	"Please Be Kind"	5:11
10.	"January"	3:40
Total length:		45:35

== Critical reception ==
Professional ratings
Review scores
Source	Rating
Dork	4/5 stars
Express & Star	9/10
Gigwise	8/10 stars
IINAG	5/5 stars
Soundblab	10/10

Johnny Edge writing for Gigwise gave The Ceiling eight stars out of ten. Edge praised the albums balance between grunge, indie pop, dance punk, and shoegazing. Specifically, Edge said The Ceiling "undulates between triumphantly dreamy, shimmering and eminently danceable near-pop – the bread and butter of the likes of current era Two Door Cinema Club, along with Friendly Fires, or even Delphic – and hazy, slower paced numbers. It shouldn't work, but absolutely does. ‘Do You Remember’ is perhaps the strongest example of this, with a grungy riff giving way to the clean, dreamy sound that has become such a JAWS staple."

Jamie Muir, writing for Dork, gave The Ceiling four stars out of five. Muir summarized the album as the band "writing the next chapter in their own manner, ‘The Ceiling’ is another sign that Jaws are a band you can never push into one lane - with a sound the band have been promising and pointing to since the very beginning."

== Personnel ==
- Connor Schofield – lead vocals, rhythm guitar
- Alex Hudson – lead guitar
- Eddy Geach – drums
