= Jaws (band) =

English indie rock band

JAWS
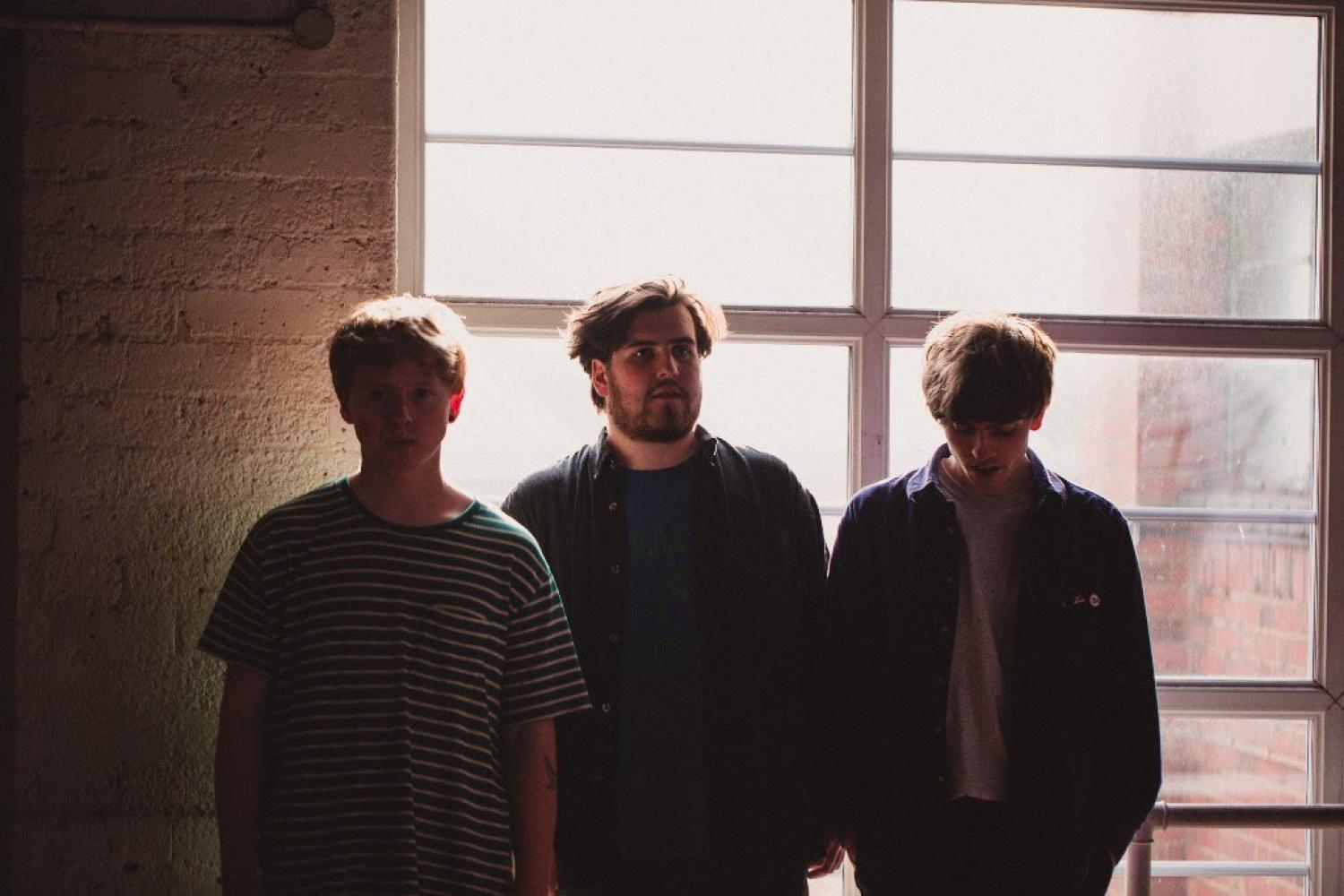

Background information
- Origin: Birmingham, England
- Genres: Dream pop; indie rock; grunge; nu gaze; shoegazing
- Years active: 2012–2025
- Label: Unsigned
- Past members: Jake Cooper; Connor Schofield; Alex Hudson; Eddy Geach; Leon Smith
- Website: Official Website

JAWS were an English indie rock band formed in Birmingham, England in 2012 after singer Connor Schofield had posted a demo (Cameron) online that received enough positive feedback to encourage him to start a band with friends from Halesowen College. They have often been identified as part of the Digbeth-based B-Town scene.

JAWS have published two EPs and three full length LPs so far. The B-side of "Surround You"—"Stay In" featuring on the Ubisoft game Rocksmith 2014. "Gold" was featured in an episode of Hollyoaks. They have toured with The Twang, Peace, Swim Deep, Spector as well as various support slots.

In December 2013, the band announced via their Facebook page that they would be recording a full studio album in 2014 partially funded by the PRS. In April, they released the single "Think Too Much, Feel Too Little".

In June 2014, the band announced their debut album "Be Slowly" would be released on 15 September that year. The band announced over Twitter a tour in September, stopping at Birmingham, Newcastle, Glasgow and plenty more, supported by Fickle Friends, Milk Teeth and Brawlers.

On 27 April 2015, JAWS shared the standalone single "Bad Company" via Huw Stephens Radio 1 show.

== History ==
=== Be Slowly (2014) ===
On 27 May 2014, the band announced their debut album Be Slowly set for release on 15 September. The title song "Be Slowly" was recorded & produced by Oliver Horton AKA Dreamtrak (Swim Deep, Foals, Cymbals) That day they also uploaded the title track to SoundCloud, as well as making the album available for pre-order.

=== Simplicity (2016) ===
On 23 September 2015, JAWS released the audio for "What We Haven't Got Yet" the first single from their new album. They then went on to release a music video for the song on 15 October 2015. They also released the audio and later a music video for the single "Right in Front of Me" as well as audio's for "Work It Out" and "Just A Boy" and a Music video for "Cast" which was released on 5 April 2017. The album was released on 4 November 2016.

The Ceiling, Final EP, and standalone singles (2019-2025)

On April 5th, 2019 the band released their third and final album “the ceiling” shortly after, they released their final EP “If it wasn’t for my friends things could be different” alongside several stand alone singles. Their final single “yours” was released on April 11th 2025 alongside 3 farewell shows. The band broke up immediately after.

== Discography ==
- Be Slowly (2014)
- Simplicity (2016)
- The Ceiling (2019)

== Band members ==
- Connor Schofield – lead vocals, rhythm guitar (2012–2025)
- Alex Hudson – lead guitar (2012–2025)
- Leon Smith – bass (2015 – 2025)
- Eddy Geach – drums (2012–2025)

Former Members:

- Jake Cooper – bass (2012–2015)
