= List of UK top-ten albums in 2018 =

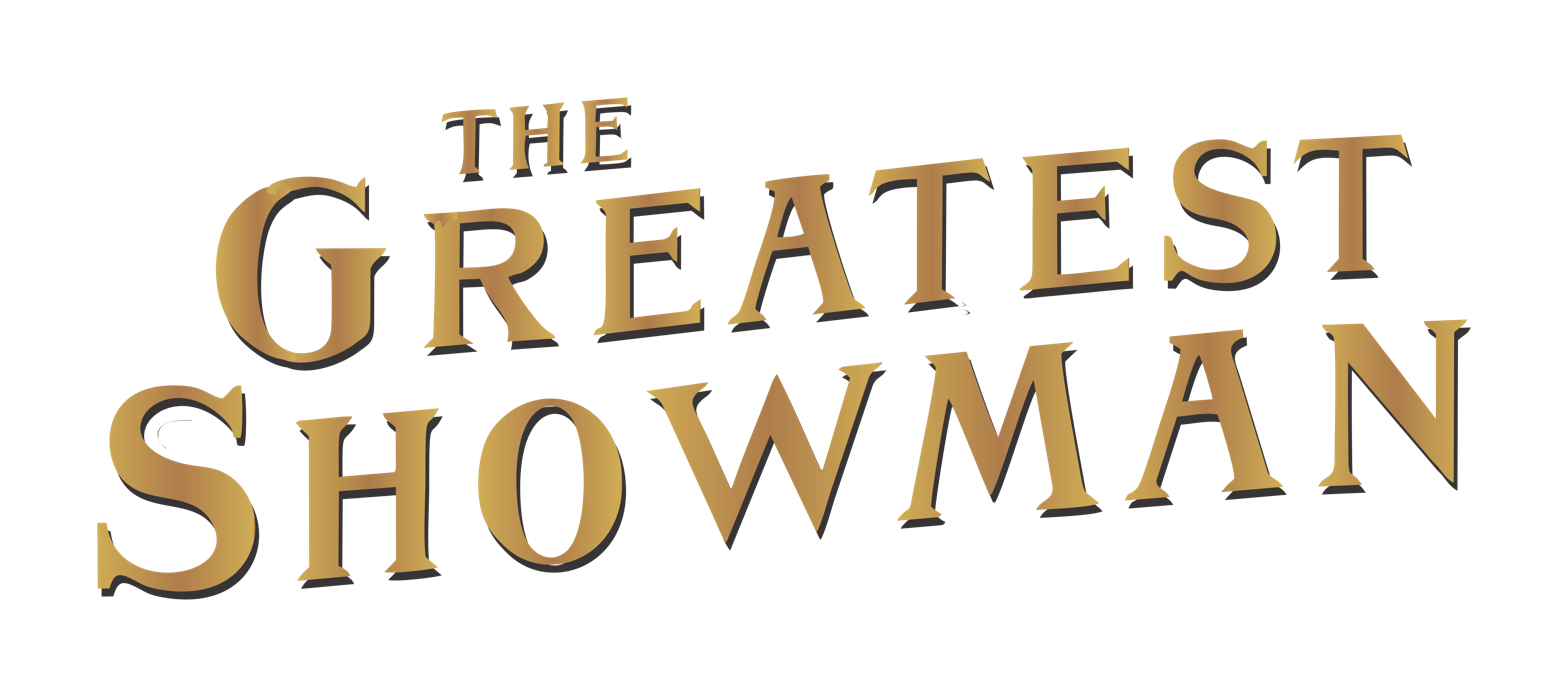
The soundtrack album of the movie The Greatest Showman dominated the charts in 2018, becoming the year's best-selling album.

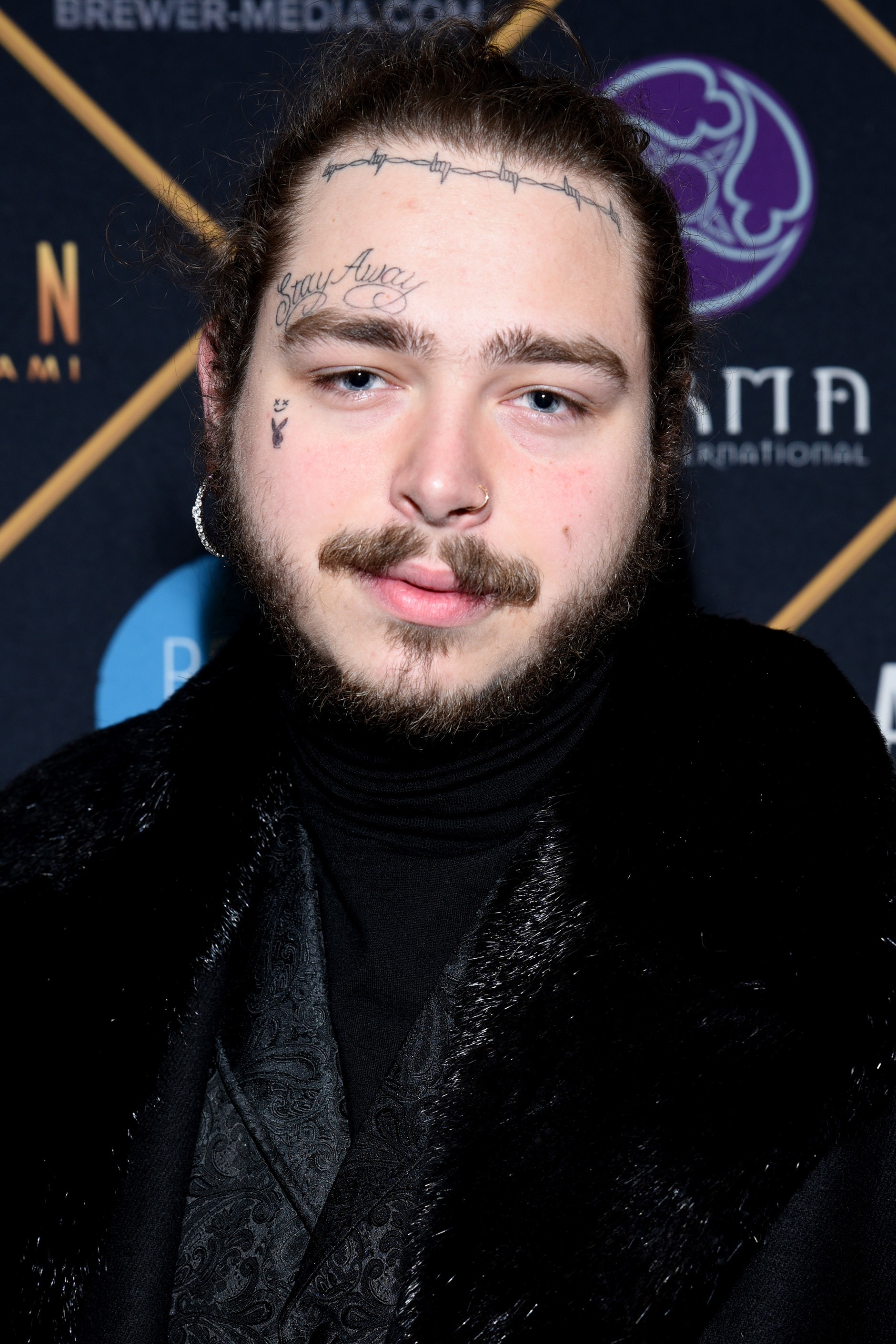
Rapper Post Malone reached number-one in May of this year with his second studio album Beerbongs & Bentleys, which spent a total of 15 non-consecutive weeks in the top 10. It went to become the sixth best selling album of the year.

The UK Albums Chart is one of many music charts compiled by the Official Charts Company that calculates the best-selling albums of the week in the United Kingdom. Since 2004 the chart has been based on the sales of both physical albums and digital downloads. Since 2015, the album chart has been based on both sales and streaming. This list shows albums that peaked in the Top 10 of the UK Albums Chart during 2018, as well as albums which peaked in 2017 and 2019 but were in the top 10 in 2018. The entry date is when the album appeared in the top 10 for the first time (week ending, as published by the Official Charts Company, which is six days after the chart is announced).

One-hundred and fifty-five albums were in the top ten this year. Thirteen albums from 2017 remained in the top 10 for several weeks at the beginning of the year, while 50 Years – Don't Stop by Fleetwood Mac and Unchained Melodies by Roy Orbison with the Royal Philharmonic Orchestra were both released in 2018 but did not reach their peak until 2019. Christmas by Michael Bublé was originally released in 2011, launched a new chart run in 2017, reaching a peak on its latest run in 2018 and again in 2019. Dua Lipa by Dua Lipa was the only album from 2017 to reach its peak in 2018. Twelve artists scored multiple entries in the top 10 in 2018. Anne-Marie, Calum Scott, First Aid Kit, The Greatest Showman Cast and XXXTentacion are among the many artists who achieved their first UK charting top 10 album in 2018.

Ed Sheeran's Divide returned to the top of the chart for the opening two weeks of the year, totalling twenty weeks at number-one since it was released in March 2017. The first new number-one album of the year was The Greatest Showman: Original Motion Picture Soundtrack by The Greatest Showman cast. Overall, nineteen different albums peaked at number-one in 2018, with nineteen unique artists hitting that position.

== Background ==
=== Multiple entries ===
One-hundred and fifty-five albums charted in the top 10 in 2018, with one-hundred and thirty-nine albums reaching their peak this year (including the re-entries Appetite for Destruction, Christmas, ABBA Gold: Greatest Hits, Mamma Mia! The Movie Soundtrack, Wanted on Voyage, The Beatles, X, which charted in previous years but reached peaks on their latest chart run).

Twelve artists scored multiple entries in the top 10 in 2018.

=== Chart debuts ===
Thirty-four artists achieved their first top 10 album in 2018 as a lead artist. The Mamma Mia! film cast had one other entry in their breakthrough year.

The following table (collapsed on desktop site) does not include acts who had previously charted as part of a group and secured their first top 10 solo album, or featured appearances on compilations or other artists recordings.

Artist	Number of top 10s	First entry	Chart position	Other entries
The Greatest Showman cast	1	The Greatest Showman: Original Motion Picture Soundtrack	1	—
First Aid Kit	1	Ruins	3	—
Migos	1	Culture II	4	—
Beth Hart	1	Black Coffee	7	—
Mist	1	Diamonds in the Dirt	4	—
Fredo	1	Tables Turn	5	—
The Temperance Movement	1	A Deeper Cut	6	—
Tory Lanez	1	Memories Don't Die	8	—
Calum Scott	1	Only Human	4	—
XXXTentacion	1	Question Mark	3	—
The Decemberists	1	"I'll Be Your Girl"	8	—
Fickle Friends	1	You Are Someone Else	9	—
Lissie	1	Castles	9	—
Kacey Musgraves	1	Golden Hour	6	—
Cardi B	1	Invasion of Privacy	5	—
Tom Misch	1	Geography	8	—
The Damned	1	Evil Spirits	7	—
Anne-Marie	1	Speak Your Mind	3	—
Janelle Monáe	1	Dirty Computer	8	—
Shinedown	1	Attention Attention	8	—
Jon Hopkins	1	Singularity	8	—
Ry Cooder	1	The Prodigal Son	10	—
BTS	1	Love Yourself: Tear	8	—
Courtney Barnett	1	Tell Me How You Really Feel	9	—
Ghost	1	Prequelle	10	—
Kids See Ghosts	1	Kids See Ghosts	7	—
The Carters	1	Everything Is Love	5	—
Tom Grennan	1	Lighting Matches	5	—
Mamma Mia! film cast	2	Mamma Mia! Here We Go Again: The Movie Soundtrack	1	Mamma Mia! The Movie Soundtrack (5)
Travis Scott	1	Astroworld	3	—
Miles Kane	1	Coup de Grace	8	—
Alice in Chains	1	Rainier Fog	9	—
IDLES	1	Joy as an Act of Resistance	5	—
Pale Waves	1	My Mind Makes Noises	8	—
Bradley Cooper	1	A Star Is Born	1	—

Notes

Camila Cabello's self-titled album Camila, was her first solo effort and her first top 10 album away from the group Fifth Harmony. She reached the top 10 with her bandmates when 7/27 peaked at number six in June 2016. The group had a second top 10 album in 2017 after Camila had left the lineup. Beth Hart collaborated with Joe Bonamassa on a first top 10 album together, Black Coffee. Bonamassa had reached the top ten with three albums previously, the best performing Driving Towards the Daylight making number two in 2012.

Three former members of UB40 - Ali Campbell, Terence Wilson (Astro) and Mickey Virtue - reunited in 2014 under the name UB40 featuring Ali, Astro & Mickey. Their 2018 album A Real Labour of Love was their first to reach the top 10. As a solo artist, Ali had recorded two top 10 albums to date - Big Love (number 6 in 1995) and Running Free (number 9 in 2007).

Rick Parfitt was part of the line-up of Status Quo, who had eighteen studio albums that reached the top 10. He achieved a posthumous top 10 album as a solo artist in 2018 with Over and Out. Sting, the long-standing member of The Police, and soloist Shaggy collaborated for the album 44/876, their first entry as a duo.

The Carters are husband and wife musicians Jay-Z and Beyoncé who have both achieved almost two decades of album chart success individually, the latter also as a member of the group Destiny's Child. However Everything Is Love marked their chart debut as a combined act.

=== Soundtracks ===
Soundtrack albums for various films entered the top 10 throughout the year. These included A Star Is Born, Bohemian Rhapsody, The Greatest Showman, Mamma Mia! and Mamma Mia! Here We Go Again.

=== Best-selling albums ===
The Greatest Showman cast had the best-selling album of the year with The Greatest Showman: Original Motion Picture Soundtrack. The album spent 87 weeks in the top 10 (52 this year, including 23 weeks at number one), recorded over 1.6 million combined sales and was certified 5× platinum by the BPI. Staying at Tamara's by George Ezra came in second place. Ed Sheeran's ÷, Mamma Mia! Here We Go Again: The Movie Soundtrack from the Mamma Mia! Here We Go Again Cast and Scorpion by Drake made up the top five. Albums by Post Malone, Bradley Cooper & Lady Gaga, Michael Bublé, Dua Lipa and Eminem were also in the top ten best-selling albums of the year.

== Top-ten albums ==
Key

Symbol	Meaning
‡	Album peaked in 2016 or 2017 but still in chart in 2018.
♦	Album released in 2017 or 2018 but peaked in 2019.
(#)	Year-end top ten album position and rank
Entered	The date that the album first appeared in the chart.
Peak	Highest position that the song reached in the UK Albums Chart.

Entered (week ending)	Weeks in top 10	Single	Artist	Peak	Peak reached (week ending)	Weeks at peak
Albums in 2016
1 December 2016	29	Glory Days ‡ ^{[A]}	Little Mix	1	1 December 2016	5
Albums in 2017
23 February 2017	44	Human ‡ ^{[B]}	Rag'n'Bone Man	1	23 February 2017	2
9 March 2017	7	Gang Signs & Prayer ‡ ^{[C]}	Stormzy	1	9 March 2017	1
16 March 2017	88	÷ ‡ (#3) ^{[D]}	Ed Sheeran	1	16 March 2017	20
15 June 2017	28	Dua Lipa ^{[E]} (#9)	Dua Lipa	3	1 March 2018	2
26 October 2017	19	Beautiful Trauma ‡ ^{[F]}	Pink	1	26 October 2017	1
9 November 2017	11	Together Again ‡	Michael Ball & Alfie Boe	1	9 November 2017	1
16 November 2017	21	The Thrill of It All ‡ ^{[G]}	Sam Smith	1	16 November 2017	2
16 November 2017	8	A Love So Beautiful ‡	Roy Orbison with the Royal Philharmonic Orchestra	2	16 November 2017	1
23 November 2017	5	Reputation ‡ ^{[H]}	Taylor Swift	1	23 November 2017	1
23 November 2017	3	Diamonds ‡ ^{[I]}	Elton John	5	23 November 2017	1
30 November 2017	8	The Architect ‡	Paloma Faith	1	30 November 2017	1
21 December 2017	6	Christmas ♦ ^{[J]}	Michael Bublé	5	3 January 2019	1
28 December 2017	10	Revival ‡	Eminem	1	28 December 2017	1
Albums in 2018
11 January 2018	88	The Greatest Showman (#1)	The Greatest Showman cast	1	18 January 2018	28
25 January 2018	6	Camila	Camila Cabello	2	25 January 2018	1
1 February 2018	1	Mania	Fall Out Boy	2	1 February 2018	1
1 February 2018	2	Ruins	First Aid Kit	3	1 February 2018	1
8 February 2018	1	The Time Is Now	Craig David	2	8 February 2018	1
8 February 2018	1	Culture II	Migos	4	8 February 2018	1
8 February 2018	1	Black Coffee	Beth Hart and Joe Bonamassa	7	8 February 2018	1
15 February 2018	4	Man of the Woods	Justin Timberlake	2	15 February 2018	1
15 February 2018	1	Walk Between Worlds	Simple Minds	4	15 February 2018	1
15 February 2018	1	Technology	Don Broco	5	15 February 2018	1
22 February 2018	1	Beautiful People Will Ruin Your Life	The Wombats	3	22 February 2018	1
22 February 2018	1	Diamond in the Dirt	Mist	4	22 February 2018	1
22 February 2018	1	Tables Turn	Fredo	5	22 February 2018	1
22 February 2018	1	Always Ascending	Franz Ferdinand	6	22 February 2018	1
1 March 2018	1	A Deeper Cut	The Temperance Movement	6	1 March 2018	1
8 March 2018	2	× ^{[K]}	Ed Sheeran	10	8 March 2018	2
15 March 2018	3	A Real Labour of Love	UB40 featuring Ali Campbell, Astro & Mickey	2	15 March 2018	1
15 March 2018	1	Love Is a Basic Need	Embrace	5	15 March 2018	1
15 March 2018	1	Memories Don't Die	Tory Lanez	8	15 March 2018	1
15 March 2018	1	All Nerve	The Breeders	9	15 March 2018	1
22 March 2018	2	Only Human	Calum Scott	4	22 March 2018	1
22 March 2018	1	Firepower	Judas Priest	5	22 March 2018	1
22 March 2018	1	Violence	Editors	6	22 March 2018	1
22 March 2018	1	Both Sides of the Sky	Jimi Hendrix	8	22 March 2018	1
29 March 2018	6	? ^{[L]}	XXXTentacion	3	29 March 2018	1
29 March 2018	1	In Your Own Sweet Time	The Fratellis	5	29 March 2018	1
29 March 2018	1	I'll Be Your Girl	The Decemberists	8	29 March 2018	1
29 March 2018	1	You Are Someone Else	Fickle Friends	9	29 March 2018	1
5 April 2018	65	Staying at Tamara's (#2) ^{[M]}	George Ezra	1	5 April 2018	1
5 April 2018	1	Over and Out	Rick Parfitt	4	5 April 2018	1
5 April 2018	1	Boarding House Reach	Jack White	5	5 April 2018	1
5 April 2018	2	Kidz Bop Summer '18	Kidz Bop Kids	8	5 April 2018	2
5 April 2018	1	Castles	Lissie	9	5 April 2018	1
12 April 2018	3	My Dear Melancholy (EP)	The Weeknd	3	12 April 2018	1
12 April 2018	1	Combat Sports	The Vaccines	4	12 April 2018	1
12 April 2018	1	Golden Hour	Kacey Musgraves	6	12 April 2018	1
12 April 2018	1	Wanted on Voyage ^{[N]}	George Ezra	10	12 April 2018	1
19 April 2018	4	Golden	Kylie Minogue	1	19 April 2018	1
19 April 2018	1	America	30 Seconds to Mars	4	19 April 2018	1
19 April 2018	1	St. Jude: Re:Wired	Courteeners	5	19 April 2018	1
19 April 2018	3	Invasion of Privacy	Cardi B	5	26 April 2018	1
19 April 2018	1	Geography	Tom Misch	8	19 April 2018	1
19 April 2018	1	The Deconstruction	Eels	10	19 April 2018	1
26 April 2018	1	Resistance Is Futile	Manic Street Preachers	2	26 April 2018	1
26 April 2018	1	Evil Spirits	The Damned	7	26 April 2018	1
3 May 2018	2	KOD	J. Cole	2	3 May 2018	1
3 May 2018	1	Accidentally on Purpose	The Shires	3	3 May 2018	1
3 May 2018	1	Crop Circle	Nines	5	3 May 2018	1
3 May 2018	1	Family Tree	Black Stone Cherry	7	3 May 2018	1
3 May 2018	1	44/876	Sting & Shaggy	9	3 May 2018	1
10 May 2018	15	Beerbongs & Bentleys (#6) ^{[O]}	Post Malone	1	10 May 2018	1
10 May 2018	7	Speak Your Mind ^{[P]}	Anne-Marie	3	10 May 2018	1
10 May 2018	1	Cool Like You	Blossoms	4	10 May 2018	1
10 May 2018	1	Dirty Computer	Janelle Monáe	8	10 May 2018	1
17 May 2018	1	Be More Kind	Frank Turner	3	17 May 2018	1
17 May 2018	1	Heaven Before All Hell Breaks Loose	Plan B	5	17 May 2018	1
17 May 2018	1	Attention Attention	Shinedown	8	17 May 2018	1
17 May 2018	1	Singularity	Jon Hopkins	9	17 May 2018	1
24 May 2018	3	Tranquility Base Hotel & Casino	Arctic Monkeys	1	24 May 2018	1
24 May 2018	1	Voicenotes	Charlie Puth	4	24 May 2018	1
24 May 2018	1	The Prodigal Son	Ry Cooder	10	24 May 2018	1
31 May 2018	1	Electric Light	James Bay	2	31 May 2018	1
31 May 2018	1	And Justice for None	Five Finger Death Punch	7	31 May 2018	1
31 May 2018	1	Love Yourself: Tear	BTS	8	31 May 2018	1
31 May 2018	1	Tell Me How You Really Feel	Courtney Barnett	9	31 May 2018	1
7 June 2018	3	Wildness	Snow Patrol	2	7 June 2018	1
7 June 2018	2	Shawn Mendes	Shawn Mendes	3	7 June 2018	1
7 June 2018	1	MTV Unplugged: Live at Roundhouse, London	Biffy Clyro	4	7 June 2018	1
7 June 2018	1	Love Is Dead	Chvrches	7	7 June 2018	1
14 June 2018	2	ye	Kanye West	2	14 June 2018	1
14 June 2018	1	Noonday Dream	Ben Howard	4	14 June 2018	1
14 June 2018	1	As Long as I Have You	Roger Daltrey	8	14 June 2018	1
14 June 2018	1	Prequelle	Ghost	10	14 June 2018	1
21 June 2018	1	Lost & Found	Jorja Smith	3	21 June 2018	1
21 June 2018	3	The Beach Boys with the Royal Philharmonic Orchestra	The Beach Boys with the Royal Philharmonic Orchestra	4	21 June 2018	2
21 June 2018	1	Kids See Ghosts	Kids See Ghosts	7	21 June 2018	1
21 June 2018	1	No Shame	Lily Allen	8	21 June 2018	1
28 June 2018	1	Youngblood	5 Seconds of Summer	3	28 June 2018	1
28 June 2018	2	Everything Is Love	The Carters	5	28 June 2018	1
28 June 2018	1	Call the Comet	Johnny Marr	7	28 June 2018	1
5 July 2018	2	Pray for the Wicked	Panic! at the Disco	2	5 July 2018	1
5 July 2018	3	Cruising with Jane McDonald	Jane McDonald	6	5 July 2018	1
12 July 2018	12	Scorpion (#5)	Drake	1	12 July 2018	3
12 July 2018	4	High as Hope ^{[Q]}	Florence + the Machine	2	12 July 2018	1
12 July 2018	1	The Now Now	Gorillaz	5	12 July 2018	1
12 July 2018	1	Appetite for Destruction	Guns N' Roses	6	12 July 2018	1
19 July 2018	2	Palo Santo	Years & Years	3	19 July 2018	1
19 July 2018	1	Lighting Matches	Tom Grennan	5	19 July 2018	1
26 July 2018	1	Night & Day: Day Edition ^{[R]}	The Vamps	2	26 July 2018	1
26 July 2018	17	Mamma Mia! Here We Go Again: The Movie Soundtrack (#4) ^{[S]}	Mamma Mia! film cast	1	2 August 2018	5
26 July 2018	2	Beautiful Life	Rick Astley	6	26 July 2018	1
2 August 2018	6	Mamma Mia! The Movie Soundtrack ^{[T]}	Mamma Mia! film cast	5	2 August 2018	2
2 August 2018	3	ABBA Gold: Greatest Hits ^{[U]}	ABBA	6	9 August 2018	1
9 August 2018	1	Vicious	Halestorm	8	9 August 2018	1
16 August 2018	2	Astroworld	Travis Scott	3	16 August 2018	1
16 August 2018	1	Living in Extraordinary Times	James	6	16 August 2018	1
16 August 2018	1	Rituals	Deaf Havana	8	16 August 2018	1
23 August 2018	2	Queen	Nicki Minaj	5	23 August 2018	1
23 August 2018	1	Coup de Grace	Miles Kane	8	23 August 2018	1
23 August 2018	1	Where No One Stands Alone	Elvis Presley	9	23 August 2018	1
30 August 2018	9	Sweetener	Ariana Grande	1	30 August 2018	1
30 August 2018	1	B. Inspired	Bugzy Malone	6	30 August 2018	1
30 August 2018	1	Under My Skin	Gabrielle	7	30 August 2018	1
30 August 2018	1	Acts of Fear and Love	Slaves	8	30 August 2018	1
6 September 2018	1	Marauder	Interpol	6	6 September 2018	1
6 September 2018	1	Rainier Fog	Alice in Chains	9	6 September 2018	1
13 September 2018	8	Kamikaze (#10)	Eminem	1	13 September 2018	4
13 September 2018	1	Joy as an Act of Resistance	IDLES	5	13 September 2018	1
13 September 2018	1	Runaway	Passenger	6	13 September 2018	1
13 September 2018	1	Let’s Go Sunshine	The Kooks	9	13 September 2018	1
13 September 2018	1	Bloom	Troye Sivan	10	13 September 2018	1
20 September 2018	1	Egypt Station	Paul McCartney	3	20 September 2018	1
20 September 2018	1	Gold	T. Rex	8	20 September 2018	1
20 September 2018	1	In the Blue Light	Paul Simon	10	20 September 2018	1
27 September 2018	2	True Meanings	Paul Weller	2	27 September 2018	1
27 September 2018	1	My Mind Makes Noises	Pale Waves	8	27 September 2018	1
27 September 2018	1	7	David Guetta	9	27 September 2018	1
27 September 2018	1	For Ever	Jungle	10	27 September 2018	1
4 October 2018	1	Chris	Christine and the Queens	3	4 October 2018	1
4 October 2018	1	Living the Dream	Slash featuring Myles Kennedy and the Conspirators	4	4 October 2018	1
4 October 2018	1	The Blue Hour	Suede	5	4 October 2018	1
4 October 2018	1	Bridges	Josh Groban	6	4 October 2018	1
4 October 2018	1	Redemption	Joe Bonamassa	7	4 October 2018	1
11 October 2018	5	Blood Red Roses	Rod Stewart	1	11 October 2018	1
11 October 2018	3	Dancing Queen	Cher	2	11 October 2018	1
11 October 2018	1	Tha Carter V	Lil Wayne	5	11 October 2018	1
11 October 2018	1	Gold	Chas & Dave	8	11 October 2018	1
11 October 2018	1	It's About Time	Nile Rodgers & Chic	10	11 October 2018	1
18 October 2018	23	A Star is Born (#7)	Lady Gaga & Bradley Cooper	1	18 October 2018	2
18 October 2018	2	Trench	Twenty One Pilots	2	18 October 2018	1
18 October 2018	1	VI	You Me at Six	6	18 October 2018	1
25 October 2018	13	Always in Between ^{[V]}	Jess Glynne	1	25 October 2018	1
25 October 2018	1	Piano Odyssey	Rick Wakeman	7	25 October 2018	1
1 November 2018	1	Natural Rebel	Richard Ashcroft	4	1 November 2018	1
1 November 2018	45	Bohemian Rhapsody: The Original Soundtrack ^{[W]}	Queen	3	8 November 2018	5
1 November 2018	1	Evolution	Disturbed	7	1 November 2018	1
8 November 2018	8	Sì	Andrea Bocelli	1	8 November 2018	1
8 November 2018	1	Jubilee Road	Tom Odell	5	8 November 2018	1
8 November 2018	10	The Platinum Collection ^{[X]}	Queen	5	22 November 2018	1
15 November 2018	1	No Tourists	The Prodigy	1	15 November 2018	1
15 November 2018	1	Walls	Barbra Streisand	6	15 November 2018	1
15 November 2018	1	The Bootleg Series Vol. 14: More Blood, More Tracks	Bob Dylan	9	15 November 2018	1
22 November 2018	1	Simulation Theory	Muse	1	22 November 2018	1
22 November 2018	5	You Know I Know ^{[Y]}	Olly Murs	2	22 November 2018	1
22 November 2018	1	The Beatles: 50th Anniversary Edition ^{[Z]}	The Beatles	4	22 November 2018	1
22 November 2018	1	In Harmony	Aled Jones & Russell Watson	8	22 November 2018	1
22 November 2018	1	Origins	Imagine Dragons	9	22 November 2018	1
29 November 2018	6	Love (#8)	Michael Bublé	1	29 November 2018	1
29 November 2018	1	Delta	Mumford & Sons	2	29 November 2018	1
29 November 2018	3	LM5 ^{[AA]}	Little Mix	3	29 November 2018	1
29 November 2018	1	Thank You & Goodnight	Boyzone	6	29 November 2018	1
29 November 2018	1	The Last King of Pop	Paul Heaton	10	29 November 2018	1
6 December 2018	8	Odyssey	Take That	1	6 December 2018	1
6 December 2018	1	Rise Up	Cliff Richard	4	6 December 2018	1
6 December 2018	6	Unchained Melodies ♦	Roy Orbison with the Royal Philharmonic Orchestra	3	3 January 2019	1
6 December 2018	1	As Time Goes By	Alfie Boe	10	6 December 2018	1
13 December 2018	2	A Brief Inquiry into Online Relationships ^{[BB]}	The 1975	1	13 December 2018	1
13 December 2018	1	True Love Ways	Buddy Holly with the Royal Philharmonic Orchestra	10	13 December 2018	1
20 December 2018	2	Carpenters with the Royal Philharmonic Orchestra	The Carpenters with the Royal Philharmonic Orchestra	8	20 December 2018	1
27 December 2018	1	Springsteen on Broadway	Bruce Springsteen	6	27 December 2018	1
27 December 2018	8	50 Years – Don't Stop ♦	Fleetwood Mac	5	17 January 2019	1

== Entries by artist ==
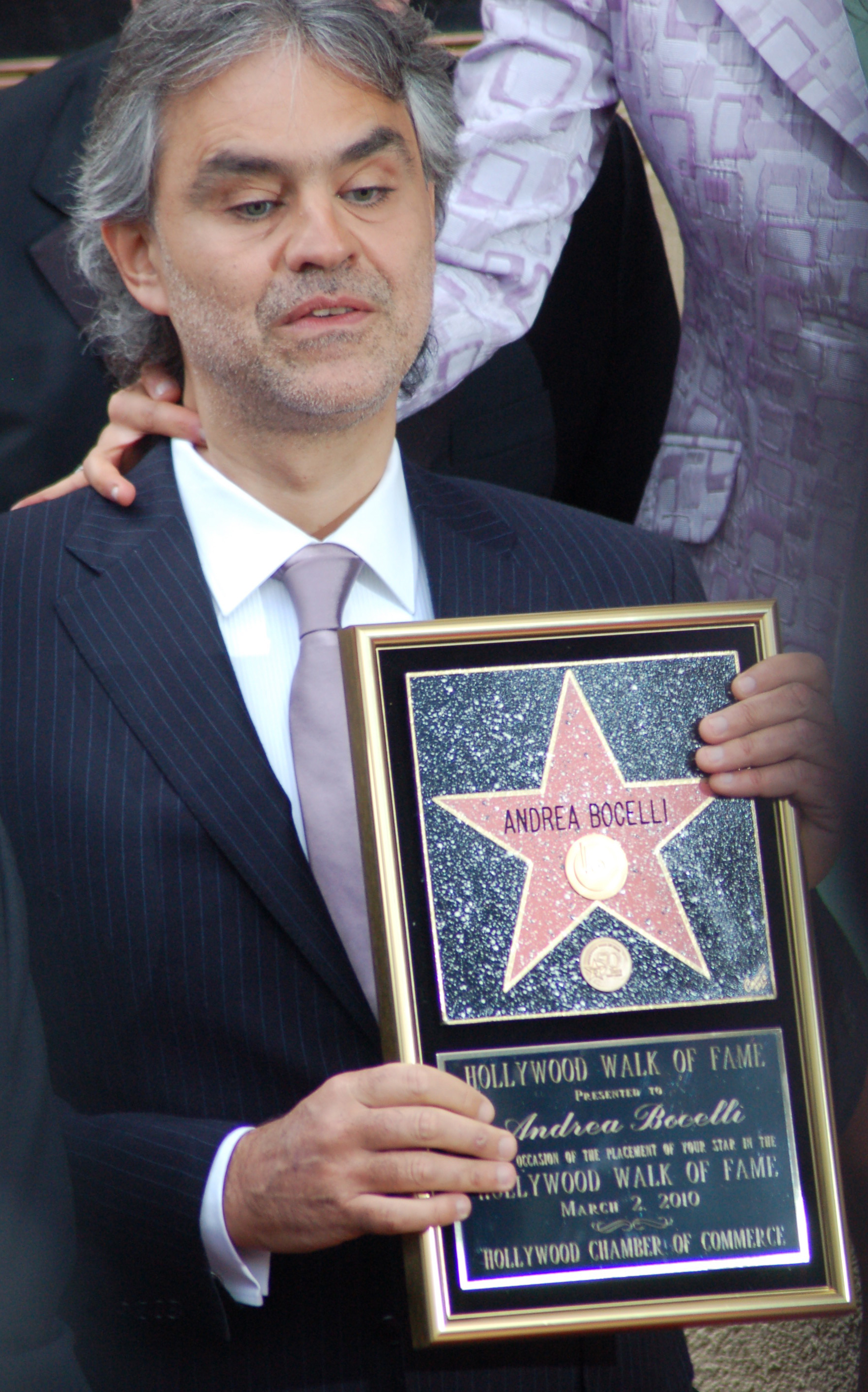
Italian tenor Andrea Bocelli secured his first ever UK number-one album in November 2018 with Sì. It was the first classical album to reach the top spot in the UK since Titanic: Music from the Motion Picture by James Horner in 1998.

The following table shows artists who have achieved two or more top 10 entries in 2018, including albums that reached their peak in 2017. The figures only include main artists, with featured artists and appearances on compilation albums not counted individually for each artist. The total number of weeks an artist spent in the top ten in 2018 is also shown.

Entries	Artist	Weeks	Albums
5	Royal Philharmonic Orchestra	11	A Love So Beautiful. The Beach Boys with the Royal Philharmonic Orchestra, Carpenters with the Royal Philharmonic Orchestra, True Love Ways, Unchained Melodies
2	Cher ^{[CC]}	14	Dancing Queen, Mamma Mia! Here We Go Again: The Movie Soundtrack
2	Ed Sheeran ^{[DD]}	38	÷, X
2	Eminem ^{[DD]}	14	Kamikaze, Revival
2	George Ezra	28	Staying at Tamara's, Wanted on Voyage
2	Joe Bonamassa	2	Black Coffee, Redemption
2	Mamma Mia! film cast	14	Mamma Mia! The Movie Soundtrack, Mamma Mia! Here We Go Again: The Movie Soundtrack
2	Little Mix	6	Glory Days, LM5
2	Michael Bublé	9	Christmas, Love
2	Paul McCartney ^{[EE]}	2	The Beatles: 50th Anniversary Edition, Egypt Station
2	Queen	10	Bohemian Rhapsody: The Original Soundtrack, The Platinum Collection
2	Slash ^{[FF]}	2	Appetite for Destruction, Living the Dream

== Notes ==
- ^{a} Glory Days re-entered the top 10 at number 10 on 18 January 2018 (week ending) for 2 weeks.
- ^{b} Human re-entered the top 10 at number 4 on 1 March 2018 (week ending) for 4 weeks.
- ^{c} Gang Signs & Prayer re-entered the top 10 at number 10 on 1 March 2018 (week ending) for 2 weeks.
- ^{d} ÷ re-entered the top 10 at number 7 on 6 September 2018 (week ending), at number 9 on 20 September 2018 (week ending) and at number 10 on 24 January 2019 (week ending).
- ^{e} Dua Lipa re-entered the top 10 at number 10 on 25 January 2018 (week ending) for 4 weeks, at number 3 on 1 March 2018 (week ending) for 7 weeks, at number 8 on 26 April 2018 (week ending) for 5 weeks and at number 9 on 24 January 2019 (week ending).
- ^{f} Beautiful Trauma re-entered the top 10 at number 9 on 15 February 2018 (week ending) for 5 weeks.
- ^{g} The Thrill of It All re-entered the top 10 at number 6 on 8 March 2018 (week ending) for 3 weeks, at number 10 on 5 April 2018 (week ending) for 2 weeks and at number 10 on 26 April 2018 (week ending).
- ^{h} Reputation re-entered the top 10 at number 8 on 11 January 2018 (week ending) for 3 weeks.
- ^{i} Diamonds re-entered the top 10 at number 10 on 11 January 2018 (week ending).
- ^{j} Christmas originally peaked at number 1 on 26 November 2011 (week ending) upon its initial release. It re-entered the top 10 at number 10 on 23 December 2017 (week ending), rising to number 8 on 4 January 2018 (week ending). It re-entered the top 10 again later in the year at number 7 on 13 December 2018 (week ending), peaking at number 5 on its current run on 3 January 2019 (week ending).
- ^{k} × originally peaked at number 1 on 5 July 2014 (week ending) upon its initial release. It re-entered the top 10 at number 10 on 8 March 2018 (week ending) and at number 10 on 29 March 2018 (week ending).
- ^{l} Question Mark re-entered the top 10 at number 9 on 28 June 2018 (week ending) for 2 weeks, at number 10 on 19 July 2018 (week ending) and at number 10 on 2 August 2018 (week ending).
- ^{m} Staying at Tamara's re-entered the top 10 at number 6 on 11 October 2018 (week ending) for 5 weeks and at number 9 on 6 December 2018 (week ending) for 7 weeks.
- ^{n} Wanted on Voyage originally peaked at number-one upon its initial release in 2014.
- ^{o} Beerbongs & Bentleys re-entered the top 10 at number 10 on 6 September 2018 (week ending).
- ^{p} Speak Your Mind re-entered the top 10 at number 10 on 28 June 2018 (week ending) for 2 weeks.
- ^{q} High as Hope re-entered the top 10 at number 10 on 9 August 2018 (week ending).
- ^{r} Night & Day was released in two parts, titled Night Edition and Day Edition. Night Edition peaked at number-one in 2017, with Day Edition reaching number 2 this year. The Official Charts website marks this as a re-entry but they were actually separate releases.
- ^{s} Mamma Mia! Here We Go Again: The Movie Soundtrack re-entered the top 10 at number 9 on 10 January 2019 (week ending) for 3 weeks.
- ^{t} Mamma Mia! The Movie Soundtrack was ineligible for the Official Album Chart when it was first released in 2008 to support the film Mamma Mia!, but it did top the Official Soundtrack Chart for fifteen consecutive weeks that year.
- ^{u} Gold: Greatest Hits originally peaked at number-one upon its initial release in 1992. It re-entered the top 10 due to the film Mamma Mia! Here We Go Again.
- ^{v} Always In Between re-entered the top 10 at number 7 on 10 January 2019 (week ending) for 5 weeks and at number 10 on 21 February 2019 (week ending) and at number 7 on 7 March 2019 (week ending) for 2 weeks.
- ^{w} Bohemian Rhapsody re-entered the top 10 at number 5 on 29 November 2018 (week ending) for 4 weeks, at number 9 on 3 January 2019 (week ending) for 26 weeks and at number 7 on 18 July 2019 (week ending) for 4 weeks (as of 8 August 2019, week ending).
- ^{x} The Platinum Collection originally peaked outside the top 10 at number 63 upon its initial release in 2000. It charted in the top 10 for the first time in 2002, peaking at number 2. It re-entered the top 10 at number 10 on 17 January 2019 (week ending) and the same position on 31 January 2019 (week ending) for 2 weeks. It re-entered again at number 9 on 21 February 2019 (week ending) for 4 weeks.
- ^{y} You Know I Know re-entered the top 10 at number 10 on 27 December 2018 (week ending) for 3 weeks.
- ^{z} The Beatles originally peaked at number-one upon its initial release in 1968.
- ^{aa} LM5 re-entered the top 10 at number 10 on 20 December 2018 (week ending).
- ^{bb} A Brief Enquiry into Online Relationships re-entered the top 10 at number 10 on 7 March 2019 (week ending).
- ^{cc} Figure includes an album with the Mamma Mia! film cast.
- ^{dd} Figure includes album that peaked in 2017.
- ^{ee} Figure includes an album with the group The Beatles.
- ^{ff} Figure includes an album with the group Guns N' Roses.

== See also ==
- 2018 in British music
- List of UK Albums Chart number ones of the 2010s
