= Laniakea =

Laniakea or laniākea is a Hawaiian word, lit. 'immense heaven'.

Laniakea or Laniākea may also refer to:

- Laniakea Supercluster, a large-scale structure and basin of attraction of galaxies centered around the Great Attractor (sometimes referred to as a supercluster depending on various definitions) that includes the Milky Way and Virgo Supercluster lobe
- Laniākea, a building in Honolulu, see YWCA Building (Honolulu, Hawaii)
- Laniākea Beach, a beach in Hawaii, see List of beaches in Hawaii
- "Laniakea Waltz", a 1964 composition from the Lalo Schifrin album Gone with the Wave
- "Laniakea", the tenth track from the album Mothers by British indie rock band Swim Deep
- Laniakea, a board game by Marco Teubner
