= Charlie Hugall =

British music artist

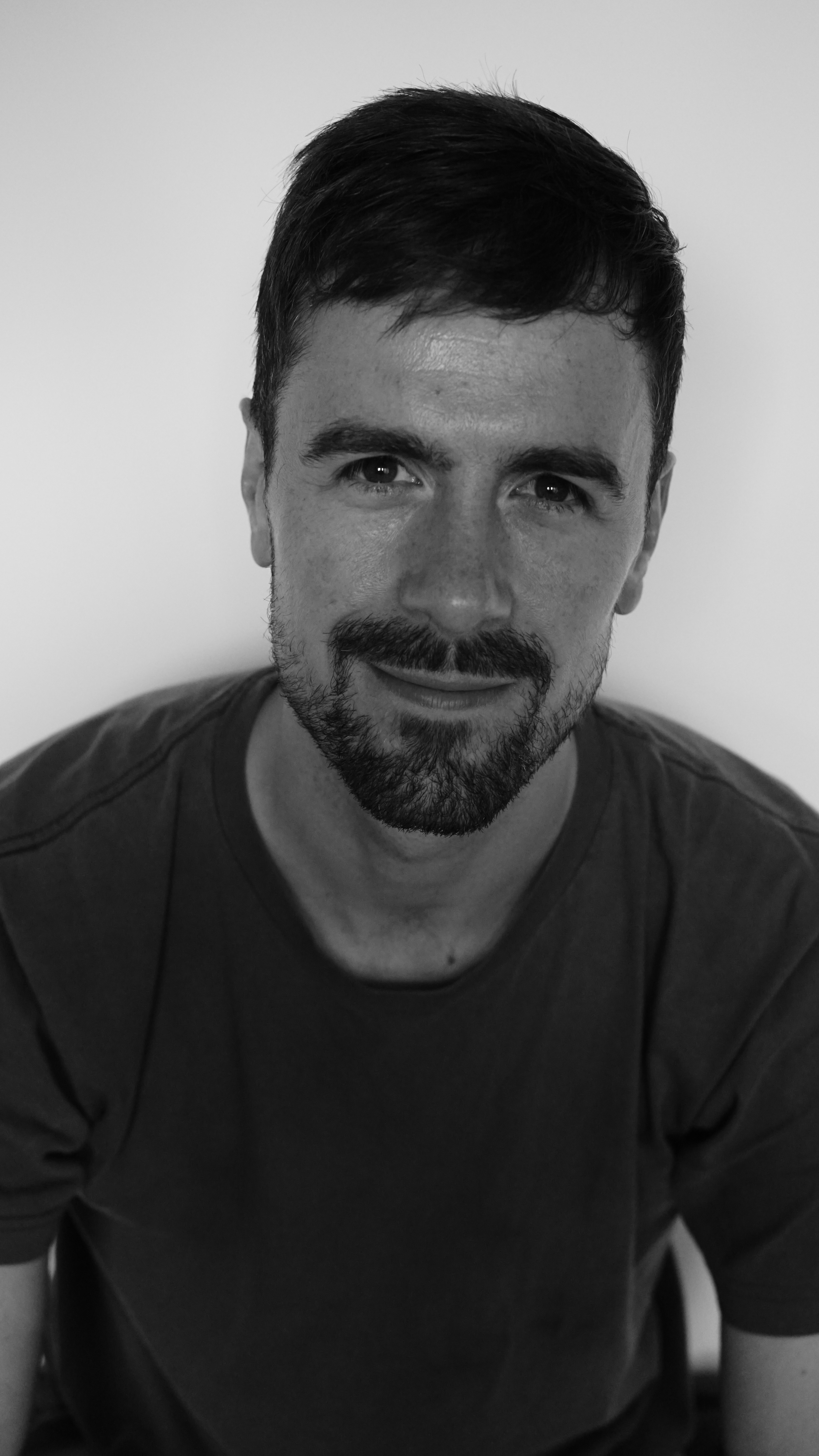

Background information
- Origin: Brixton, London, England, United Kingdom
- Genres: Rock, indie rock, punk rock, dance, pop
- Occupations: Record producer, songwriter, mix engineer
- Years active: 2009–present
- Website: charliehugall.com

Charlie Hugall (born 1984) is a British music producer, songwriter and mix engineer. He has produced and mixed records for Florence and the Machine, Ed Sheeran, Halsey, Swim Deep, Kaiser Chiefs, Lucy Rose, Crystal Fighters and others.

== Career ==
Starting his career as a studio engineer at The Dairy Studios in Brixton, Charlie made use of downtime in the studio to invite artists he found to record. Through this period he came to prominence as a producer with Florence + the Machine's song "You've Got the Love". It spawned a second spin-off single featuring Dizzee Rascal "You Got the Dirtee Love".

Charlie also worked with Florence Welch to produce "My Boy Builds Coffins" from her debut album Lungs and to mix and produce the bonus disc on the second album, Ceremonials.

Soon after his work with Florence + the Machine, he began work mixing and adding additional production to Crystal Fighters' – Star of Love, Delilah's – From the Roots Up (which debuted at number #5), in addition to production work for The 2:54, The Maccabees, Alex Winston and the Kaiser Chiefs.

In 2013, Hugall was awarded Breakthrough Engineer of the Year by the Music Producers Guild. That year, he produced Swim Deep's critically acclaimed top 10 album Where the Heaven Are We before working on Dry The River's second album Alarms in the Heart in 2014 and writing and producing Halsey's song "Haunting" off her hit debut album Badlands in 2015.

In response to the Paris bombings, in Dec 2015 he produced the Florence & The Machine collaboration with The Maccabees honouring the victims of the attacks with a cover of the Eagles of Death Metal's "I Love You All the Time"

== Songwriting and production credits ==
Title	Year	Artist(s)	Album	Credits	Written with	Produced with
"My Boy Builds Coffins"	2009	Florence + The Machine	Lungs	Producer	-	-
"You've Got the Love"	2009	Florence + The Machine	Lungs	Producer	-	-
"Are You Hurting the One You Love?"	2009	Florence + The Machine	Lungs	Producer	-	-
"You Need Me, I Don't Need You"	2011	Ed Sheeran	+	Producer	-	Jake Gosling
"Grade 8"	2011	Ed Sheeran	+	Additional producer	-	Jake Gosling
"Honey"	2012	Swim Deep	Where the Heaven Are We	Producer	-	-
"The Sea"	2013	Swim Deep	Where the Heaven Are We	Producer	-	-
"She Changes the Weather"	2013	Swim Deep	Where the Heaven Are We	Co-writer/Producer	Austin Williams	-
"King City"	2013	Swim Deep	Where the Heaven Are We	Producer	-	-
"Intro"	2013	Swim Deep	Where the Heaven Are We	Producer	-	-
"Francisco"	2013	Swim Deep	Where the Heaven Are We	Producer	-	-
"Colour Your Ways"	2013	Swim Deep	Where the Heaven Are We	Producer	-	-
"Make My Sun Shine"	2013	Swim Deep	Where the Heaven Are We	Producer	-	-
"Red Lips I Know"	2013	Swim Deep	Where the Heaven Are We	Producer	-	-
"Soul Trippin"	2013	Swim Deep	Where the Heaven Are We	Producer	-	-
"Stray"	2013	Swim Deep	Where the Heaven Are We	Producer	-	-
"Crush"	2013	Swim Deep	Where the Heaven Are We	Producer	-	-
"Maway"	2014	Dan Croll	Sweet Disarray	Producer	-	Joe Wills
"Make Up Your Mind"	2015	Florence + The Machine	How Big, How Blue, How Beautiful	Producer	-	Kid Harpoon
"Pure Feeling"	2015	Florence + The Machine	How Big, How Blue, How Beautiful	Producer	-	-
"Haunting"	2015	Halsey	Badlands	Co-writer/Producer	Ashley Frangipane, Robert Tortelli, Christopher Hugall	Heavy Mellow
"Hurt Me"	2015	Låpsley	Long Way Home	Vocal Producer	-	Låpsley, Rodaidh McDonald, Tourist
"Love is Blind"	2016	Låpsley	Long Way Home	Vocal Producer	-	Låpsley, Rodaidh McDonald, ROMANS
"Swim"	2016	Fickle Friends	You Are Someone Else	Producer	-	Fickle Friends
"Something in the Water"	2016	Tom Grennan	Lighting Matches	Producer	-	-
"Old Songs"	2016	Tom Grennan	Something in the Water EP	Producer	-	-
"Sweet Hallelujah"	2016	Tom Grennan	Lighting Matches	Producer	-	-
"Praying"	2017	Tom Grennan	Lighting Matches	Producer	-	-
"Giving It All"	2017	Tom Grennan	Release the Brakes EP	Producer	-	-
"This Is the Age"	2017	Tom Grennan	Release the Brakes EP	Producer	-	-
"Patience"	2017	Tom Grennan	Release the Brakes EP	Producer	-	-
"Found What I've Been Looking For"	2017	Tom Grennan	Lighting Matches	Producer	-	-
"Watch Me Read You"	2017	Odette	To A Stranger	Co-writer	Georgia Sallybanks	-
"Collide"	2017	Odette	To A Stranger	Co-writer	Georgia Sallybanks	-
"She"	2018	Fickle Friends	You Are Someone Else	Producer	-	Fickle Friends
"All My Friends"	2019	Dermot Kennedy	Dermot Kennedy	Co-writer	Dermot Kennedy	-
"Love is Back"	2020	Celeste	Not Your Muse	Producer	-	Josh Crocker
