= List of UK top-ten albums in 2019 =

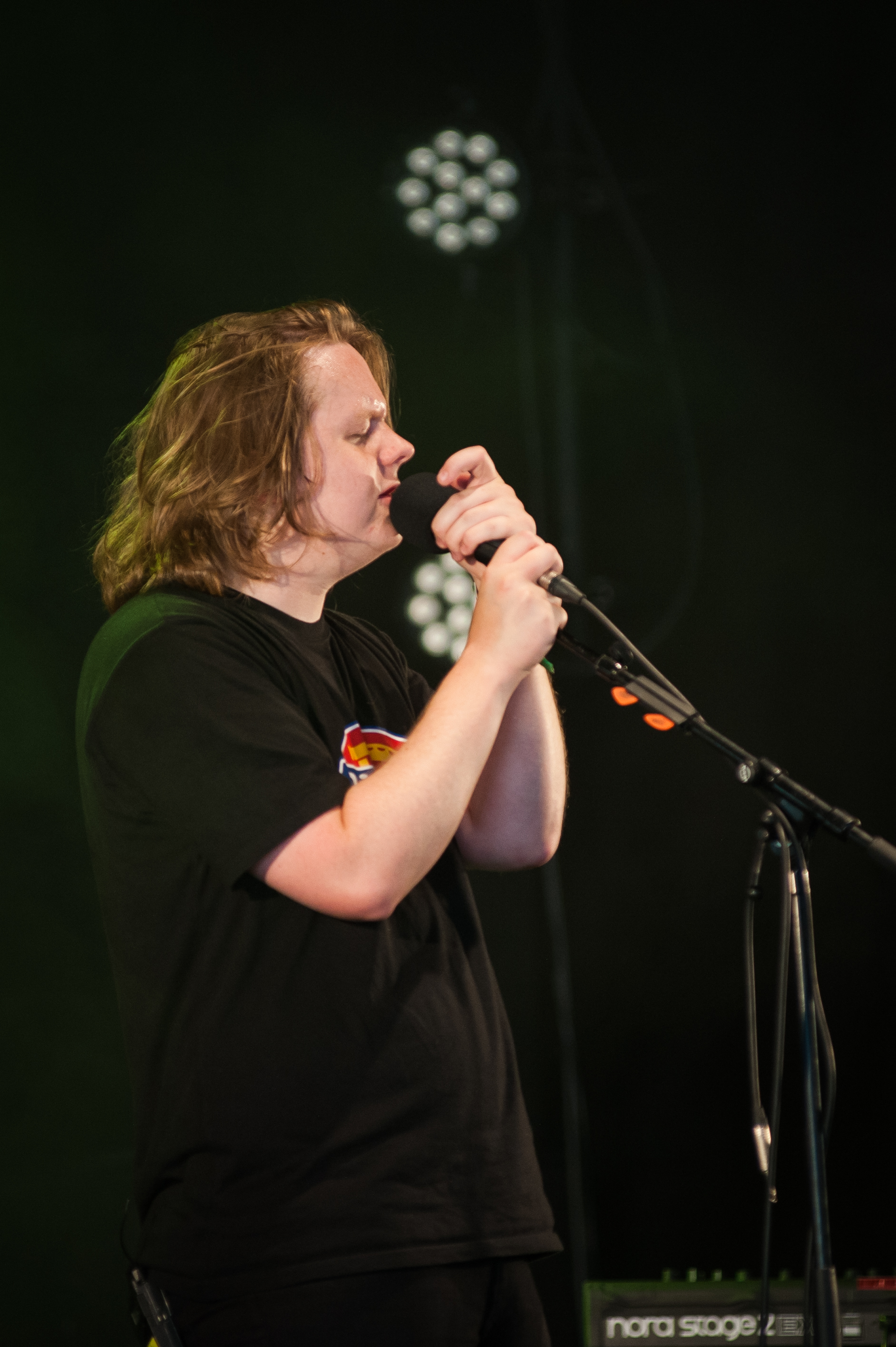
Scottish singer and songwriter Lewis Capaldi had the best-selling album of 2019 with his debut release Divinely Uninspired to a Hellish Extent. The album went straight in at number-one in May and spent a total of 85 non-consecutive weeks in the top 10, 10 of which were at the top spot. It also became the best-selling album of 2020. The album spawned four UK top 10 singles, including the number-ones "Someone You Loved" and "Before You Go".

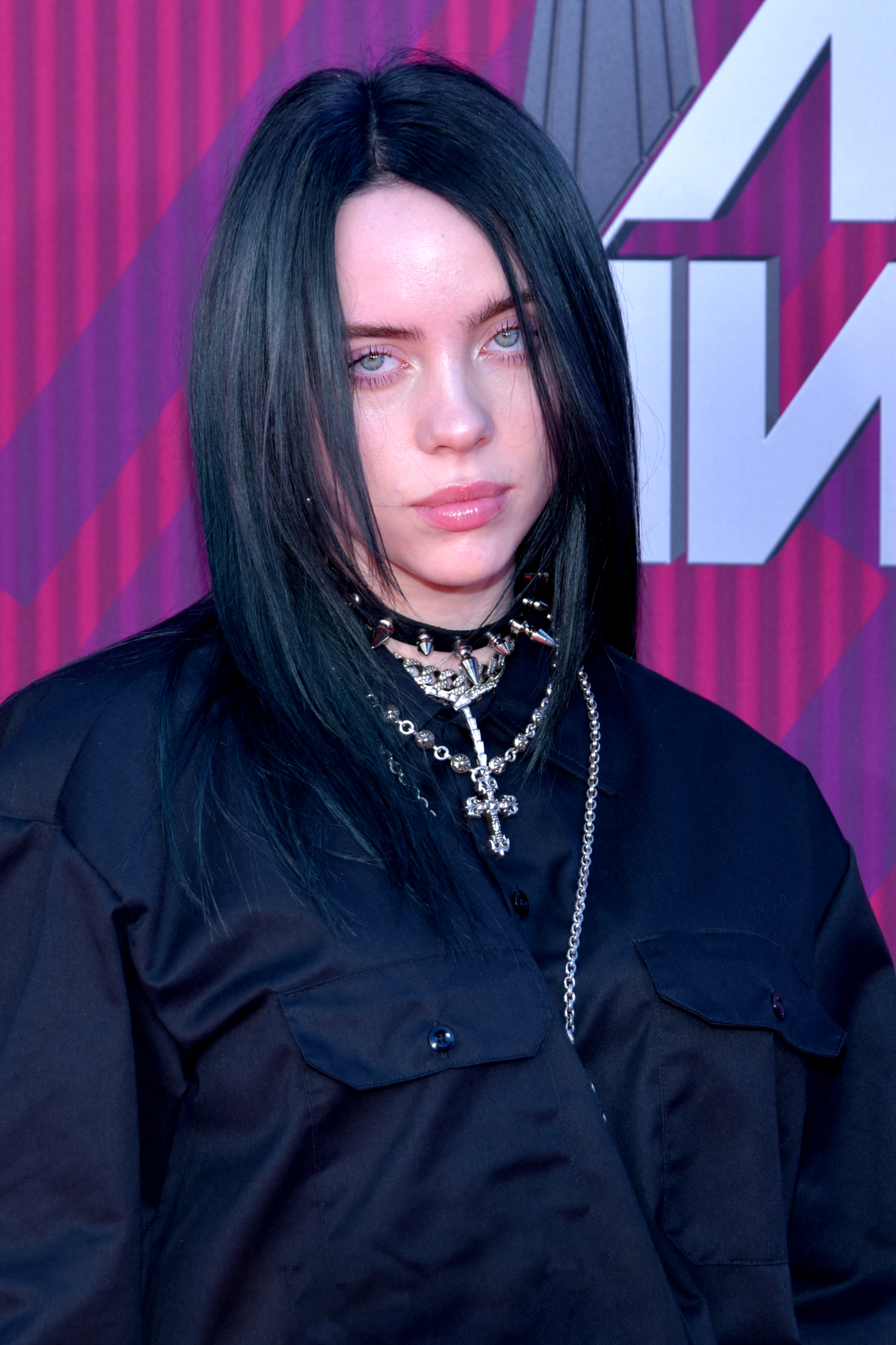
US singer-songwriter Billie Eilish was 17 years and four months old when she became the youngest ever female artist to achieve a UK number-one album. Her debut release, When We All Fall Asleep, Where Do We Go?, entered the chart at the top spot in April and spent a total of 50 non-consecutive weeks in the top 10.

The UK Albums Chart is one of many music charts compiled by the Official Charts Company that calculates the best-selling albums of the week in the United Kingdom. Since 2004, the chart has been based on the sales of both physical albums and digital downloads. Since 2015, the album chart has been based on both sales and streaming. This list shows albums that peaked in the top ten of the UK Albums Chart during 2019, as well as albums which peaked in 2018 and 2020 but were in the top 10 in 2019. The entry date is when the album appeared in the top 10 for the first time (week ending, as published by the Official Charts Company, which is six days after the chart is announced).

One-hundred and seventy-three albums were in the top ten this year. Two albums from 2017 and fifteen albums from 2018 remained in the top ten for several weeks at the beginning of the year, while Heavy Is the Head by Stormzy was released in 2019 but did not reach its peak until 2020. Fine Line by Harry Styles debuted this year but its peak position was not until two years later in 2021. Christmas by Michael Bublé was originally released in 2011, launched a new chart run in 2018, reaching a peak on its latest run in 2019 and again in 2020. 50 Years – Don't Stop by Fleetwood Mac and Unchained Melodies by Roy Orbison & The Royal Philharmonic Orchestra were the albums from 2018 to reach their peak in 2019. Four artists have scored multiple entries in the top 10 in 2019, as of 12 September 2019 (week ending). AJ Tracey, Freya Ridings, Khalid, Lewis Capaldi, Sigrid and Tom Walker were among the many artists who achieved their first UK charting top ten album in 2019.

The Greatest Showman Cast's The Greatest Showman: Original Motion Picture Soundtrack remained at the top of the chart for the opening four weeks of the year, totalling twenty-eight weeks at number-one since it was released in January 2018. The first new number-one album of the year was Amo by Bring Me the Horizon. Overall, thirty-one different albums peaked at number-one in 2019, with thirty-one unique artists hitting that position.

== Background ==
=== Multiple entries ===
One-hundred and seventeen albums have charted in the top ten in 2019 (as of 12 September 2019, week ending), with one-hundred and three albums reaching their peak this year (including the re-entries Diamonds and Direct Hits, which charted in previous years but reached a peak on their latest chart run).

Four artists have scored multiple entries in the top ten in 2019 (as of 12 September 2019, week ending).

=== Chart debuts ===
The following table (collapsed on desktop site) does not include acts who had previously charted as part of a group and secured their first top-ten solo album, or featured appearances on compilations or other artists recordings.

Artist	Number of top 10s	First entry	Chart position	Other entries
AJ Tracey	1	AJ Tracey	3	—
D-Block Europe	2	Home Alone	6	PTSD (4)
Sleaford Mods	1	Eton Alive	9	—
Tom Walker	1	What a Time to Be Alive	1	—
Dave	1	Psychodrama	1	—
Sigrid	1	Sucker Punch	4	—
Billie Eilish	1	When We All Fall Asleep, Where Do We Go?	1	—
Khalid	1	Free Spirit	2	—
Marty Wilde	1	Dreamboats & Petticoats Presents The Very Best of Marty Wilde	7	—
Fontaines D.C.	1	Dogrel	9	—
Loyle Carner	1	Not Waving, but Drowning	3	—
Jade Bird	1	Jade Bird	10	—
Kiefer Sutherland	1	Reckless & Me	9	—
Lewis Capaldi	1	Divinely Uninspired to a Hellish Extent	1	—
Rammstein	1	Rammstein	3	—
Slowthai	1	Nothing Great About Britain	9	—
Rocketman Cast	1	Rocketman: Music from the Motion Picture	5	—
MoStack	1	Stacko	3	—
Freya Ridings	1	Freya Ridings	3	—
NF	1	The Search	7	—
Mabel	1	High Expectations	3	—
Volbeat	1	Rewind, Replay, Rebound	7	—
Young Thug	1	So Much Fun	9	—
Headie One	1	Music x Road	5	—
Aitch	1	AitcH20 (EP)	3	—
Melanie Martinez	1	K-12	8	—
Jax Jones	1	Snacks (Supersize)	9	—
Sam Fender	1	Hypersonic Missiles	1	—
Dermot Kennedy	1	Without Fear	1	—
Summer Walker	1	Over It	7	—
Yungblud	1	The Underrated Youth	6	—
Rex Orange County	1	Pony	5	—

Notes

Claire Richards of the group Steps reached the top 10 with her debut solo album this year, Wildest Dreams. This added to her haul of six top 10 albums with Steps to date, including three which had topped the chart. Serge Pizzorno, the lead singer of Kasabian launched his solo project The S.L.P. and released an album of the same name which reached the top 10. All but one of Kasabian's six albums to date made number-one, the only one to miss out being their self-titled debut effort in 2004 which peaked at number four.

=== Soundtracks ===
Soundtrack albums for various films entered the top 10 throughout the year. This included Rocketman: Music from the Motion Picture. Bohemian Rhapsody and The Greatest Showman both remained in the top 10 for much of 2019, after first charting in 2018.

=== Best-selling albums ===
Lewis Capaldi had the best-selling album of the year with Divinely Uninspired to a Hellish Extent. The album spent 36 weeks in the top 10 (31 this year, including eight weeks at number one), recorded over 600,000 combined sales and was certified 2× platinum by the BPI. No. 6 Collaborations Project by Ed Sheeran came in second place. The Greatest Showman Cast's The Greatest Showman: Original Motion Picture Soundtrack, When We All Fall Asleep, Where Do We Go? by Billie Eilish and Staying at Tamara's by George Ezra made up the top five. Albums by Queen, Ariana Grande, Tom Walker, Lady Gaga & Bradley Cooper and Rod Stewart with the Royal Philharmonic Orchestra were also in the top ten best-selling albums of the year.

== Top-ten albums ==
Key

Symbol	Meaning
‡	Album peaked in 2017 or 2018 but still in chart in 2019.
♦	Album released in 2017, 2018 or 2019 but peaked in 2020 or 2021.
(#)	Year-end top ten album position and rank
Entered	The date that the album first appeared in the chart.
Peak	Highest position that the song reached in the UK Albums Chart.

Entered (week ending)	Weeks in top 10	Album	Artist	Peak	Peak reached (week ending)	Weeks at peak
Albums in 2017
16 March 2017	88	÷ ‡ ^{[A]}	Ed Sheeran	1	16 March 2017	20
15 June 2017	28	Dua Lipa ‡ ^{[B]}	Dua Lipa	3	1 March 2018	2
Albums in 2018
11 January 2018	88	The Greatest Showman: Original Motion Picture Soundtrack ‡ (#3)	The Greatest Showman cast	1	18 January 2018	28
5 April 2018	65	Staying at Tamara's ‡ (#5)	George Ezra	1	5 April 2018	1
26 July 2018	17	Mamma Mia! Here We Go Again: The Movie Soundtrack ‡ ^{[C]}	Mamma Mia! film cast	1	2 August 2018	5
18 October 2018	23	A Star is Born ‡ (#9)	Lady Gaga & Bradley Cooper	1	18 October 2018	2
25 October 2018	13	Always In Between ‡ ^{[D]}	Jess Glynne	1	25 October 2018	1
1 November 2018	45	Bohemian Rhapsody: The Original Soundtrack ‡ (#6) ^{[E]}	Queen	3	8 November 2018	5
8 November 2018	10	The Platinum Collection ‡ ^{[F]}	Queen	5	22 November 2018	1
22 November 2018	5	You Know I Know ‡	Olly Murs	2	22 November 2018	1
29 November 2018	6	Love ‡	Michael Bublé	1	29 November 2018	1
6 December 2018	8	Odyssey ‡	Take That	1	6 December 2018	1
6 December 2018	6	Unchained Melodies	Roy Orbison with the Royal Philharmonic Orchestra	3	3 January 2019	1
13 December 2018	2	A Brief Inquiry Into Online Relationships ‡ ^{[G]}	The 1975	1	13 December 2018	1
13 December 2018	8	Christmas ♦	Michael Bublé	2	2 January 2020	1
20 December 2018	2	Carpenters with the Royal Philharmonic Orchestra ‡ ^{[H]}	The Carpenters with the Royal Philharmonic Orchestra	8	20 December 2018	1
27 December 2018	8	50 Years – Don't Stop	Fleetwood Mac	5	17 January 2019	1
Albums in 2019
17 January 2019	1	What Is Love?	Clean Bandit	9	17 January 2019	1
31 January 2019	1	Human (EP)	Dodie	5	31 January 2019	1
31 January 2019	1	Assume Form	James Blake	6	31 January 2019	1
31 January 2019	1	Please Remain Seated	Thunder	8	31 January 2019	1
7 February 2019	2	Amo	Bring Me the Horizon	1	7 February 2019	1
7 February 2019	1	Toast to Our Differences	Rudimental	5	7 February 2019	1
7 February 2019	1	DNA	Backstreet Boys	7	7 February 2019	1
14 February 2019	3	Encore	The Specials	1	14 February 2019	1
14 February 2019	1	Half Way There	Busted	2	14 February 2019	1
14 February 2019	1	Ripples	Ian Brown	4	14 February 2019	1
14 February 2019	1	Third Avenue	Fredo	5	14 February 2019	1
14 February 2019	1	My Wildest Dreams	Claire Richards	9	14 February 2019	1
21 February 2019	12	Thank U, Next (#7) ^{[I]}	Ariana Grande	1	21 February 2019	3
21 February 2019	2	AJ Tracey	AJ Tracey	3	21 February 2019	1
21 February 2019	1	Restless Minds	Ward Thomas	8	21 February 2019	1
28 February 2019	1	Home Alone	D-Block Europe	6	28 February 2019	1
28 February 2019	1	Head Above Water	Avril Lavigne	10	28 February 2019	1
7 March 2019	1	Big Bad...	Giggs	6	7 March 2019	1
7 March 2019	1	Eton Alive	Sleaford Mods	9	7 March 2019	1
14 March 2019	14	What a Time to Be Alive (#8)	Tom Walker	1	14 March 2019	1
14 March 2019	1	Shine a Light	Bryan Adams	2	14 March 2019	1
14 March 2019	1	Wasteland, Baby!	Hozier	6	14 March 2019	1
21 March 2019	5	Psychodrama	Dave	1	21 March 2019	1
21 March 2019	2	Everything Not Saved Will Be Lost – Part 1	Foals	2	21 March 2019	1
21 March 2019	2	Still on My Mind	Dido	3	21 March 2019	1
21 March 2019	1	Sucker Punch	Sigrid	4	21 March 2019	1
21 March 2019	1	Other Aspects – Live At The Royal Festival Hall	Paul Weller	10	21 March 2019	1
28 March 2019	3	Singing to Strangers	Jack Savoretti	1	28 March 2019	1
4 April 2019	2	Coming Home to You	Michael Ball	1	4 April 2019	1
11 April 2019	50	When We All Fall Asleep, Where Do We Go? (#4)	Billie Eilish	1	11 April 2019	3
18 April 2019	2	Free Spirit	Khalid	2	18 April 2019	1
18 April 2019	1	Out of the Blue	Mike and the Mechanics	7	18 April 2019	1
18 April 2019	1	What's It Like Over There?	Circa Waves	10	18 April 2019	1
25 April 2019	2	Map of the Soul: Persona (EP)	BTS	1	25 April 2019	1
25 April 2019	1	No Geography	The Chemical Brothers	4	25 April 2019	1
25 April 2019	1	Dreamboats & Petticoats Presents The Very Best of Marty Wilde	Marty Wilde	7	25 April 2019	1
25 April 2019	1	Dogrel	Fontaines D.C.	9	25 April 2019	1
2 May 2019	1	Not Waving, but Drowning	Loyle Carner	3	2 May 2019	1
2 May 2019	1	Honk	The Rolling Stones	8	2 May 2019	1
2 May 2019	1	Jade Bird	Jade Bird	10	2 May 2019	1
9 May 2019	7	Hurts 2B Human ^{[J]}	Pink	1	9 May 2019	3
9 May 2019	2	The Balance	Catfish and the Bottlemen	2	9 May 2019	1
9 May 2019	1	Love + Fear	Marina	5	9 May 2019	1
9 May 2019	1	Reckless & Me	Kiefer Sutherland	9	9 May 2019	1
9 May 2019	1	In the End	The Cranberries	10	9 May 2019	1
16 May 2019	2	Father of the Bride	Vampire Weekend	2	16 May 2019	1
16 May 2019	1	End of Suffering	Frank Carter & The Rattlesnakes	4	16 May 2019	1
23 May 2019	1	Flesh & Blood	Whitesnake	7	23 May 2019	1
30 May 2019	85	Divinely Uninspired to a Hellish Extent (#1)	Lewis Capaldi	1	30 May 2019	10
30 May 2019	1	I Am Easy to Find	The National	2	30 May 2019	1
30 May 2019	1	Rammstein	Rammstein	3	30 May 2019	1
30 May 2019	1	Igor	Tyler the Creator	4	30 May 2019	1
30 May 2019	1	Father of Asahd	DJ Khaled	6	30 May 2019	1
30 May 2019	1	Nothing Great About Britain	Slowthai	9	30 May 2019	1
6 June 2019	1	California Son	Morrissey	4	6 June 2019	1
6 June 2019	2	Rocketman: Music from the Motion Picture	Various artists	5	6 June 2019	1
6 June 2019	5	Diamonds ^{[K]}	Elton John	6	6 June 2019	1
6 June 2019	1	Future Dust	The Amazons	9	6 June 2019	1
13 June 2019	2	Ignorance Is Bliss	Skepta	2	13 June 2019	1
13 June 2019	1	Further	Richard Hawley	3	13 June 2019	1
13 June 2019	1	Ten	Susan Boyle	5	13 June 2019	1
20 June 2019	1	Happiness Begins	Jonas Brothers	2	20 June 2019	1
20 June 2019	1	Stacko	MoStack	3	20 June 2019	1
20 June 2019	1	Office Politics	The Divine Comedy	5	20 June 2019	1
20 June 2019	1	Tim	Avicii	7	20 June 2019	1
27 June 2019	4	Western Stars	Bruce Springsteen	1	27 June 2019	1
27 June 2019	1	Madame X	Madonna	2	27 June 2019	1
27 June 2019	1	Doom Days	Bastille	4	27 June 2019	1
27 June 2019	1	Unknown Pleasures	Joy Division	5	27 June 2019	1
4 July 2019	1	Lexicon	Will Young	2	4 July 2019	1
4 July 2019	1	Late Night Feelings	Mark Ronson	4	4 July 2019	1
4 July 2019	1	False Alarm	Two Door Cinema Club	5	4 July 2019	1
4 July 2019	1	Help Us Stranger	The Raconteurs	8	4 July 2019	1
11 July 2019	3	Step Back in Time: The Definitive Collection	Kylie Minogue	1	11 July 2019	1
11 July 2019	1	Let's Rock	The Black Keys	3	11 July 2019	1
11 July 2019	3	Direct Hits ^{[L]}	The Killers	5	18 July 2019	1
11 July 2019	1	Indigo	Chris Brown	7	11 July 2019	1
11 July 2019	1	Gold	Hank Marvin	9	11 July 2019	1
18 July 2019	1	Blue Sky in Your Head	Lighthouse Family	3	18 July 2019	1
25 July 2019	48	No.6 Collaborations Project (#2)	Ed Sheeran	1	25 July 2019	5
1 August 2019	2	Freya Ridings	Freya Ridings	3	1 August 2019	1
1 August 2019	1	Anima	Thom Yorke	5	1 August 2019	1
8 August 2019	1	Duck	Kaiser Chiefs	3	8 August 2019	1
8 August 2019	1	The Search	NF	7	8 August 2019	1
15 August 2019	2	High Expectations	Mabel	3	15 August 2019	1
15 August 2019	1	Care Package	Drake	4	15 August 2019	1
15 August 2019	1	Rewind, Replay, Rebound	Volbeat	7	15 August 2019	1
22 August 2019	3	We Are Not Your Kind	Slipknot	1	22 August 2019	1
22 August 2019	1	Tallulah	Feeder	4	22 August 2019	1
29 August 2019	1	No Man's Land	Frank Turner	3	29 August 2019	1
29 August 2019	1	This Is Not a Safe Place	Ride	7	29 August 2019	1
29 August 2019	1	So Much Fun	Young Thug	9	29 August 2019	1
5 September 2019	6	Lover	Taylor Swift	1	5 September 2019	1
5 September 2019	1	Music x Road	Headie One	5	5 September 2019	1
12 September 2019	3	Norman F**king Rockwell	Lana Del Rey	1	12 September 2019	1
12 September 2019	1	Fear Inoculum	Tool	4	12 September 2019	1
12 September 2019	1	Definitely Maybe	Oasis	6	12 September 2019	1
12 September 2019	1	The S.L.P.	The S.L.P.	7	12 September 2019	1
12 September 2019	1	Hoodies All Summer	Kano	8	12 September 2019	1
12 September 2019	1	Threads	Sheryl Crow	10	12 September 2019	1
19 September 2019	13	Hollywood's Bleeding	Post Malone	1	19 September 2019	1
19 September 2019	1	AitcH2O (EP)	Aitch	3	19 September 2019	1
19 September 2019	1	Backbone	Status Quo	6	19 September 2019	1
19 September 2019	1	K-12	Melanie Martinez	8	19 September 2019	1
19 September 2019	1	Snacks (Supersize)	Jax Jones	9	19 September 2019	1
26 September 2019	3	Hypersonic Missiles	Sam Fender	1	26 September 2019	1
26 September 2019	1	Real Life	Emeli Sandé	6	26 September 2019	1
26 September 2019	1	Beneath the Eyrie	Pixies	7	26 September 2019	1
26 September 2019	1	III	The Lumineers	8	26 September 2019	1
26 September 2019	1	The Nothing	Korn	9	26 September 2019	1
3 October 2019	4	Why Me? Why Not.	Liam Gallagher	1	3 October 2019	1
3 October 2019	1	Cause and Effect	Keane	2	3 October 2019	1
3 October 2019	1	Nine	Blink-182	6	3 October 2019	1
10 October 2019	3	Abbey Road: 50th Anniversary Edition	The Beatles	1	10 October 2019	1
10 October 2019	4	PTSD	D-Block Europe	4	10 October 2019	1
17 October 2019	1	Without Fear	Dermot Kennedy	1	17 October 2019	1
17 October 2019	2	Over It	Summer Walker	7	17 October 2019	1
17 October 2019	1	Live in the City of Angels	Simple Minds	9	17 October 2019	1
17 October 2019	1	Easter Is Cancelled	The Darkness	10	17 October 2019	1
24 October 2019	1	Giants of All Sizes	Elbow	1	24 October 2019	1
31 October 2019	1	Everything Not Saved Will Be Lost – Part 2	Foals	1	31 October 2019	1
31 October 2019	2	You	James Arthur	2	31 October 2019	1
31 October 2019	1	Walk the Sky	Alter Bridge	4	31 October 2019	1
31 October 2019	1	The Underrated Youth (EP)	Yungblud	6	31 October 2019	1
31 October 2019	2	Halfway to Paradise	Daniel O'Donnell	8	31 October 2019	1
7 November 2019	2	Kind	Stereophonics	1	7 November 2019	1
7 November 2019	2	Jesus Is King	Kanye West	2	7 November 2019	1
7 November 2019	1	Once Upon a Mind	James Blunt	3	7 November 2019	1
7 November 2019	1	The Best of Me	Rick Astley	4	7 November 2019	1
7 November 2019	1	Pony	Rex Orange County	5	7 November 2019	1
14 November 2019	2	From Out of Nowhere	Jeff Lynne's ELO	1	14 November 2019	1
14 November 2019	2	Kiwanuka	Michael Kiwanuka	2	14 November 2019	1
14 November 2019	1	Revenge is Sweet	Krept and Konan	5	14 November 2019	1
14 November 2019	1	The Bootleg Series Vol. 15: Travelin' Thru, 1967–1969	Bob Dylan	6	14 November 2019	1
14 November 2019	1	Back in Harmony	Aled Jones & Russell Watson	7	14 November 2019	1
21 November 2019	1	Sunsets & Full Moons	The Script	1	21 November 2019	1
21 November 2019	9	Back Together	Michael Ball & Alfie Boe	2	21 November 2019	1
21 November 2019	1	Reworked	Snow Patrol	3	21 November 2019	1
21 November 2019	1	Ghosteen	Nick Cave and the Bad Seeds	4	21 November 2019	1
21 November 2019	1	Blue Eyed Soul	Simply Red	6	21 November 2019	1
28 November 2019	4	Spectrum	Westlife	1	28 November 2019	1
28 November 2019	1	Courage	Celine Dion	2	28 November 2019	1
28 November 2019	1	Odyssey: Greatest Hits Live	Take That	5	28 November 2019	1
28 November 2019	1	Kidz Bop 2020	Kidz Bop Kids	7	28 November 2019	1
28 November 2019	1	Here's to Christmas	Chris Kamara	8	28 November 2019	1
28 November 2019	1	Last Christmas: Original Soundtrack	George Michael & Wham!	9	28 November 2019	1
28 November 2019	1	Chixtape 5	Tory Lanez	10	28 November 2019	1
5 December 2019	7	Everyday Life	Coldplay	1	5 December 2019	1
5 December 2019	5	The Christmas Present	Robbie Williams	1	12 December 2019	1
5 December 2019	8	You're in My Heart: Rod Stewart with the Royal Philharmonic Orchestra (#10)	Rod Stewart with the Royal Philharmonic Orchestra	1	19 December 2019	3
5 December 2019	3	Happy Days	André Rieu & the Johann Strauss Orchestra	6	5 December 2019	2
5 December 2019	1	Thanks for the Dance	Leonard Cohen	7	5 December 2019	1
5 December 2019	2	Bing at Christmas	Bing Crosby with the London Symphony Orchestra	9	5 December 2019	2
19 December 2019	2	Who	The Who	3	19 December 2019	1
26 December 2019	15	Heavy Is the Head ♦	Stormzy	1	16 January 2020	1
26 December 2019	57	Fine Line ♦	Harry Styles	2	14 January 2021	1

== Entries by artist ==
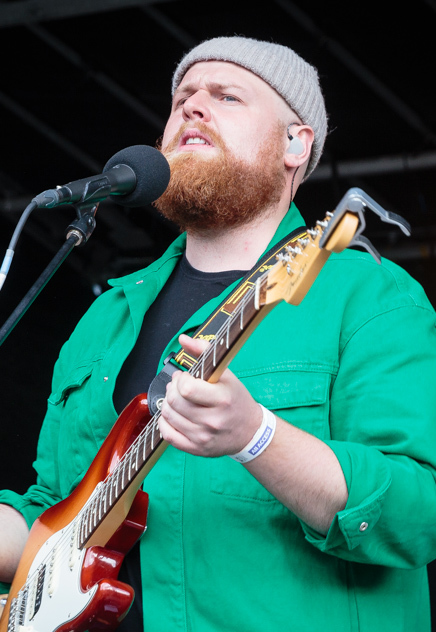
Glasgow-born singer-songwriter Tom Walker reached number-one in March with his debut album What a Time to Be Alive, which spent a total of 14 non-consecutive weeks in the UK top 10.

The following table shows artists who have achieved two or more top 10 entries in 2019, including albums that reached their peak in 2018. The figures only include main artists, with featured artists and appearances on compilation albums not counted individually for each artist. The total number of weeks an artist spent in the top ten in 2019 is also shown.

Entries	Artist	Weeks	Albums
3	The Royal Philharmonic Orchestra ^{[N]}	7	Carpenters with the Royal Philharmonic Orchestra, Unchained Melodies, You're in My Heart: Rod Stewart with the Royal Philharmonic Orchestra
2	D-Block Europe	5	Home Alone, PTSD
2	Ed Sheeran ^{[M]}	24	÷, No.6 Collaborations Project
2	Foals	3	Everything Not Saved Will Be Lost – Part 1, Everything Not Saved Will Be Lost – Part 2
2	Liam Gallagher	5	Definitely Maybe, Why Me? Why Not.
2	Michael Bublé ^{[N]}	4	Christmas, Love
2	Queen ^{[N]}	36	Bohemian Rhapsody: The Original Soundtrack, The Platinum Collection

== Notes ==
- ^{a} Divide re-entered the top 10 at number 10 on 24 January 2019 (week ending). It re-entered the top 10 again at number 8 on 23 May 2019 (week ending).
- ^{b} Dua Lipa re-entered the top 10 at number 9 on 24 January 2019 (week ending).
- ^{c} Mamma Mia! Here We Go Again: The Movie Soundtrack re-entered the top 10 at number 9 on 10 January 2019 (week ending) for 3 weeks.
- ^{d} Always In Between re-entered the top 10 at number 7 on 10 January 2019 (week ending) for 5 weeks, at number 10 on 21 February 2019 (week ending) and at number 7 on 7 March 2019 (week ending).
- ^{e} Bohemian Rhapsody re-entered the top 10 at number 9 on 3 January 2019 (week ending) for 5 weeks (as of 21 February 2019 week ending).
- ^{f} The Platinum Collection originally peaked outside the top 10 at number 63 upon its initial release in 2000. It charted in the top 10 for the first time in 2002, peaking at number 2. It re-entered the top 10 at number 10 on 17 January 2019 (week ending) and the same position on 31 January 2019 (week ending). It re-entered again at number 9 on 21 February 2019 (week ending) for 3 weeks (as of 7 March 2019, week ending).
- ^{g} A Brief Inquiry Into Online Relationships re-entered the top 10 at number 10 on 7 March 2019 (week ending).
- ^{h} Carpenters with the Royal Philharmonic Orchestra re-entered the top 10 at number 10 on 4 April 2019 (week ending).
- ^{i} Thank U, Next re-entered the top 10 at number 9 on 2 May 2019 (week ending) and at number 10 on 16 May 2019 (week ending) for 2 weeks.
- ^{j} Hurts 2B Human re-entered the top 10 at number 9 on 4 July 2019 (week ending).
- ^{k} Diamonds originally peaked at number 5 on its initial release in 2017.
- ^{l} Direct Hits originally peaked at number 6 on its initial release in 2013.
- ^{m} Figure includes album that peaked in 2017.
- ^{n} Figure includes album that peaked in 2018.

== See also ==
- 2019 in British music
- List of UK Albums Chart number ones of the 2010s
