= Alex Winston =

American singer and song writer from Michigan

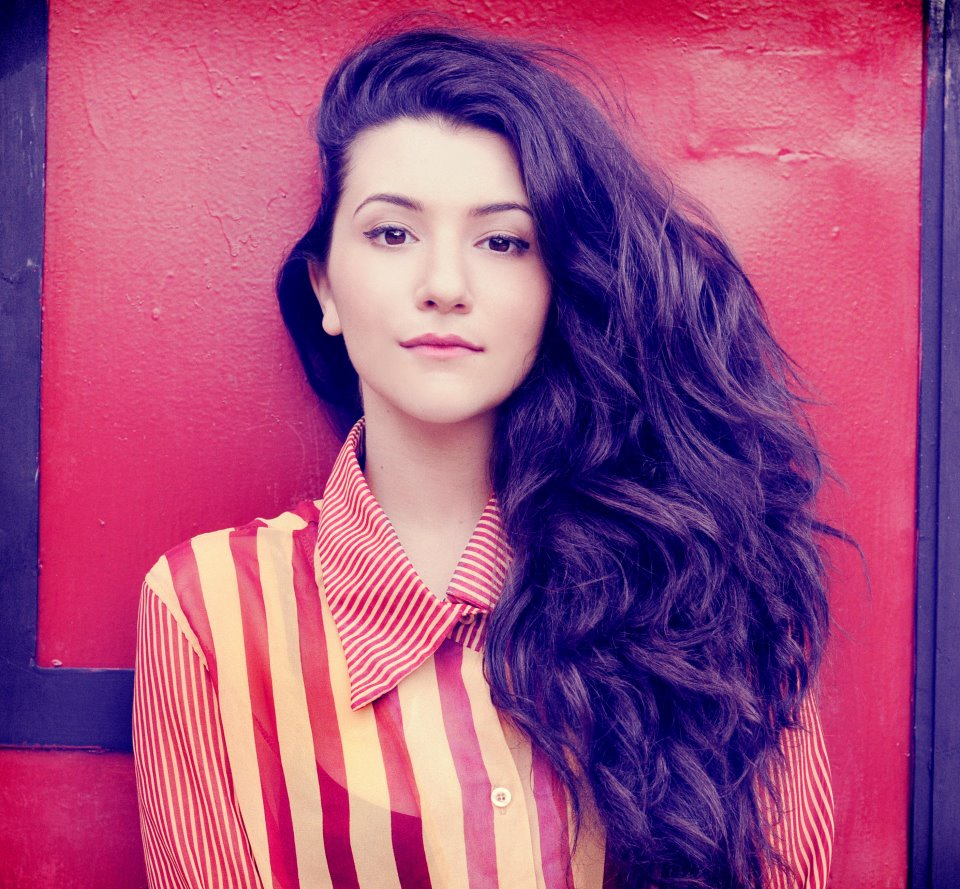

Background information
- Born: Alexandra Leigh Winston; 28 September 1987 (age 38); Bloomfield Hills, Michigan, United States
- Genres: Pop, Indie
- Occupation: Musician
- Instruments: Vocals, guitar, piano
- Years active: 2007 - present
- Labels: Heavy Roc Music; Island Records; V2/CoOp; Rat Rizzo Records

Alexandra Leigh Winston (born September 28, 1987) is an American indie pop rock singer-songwriter and multi-instrumentalist from Bloomfield Hills, Michigan.

== Biography ==
Alex Winston grew up just outside Detroit. She is classically trained as an opera singer, and a self-taught guitarist, songwriter, and pianist. Winston moved to New York City in 2010, where she began performing as both a solo artist and with bands.

Working with the production duo The Knocks, Winston released her first EP, The Basement Covers, on independent label Heavy Roc Music later that year. Recorded in GarageBand, the EP received significant attention, particularly in the UK, where Winston was often compared to Kate Bush, Joanna Newsom, and PJ Harvey. In reviewing the record, The Guardian noted that "there hasn't really been a breakthrough US female from what you might call the alternative/Pitchfork camp, but Alex Winston stands a better chance than most."

Two singles, "Choice Notes" (2010) and "Locomotive" (2011) were released and a music video was made for the latter. These two songs would later appear on the Sister Wife EP, released in February 2011. In 2011, Winston signed with Island Records, and subsequently re-released The Sister Wife EP as well as a collection of Sister Wife remixes. Winston's debut album, King Con, came out on V2 Cooperative Music, a Universal imprint. The album was produced by Charlie Hugall (Florence and the Machine, Ed Sheeran, Crystal Fighters), Bjorn Yttling (Lykke Li), and The Knocks.

"Choice Notes" was used as the music bed for a European and UK advertisement for the Hyundai ix20 and in an ad for TJ Maxx. Winston's 2011 track, "Velvet Elvis" was used as the background music to the Google Chrome advert entitled Julie Deane. She has performed extensively in the US and in Europe, where she supported Edward Sharpe and the Magnetic Zeros and Gotye, among others. She has also played at UK festivals including Bestival, VFest, and the Underage Festival.

Winston released the single "101 Vultures" on her own Rat Rizzo Records imprint in September 2013.

In 2015, Winston released The Day I Died EP on 300 Entertainment.

On September 29, 2017, it was announced via Twitter that Winston had embarked on a new pop project entitled Post Precious with Max Hershenow of MS MR. The duo released their Crown EP on July 13, 2018.

Winston released the single, "Tourist," her first solo music in three years, on August 7, 2018.

Winston's second album, Bingo!, released on July 23, 2024.

== Discography ==
=== EPs ===
- By the Roots (Pratdal, 2007)
- The Basement Covers EP (Heavy Roc Music, 2010)
- Sister Wife (Heavy Roc Music, 2011; Island Records, 2011)
- Sister Wife (The Remixes) (Island Records, 2011)
- Velvet Elvis (Heavy Roc Music, 2011)
- The Day I Died (300 Entertainment, 2015)

=== Albums ===
- King Con (V2/Cooperative Music, 2012)
- Bingo! (2024)

=== Singles ===
- "Choice Notes" (2010)
- "Animal Baby" (2010)
- "Velvet Elvis" (2011)
- "Sister Wife" (2011)
- "Locomotive" (2011)
- "101 Vultures" (2013)
- "Careless" (2014)
- "We Got Nothing" (2015)
- "The Day I Died" (2015)
- "Tourist" (2018)
- “Miss U 1000000” (2019)
- “Wash” (2019)
- "Watching Him Fade Away" (2023)

=== Other songs ===
- "Pet Sematary" (2010)
- "Medicine" (2011)
- "Pretend It's Love" (The Postelles featuring Alex Winston) (2013)
