= Where the Heaven Are We =

Studio album by Swim Deep
- Released: 5 August 2013
- Recorded: 2012
- Genre: Indie pop, dream pop
- Length: 41:11
- Label: Chess Club/RCA
- Producer: Charlie Hugall

Swim Deep chronology
Sun on My Back (2013)	Where the Heaven Are We (2013)	Mothers (2015)

Singles from Where the Heaven Are We
- 1. "Honey" Released: 2 November 2012; 2. "The Sea" Released: 1 March 2013; 3. "She Changes the Weather" Released: 5 May 2013; 4. "King City" Released: 22 July 2013

Where the Heaven Are We is the debut studio album by British indie rock band Swim Deep, released on 5 August 2013 on Chess Club Records, a subsidiary of RCA. It peaked at number 20 in the UK album charts and received mostly positive reviews.

Two years before releasing the album, Swim Deep released their first demos on the internet before signing with Chess Club. Where the Heaven Are We was produced by Charlie Hugall and recorded in Brussels near the end of 2012.

== Background ==
Swim Deep was formed in 2011 by Austin Williams, Tom Higgins, and Wolfgang J. Harte. Williams and Higgins met in Morrisons, where they both worked. A year later, the two of them moved to Birmingham and met the rest of the band at parties. The band struggled with multiple drummers until they finally recruited Austin's friend, Zachary Robinson, who, at the time, played in a band called Cajole Cajole. On the subject, Austin said, "We thought it was a long shot, but we’d just lost another drummer, so we asked Zach if he wanted to join our band, and he said yeah. That was one of the best things that happened, to be honest." After a few months, Harte announced that he was leaving the band, making the band a three-piece. They recruited Cavan McCarthy, a merchandise seller from another Birmingham band, Peace. Williams compared asking people to join the band to dating, as they both require the same process of being nervous before asking the question and that members can leave too. He also claimed he wants to have "a massive influence on pop music".

In early 2013, Where the Heaven Are We was announced, with its release date set for 29 July 2013. Before the release of Where the Heaven Are We, Swim Deep went to the United States and performed with The Homophones and Fantastic Imagination.

In May, two months prior to the release of Where the Heaven Are We, an EP, Sun on My Back, was released in Japan only. Sun on My Back is composed of early demos, B-sides, and "King City".

== Recording ==
Swim Deep recorded Where the Heaven Are We with producer Charlie Hugall, who has also worked with Florence and the Machine. The band first uploaded a few demos on SoundCloud, "Isla Vista" and "Santa Maria", in 2011. Then in 2012, Swim Deep signed with Chess Club and released their debut single, "King City", in May 2012. After a UK tour with Spector in November/December 2012, the band went to Brussels to record Where the Heaven Are We.

== Release ==
In March, "She Changes the Weather" was released on 7" vinyl and digital download. The album was released on standard 12" vinyl, standard CD, deluxe CD (with a DVD), signed deluxe CD, digital download and limited signed vinyl. In July 2013, it was revealed that the deluxe edition would feature a bonus track, "Crush".

In June, the band released a new video for the re-release of "King City". The single was later released in July.

== Reception ==
Professional ratings
Aggregate scores
Source	Rating
Metacritic	72/100
Review scores
Source	Rating
AllMusic	4/5 stars
Clash	8/10
DIY	8/10
Drowned in Sound	6/10
The Guardian	3/5 stars
Mojo	3/5 stars
musicOMH	3.5/5 stars
NME	6/10
The Observer	2/5 stars
Q	4/5 stars
Uncut	7/10

Where the Heaven Are We has a Metacritic score of 72, indicating "generally favorable reviews". Praise was generally directed towards the album's sound, the 90s style, and the singles, while criticisms were often towards the album's flow and the later tracks.

Matt Collar of AllMusic said the band personified the best of 80s and 90s dream pop with "utterly infectious indie pop cuts". Clash's Cai Trefor praised the album and was hopeful for the band's future, saying "a debut album as accomplished and hit-laden as this makes it hard to see the band faltering". John Murphy of musicOMH described the album as "blissful" and "summery". Q's review said that "it's the overall sense of joie de vivre which makes Where the Heaven Are We such a triumph". El Hunt of DIY described the album as "cherry-picked nostalgia with a shimmering polish; fit for the more-hip-than-thou connoisseurs and the eager radio consumer alike".

In a more mixed review, Robert Leedham of Drowned in Sound said that the album "falls short a tad too often". Leedham praised such songs as "Honey", "King City", and "The Sea", but deemed "Red Lips I Know", "Soul Trippin", and "Stray" to be "pleasantly forgettable". NME's Barry Nicolson criticized the album's "lack of dynamism", but praised "She Changes The Weather" and hoped it would indicated a "more expansive, ambitious sound" to come. The Observer's Phil Mongredien praised King City but called the remainder of the album "utterly unremarkable filler".

== Track listing ==
All tracks are written by Austin Williams, except where noted

No.	Title	Writer(s)	Length
1.	"Intro"	Williams, Tom Higgins	1:15
2.	"Francisco"		4:08
3.	"King City"		4:19
4.	"Honey"	Williams, Zachary Robinson	3:39
5.	"Colour Your Ways"	Williams, Higgins	3:03
6.	"Make My Sun Shine"		3:45
7.	"The Sea"		3:40
8.	"Red Lips I Know"		3:58
9.	"Soul Trippin"		4:34
10.	"Stray"		4:14
11.	"She Changes the Weather"	Williams, Charlie Hugall	4:36
Total length:			41:11

Bonus tracks
No.	Title	Length
12.	"Crush"	4:06
13.	"King City (II Figures Remix)"	4:40
Total length:		49:57

== Personnel ==
- Austin Williams – vocals, guitar, keyboards, organ, piano, xylophone
- Tom Higgins – guitar, backing vocals
- Cavan McCarthy – bass guitar
- Zachary Robinson – drums, percussion, backing vocals

== Charts ==
Chart (2013)	Peak position
UK Albums Chart	20
