= Swim Deep =

British indie rock band

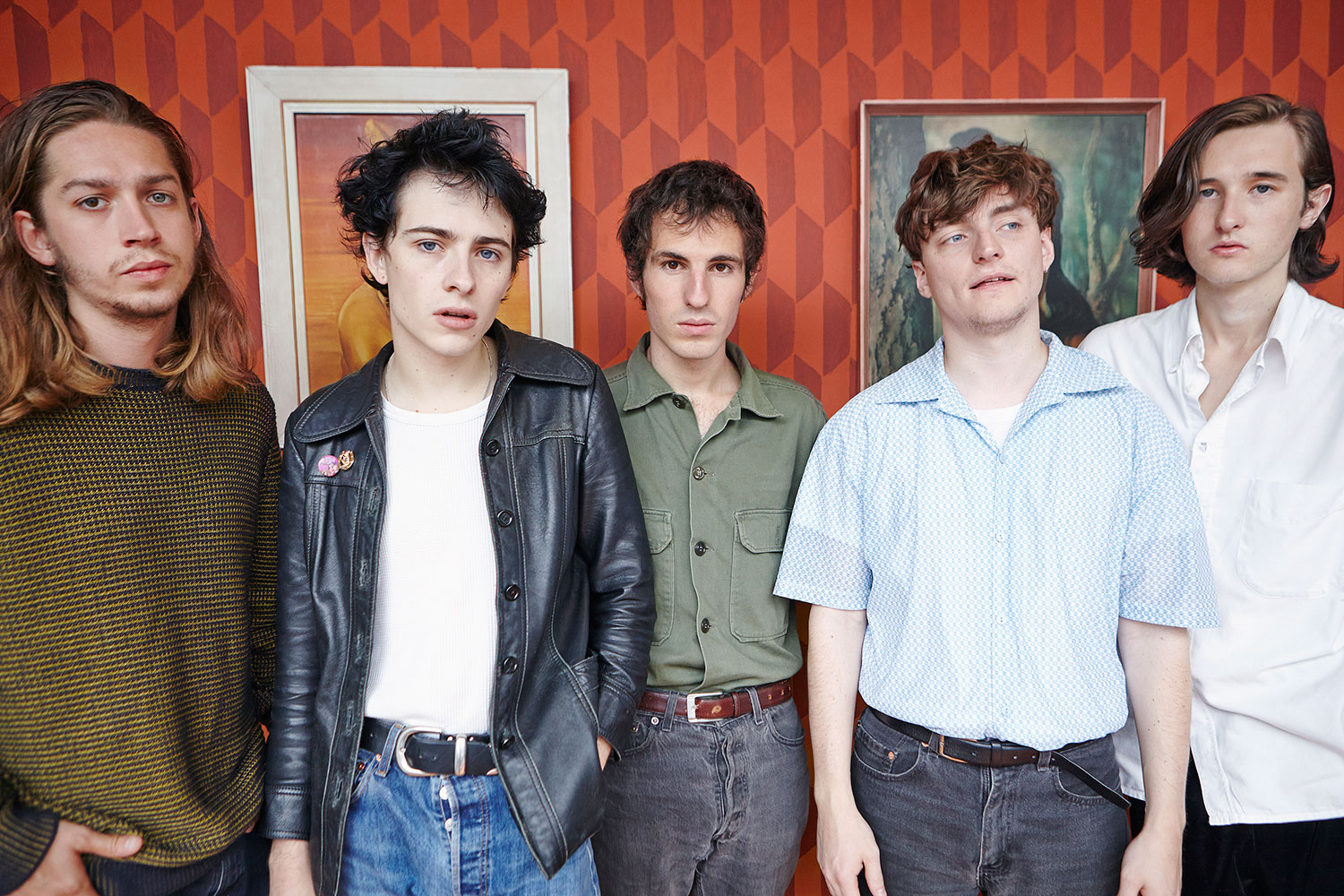
- Swim Deep in 2015/16. Left to right: James Balmont, Zachary Robinson, Austin Williams, Tom Higgins, Cavan McCarthy

Background information
- Origin: Birmingham, England
- Genres: Dream pop; indie pop; shoegaze; psychedelic pop
- Years active: 2011–present
- Label: Chess Club/RCA
- Members: Austin Williams; Cavan McCarthy; James Balmont; Joshua Buchanan; Thomas "Tomaski" Fiquet
- Past members: Wolfgang J. Harte; Zachary Robinson; Tom Higgins; Robbie Wood

Swim Deep are an English indie pop band formed in 2011 in Birmingham. The band currently consists of Austin Williams (vocals), Cavan McCarthy (bass), James Balmont (keyboards), Joshua Buchanan (guitar), and Thomas Fiquet (drums).

Swim Deep were formed in 2011 by Williams, Higgins, and Wolfgang J. Harte. Harte left the band in late 2012 and was replaced by Cavan McCarthy. James Balmont joined the band as a live member in 2013 and became a full member the next year. In 2018, it was confirmed Zachary Robinson (drums) and Tom Higgins (guitar) had left the band ahead of recording their third album. Thomas Fiquet (drums) and Robbie Wood (guitar) joined the band for the recording of their third album, 'Emerald Classics'. Swim Deep have been identified as part of the emerging Digbeth-based B-Town scene.

In late 2012, in Brussels, the band began to record what would later become their debut album, Where the Heaven Are We. Where the Heaven Are We was released on 5 August 2013. The band released their second album, Mothers, on 2 October 2015. After a line-up change, they released their third album, Emerald Classics, on 4 October 2019.

== History ==
=== 2010-2012: Formation and record deal ===
Swim Deep was formed in 2010 by Austin Williams, Tom Higgins, and Wolfgang J. Harte. The band went through multiple drummers until they eventually recruited Zachary Robinson, who, at the time, was playing in a band called Cajole Cajole. On the subject, Austin said, "We thought it was a long shot but we’d just lost another drummer so we asked Zach if he wanted to join our band, that was one of the best things that happened, to be honest." After a few months, Harte announced that he was leaving the band. The band played as a three piece until they recruited Cavan McCarthy, a merchandise seller from a fellow Birmingham band, Peace. The band released two demos, "Isla Vista" and "Santa Maria," on SoundCloud in 2011.

In 2012, Swim Deep signed with Chess Club/RCA and released their debut single, "King City," in May 2012. After a UK tour with Spector in November and December 2012, the band went to Brussels to record their debut album with producer Charlie Hugall. They released their second single, "Honey," in November. NME's review of "Honey" said that "the best bits of the Birmingham mob’s latest cut have the pull of a star-spangled whirlpool that’ll suck you back into the late ’80s."

=== 2013: Where the Heaven Are We ===
Swim Deep performing in Birmingham, 2013

The band accompanied Two Door Cinema Club during their early 2013 UK tour. On 3 February 2013, a video was released for their next single, "The Sea". The single was released the month after on 7" vinyl and download, backed with a cover of "Down by the Seaside". On 10 May 2013, they released their fourth single, "She Changes the Weather", along with an EP of the same name.

On 29 July 2013, Swim Deep's debut album, Where the Heaven Are We, was released. Where The Heaven Are We received mainly positive reviews, with a Metacritic score of 72. NME and The Guardian both rated the album three out of five stars. The Guardian's Michael Hann commented that "Where the Heaven Are We is a pleasant wander through the byways of early-90s indie styles that doesn't ever really assert itself terribly strongly". NME's Barry Nicolson said, "the dreamy, detached sneer of the vocals, the lolloping XXL basslines, all that unwashed hair… Some scenes come roaring out of the traps; B-Town seemed to roll out of bed, insular and uncontrived, smirking at its own in-jokes".

=== 2014-2017: Mothers ===
Following tours throughout 2013 to support their debut album, the band began recording their second album in London in September 2014. In December, they returned to Brussels to continue their progress. They finished recording in January 2015. They released "To My Brother", the first single from the second record, in February. "To My Brother" was noted by critics for its marked change in direction, with many picking up on the unexpected influence of acid house music. Speaking to DIY Magazine, Austin addressed the band's dramatic new direction: "I feel like we’re all shaving our heads and going to war with this record." The second single from the album, "One Great Song and I Could Change the World", was released in April 2015.

In June 2015, the band announced Mothers, their sophomore album, would be released 19 September, but later was delayed until 2 October 2015. Mothers, heavily influenced by acid house and techno, received positive reviews from critics, with a Metacritic score of 79. NME's Rhian Daly described "Namaste" as "a great big bolt of pop that’s impossible to ignore". DIY Magazine's Stephen Ackroyd said that "Fueiho Boogie" "explodes time and time again into increasingly more ridiculous krautrock techno extravaganzas." In December 2015, Swim Deep toured North America with The 1975.

=== 2018-2019: Emerald Classics ===
Swim Deep confirmed they were recording their third album in Margate in June 2018 titled, Emerald Classics, in reference of a pub in Birmingham called The Emerald. The band later announced the departures of long-serving members Zachary Robinson and Tom Higgins in a statement. Captioning a photograph of a new-look Swim Deep on the beach, they said: "We’re off to a studio by the sea to finally finish the album we’ve been dreaming of our whole lives and we’re so ready to share it with you."

They played their first show of the year in Jakarta, Indonesia in September 2018, performing two new songs titled "To Feel Good" and "Sail Away, Say Goodbye". The songs were later included in their third album. They performed their first gig in the UK at Dalston venue Birthdays on 12 September 2018, and later headlined Academy 2 Manchester as part of Neighbourhood Festival. Both UK comeback shows were well-received. The band played their first hometown show in Birmingham for three years on 4 November, playing an in-store show at the Dr Martens store in Birmingham's Bullring shopping centre. In February 2019, they performed a sold-out show at Guildford Boileroom for Independent Venue Week.

The band returned with new single "To Feel Good" in May 2019. They then performed three shows in Birmingham at The Sunflower Lounge as part of a residency in June 2019. On 4 October 2019, they released their third album, Emerald Classics. It was followed by a UK headline tour and a series of shows in Thailand and mainland China.

=== 2020-2023: Familiarise Yourself with Your Closest Exit EP ===
On 5 November 2021, Swim Deep released "On the Floor" which featured singer Phoebe Green. It is the lead single off their collaborative EP, Familiarise Yourself with Your Closest Exit. It was released on 11 March 2022. The EP contains five tracks that featured other artists, Australian singer-songwriter Hatchie and Thai pop duo Dept, as well as Williams' fiancée, Nell Power. Written during lockdown, Williams described the EP as "shoegazey, but like The 1975 [rather than] a '90s throwback".

On 1 September 2022, the band announced a UK headline tour, alongside the release of a stand-alone single, "Little Blue".

=== 2024-present: There's A Big Star Outside and Hum ===
On 7 June 2024 the band released their 4th studio album, There's A Big Star Outside via Submarine Cat Records. The album was produced by Bill Ryder-Jones. Frontman Austin Williams declared the new direction as "a lot more sensitive and a lot more vulnerable".

The band toured the UK, Europe, and Asia in support of the album in 2024 and 2025, including a run of dates in the UK for which Bill Ryder-Jones joined the band as lead guitarist. The latter tour concluded with a performance of the album in full at St. Matthias Church in Hackney, material from which was later released as a vinyl-only live EP.

Swim Deep's fifth album 'Hum' was critically acclaimed, receiving a 9/10 review score in NME.

In February 2026, the band released "Pieces Of You" as the lead single to their album Hum. "I Keep Her Photograph With Me" was then released as the second single in March, with "Mud" and "You, Me & Mary" as the third and fourth previews.

The album was released on 19 June 2026 and received critical acclaim from NME, The Guardian, Dork Magazine and DIY, with journalist Rhian Daly describing it as "a career high full of life and love... [and] undoubtedly the most poignant album in their unpredictable adventure so far." On BBC Radio 2 the following month, The Killers' Brandon Flowers declared himself a fan, describing 'You, Me & Mary' as something that "reminds me of the music that I love... It's just a band that I appreciate."

== Musical style ==
The band's musical style has been described as "melodic, guitar-based rock that belies the influence of '80s dream pop and '90s shoegaze." The band's debut album featured an indie pop sound, with influences from bands such as Ride and the Stone Roses, as well as from baggy, trip hop and new wave genres. Nevertheless, the band transitioned to a psychedelic pop sound on their second album, Mothers, informed by acid house, Balearic beat, gospel music and Motorik rhythms.

== Members ==
=== Current ===
- Austin "Ozzy" Williams - vocals, guitar, sitar, keyboards, synthesizer, organ, piano, xylophone, percussion (2010–present)
- Cavan "Cav" McCarthy - bass guitar, keyboard, synthesizer, backing vocals (2012–present)
- James Balmont - keyboards, synthesizer, keytar, piano, percussion, backing vocals (2013–present)
- Joshua Buchanan - guitar, keyboard, backing vocals (2025–present)
- Thomas "Tomaski" Fiquet - drums, backing vocals (2018–present)

=== Former ===
- James "Wolfgang" Harte - bass guitar, backing vocals (2010–2012)
- Tom "Higgy Pop" Higgins - guitar, keyboard, synthesizer, backing vocals (2010–2018)
- Zachary "Zach" Robinson - drums, percussion, keyboard, synthesizer, backing vocals (2011–2018)
- Johnny Aries - keyboards (2013) (touring member)
- Robbie Wood - guitar, keyboard, backing vocals (2018–2025)

== Discography ==
=== Albums ===
Year	Title	UK Albums Chart
2013	Where the Heaven Are We: Released: 5 August 2013; Format: CD, LP, and digital download	20
2015	Mothers: Released: 2 October 2015; Format: CD, LP, and digital download	55
2019	Emerald Classics: Released: 4 October 2019; Format: CD, LP, cassette, digital download	—
2024	There's a Big Star Outside: Released: 7 June 2024; Format: CD, LP, cassette, digital download	—
2026	Hum: Released: 19 June 2026; Format: CD, LP, cassette, digital download	TBA

=== EPs ===
Year	Title
2013	She Changes the Weather: Released: 10 May 2013; Format: CD, digital download
2013	Sun on My Back: Released: 15 May 2013; Format: CD; Released in Japan Only
2022	Familiarise Yourself with Your Closest Exit: Released: 11 March 2022; Format: LP, digital download

=== Singles ===
Title	Year	Album
"King City"	2012	Where the Heaven Are We
"Honey"	2012	Where the Heaven Are We
"The Sea"	2013	Where the Heaven Are We
"She Changes the Weather"	2013	Where the Heaven Are We
"King City" (re-release)	2013	Where the Heaven Are We
"To My Brother"	2015	Mothers
"One Great Song and I Could Change the World"	2015	Mothers
"Grand Affection"	2015	Mothers
"Namaste"	2015	Mothers
"To Feel Good"	2019	Emerald Classics
"Sail Away, Say Goodbye"	2019	Emerald Classics
"Happy as Larrie (Edit)"	2020	Emerald Classics
"On the Floor" (featuring Phoebe Green)	2021	Familiarise Yourself with Your Closest Exit EP
"Worlds Unluckiest Guy" (featuring Hatchie)	2022	Familiarise Yourself with Your Closest Exit EP
"Big Green Apple" (featuring Nell Power)	2022	Familiarise Yourself with Your Closest Exit EP
"Good News" (featuring Dept)	2022	Familiarise Yourself with Your Closest Exit EP
"Little Blue"	2022	Non-album single
