= King City (song) =

- 2013 re-release cover.

Single by Swim Deep

from the album Where the Heaven Are We
- B-side: "King City (Stripped Session)"
- Released: 14 May 2012
- Recorded: 2012
- Genre: Indie pop, dream pop
- Length: 4:18
- Label: Chess Club
- Songwriter(s): Swim Deep
- Producer(s): Charlie Hugall

Swim Deep singles chronology
"King City" (2012)	"Honey" (2012)

"King City" is the debut single by indie pop band Swim Deep, released in May 2012 through Chess Club Records. It was re-released in July 2013 for their debut album Where the Heaven Are We.

== Release ==
"King City" was originally released on 14 May 2012, backed with "Beach Justice". For the release of Where the Heaven Are We, they re-released "King City", again, on seven-inch vinyl, backed with a stripped version of the song. iTunes made the single their single of the week in August and it was available as a free download.

== Music videos ==
A video for "King City" was made to promote the single. It features Swim Deep wandering about their hometown, directed by The Marshall Darlings. For the re-release of the single, a new video was made which features the band driving about in the desert. The video ends with the band going to the sea back in Birmingham.

== Track listing ==
2012 single

1. King City
2. Beach Justice

2013 single

1. King City
2. King City (Stripped version)

== Release history ==
Region	Date	Format(s)
UK	14 May 2012	7-inch single
UK	29 July 2013	7-inch single, digital download
