= A Real Labour of Love =

Studio album by UB40 featuring Ali, Astro and Mickey
- Released: 2 March 2018
- Recorded: 2017
- Genre: Reggae
- Length: 72:39
- Label: Universal
- Producer: Ali Campbell

UB40 featuring Ali, Astro and Mickey chronology
Getting Over the Storm (2013)	A Real Labour of Love (2018)	For the Many (2019)

A Real Labour of Love is the second studio album by UB40 featuring Ali, Astro and Mickey. It peaked at number 2 on the UK Albums Chart, making it the highest-charting UB40 album since Promises and Lies, which reached number-one in 1993.

== Background ==
In 2008, Ali Campbell unceremoniously quit UB40 after 30 years as their lead singer; he was soon followed by founding member, keyboardist Mickey Virtue. Trumpeter and toaster Astro left the band in 2013. In August 2014, Campbell announced that the trio had reunited to record a new album, Silhouette, under the name "The Legendary Voice of UB40 Ali Campbell reunited with Astro & Mickey". He said of his brother Duncan's singing, "I sat back for five years and watched my brother Duncan murdering my songs. We're saving the legacy". They record under the name 'UB40 featuring Ali, Astro and Mickey' after legal action preventing them from calling the band UB40.

Their first release was The Hits of UB40 Live in 2015. In 2016, their Unplugged album reached number 17 on the UK Albums Chart.

A Real Labour of Love was released in March 2018, an album much in the vein of UB40's Labour of Love series of albums. It reached number two on the UK Albums Chart, and entered the Billboard Reggae Albums chart at number one.

== Track listing ==
1. "Making Love" (Lou Ragland, Norman E. Scott) – 4:13
2. "She Loves Me Now" (Willie Lindo) – 4:31
3. "Strive" (Edmund Carl Aiken, Jr.) – 4:42
4. "Here I Come" (Barrington Levy) – 3:41
5. "Telephone Love / Rumours" (Medley) (Pt.1 - Carlton Hines, Mikey Bennett, Hopeton Lindo, Pt. 2 - Hines) – 7:52
6. "How Could I Leave" (Dennis Brown) – 6:01
7. "Ebony Eyes" (Thom Bell, Linda Creed) – 3:39
8. "Hush Darling" (Gregory Isaacs) – 4:41
9. "Hard Times" (Pablo Gad, Jeb Loy Nichols) – 4:42
10. "Moving Away" (Ken Boothe) – 3:35
11. "International Herb" (Joseph Hill) – 3:23
12. "A Place in the Sun" (Ronald Miller, Bryan Wells) – 4:51
13. "Tune In" (Calvin Scott) – 4:21
14. "Once Ago" (Isaacs) – 3:45
15. "In the Rain" (Anthony Hester) – 4:13
16. "Under Me Sleng Teng" (Ian Smith, Lloyd James, Noel Davey) – 4:23

== Personnel ==
- Astro – vocals
- Ali Campbell – lead vocals, rhythm guitar
- Don Chandler – bass
- Winston Delandro – lead guitar, rhythm guitar
- Colin Graham – trumpet
- Matthew Hoy – backing vocals
- John Johnson – trombone
- Michael Martin – keyboards
- Winston Rose – saxophone
- Paul Slowley – drums
- Mickey Virtue – keyboards

== Charts ==
Chart (2018)	Peak position
Belgian Albums (Ultratop Flanders)	152
Belgian Albums (Ultratop Wallonia)	199
Dutch Albums (Album Top 100)	67
Scottish Albums (Official Charts)	4
UK Albums (Official Charts)	2
UK Album Downloads (Official Charts)	5
US Reggae Albums (Billboard)	1
