= Mothers (album) =

Studio album by Swim Deep
- Released: 2 October 2015
- Recorded: 2014–2015
- Genre: Psychedelic pop, krautrock, indie rock
- Length: 51:38
- Label: RCA

Swim Deep chronology
Where the Heaven Are We (2013)	Mothers (2015)	Emerald Classics (2019)

Singles from Mothers
- 1. "To My Brother" Released: 9 February 2015; 2. "One Great Song and I Could Change the World" Released: 30 April 2015; 3. "Grand Affection" Released: 19 June 2015; 4. "Namaste" Released: 12 August 2015

Mothers is the second studio album by British indie rock band Swim Deep. It was released on 2 October 2015 on Chess Club Records, a subsidiary of RCA. Following the success of their debut album, Where the Heaven Are We, Swim Deep began to record Mothers in London and Brussels in late 2014. Mothers was originally scheduled for release on 19 September 2015 but was pushed back until 2 October.

Mothers peaked at number 55 on the U.K. charts and received generally positive reviews.

== Singles ==
The lead single from the album, "To My Brother", was released on 9 February 2015. "To My Brother" was noted for its more psychedelic style than previous Swim Deep music and its acid house influences. Andy Baber of musicOMH described the song as "a blissful slice of psychedelic pop that nods to heavily towards the late ‘80s and early ‘90s and, in particular, Primal Scream’s Screamadelica".

The second single, "One Great Song and I Could Change the World", was released on 30 April and is featured on the soundtrack for football video game FIFA 16.

The third single, "Grand Affection", was debuted at NME Sounds of the Summer on 19 June.

The fourth single, "Namaste", was released on 12 August. Rhian Daly of NME described "Namaste" as "a great big bolt of pop that’s impossible to ignore".

== Musical style ==
Mothers was noted for its distinctly different style in comparison with Where the Heaven Are We. Speaking to DIY, lead singer Austin Williams addressed the band's new direction, saying, "I feel like we’re all shaving our heads and going to war with this record." Andy Baber of musicOMH wrote, "It is clear the new five-piece had a lot of fun experimenting with their sound and it is a drastic departure from Where The Heaven Are We." Tshepo Mokoena of The Guardian wrote the band "ditched the loose and baggy guitar pop of 2013’s Where the Heaven Are We? in favour of psych-pop that contorts itself into pulsing Balearic acid house and motorik rhythms." DIY's Stephen Ackroyd said "Fueiho Boogie", the album's final track, "explodes time and time again into increasingly more ridiculous krautrock techno extravaganzas".

== Reception ==
Professional ratings
Aggregate scores
Source	Rating
Metacritic	79/100
Review scores
Source	Rating
AllMusic	4/5 stars
DIY	5/5 stars
Drowned in Sound	7/10
The Guardian	4/5 stars
The Line of Best Fit	7.5/10
musicOMH	3/5 stars
NME	4/5 stars
Q	3/5 stars

At review aggregate site Metacritic, Mothers has an average score of 79 out of 100, based on 9 reviews, indicating "generally favorable reviews".

Mokoena called the album "a playful and boldly curious return". Ackroyd described the album as "brave, fresh, exciting", while writing "it works spectacularly". Ackroyd also praised the band's confidence, describing the album as "delivered with the swagger of someone who’s just half-inched Joseph’s Technicolor Dreamcoat". Q's review stated "Mothers marks this once unremarkable band as real contenders."

In a more mixed review, Baber praised "To My Brother" and "One Great Song and I Could Change the World", but likened "Grand Affection" to "a theme tune for a terrible ‘80s video game" and called "Laniakea" "just plain irritating". Baber wrote Mothers lacked moments that stood out, calling the record "a case of close, but not close enough".

== Track listing ==
No.	Title	Writer(s)	Length
1.	"One Great Song and I Could Change the World"	James Balmont; Cavan McCarthy; Zack Robinson; Austin Williams	3:57
2.	"To My Brother"	Balmont; Tom Higgins; Oliver Horton; Williams	3:59
3.	"Green Conduit"	Balmont; Robinson; Williams	4:35
4.	"Heavenly Moment"	Balmont; Robinson; Williams	4:28
5.	"Namaste"	Balmont; Robinson; Williams	3:32
6.	"Is there Anybody Out There"	Balmont; Robinson; Williams	4:30
7.	"Forever Spacemen"	Balmont; Williams	3:49
8.	"Grand Affection"	Balmont; McCarthy; Williams	4:15
9.	"Imagination"	Balmont; Williams	5:54
10.	"Laniakea"	Balmont; Williams	4:27
11.	"Fueiho Boogie"	Balmont; Horton; Robinson; Williams	8:12
Total length:			51:38

Deluxe edition bonus tracks
No.	Title	Length
12.	"Caramelise"	4:44
13.	"Si Si Me Voy"	3:44
14.	"Everything Is Possible"	4:01
15.	"Hotel California"	5:27
Total length:		69:34

== Charts ==
Chart (2015)	Peak position
UK Albums Chart	55
