= You Are Someone Else =

Studio album by Fickle Friends
- Released: 16 March 2018
- Recorded: 2015–2017
- Length: 51:00
- Label: Polydor
- Producer: Mike Crossey; Fickle Friends; Charlie Hugall; Mike Spencer; Jack Wilson

Fickle Friends chronology
Glue EP (2017)	You Are Someone Else (2018)	Weird Years (2021)

Singles from You Are Someone Else
- 1. "Swim" Released: 11 March 2016; 2. "Brooklyn" Released: 3 November 2016; 3. "Hello Hello" Released: 9 March 2017; 4. "Glue" Released: 11 August 2017; 5. "Hard to Be Myself" Released: 12 October 2017; 6. "Wake Me Up" Released: 2 March 2018; 7. "Say No More" Released: 8 June 2018; 8. "Heartbroken" Released: 13 July 2018

You Are Someone Else is the debut studio album by British indie pop collective Fickle Friends. It was released on 16 March 2018 through Polydor Records. The album and single artwork was designed by visual artist Mat Maitland, who worked with the likes of Michael Jackson and Josef Salvat and is the co-creator of the seafox mascot for Galantis.

== Background ==
After the band officially released their debut extended play, entitled Velvet in 2015, which was produced alongside Mike Crossey, they started recording new music with the intention of going in a different direction sonically, but not veering far off from their pop rock roots. In 2016, they released the single "Swim", which was released originally as their debut single back in 2014. The song originally produced solely by the band and was re-produced alongside rising producer and mixing engineer Charlie Hugall. The song was described as going towards an indie pop genre. This was claimed, at the time, to be the official lead single from their upcoming debut album. After, they released a second single, entitled "Crybaby", which re-united them with Mike Crossey. Together they were reported to have worked frequently in the studio working on new music.

Towards the later part of 2016, they released their single "Brooklyn", which became a breakthrough hit. The song classed as them as a whole new kind of indie pop band and critics have claimed the song to be "their compulsively danceable brand of indie-pop", which defined them as a band. The song also achieved countless streams and was advertised and promoted on YouTube. Prior to the release of the song, they embarked on their 2016 headlining tour, which began on 18 November – 1 December 2016.

After the release of the single and into 2017, the band said that Mike Crossey would be the executive producer for their debut album, which was going to be released in 2017.

During the recording of their debut album, the band announced their first single of 2017, entitled "Hello Hello", which was produced alongside Mike Crossey and additionally produced by Crossey's recording engineer Jonathan Gilmore. The song became their second breakthrough hit and was featured in many programme's, such as The Only Way Is Essex. The track was also one of their first singles to be remixed by big names, such as fellow Polydor signee Shura.

In late July 2017, they announced that their album was going to be delayed and revealed that they would like as early as a late 2017 released date. Prior to the announcement, they announced a new single "Glue", which was produced by renowned mixing engineer and house music producer Mark Ralph. The song was announced as the lead single of a three-track extended play also announced under the title Glue. It was released as their second EP in August 2017, to make up for the intended album date. Critics described the EP as "Glue splits up the feel-good sound we’ve heard on previous releases (such as "Brooklyn" and "Hello Hello")" and a "new direction" in which the band now pursues.

In November 2017, the band released a new single, entitled "Hard to Be Myself", which was produced alongside Mike Spencer and said to have worked with new producers on their album, apart from their affiliate Mike Crossey. After, almost a months later, the band announced their debut album, under the title You Are Someone Else and that it was scheduled to be released in March 2018. It was also revealed that their single "Crybaby" was originally going to make the cut on the intended release date, but, because of working with other people during the time, the other tracks made the album and that song did not.

Between the time of the announcement and the album's release, February saw the third re-release and album version of the album's lead single "Swim", which was released onto YouTube as a fan video, filled with fans lip syncing the song. In early March 2018, they released their promotional single "Wake Me Up", which was done so a week prior to the album's release.

== Critical reception ==
One source stated that album brings back some of their hits throughout the years and also experiments on the sound that they have delivered, which has become the Fickle Friends that their fans know and love. It stated, "Fans will be familiar with classic Fickle Friends bangers like ‘Swim’, ‘Hello Hello’ and ‘Say No More’, which are a perfect combination for the warmer spring weather due to their feel-good, summery vibes. But I also anticipate that many will be happy with new hits like ‘Bite’ and ‘She’, which have high-energy electronica influences and highlight lead singer [Natassja]'s flawless, sweet and effortless vocals. Fickle Friends are known for their incredibly catchy and meaningful lyrics and they continue this trend through much of the album."

== Tour ==
You Are Someone Else UK Tour
Date	City	Country	Venue
18 October 2018	Bristol	England	SWX
19 October 2018	London	England	O2 Shepherd's Bush Empire
20 October 2018	Cambridge	England	Junction 1
22 October 2018	Nottingham	England	The Level at Nottingham Trent Students' Union
24 October 2018	Glasgow	Scotland	The Garage
25 October 2018	Newcastle	England	Northumbria Institute
26 October 2018	Birmingham	England	O2 Academy 2
27 October 2018	Manchester	England	Academy 2

== Track listing ==
All tracks are written by Christopher Hall, Jack Harrington, Sam Morris, Natassja Shiner, and Jack Wilson; additional writers indicated below.

You Are Someone Else
No.	Title	Writer(s)	Producer(s)	Length
1.	"Wake Me Up"		Fickle Friends	3:28
2.	"Glue"		Jack Wilson; Mark Ralph^{[c]}	3:08
3.	"Swim"		Fickle Friends; Charlie Hugall	3:17
4.	"Bite"	Mike Crossey	Crossey; Fickle Friends	3:28
5.	"Hard to Be Myself"		Fickle Friends; Mike Spencer; Wilson	3:10
6.	"Lovesick"		Wilson	3:17
7.	"Say No More"	Crossey	Fickle Friends; Crossey	3:27
8.	"Heartbroken"		Wilson	3:32
9.	"In My Head (Ditty)"	Crossey	Fickle Friends; Crossey	2:03
10.	"Rotation"	Crossey	Fickle Friends; Crossey	3:10
11.	"Hello Hello"		Crossey; Jonathan Gilmore^{[a]}	2:57
12.	"Paris"	Crossey	Fickle Friends; Crossey	2:42
13.	"Brooklyn"	Crossey; Jonny Wright	Fickle Friends; Crossey	3:08
14.	"Midnight"	Crossey	Fickle Friends; Crossey	3:21
15.	"She"		Fickle Friends; Hugall	3:16
16.	"Useless"		Fickle Friends; Crossey	3:29
Total length:				51:00

Notes

- ^{^[c]} signifies a co-producer
- ^{^[a]} signifies an assistant producer

== Personnel ==
Fickle Friends

- Christopher Hall – guitar (all tracks), mixing (13)
- Jack Harrington – bass guitar (all tracks), vocals (1, 2, 4, 6–10, 12–14, 16), background vocals (5, 11); keyboards, mixing (13)
- Sam Morris – drums (all tracks), mixing (13)
- Natassja Shiner – vocals (all tracks), keyboards (11, 13), mixing (13)
- Jack Wilson – keyboards (all tracks), vocals (1–4, 6–16), samples (3, 11), background vocals (5), engineering (1, 6, 8), mixing (13)

Additional contributors

- Stuart Hawkes – mastering (1–12, 14–16)
- Tom Coyne – mastering (13)
- Mark Ralph – mixing (1–3, 7, 11), engineering (2)
- Charlie Hugall – mixing (4, 15, 16)
- Mike Spencer – mixing, engineering, programming (5)
- Dan Lancaster – mixing (6, 8, 14)
- Mike Crossey – mixing (9, 10, 12)
- Andy Hall Hall – engineering (1, 6, 8, 15)
- Jonathan Gilmore – engineering (4, 7, 9, 10, 12–14, 16)
- Liz Horsman – engineering, programming (5)
- Daniel Alexanders Harris – band photo

== Charts ==
Chart (2018)	Peak position
Scottish Albums (OCC)	9
UK Albums (OCC)	9
