= Carpenters with the Royal Philharmonic Orchestra =

2018 compilation album by the Carpenters

Compilation album by the Carpenters with the Royal Philharmonic Orchestra
- Released: December 7, 2018
- Length: 1:06:36
- Labels: A&M; Universal Music Enterprises
- Producers: Karen Carpenter; Richard Carpenter; Nick Patrick

The Carpenters with the Royal Philharmonic Orchestra chronology
As Time Goes By (2004)	Carpenters with the Royal Philharmonic Orchestra (2018)

Live/compilations chronology
The Nation's Favourite Carpenters Songs (2016)	Carpenters with the Royal Philharmonic Orchestra (2018)

Professional ratings
Review scores
Source	Rating
AllMusic	4/5 stars
The Independent	4/5 stars
The Irish News	9/10

Carpenters with the Royal Philharmonic Orchestra is a compilation album by the American duo the Carpenters. It was released on December 7, 2018, by A&M Records and Universal Music Enterprises. The album features Carpenters' "original vocal and instrumental tracks" accompanied by new orchestral arrangements by the Royal Philharmonic Orchestra. The Japanese release has "Please Mr. Postman" as a bonus track.

Richard Carpenter served as the album's arranger, conductor and co-producer. The Royal Philharmonic recorded its portions at Abbey Road Studio. The album was completed at Capitol Studios in Los Angeles.

== Track listing ==
All tracks arranged by Richard Carpenter; except "I Believe You" arranged by Paul Riser.

No.	Title	Writer(s)	Length
1.	"Overture"	Richard Carpenter, Peter Knight	1:29
2.	"Yesterday Once More"	John Bettis, Richard Carpenter	3:57
3.	"Hurting Each Other"	Gary Geld, Peter Udell	3:58
4.	"Touch Me When We're Dancing"	Ken Bell, Terry Skinner, J.L. Wallace	3:16
5.	"For All We Know"	Arthur James, Fred Karlin, Robb Wilson	2:57
6.	"I Need to Be in Love"	Richard Carpenter, John Bettis, Albert Hammond	4:30
7.	"I Believe You"	Dick Addrisi, Don Addrisi	3:53
8.	"I Just Fall in Love Again"	Steve Dorff, Larry Herbstritt, Harry Lloyd, Gloria Sklerov	5:14
9.	"Merry Christmas, Darling"	Richard Carpenter, Frank Pooler	3:02
10.	"Baby It's You"	Burt Bacharach, Mack David, Barney Williams	3:12
11.	"(They Long to Be) Close to You"	Burt Bacharach, Hal David	3:41
12.	"Superstar"	Bonnie Bramlett, Leon Russell	3:51
13.	"Rainy Days and Mondays"	Roger Nichols, Paul Williams	3:37
14.	"This Masquerade"	Leon Russell	4:51
15.	"Ticket to Ride"	John Lennon, Paul McCartney	4:10
16.	"Goodbye to Love"	John Bettis, Richard Carpenter	3:59
17.	"Top of the World"	John Bettis, Richard Carpenter	2:59
18.	"We've Only Just Begun"	Roger Nichols, Paul Williams	4:00
Total length:			1:06:36

Target and Japanese edition bonus track
No.	Title	Length
19.	"Please Mr. Postman"	2:57

== Personnel ==
- Vocals: Karen Carpenter
- Guitar: Tim May, Tony Peluso. Pedal Steel: Buddy Emmons
- Bass: Joe Osborn
- Keyboards: Richard Carpenter
- Drums: Greg Bissonette, Hal Blaine, Karen Carpenter, Jim Gordon, Larrie Londin, Mike Shapiro, Ron Tutt
- Saxophone: Bob Messenger, Tom Scott
- Harmonica: Tommy Morgan
- Flute: Wayne Bergeron, Bob Messenger, David Shostac
- Oboe: Earl Dumler
- Horns: Wayne Bergeron, David Duke, Earl Dumler, Chuck Findley,
- Backing vocals: Richard Carpenter, Carolyn Dennis, the M.O.R. Chorale, the O.K. Chorale

== Charts ==
Chart (2018–2019)	Peak position
Australian Albums (ARIA)	29
Japanese Albums (Oricon)	25
Scottish Albums (Official Charts)	7
UK Albums (Official Charts)	8
US Top Classical Albums (Billboard)	2
US Top Classical Crossover Albums (Billboard)	2
US Top Album Sales (Billboard)	52

== Certifications ==
Region	Certification	Certified units/sales
United Kingdom (BPI)	Gold	100,000^{‡}
^{‡} Sales+streaming figures based on certification alone.
