= Fickle Friends =

English indie pop band

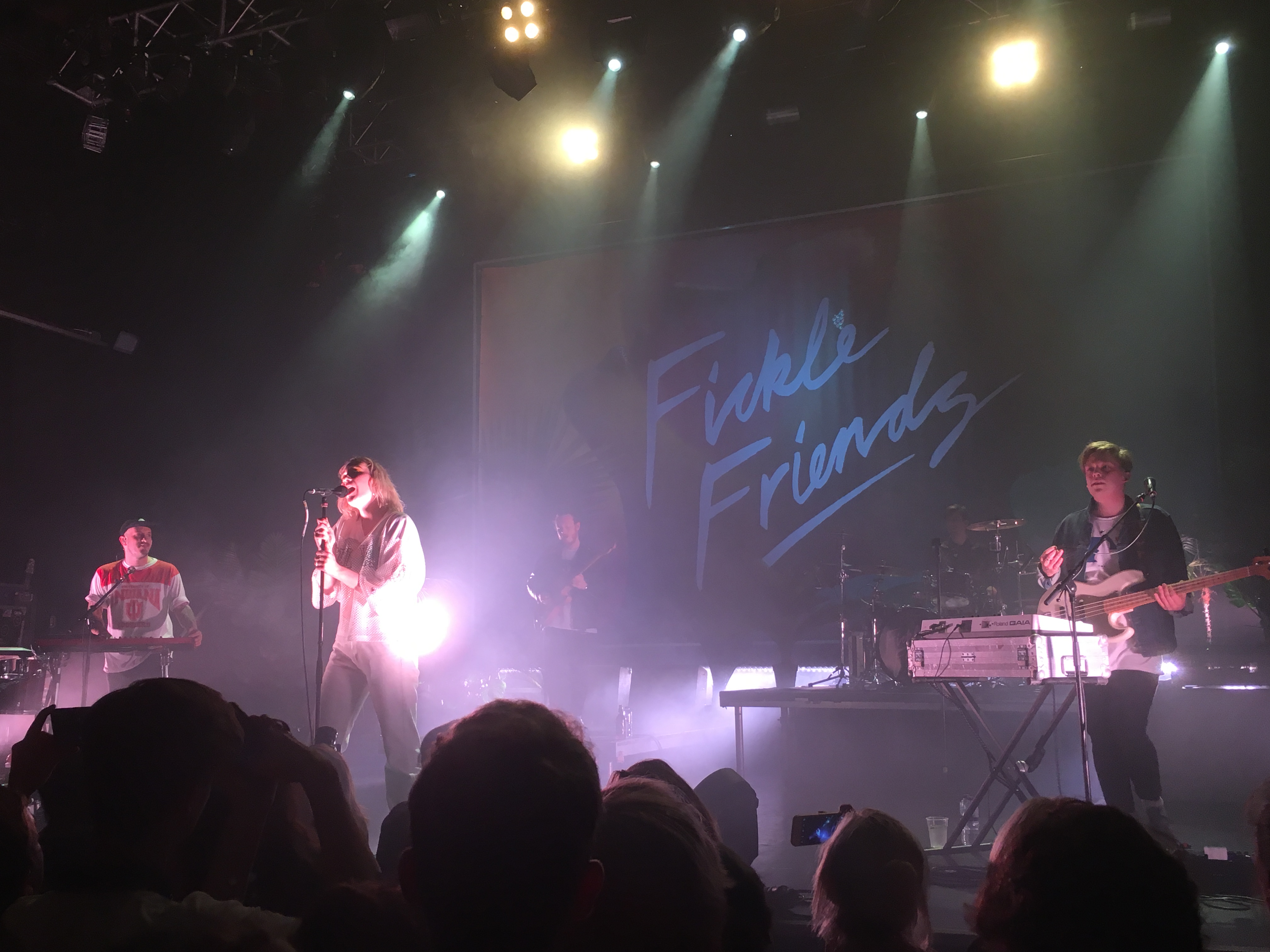

Background information
- Origin: Brighton, East Sussex, England
- Genres: Indie rock, indie pop, synth-pop, alternative rock
- Years active: 2013–present
- Label: Palmeira Music
- Members: Natassja Shiner; Jack Wilson; Harry Herrington; Sam Morris
- Past members: Christopher Hall
- Website: ficklefriends.co.uk

Fickle Friends are an English indie rock band from Brighton, East Sussex, England. The band formed in 2013, and is made up of Natassja Shiner (vocals, keyboard), Harry Herrington (bass, backing vocals), Sam Morris (drums) and Jack Wilson (keyboards). Natassja met Sam at Liverpool Institute for Performing Arts and met Harry, Jack, and former member Chris the following year in BIMM Brighton.

After two years touring the UK and Europe without a label or publisher and playing 53 festivals across 2 years, Fickle Friends signed to Polydor Records. The band recorded their debut album in Los Angeles with Mike Crossey and it was released on 16 March 2018 during a promotional UK tour. Fickle Friends' debut album You Are Someone Else was released on 16 March that year, and entered the UK Albums Chart at No. 9.

== History ==
=== 2013–2015: Formation and touring ===
The band formed in 2013.

They released the single "Swim" early 2014. 31 March they released the single "Play". On 15 September they released their next single "For You".

25 May 2015 they released their first EP Velvet. On 6 October they released the single "Say No More".

=== 2015–2018: You Are Someone Else ===
The band released the single "Cry Baby" on 27 July 2016. On 3 November they released "Brooklyn".

9 March 2017 they released the single "Hello, Hello". On 15 July they released the single "Hard to be Myself". On 11 August they released their next EP Glue. They re-released their single "Swim" on 22 November.

Fickle Friends debut album You are Someone Else a lyric from the single and featured track "Brooklyn" was announced 21 November 2017. Their last single leading up to the albums release was "Wake Me Up" which was released on 2 March 2018.

The album was released on 16 March 2018, reaching a peak place at no. 9 on the UK chart.

On 14 June, the band released You are someone Else: Versions, an EP of variations of tracks from their debut album.

6 September they released the track "Broken Sleep". 5 October they released "The Moment". 9 November they released the final song in this trio EP "San Francisco".

=== 2019–2022: Weird Years and Are We Gonna Be Alright? ===
The Band released new singles: "Amateurs" was released by 18 October 2019, "Pretty Great" was released on 17 January 2020 and "Eats Me Up" was released on 4 March 2020.

Fickle Friends provided a remix of the track "Kelly" by The Aces on 28 August 2020.

On 1 September 2020, they announced the structure and idea for their second studio Album Weird Years. Because they were unable to tour, they released the album in separate EPs or 'Seasons', taking inspiration from television. This was accompanied by the release of the first track of the EP "What a Time" on 4 September. Their second single "92" was released on 16 October. The third and final single "Million" was released on 20 November. The first season was released on 15 January 2021.

The first single from Weird Years Season 2 "Not in the Mood" was released on 30 March 2021. The second single from the EP "Cosmic Coming of Age" was released on 14 April 2021. Weird Years Season 2 was released on 7 May 2021.

On 8 September 2021 they announced their second studio album 'Are We Gonna Be Alright?' and released their first single of the album "Love You To Death". The second single "Alone" was released on 13 October. The third and final single of the album "Yeah, Yeah, Yeah " was released on 19 November.

Fickle Friends released a Christmas single "My Favourite Day" on 1 December.

'Are We Gonna Be Alright?' was released on 14 January.

=== 2023–2024: Hiatus ===
After their second album, the band decided to find time to focus on their mental health.

=== 2024–present: Fickle Friends ===
During July 2024, Fickle Friends teased they had returned to the studio. Soon followed by snippets of three new songs, these would be a part of their third studio album.

Between 31 October 2024 and 2 October 2025, they released 6 tracks from the album as singles. In order, they were:

- "Feral"
- "Dream"
- "Swoon"
- "Happier"
- "UP!"
- "Joe"

Their third studio album, self-titled as "Fickle Friends", was released on 7 November 2025.

== Band members ==
=== Current ===
- Natassja Shiner – vocals, keyboard
- Jack Wilson – keyboard, guitar, backing vocals, samples, programming
- Jack 'Harry' Herrington – bass guitar, backing vocals
- Sam Morris – drums, percussion

=== Former ===
- Christopher Hall – guitar

== Discography ==
=== Studio albums ===
Title	Album details	Peak chart positions
Title	Album details	UK
You Are Someone Else	Released: 16 March 2018; Label: Polydor; Format: CD, LP, Digital, Cassette	9
Are We Gonna Be Alright?	Released: 14 January 2022; Label: Cooking Vinyl; Format: CD, LP, Digital, Cassette	—
Fickle Friends	Released: 7 November 2025; Label: Self-released; Format: CD, LP, Digital, Cassette	—

=== Extended plays ===
List of extended plays
Title	Extended play details
Velvet	Released: 25 May 2015; Label: Polydor; Format: Digital
Glue	Released: 15 August 2017; Label: Polydor; Format: LP, Digital
You Are Someone Else: Versions	Released: 14 June 2018; Label: Polydor; Format: Digital
Broken Sleep	Released: 9 November 2018; Label: Polydor; Format: Digital
Weird Years: Season 1	Released: 15 January 2021; Label: Cooking Vinyl; Format: Digital, LP
Weird Years: Season 2	Released: 7 May 2021; Label: Cooking Vinyl; Format: Digital, Cassette

=== Singles ===
- "Swim" (2014)
- "Play" (2014)
- "For You" (2014)
- "Could Be Wrong" (2015)
- "Say No More" (2015)
- "Swim" (2016)
- "Cry Baby" (2016)
- "Brooklyn" (2016)
- "Hello Hello" (2017)
- "Glue" (2017)
- "Hard to Be Myself" (2017)
- "Swim" (2018) (re-release)
- "Say No More" (2018) (re-release)
- "Heartbroken" (2018) (featuring Amber Run)
- "Broken Sleep" (2018)
- "The Moment" (2018)
- "San Francisco" (2018)
- "Amateurs" (2019)
- "Pretty Great" (2020)
- "Eats Me Up" (2020)
- "What A Time" (2020)
- "92" (2020)
- "Million" (2020)
- "Not in the Mood" (2021)
- "Cosmic Coming of Age" (2021)
- "Love You to Death" (2021)
- "Alone" (2021)
- "Yeah, Yeah, Yeah" (2021)
- "My Favourite Day" (2021)
- "Feral" (2024)
- "Dream" (2024)
- "Swoon" (2025)
- "Happier" (2025)
- "UP!" (2025)
- "Joe" (2025)

=== Music videos ===
Title	Year	Album / EP
"Swim"	2016	n/a
"Cry Baby"	2016	n/a
"Brooklyn"	2016	Album; You Are Someone Else
"Hello Hello"	2017	Album; You Are Someone Else
"Glue"	2017	Album; You Are Someone Else
"Hard to Be Myself"	2017	Album; You Are Someone Else
"Swim" (Fan Video)	2018	Album; You Are Someone Else
"Wake Me Up"	2018	Album; You Are Someone Else
"Say No More"	2018	Album; You Are Someone Else
"Broken Sleep"	2018	EP; Broken Sleep
"The Moment"	2018	EP; Broken Sleep
"San Francisco"	2018	EP; Broken Sleep
"Amateurs" (Lyric Video)	2019	n/a
"Pretty Great"	2020	n/a
"Eats Me Up"	2020	n/a
"What a Time"	2020	EP; Weird Years: Season 1
"92"	2020	EP; Weird Years: Season 1
"Million" (Lyric Video)	2020	EP; Weird Years: Season 1
"IRL"	2021	EP; Weird Years: Season 1
"Finish Line" (Lyric Video)	2021	EP; Weird Years: Season 1
"Cosmic Coming of Age"	2021	EP; Weird Years: Season 2
"Won't Hurt Myself"	2021	EP; Weird Years: Season 2
