= Bombay Bicycle Club discography =

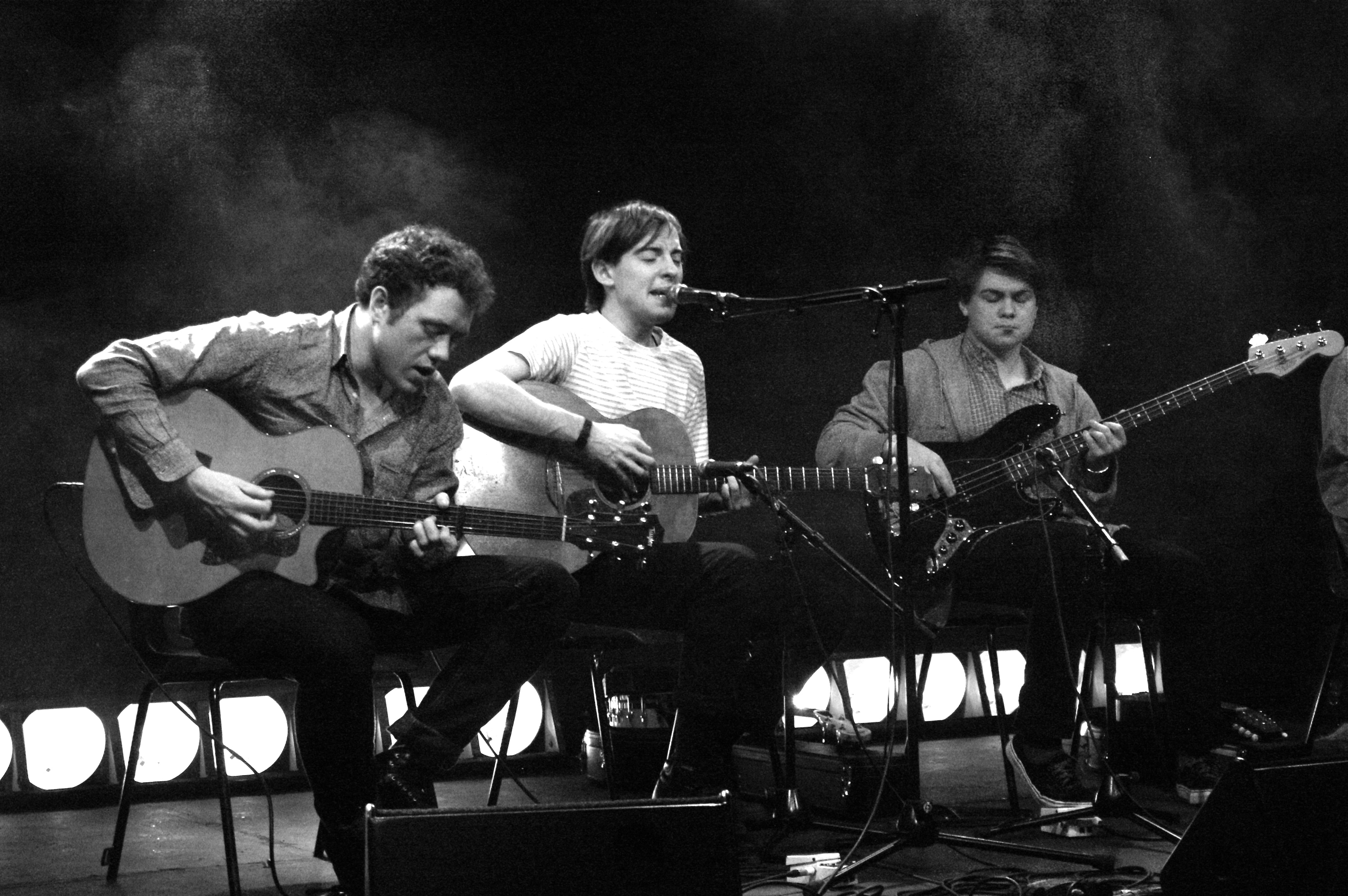
- Studio albums: 6
- EPs: 4
- Singles: 26

English indie rock band Bombay Bicycle Club have released six studio albums, four extended plays and twenty-six singles. Their debut studio album, I Had the Blues But I Shook Them Loose, was released in July 2009 and peaked at number forty-six on the UK Albums Chart. Their second studio album, Flaws, was released in July 2010 and peaked at number eight on the UK Albums Chart. Their third studio album, A Different Kind of Fix, was released in August 2011 and peaked at number six on the UK Albums Chart. Their fourth studio album, So Long, See You Tomorrow, was released in February 2014 and peaked at number one on the UK Albums Chart.

== Albums ==
=== Studio albums ===
Title	Details	Peak chart positions										Certifications
Title	Details	UK	AUS	AUT	BEL (FL)	BEL (WA)	GER	IRL	NLD	SCO	US	Certifications
I Had the Blues But I Shook Them Loose	Released: 3 July 2009; Label: Island; Formats: CD, digital download, LP, streaming	46	—	—	—	—	—	—	— (Note: I Had the Blues But I Shook Them Loose did not enter the Dutch Album Top 100, but entered the Dutch Alternative Top 30 chart at number 14.)	85	—	BPI: Gold
Flaws	Released: 9 July 2010; Label: Island; Formats: CD, digital download, LP, streaming	8	—	—	—	—	—	95	—	14	—	BPI: Gold
A Different Kind of Fix	Released: 26 August 2011; Label: Island; Formats: CD, digital download, LP, streaming	6	— (Note: A Different Kind of Fix did not enter the Australian ARIA Albums Chart but peaked at number nine on the ARIA Hitseekers Chart.)	65	— (Note: A Different Kind of Fix did not enter the Ultratop 200 Albums chart, but peaked at number six on the Flemish Heatseekers chart.)	97	84	18	— (Note: A Different Kind of Fix did not enter the Dutch Album Top 100, but entered the Dutch Alternative Top 30 chart at number 19.)	8	— (Note: A Different Kind of Fix did not enter the US Billboard 200, but peaked at number 22 on the US Heatseekers Albums Chart.)	BPI: Gold
So Long, See You Tomorrow	Released: 3 February 2014; Label: Island; Formats: CD, digital download, LP, streaming	1	36	—	95	130	78	8	74	2	101	BPI: Gold
Everything Else Has Gone Wrong	Released: 17 January 2020; Label: Mmm... Records; Formats: Cassette, CD, digital download, LP, streaming	4	— (Note: Everything Else Has Gone Wrong did not enter the ARIA Albums Chart, but peaked at number 48 on the ARIA Digital Album Chart.)	—	172	—	68	24	—	4	— (Note: Everything Else Has Gone Wrong did not enter the US Billboard 200, but peaked at number 74 on the US Top Current Albums Chart.)	
My Big Day	Released: 20 October 2023; Label: Mmm... Records; Formats: Cassette, CD, digital download, LP, streaming	3	—	—	—	—	—	20	—	2	—	
"—" denotes a recording that did not chart or was not released in that territory.

=== Live albums ===
Title	Details
I Had The Blues But I Shook Them Loose (Live at Brixton)	Released: 11 December 2020; Label: Mmm... Records; Formats: CD, digital download

=== Compilation albums ===
Title	Details
Demos 2004-2008	Released: 3 July 2019; Label: Mmm... Records; Formats: digital download

== Extended plays ==
Title	Details	Peak chart positions		
Title	Details	UK Sales	UK Indie	SCO
The Boy I Used to Be	Released: 12 February 2007; Label: Mmm...Records; Format: Digital Download, Limited Edition 10", CD	—	—	—
How We Are	Released: 29 October 2007; Label: Mmm...Records; Format: Digital Download, Limited Edition 7", CD	54	2	71
iTunes Festival: London 2010	Released: 28 July 2010; Label: Island Records; Format: Digital Download	—	—	—
Two Lives	Released: 24 July 2020; Label: Mmm... Records; Format: Digital Download	—	—	—
Fantasies	Released: 23 February 2024; Label: Mmm... Records; Format: Digital Download, Limited Edition 10"	—	—	—
"—" denotes a recording that did not chart or was not released in that territory.

== Singles ==
=== As lead artist ===
Title	Year	Peak chart positions										Certifications	Album
Title	Year	UK	AUS Hit.	BEL (FL)	BEL (WA)	JPN	MEX	SCO	SWI	US Alt.	US Dance	Certifications	Album
"Evening/Morning" (Note: "Evening/Morning" was reissued in 2010.)	2008	— (Note: "Evening/Morning" did not enter the UK Singles Chart, but peaked at number 23 on the UK Physical Singles Chart Top 100.)	—	—	—	—	—	—	—	—	—		I Had the Blues; But I Shook Them Loose
"Always Like This" (Note: "Always Like This" was reissued in 2009.)	2009	97	—	—	—	50	—	62	—	—	—	BPI: Platinum	I Had the Blues; But I Shook Them Loose
"Dust on the Ground"	2009	166	—	—	—	—	—	50	—	—	—		I Had the Blues; But I Shook Them Loose
"Magnet"	2009	— (Note: "Magnet" did not enter the UK Singles Chart, but peaked at number 24 on the UK Physical Singles Chart Top 100.)	—	—	—	—	39	—	—	—			I Had the Blues; But I Shook Them Loose
"Ivy & Gold / Flaws" (Note: Only the track "Ivy & Gold" received a certified chart placement in the United Kingdom.)	2010	56	—	—	—	—	—	48	—	—	—		Flaws
"Rinse Me Down / Dorcas"	2010	— (Note: "Rinse Me Down / Dorcas" did not enter the UK Singles Chart, but peaked at number 61 on the UK Physical Singles Chart.)	—	—	—	—	—	—	—	—	—		Flaws
"Shuffle"	2011	64	20	65	90	60	23	76	94	38	—	BPI: Silver	A Different Kind of Fix
"Lights Out, Words Gone"	2011	89	—	98	—	—	—	88	—	—	—		A Different Kind of Fix
"Leave It"	2012	—	—	—	—	—	33	—	—	—	4		A Different Kind of Fix
"How Can You Swallow So Much Sleep"	2012	—	—	—	—	—	—	—	—	—	5		A Different Kind of Fix
"Beg"	2012	— (Note: "Beg" did not enter the UK Singles Chart, but peaked at number 17 on the UK Physical Singles Chart.)	—	—	—	—	—	—	—	—	—		A Different Kind of Fix
"Carry Me"	2013	81	—	—	—	—	—	88	—	—	—		So Long, See You Tomorrow
"Luna"	2014	78	—	121	—	—	—	86	—	—	—	BPI: Silver	So Long, See You Tomorrow
"Feel"	2014	75	—	—	—	—	42	90	—	—	—		So Long, See You Tomorrow
"Come To"	2014	—	—	—	—	—	—	—	—	—	—		So Long, See You Tomorrow
"Home by Now"	2014	— (Note: "Home by Now" did not enter the UK Singles Chart, but peaked at number 98 on the UK Streaming Chart.)	—	—	—	—	—	—	—	—	—		So Long, See You Tomorrow
"To the Bone" (Note: Limited release as part of Record Store Day 2014, which included "Reign Down" as the B-side.)	2014	— (Note: "To the Bone" did not enter the UK Official Singles Chart Top 100 but peaked at number 42 on the Official Physical Singles Chart Top 100.)	—	—	—	—	—	—	—	—	—		Non-album single
"Eat, Sleep, Wake (Nothing But You)"	2019	— (Note: "Eat, Sleep, Wake (Nothing But You)" did not enter the UK Official Singles Chart Top 100 but peaked at number 1 on the Official Physical Singles Chart Top 100.)	—	— (Note: "Eat, Sleep, Wake (Nothing But You)" did not enter the Flanders Ultratop Top 50, but charted as an extra tip on the Flanders Ultratop Bubbling Under chart.)	—	—	—	—	—	—	—	BPI: Silver	Everything Else Has Gone Wrong
"Everything Else Has Gone Wrong"	2019	—	—	—	—	—	—	—	—	—	—		Everything Else Has Gone Wrong
"Racing Stripes"	2019	—	—	—	—	—	—	—	—	—	—		Everything Else Has Gone Wrong
"I Can Hardly Speak"	2020	—	—	— (Note: "I Can Hardly Speak" did not enter the Flanders Ultratop Top 50, but charted as an extra tip on the Flanders Ultratop Bubbling Under chart.)	—	—	—	—	—	—	—		Everything Else Has Gone Wrong
"Is It Real"	2020	—	—	— (Note: "Is It Real" did not enter the Flanders Ultratop Top 50, but charted as an extra tip on the Flanders Ultratop Bubbling Under chart.)	—	—	—	—	—	—	—		Everything Else Has Gone Wrong
"Two Lives"	2020	—	—	—	—	—	—	—	—	—	—		Two Lives EP
"My Big Day"	2023	—	—	—	—	—	—	—	—	—	—		My Big Day
"Turn the World On"	2023	—	—	—	—	—	—	—	—	—	—		My Big Day
"Tekken 2" (featuring Chaka Khan)	2023	—	—	—	—	—	—	—	—	—	—		My Big Day
"Fantasneeze"	2024	— (Note: "Fantasneeze" did not enter the UK Singles Chart, but debuted and peaked at number 94 on the UK Singles Downloads Chart on 1 March 2024.)	—	—	—	—	—	—	—	—	—		Non-album single
"—" denotes a recording that did not chart or was not released in that territory.

==== Promotional singles ====
Title	Year	Album
"Let You Go (Acoustic)"	2020	Two Lives EP
"Racing Stripes (Acoustic)"	2020	Two Lives EP

==== Split singles ====
Title	Year	Peak chart positions	Other artist(s)	Album
Title	Year	UK Sales	Other artist(s)	Album
"Road" / "Northern Sky"	2023	6	The Staves, Kris Drever, Karine Polwart	The Endless Coloured Ways – The Songs Of Nick Drake

== Other charted songs ==
Title	Year	Peak chart positions	Album
Title	Year	UK Stream	Album
"It's Alright Now"	2014	74	So Long, See You Tomorrow
"Overdone"	2014	79	So Long, See You Tomorrow
