= NME Awards 2012 =

Award

- Date: 29 February 2012
- City: London, England, United Kingdom
- Venue: Brixton Academy
- Host: Jack Whitehall

The NME Awards 2012 were held in London, England, on 29 February 2012, at the Brixton Academy and was hosted by English comedian Jack Whitehall. The nominations were announced exclusively on Zane Lowe's BBC Radio 1 show on 30 January 2012. Arctic Monkeys had seven nominations, followed by Kasabian, who went on to win best British Band, Lana Del Rey and Muse with three apiece.

== Nominations ==
Winners are in bold text.

=== Best British Band ===
- Arctic Monkeys
- Bombay Bicycle Club
- The Horrors
- **Kasabian**
- Muse

=== Best International Band ===
- Arcade Fire
- **Foo Fighters**
- Justice
- Odd Future
- The Strokes

=== Best Solo Artist ===
- Adele
- **Florence and the Machine**
- Frank Turner
- Laura Marling
- Miles Kane
- Noel Gallagher's High Flying Birds

=== Best New Band ===
- Foster the People
- Lana Del Rey
- Tribes
- **The Vaccines**
- Wu Lyf

=== Best Live Band ===
- **Arctic Monkeys**
- Kasabian
- Muse
- Pulp
- Two Door Cinema Club

=== Best Album ===
- Arctic Monkeys – Suck It and See
- **The Horrors – Skying**
- Noel Gallagher's High Flying Birds – Noel Gallagher's High Flying Birds
- PJ Harvey – Let England Shake
- The Vaccines – What Did You Expect from the Vaccines?

=== Best Track ===
- Arctic Monkeys – "The Hellcat Spangled Shalalala"
- Bombay Bicycle Club – "Shuffle"
- **Florence and the Machine – "Shake It Out"**
- Hurts – "Sunday"
- Lana Del Rey – "Video Games"

=== Dancefloor Anthem ===
- Azealia Banks – "212"
- Foster the People – "Pumped Up Kicks"
- Justice – "Civilization"
- **Katy B – "Broken Record"**
- Metronomy – "The Bay"

=== Best Video ===
- Arctic Monkeys – "Suck It and See"
- Beyoncé – "Countdown"
- **Hurts – "Sunday"**
- Lana Del Rey – "Video Games"
- Tyler, The Creator – "Yonkers"

=== Best TV Show ===
- Doctor Who
- **Fresh Meat**
- Misfits
- Never Mind the Buzzcocks
- This Is England '88

=== Best Festival ===
- Bestival
- Download Festival
- **Glastonbury Festival**
- Reading and Leeds Festivals
- T in the Park
- V Festival

=== Best Film ===
- Black Swan
- Drive
- Harry Potter and the Deathly Hallows – Part 2
- The Inbetweeners Movie
- **Submarine**

=== Best Music Film ===
- **Back and Forth**
- George Harrison: Living in the Material World
- Talihina Sky
- There Are No Innocent Bystanders
- Upside Down: The Creation Records Story

=== Greatest Music Moment of the Year ===
- Brian May joins My Chemical Romance onstage at Reading Festival
- Kasabian see in 2012 with their epic London O2 Arena show
- Noel Gallagher launches his solo career with press conference
- Pulp steal the show at Glastonbury with secret set
- **The Stone Roses reunite**

=== Best Re-issue ===
- Manic Street Preachers – National Treasures – The Complete Singles
- Nirvana – Nevermind
- Primal Scream – Screamadelica
- The Rolling Stones – Some Girls
- **The Smiths – Complete Re-issues**

=== Best Book ===
- Jared Leto – Notes from the Outernet
- Jarvis Cocker – Mother, Brother, Lover: Selected Lyrics
- Manning Marable – Malcolm X: A Life of Reinvention
- **Noel Fielding – The Scribblings of a Madcap Shambleton**
- Shaun Ryder – Twisting My Melon

=== Hero of the Year ===
- Alex Turner
- Dave Grohl
- **Matt Bellamy**
- Noel Fielding
- Noel Gallagher

=== Villain of the Year ===
- David Cameron
- **Justin Bieber**
- Lady Gaga
- Liam Gallagher
- Nick Clegg

=== Worst album ===
- Coldplay – Mylo Xyloto
- **Justin Bieber – Under the Mistletoe**
- Lady Gaga – Born This Way
- One Direction – Up All Night
- Viva Brother – Famous First Words

=== Worst Band ===
- Beady Eye
- Coldplay
- Muse
- **One Direction**
- Viva Brother

=== Best Album Artwork ===
- Arctic Monkeys – Suck It and See
- Bombay Bicycle Club – A Different Kind of Fix
- Björk – Biophilia
- **Friendly Fires – Pala**
- Jay-Z and Kanye West – Watch the Throne

=== Best Band Blog or Twitter ===
- @Example (Example)
- Frank-Turner.com/blog (Frank Turner)
- @KanyeWest (Kanye West)
- **@LadyGaga (Lady Gaga)**
- @Theohurts (Theo Hutchcraft)

=== Best Small Festival ===
- Field Day
- Hop Farm Festival
- Kendal Calling
- Latitude Festival
- **RockNess**

=== Most Dedicated Fans ===
- Thirty Seconds to Mars
- Arctic Monkeys
- Hurts
- **Muse**
- My Chemical Romance

=== Hottest Male ===
- Andy Biersack
- Dominic Howard
- Gerard Way
- **Jared Leto**
- Matt Bellamy

=== Hottest Female ===
- Amy Lee
- Florence Welch
- **Hayley Williams**
- Katy Perry
- Marina Diamandis

=== Godlike Genius ===
- **Noel Gallagher**

=== Outstanding Contribution to Music ===
- **Pulp**

== Performances ==
- Noel Gallagher's High Flying Birds – "Everybody's on the Run", "Dream On", "Don't Look Back in Anger"
- The Horrors – "Still Life" (with Florence Welch)
- Florence and the Machine – "Shake It Out"
- The Vaccines – "If You Wanna"
- Kasabian – "Switchblade Smiles", "Days Are Forgotten"
- The Maccabees – "Pelican"
- Pulp – "Mis-Shapes"
