= My Big Day =

Studio album by Bombay Bicycle Club
- Released: 20 October 2023
- Studios: The Church, London
- Length: 43:34
- Labels: Mmm...; Island; AWAL
- Producer: Jack Steadman

Bombay Bicycle Club chronology
Everything Else Has Gone Wrong (2020)	My Big Day (2023)	Fantasies (2024)

Singles from My Big Day
- 1. "My Big Day" Released: 14 June 2023; 2. "Diving" Released: 19 July 2023; 3. "I Want to Be Your Only Pet" Released: 23 August 2023; 4. "Turn the World On" Released: 13 September 2023; 5. "Tekken 2" Released: 11 October 2023

My Big Day is the sixth studio album by the English indie rock band Bombay Bicycle Club. It was released on 20 October 2023 by the band's own Mmm... Records imprint of Island Records, and was produced by frontman Jack Steadman; the first to be produced by him since 2014's So Long, See You Tomorrow. The album includes collaborations with Jay Som, Nilüfer Yanya, Damon Albarn, Chaka Khan and Holly Humberstone. It received acclaim from critics.

== Recording ==
The album was recorded at The Church Studios in North London.

"Sleepless" and "Rural Radio Predicts the Rapture" feature sample replays produced by Ali Jamieson, Richard Adlam and Hal Ritson for Replay Heaven.

== Critical reception ==
Professional ratings
Aggregate scores
Source	Rating
Metacritic	82/100
Review scores
Source	Rating
DIY	4.5/5 stars
Evening Standard	4/5 stars
The Line of Best Fit	8/10
MusicOMH	4/5 stars
NME	4/5 stars

My Big Day received a score of 82 out of 100 on review aggregator Metacritic based on six critics' reviews, indicating "universal acclaim". David Smyth of the Evening Standard called the album both "a star-studded surprise" and "an album that is excellently suited to the impatient streaming generation. It's 11 bands for the price of one". Rishi Shah of NME described it as having an "unwavering sense of adventure" and felt "the results are as eclectic as [its guest vocalists] would suggest", concluding that it is "a creative milestone in itself" as well as "a far cry from the four-to-the-floor, teenage guitar band that a whole generation grew up with".

Reviewing the album for The Line of Best Fit, Lana Williams summarised it as the band's "most unpredictable and utterly impressive album to date" as well as "vibrant, joyous, and completely delectable". MusicOMH's John Murphy wrote that "although much of the album is still very recognisable 'Bombay Bicycle Club', it also takes many unexpected turns" on account of its guest vocalists, also dubbing it "the sound of a band off the leash". Lisa Wright of DIY opined that it is a "record that feels effortlessly comfortable in its own skin whilst still managing to tread new ground" and "the best the band have ever sounded".

== Track listing ==
All tracks are written by Jack Steadman, except where noted.

My Big Day track listing
No.	Title	Writer(s)	Length
1.	"Just a Little More Time"		3:22
2.	"I Want to Be Your Only Pet"		3:34
3.	"Sleepless" (with Jay Som)	Steadman; Beatrice Laus; Melina Duterte; Shinichi Tanabe	4:05
4.	"My Big Day"	Steadman; Ed Nash	2:48
5.	"Turn the World On"		3:30
6.	"Meditate" (with Nilüfer Yanya)		5:23
7.	"Rural Radio Predicts the Rapture"		2:04
8.	"Heaven" (with Damon Albarn)	Steadman; Damon Albarn; Pierre-Edouard Décimus	5:22
9.	"Tekken 2" (with Chaka Khan)		3:50
10.	"Diving" (featuring Holly Humberstone)		3:35
11.	"Onward"		6:01
Total length:			43:34

Notes

- "Sleepless" contains elements of the composition "Hell's Gate Island", as written by Shinichi Tanabe.
- "My Big Day" contains elements from the sample pack 1993 by Soul Surplus.
- "Rural Radio Predicts the Rapture" contains elements of the composition "La Peri", as written by Paul Dukas.
- "Heaven" contains elements of "Pouqui" by Les Vikings de la Guadeloupe, as written by Pierre-Edouard Décimus.

== Personnel ==
Bombay Bicycle Club

- Jack Steadman – brass arrangement and composition (11)
- Jamie MacColl
- Suren De Saram
- Ed Nash

Additional musicians

- Freya Douglas-Morris – backing vocals (1, 8)
- Tamara Douglas-Morris – backing vocals (1, 8)
- James Higson – backing vocals (1, 8)
- Neill MacColl – backing vocals (1, 8)
- Daniel McCarthy – backing vocals (1, 8)
- Rae Morris – backing vocals (1, 5, 8)
- Will Taylor – backing vocals (1, 2)
- Nicolas Hill – backing vocals (1, 2)
- Dorcas Kiernan – backing vocals (9)
- Sally Herbert – strings, brass and woodwind arrangement and composition (8)
- Kate St John – brass arrangement and composition (11)
- Natalie Bonner – violin (8)
- Calina de la Mare – violin (8)
- Richard George – violin (8)
- Everton Nelson – violin (8)
- Tom Pigott-Smith – violin (8)
- Reiad Chibah – viola (8, 11)
- Kate Musker – viola (8)
- Ian Burdge – cello (8)
- Richard Pryce – bass (8)
- Dan Newell – trumpet (8)
- Richard Watkins – French horn (8, 11)
- Andy Woods – trombone (8, 11)
- Eliza Marshall – flute (8)
- Anthony Pike – clarinet (8), bass clarinet (8)
- Tom Leaper – saxophone (2, 6, 11)
- Dan Berry – saxophone (6, 11)
- Jonny Murray – trumpet (6, 11)

Technical

- Jack Steadman – production (all tracks)
- Paul Epworth – production (8)
- Ben H. Allen – production (5)
- Dave Fridmann – mixing (all tracks)
- Matt Wiggins – engineering (1–4, 6–11)
- Billy Halliday – engineering (5)
- Chiara Ferracuti – assistant engineering (1–7, 9–11)
- Balázs Altsach – assistant engineering (8)
- Greg Calbi – mastering
- Steve Fallone (Note: Erroneously credited as "Steve Ferrone" in the liner notes.) – mastering

Sample replay on "Sleepless"

- Ali Jamieson – production, vocals, keyboards and programming
- Hal Ritson – production, vocals, guitar and bass, keyboards and programming
- Richard Adlam – production, vocals, keyboards and programming
- Kelly Barnes – vocals
- Vula Malinga – vocals
- Stuart Pringle – drums
- Nerys Richard – cello
- Marianne Haynes – violins
- Graeme Blevins – flutes
- Neil Waters – trumpets

Sample replay on "Rural Radio Predicts the Rapture"

- Ali Jamieson – production, keyboards and programming
- Hal Ritson – production, keyboards and programming
- Richard Adlam – production, keyboards and programming
- Neil Waters – trumpets
- Ashley Slater – trombone and horns

Art

- Amelia Studios – creative direction
- Brendan Freeman – artwork photographs
- Rory Dewar – cover design
- Ed Nash – cover design

== Charts ==
Chart performance for My Big Day
Chart (2023)	Peak position
Irish Albums (IRMA)	20
Scottish Albums (Official Charts)	2
UK Albums (Official Charts)	3
UK Independent Albums (Official Charts)	1
