= Flyte (band) =

English alternative folk duo

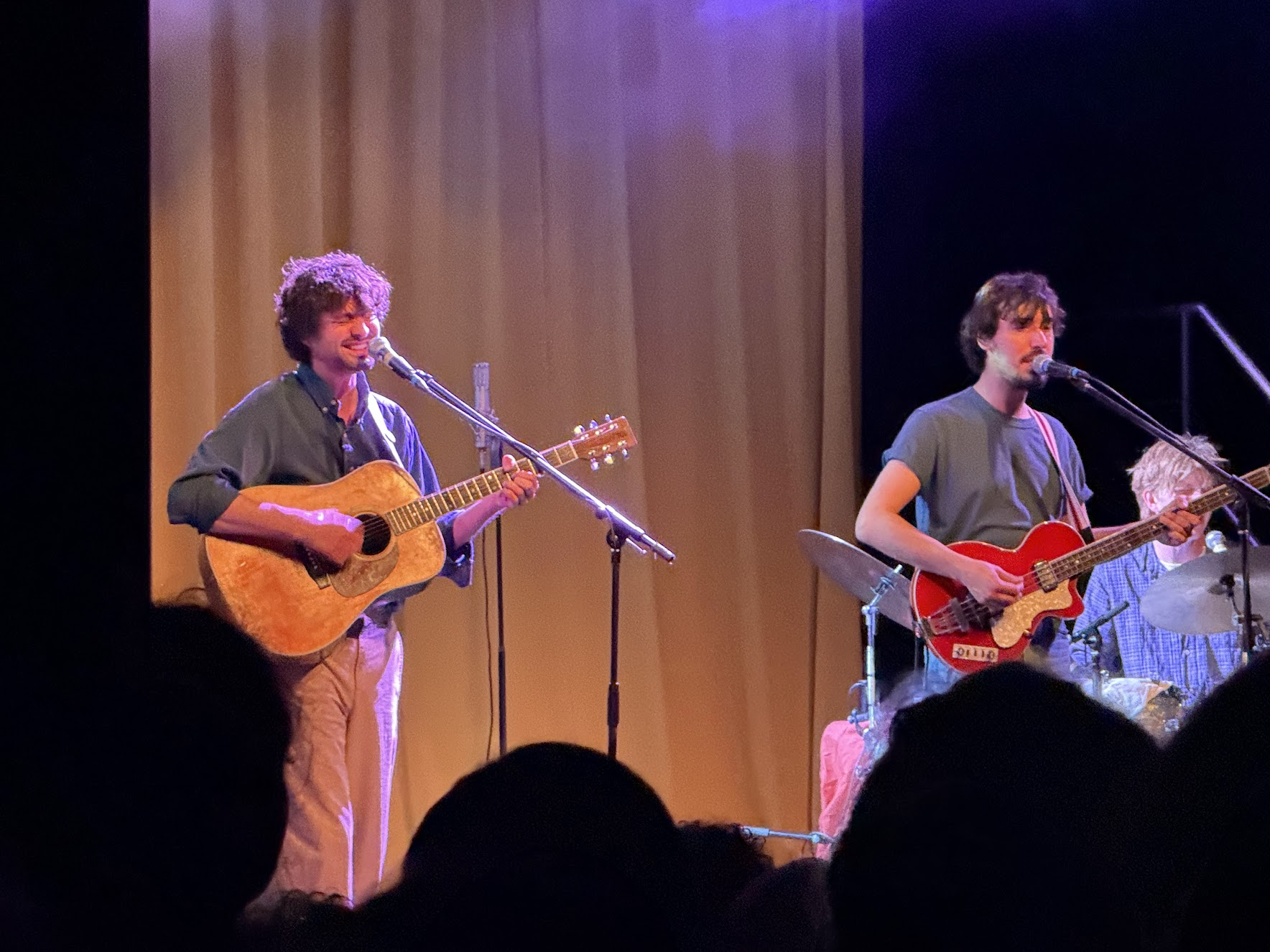
- Flyte in May 2026

Background information
- Origin: London
- Genres: Alternative folk
- Years active: 2013–present
- Label: Island Records
- Members: Will Taylor; Nicolas Hill
- Past members: Jon Supran; Sam Berridge
- Website: flytetheband.com

Flyte are recording artists from London, England, known for their crafted and often confessional songwriting style.

After extensive touring of Europe and North America, Flyte teamed back up with Andrew Sarlo at London's Konk (recording studio), to record their pared back, self titled third record, inspired by Taylor's relationship with partner and artist Billie Marten. It featured artists such as Laura Marling, Bombay Bicycle Club and Madison Cunningham.

== Early years ==
Taylor and Hill first met at a city-run youth theatre company ages 10 and 13. Taylor's parents were both English teachers. Various formations of the band with Jon Supran occurred throughout their teenage years. Berridge was the final member to join; the rest of the band first heard Berridge singing in the London Underground. After a video of Taylor and Berridge covering Joni Mitchell's "River" went viral, the band signed a record deal with Island Records.

Flyte's first single "We Are the Rain" was released on Transgressive Records on 28 April 2014. The single and B-side "Where Nobody Knows Your Name" were mixed and produced by Dan Grech-Marguerat and released digitally along with a limited run of 7-inch vinyl. The video for "We Are the Rain" was premiered by Michael Cragg on The Guardian's music blog. The single received support from Radio 1, XFM, BBC 6Music, BBC London, and Amazing Radio. It was announced in 2013 that the band had been signed by Island Records

The second single from Light Me Up was released on Turned Out Nice / Island Records on 17 November 2014. The single was recorded by Hugh Fielding at the band's own recording facility within Goldmine Studios in Bethnal Green and mixed by Mike Crossey.

The band released two further singles on Island Records: "Closer Together" and "Please Eloise". "Closer Together" was remixed by Bombay Bicycle Club singer Jack Steadman.

== Debut album The Loved Ones ==
In 2017, Flyte flew to Australia to work with Courtney Barnett's producer Burke Reid on their debut album. Focusing on their live performances and the band's four voices around one microphone, they took their production cues from David Bowie, Nick Drake, The Beatles and Lou Reed. The album The Loved Ones was released on 25 August 2017 to widespread critical acclaim.

== 2018-2021 White Roses and This Is Really Going To Hurt ==
After the departure of Keyboardist and singer Sam Berridge, Flyte became more collaborative, Jess Stavely-Taylor briefly joined the live line up with her band The Staves, contributing vocals to Flyte's White Roses EP

This Is Really Going To Hurt is Flyte's second studio album for Island Records. Production for the record began in England with Burke Reid but was finished in Los Angeles in early 2020 with various producers Justin Raisen, Andrew Sarlo and Ali Chant. The record was mixed by Andrew Sarlo.

== 2023 Flyte ==
Flyte's third studio album was recorded over ten days at Konk Studios in North London. It was produced by Andrew Sarlo and recorded by Dom Monks.

The album was inspired by Taylor's relationship with singer Billie Marten. Musical collaborations include duet with Laura Marling on Tough Love, with Florence Pugh performing the live version.

A Live at RAK Studios of the song Perfect Dark was recorded with Californian artist and collaborator Madison Cunningham and produced by Ethan Johns.

== 2025-2026 Between You and Me ==
On 29 August 2025, Flyte released their fourth studio album, Between You and Me, via Nettwerk Music Group.

In August 2026, the duo performed as part of the BBC Proms celebration of the 40^{th} anniversary of Paul Simon's Graceland.

== Discography ==
=== Studio albums ===
Title	Release date
The Loved Ones	25 August 2017
This Is Really Going to Hurt	9 April 2021
Flyte	27 October 2023
Between You and Me	29 August 2025

=== EPs ===
Title	Release date
Live EP	16 September 2013
Diamond White EP (vinyl only)	8 December 2014
White Roses EP	20 September 2019

=== Singles ===
Title	Date
"We Are the Rain"	28 April 2014
"Light Me Up"	17 November 2014
"Closer Together"	31 July 2015
"Please Eloise"	15 August 2015
"Echoes"	30 January 2017
"Victoria Falls"	24 February 2017
"Cathy Come Home"	7 July 2017
"Moon Unit"	9 March 2018
"Won't Be Home for Christmas"	22 November 2019
"Easy Tiger"	13 May 2020
"Losing You"	23 July 2020
"I've Got a Girl"	21 October 2020
"Under the Skin"	5 February 2021
"Defender"	2 June 2023
"Tough Love" feat. Laura Marling	28 July 2023
