= So Long, See You Tomorrow (album) =

Studio album by Bombay Bicycle Club
- Released: 3 February 2014
- Recorded: 2011–2013
- Genre: Indie rock; indietronica; alternative dance
- Length: 44:55
- Label: Island (UK); Vagrant (US)
- Producer: Jack Steadman

Bombay Bicycle Club chronology
A Different Kind of Fix (2011)	So Long, See You Tomorrow (2014)	Everything Else Has Gone Wrong (2020)

Singles from So Long, See You Tomorrow
- 1. "Carry Me" Released: 5 November 2013; 2. "Luna" Released: 6 January 2014; 3. "Feel" Released: 19 May 2014; 4. "Come To" Released: 18 August 2014; 5. "Home by Now" Released: 1 December 2014

So Long, See You Tomorrow is the fourth album by the London indie rock band Bombay Bicycle Club, released on 3 February 2014. The album is named after the novel of the same name by William Maxwell.

== Musical style and production ==
Similar to the electronica approach of their 2011 album A Different Kind of Fix, the album makes use of sampling and takes influences from world music, marking a shift from their previous albums. Written during frontman Jack Steadman's travels through India, Japan and Turkey, it uses a wider range of instrumentation and a lesser use of guitars, which featured heavily on their debut album. The album was recorded in the band's own studio, with the help of mixing engineer Mark Rankin (whose credits include ...Like Clockwork by Queens of the Stone Age and AlunaGeorge's debut album Body Music, among others). It was produced by Steadman, and marks the band's first release produced by a band member. It features Lucy Rose and Rae Morris on guest vocals.

== Promotion ==
The lead single to promote the album, "Carry Me", was released on 5 November 2013 and accompanied by an interactive music video. It has charted at number 81 on the UK Singles Chart.

The second single, "Luna", followed on 6 January 2014 with a music video directed by Anna Ginsburg and featuring the synchronised swimming troupe Aquabatix. The song charted at number 78 on the UK Singles Chart, and at number 91 on the Official Streaming Chart.

"Feel", a song using a sample from the 1954 Bollywood film Nagin, was released as the third single on 19 May 2014. A music video, directed by Sumit Dutt, premiered on 24 March 2014. The song peaked at number 75 on the UK Singles Chart.

"Come To" was released as the fourth single on 18 August 2014. It was accompanied by a music video featuring footage from Bombay Bicycle Club's live performance of the song.

The fifth single from the album, "Home by Now", was released on 1 December 2014. A music video for the song, featuring a school recreation of Stanley Kubrick's 2001: A Space Odyssey, was released on 27 October 2014.

== Critical reception ==
Professional ratings
Aggregate scores
Source	Rating
AnyDecentMusic?	7.0/10
Metacritic	69/100
Review scores
Source	Rating
AllMusic	4.5/5 stars
The Daily Telegraph	5/5 stars
DIY	4/5 stars
The Guardian	3/5 stars
The Independent	2/5 stars
The Irish Times	4/5 stars
NME	7/10
Pitchfork	7.7/10
Q	3/5 stars
Uncut	8/10

Reception to So Long, See You Tomorrow was generally favourable. At Metacritic, which assigns a normalized rating out of 100 to reviews from mainstream critics, the album received an average score of 69, based on 24 reviews.

In a positive review for Clash magazine, Gareth James praised the wealth of guitar riffs, and noted that "BBC's ambition was there for all to hear on their last record, but it is with So Long, See You Tomorrow that they have fully realised it. What could so nearly have been overbearing or desperate to be loved is, in actual fact, sincerely captivating and euphorically playful." Matt Collar of AllMusic commented that "while there are definitely Bollywood-esque qualities here, ... the results are never overt or heavy-handed. These are organic, living productions that touch upon rave culture and world music while remaining rooted in melodic songcraft."

The album was shortlisted for the 2014 Barclaycard Mercury Prize.

== Commercial performance ==
On the week of its release, So Long, See You Tomorrow debuted at number one on the UK Albums Chart, becoming Bombay Bicycle Club's first release to do so. The album has also charted in Australia, several European countries, and on the US Billboard 200 chart.

== Track listing ==
All tracks are written by Jack Steadman, except where noted.

So Long, See You Tomorrow track listing
No.	Title	Length
1.	"Overdone" (Steadman, Rahul Dev Burman, Anand Bakshi)	3:39
2.	"It's Alright Now"	4:10
3.	"Carry Me"	4:25
4.	"Home by Now"	4:35
5.	"Whenever, Wherever"	5:31
6.	"Luna"	3:11
7.	"Eyes Off You"	3:57
8.	"Feel" (Steadman, Hemant Kumar, Rajinder Krishan, Medoune Diallo)	5:00
9.	"Come To"	4:25
10.	"So Long, See You Tomorrow"	6:02

== Personnel ==
Bombay Bicycle Club

- Jack Steadman – vocals, guitar, sampler, piano, bass
- Jamie MacColl – guitar, bass
- Ed Nash – bass
- Suren de Saram – drums

Technical personnel

- Jack Steadman – production
- Ben H. Allen – production (track 6)
- Bombay Bicycle Club – arrangement
- Mark Rankin – engineering, mixing
- Dougal Lott – engineering and mixing assistant
- Josh Green – engineering and mixing assistant
- Joseph Rogers – additional engineering (track 2)
- Mike Marsh – mastering (except track 9)
- Simon Davey – mastering (track 9)

Additional musicians

- Rae Morris – additional vocals (tracks 1, 6 and 10)
- Lucy Rose – additional vocals (tracks 2–4 and 7–9)
- Dorcas Kiernan – additional vocals (track 9)
- Hazel Yule – additional vocals (track 9)
- The Brass Notes – horns (tracks 1, 2, 5, 8 and 10)
  - Jack Bennington – trumpet, flugelhorn
  - Dan Berry – tenor/alto saxophone
  - Alex Coppard – tenor/alto saxophone
- Sarah Morpurgo – flute (track 1)
- Kate St John – cor anglais (track 1)
- Louis Bhose – piano (track 5)

Additional personnel

- La Boca – design

Samples

- "Overdone" features a sample of "Apney Pyar Ke Sapney" by Kishore Kumar and Lata Mangeshkar
- "Carry Me" features a sample from "Travelling Song" by Lucy Rose
- "Feel" features a sample of "Man Dole Mera Tan Dole" by Lata Mangeshkar

== Chart positions ==
=== Weekly charts ===
Weekly chart performance for So Long, See You Tomorrow
Chart (2014)	Peak position
Australian Albums (ARIA)	36
Belgian Albums (Ultratop Flanders)	95
Belgian Albums (Ultratop Wallonia)	130
Dutch Albums (Album Top 100)	74
German Albums (Offizielle Top 100)	78
Irish Albums (IRMA)	8
Scottish Albums (OCC)	2
UK Albums (OCC)	1
UK Album Downloads (OCC)	1
US Billboard 200	101
US Independent Albums (Billboard)	14
US Top Alternative Albums (Billboard)	14
US Top Heatseekers Albums (Billboard)	1
US Top Rock Albums (Billboard)	27

Chart (2024)	Peak position
Scottish Albums (OCC)	72

=== Year-end charts ===
Year-end chart performance for So Long, See You Tomorrow
Chart (2014)	Position
UK Albums (OCC)	80
