= Allman Brown =

British singer-songwriter (born 1984)

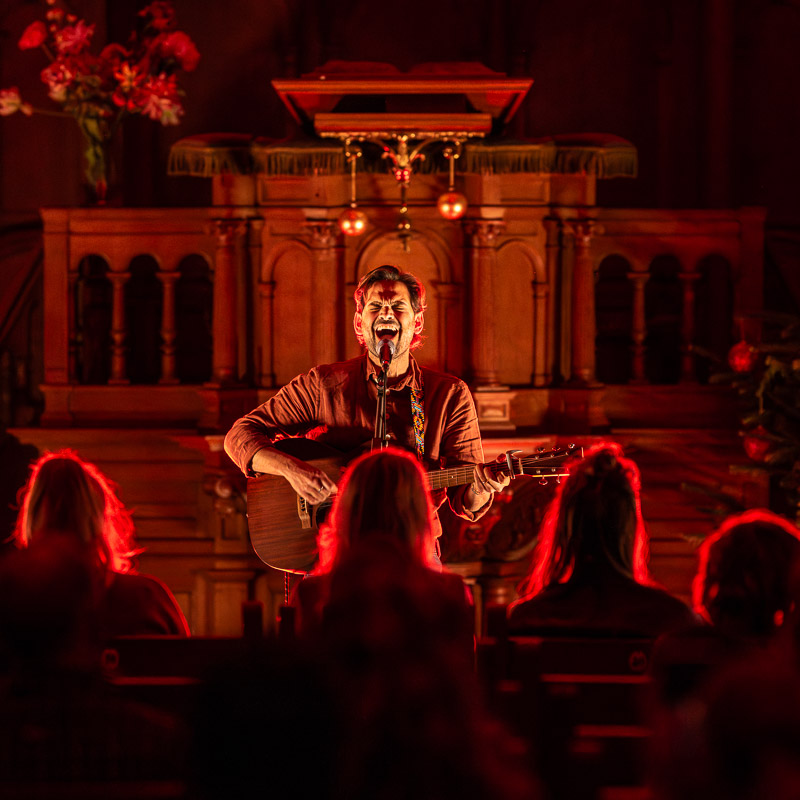
- Brown performing at the Penninckshuis in Deventer on 18 December 2025

Background information
- Born: 1984 (age 41–42); Hong Kong
- Origin: London, England
- Genres: Folk pop; Indie folk; Singer-songwriter
- Occupation: Singer-songwriter
- Years active: 2013–present

Allman Brown (born 1984) is a British singer-songwriter based in London. He came to prominence in 2013 with the single "Sons & Daughters", a duet with Liz Lawrence and has since released four studio albums, 1000 Years (2017). Darling, It'll Be Alright (2019) Second Son (2024) and Sooner rather than Later (2026).

== Early life ==
Brown was born in 1984 in Hong Kong, to a Singaporean mother and an English father. He spent his early childhood in Hong Kong before being sent to Brambletye School in West Sussex at age eight. The family relocated permanently to the United Kingdom in 1997.

Brown attended Harrow School and studied world cinema and European film at the University of Exeter.

== Career ==
Brown's 2013 debut single "Sons & Daughters", co-written and recorded with Liz Lawrence, was picked up by streaming playlists and music blogs and was subsequently licensed for the television series Parenthood, Reign and Beauty and the Beast. A follow-up EP, Your Love, appeared on Akira Records in 2015.

His debut album 1000 Years was released in February 2017 and was produced by Ian Barter. The record drew on folk and subtle electronic textures and featured guest vocals from Lawrence, Lowell and Robyn Sherwell.

A second album, Darling, It'll Be Alright, followed in May 2019, again produced by Barter. In support of the record, Brown opened for Dido on her 2019 UK and Ireland tour, and the single "Dust & Heat" was playlisted by BBC Radio 2 and RTÉ Radio 1.

The three-track EP Reflections followed in August 2020, with the EP Gold In The Water released the following year. Brown's songs have been used in television series including The Good Doctor, Station 19, Criminal Minds, Suits and Hollyoaks.

== Discography ==
=== Studio albums ===
- 1000 Years (2017)
- Darling, It'll Be Alright (2019)
- Second Son (2024)
- Sooner Rather Than Later (2026)

=== Selected EPs ===
- Sons and Daughters (2013)
- Your Love (2015, Akira Records)
- Bury My Heart (2018)
- Reflections (2020)
- Gold In The Water (2021)
