= Everything Else Has Gone Wrong =

Studio album by Bombay Bicycle Club
- Released: 17 January 2020
- Recorded: 25 March–14 September 2019
- Studios: Konk (London); Sargent Recorders (Los Angeles)
- Length: 41:40
- Labels: Mmm... Records; Island; Caroline; Arts & Crafts
- Producers: John Congleton; Jack Steadman

Bombay Bicycle Club chronology
So Long, See You Tomorrow (2014)	Everything Else Has Gone Wrong (2020)	My Big Day (2023)

Singles from Everything Else Has Gone Wrong
- 1. "Eat, Sleep, Wake (Nothing but You)" Released: 27 August 2019; 2. "Everything Else Has Gone Wrong" Released: 27 November 2019; 3. "Racing Stripes" Released: 19 December 2019; 4. "I Can Hardly Speak" Released: 1 January 2020; 5. "Is It Real" Released: 14 January 2020

Everything Else Has Gone Wrong is the fifth studio album by the English indie rock band Bombay Bicycle Club. It was released on 17 January 2020 by the band's own Mmm... Records imprint of Island Records, Caroline International and Arts & Crafts. It was their first album in nearly six years, following So Long, See You Tomorrow (2014).

The album debuted at number one on the UK's Official Record Store Chart.

== Background and recording ==
Bombay Bicycle Club announced an indefinite hiatus on 29 January 2016. However, they explicitly ruled out the notion that the band was breaking up and also alluded toward potential solo material from frontman Jack Steadman and bassist Ed Nash. However, in an interview with Q Nash recalled Steadman saying that he did not think he wanted to make another Bombay Bicycle Club album. In January 2017, Nash released the solo album The Pace of the Passing under the moniker Toothless. It featured vocals by Marika Hackman, Tom Fleming, Liz Lawrence and The Staves. Bombay Bicycle Club drummer Suren de Saram contributed drumming to the record. The album was produced by Nash and Steadman. In March 2017, Steadman formed the solo project Mr Jukes, releasing the album God First in July 2017. The album was produced by Steadman and featured BJ the Chicago Kid, Elli Ingram, Charles Bradley, De La Soul, Horace Andy, Lalah Hathaway, Lianne La Havas. During the band's hiatus, guitarist Jamie MacColl completed an undergraduate degree in war studies at King's College London and a MPhil in international relations at the University of Cambridge. He worked as an intelligence analyst for a social security company and also worked at a think tank in Washington, D.C. He also launched Undivided, a Brexit campaign group to engage with people under the age of 30. Nash worked for some time in an office job in the interim. Steadman traveled extensively, including a voyage on the Trans-Siberian Railway and passage aboard a cargo ship from China to Canada.

The band later sold all of their equipment and initially had no plans to record new music or tour. MacColl believed the band had effectively broken up, but was surprised when Steadman decided to be in the band again. Months after selling their equipment, they discussed the possibility of doing a one-off tour to celebrate the tenth anniversary of their debut album I Had the Blues But I Shook Them Loose (2009). However, they believed a one-off anniversary tour was not appropriate considering they were a relatively young band and since they felt they still had ideas for music. They instead quickly focused on writing new music.

In January 2019, the band announced that they were ending their hiatus and that they would be performing concerts later in 2019, with intentions to record new music as well. Bombay Bicycle Club began recording for Everything Else Has Gone Wrong on 25 March 2019 at Konk Studios in London. The band released an extended play of demos from 2004 to 2008 on 3 July 2019, marking exactly ten years since the release of their debut album on 3 July 2009. The band completed recording for the album on 14 September 2019 with producer John Congleton at Sargent Recorders in Los Angeles, California. The album was primarily produced by John Congleton with additional production by Steadman, except "Racing Stripes" which was produced by both Congleton and Steadman.

== Release and promotion ==
The lead single to promote the album, "Eat, Sleep, Wake (Nothing but You)", was released on 27 August 2019. A music video directed by Louis Bhose, the band's former touring keyboardist, was released on 3 September 2019 and was shot in Ukraine. The second single, "Everything Else Has Gone Wrong", was released on 27 November 2019. An accompanying music video directed by Louis Bhose was released the same day. On 19 December 2019, "Racing Stripes" was released as the third single with an accompanying music video directed by Louis Bhose and shot in the Lofoten Islands of northern Norway. "I Can Hardly Speak" was released as the fourth single on 1 January 2020. "Is It Real" was released as the fifth single on 14 January 2020.

== Artwork ==
The artwork illustrations for the album and its singles were commissioned by the band from Spanish artist María Medem.

== Critical reception ==
Professional ratings
Aggregate scores
Source	Rating
AnyDecentMusic?	7.4/10
Metacritic	74/100
Review scores
Source	Rating
AllMusic	4.5/5 stars
The Daily Telegraph	4/5 stars
Exclaim!	8/10
The Guardian	2/5 stars
The Independent	4/5 stars
NME	3/5 stars
Pitchfork	5.9/10
Q	4/5 stars
The Times	2/5 stars
Uncut	7/10

Everything Else Has Gone Wrong received mostly favourable reviews from contemporary music critics. At Metacritic, which assigns a normalised rating out of 100 from reviews from mainstream critics, the album received a score of 74, based on sixteen reviews, indicating "generally favorable reviews". Aggregator AnyDecentMusic? gave it 7.4 out of 10, based on their assessment of the critical consensus.

Niall Doherty of Q gave the album a favourable review, writing, "Jack Steadman's breezy melodies are the perfect counter to the mutating musical backdrop." Greg Cochrane of Uncut gave the album a favourable review, calling "Good Day" its "vulnerable centerpiece" and "Eat, Sleep, Wake (Nothing but You)" a "reminder of how far they've advanced since their early badge as adolescent indie rockers."

== Track listing ==
Everything Else Has Gone Wrong track listing
No.	Title	Writer(s)	Producer(s)	Length
1.	"Get Up"	Jack Steadman	John Congleton; Steadman^{[a]}	2:33
2.	"Is It Real"	Steadman	Congleton; Steadman^{[a]}	3:05
3.	"Everything Else Has Gone Wrong"	Steadman	Congleton; Steadman^{[a]}	4:09
4.	"I Can Hardly Speak"	Steadman	Congleton; Steadman^{[a]}	3:59
5.	"Good Day"	Ed Nash	Congleton	3:52
6.	"Eat, Sleep, Wake (Nothing but You)"	Nash; Steadman	Congleton; Steadman^{[a]}	3:39
7.	"I Worry Bout You"	Steadman	Congleton; Steadman^{[a]}	3:40
8.	"People People" (featuring Liz Lawrence)	Liz Lawrence; Nash	Congleton	3:27
9.	"Do You Feel Loved?"	Steadman	Congleton; Steadman^{[a]}	4:22
10.	"Let You Go"	Steadman	Congleton; Steadman^{[a]}	4:48
11.	"Racing Stripes"	Steadman	Steadman; Congleton	4:06
Total length:				41:40

Notes

- ^{^[a]} signifies an additional producer.

== Personnel ==
Credits adapted from the liner notes of Everything Else Has Gone Wrong.

Bombay Bicycle Club

- Jack Steadman
- Jamie MacColl
- Suren De Saram
- Ed Nash

Additional musicians

- Liz Lawrence – vocals (track 8), backing vocals (tracks 2, 6, 9)
- Billie Marten – backing vocals (track 11)
- Nate Walcott – trumpet (tracks 2, 4, 7, 9)
- Aniela Marie Perry – cello (tracks 2, 4, 9, 11)
- Elizabeth Baba – violin (tracks 2, 4, 9)
- Madeline Falcone – violin (tracks 2, 4, 9)
- Marta Sofia Honer – viola (tracks 2, 4, 9)
- David Moyer – tenor saxophone (tracks 2, 7, 9)
- David Urquidi – tenor saxophone (tracks 2, 7, 9)

Technical

- Jack Steadman – production (track 11), additional production (tracks 1–10)
- John Congleton – production (all tracks), mixing (all tracks), engineering (all tracks)
- Greg Calbi – mastering
- Sean Cook – assistant engineer (Sargent)
- George Chung – assistant engineer (Konk)

Artwork

- María Medem – artwork illustrations
- Joe Prytherch – artwork layout, logo

== Charts ==
Chart performance for Everything Else Has Gone Wrong
Chart (2020)	Peak position
Australian Digital Albums (ARIA)	48
Belgian Albums (Ultratop Flanders)	172
German Albums (Offizielle Top 100)	68
Irish Albums (Official Charts)	24
Scottish Albums (Official Charts)	4
UK Albums (Official Charts)	4
