= Outernet (disambiguation) =

Outernet may refer to:

- The previous name of the company Othernet
- Outernet (novel series), a humorous series of children's science fiction books written by Steve Barlow and Steve Skidmore
- Outernet London, a mixed use urban development
- Notes from the Outernet, a 2011 limited edition book of intimate photographs taken by Jared Leto
- The "Outernet Song", a 2016 single by Janet Devlin
- United States Joint All-Domain Command and Control#Outernet, the US Space Force's internet in outer space
