= Ivy & Gold =

Single by Bombay Bicycle Club

from the album Flaws
- Released: 9 May 2010
- Recorded: 2009
- Genre: Alternative, indie, indie folk
- Length: 2:56
- Label: Island
- Songwriter: Jack Steadman
- Producer: Jim Abbiss

Bombay Bicycle Club singles chronology
"Evening/Morning" (2010)	"Ivy & Gold" (2010)	"Rinse Me Down / Dorcas" (2010)

"Ivy & Gold" is the first single by British alternative rock band Bombay Bicycle Club from their second studio album, Flaws. Released through Island Records on 5 July 2010, the single was a double A-side with the album's title track "Flaws", and reached a peak of number 56 on the UK Singles Chart.

== Track listing ==
- Digital Download / CD Single

No.	Title	Length
1.	"Ivy & Gold"	2:57
2.	"Flaws"	2:56

== Music video ==
Although no actual video to accompany the release of the video was released, the band did record an acoustic performance of "Ivy & Gold" which began circulating in June 2010. The video features the performance of the song, with the members of the band providing the whistling sound effects throughout the video. During the recording of the video, the room door is opened allowing a group of people to enter the room, who then begin to dance in accordance with the single.

== Chart performance ==
On 11 July 2010, "Ivy & Gold" debuted on the UK Singles Chart at number 98, the band's second Top 100 entry after "Always Like This" reached number 97 in April 2009. The following week, the single rose to number 56, marking the band's most successful single to date. On its third week in the chart, the single fell to number 81.

Chart (2010)	Peak position
UK Singles (OCC)	56
