= Liz Lawrence =

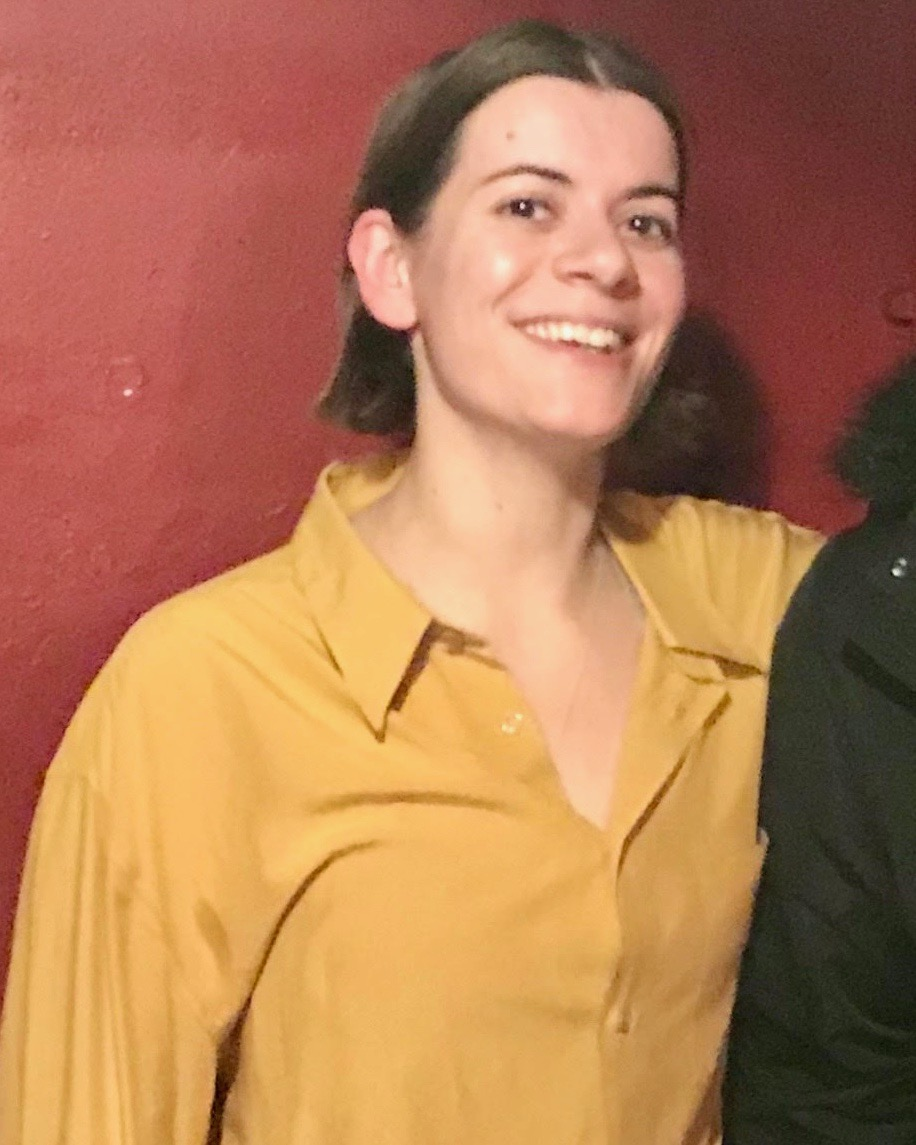
- Lawrence at the merch stand at the Deaf Institute in Manchester, England, 2020

Background information
- Born: Elizabeth Lawrence; 9 July 1990 (age 36); Stratford-upon-Avon, Warwickshire, England
- Genre: Indie pop
- Occupations: Singer; songwriter; composer; musician; record producer
- Instruments: Vocals; guitar; keyboards; synthesizer
- Years active: 2012–present
- Labels: Chrysalis; Ceol Music Ltd; Second Breakfast
- Website: lizlawrencemusic.co.uk

Elizabeth Lawrence (born 9 July 1990) is an English singer, songwriter and guitarist, known for her solo work and for being half of electro-pop duo Cash+David.

She has toured with Bombay Bicycle Club, and supported Black, Scouting for Girls, and Ani DiFranco, amongst others. Q Magazine compared Lawrence favourably to indie rock band Florence and the Machine, considering her "a starlet in the making".

== Career ==
Having played in various bands in her youth before embarking on a solo career and relocating to London, Lawrence's debut studio album, Bedroom Hero, was released in 2012, reaching No. 2 on the Bandcamp album chart. In February 2017, Lawrence featured on the song "Party for Two" from the album The Pace of the Passing by Bombay Bicycle Club member Ed Nash's solo project, Toothless. 2018 saw the release of singles "The Good Part" and "Woman"; the former was mixed by Bombay Bicycle Club's Jack Steadman. Her second album, Pity Party, was released on October 25, 2019. NME called the album "powerful" and considered that it "embraces her lo-fi folk past but also brings it into the here and now with satisfying pop elements" Lawrence featured as a vocalist on Bombay Bicycle Club's 2020 album Everything Else Has Gone Wrong. On September 17, 2021, Lawrence’s third album The Avalanche was released. She released her album Vespers in June 2026.

== Personal life ==
Lawrence's sister died in a sudden accident in 2024. Lawrence embarked on a 300 mile charity walk across Ireland to raise money for the charity she worked at.

== Discography ==
=== Albums ===
Title	Release details
Bedroom Hero	Release date: 2012; Label: Ceol Music Ltd; Formats: CD, streaming, digital download
Pity Party	Release date: October 25, 2019; Label: Second Breakfast; Formats: CD, LP, streaming, digital download
The Avalanche	Release date: September 17, 2021; Label: Second Breakfast; Formats: CD, LP, streaming, digital download
Peanuts	Release date: June 7, 2024; Label: Chrysalis; Formats: CD, LP, streaming, digital download
Peanuts (Deluxe)	Release date: November 8, 2024; Label: Chrysalis; Formats: CD, LP, streaming, digital download
Vespers	Release date: June 5, 2026; Label: Chrysalis; Formats: CD, LP, streaming, digital download

=== Extended Plays ===
Title	Release details
Health and Safety	Release date: June 15, 2014; Label: Liz Lawrence Music; Formats: CD, streaming, digital download
Whoosh	Release date: February 10, 2020; Label: Second Breakfast; Formats: streaming, digital download
Live At The Brudenell Social Club	Release date: December 17, 2021; Label: Second Breakfast; Formats: streaming, digital download
I Was There	Release date: September 26, 2023; Label: Chrysalis; Formats: streaming, digital download

=== Singles ===
Title	Year	Album
"Oo Song"	2012	Bedroom Hero
"Bedroom Hero"	2012	Bedroom Hero
"Health & Safety"	2014	Health & Safety (EP)
"Chainsmoking" / "We Got Love"	2017	non-album single
"Circling Numbers" / "Floors"	2018	non-album single
"The Good Part" / "Woman"	2018	non-album single
"Navigator"	2019	Pity Party
"None Of My Friends"	2019	Pity Party
"USP"	2019	Pity Party
"California Screaming"	2020	Whoosh (EP)
"Hope (Or Something Like It)"	2020	Whoosh (EP)
"Where The Bodies Are Buried"	2021	The Avalanche
"Down For Fun"	2021	The Avalanche
"Saturated"	2021	The Avalanche
"Big Machine"	2024	Peanuts
"Strut"	2024	Peanuts
"No One"	2024	Peanuts
"Ctrl Alt Del"	2024	non-album single
"Big Machine (Acoustic)"	2024	Peanuts (Deluxe)
"Top Level Joy (Acoustic)"	2024	Peanuts (Deluxe)
"Yeti"	2024	Peanuts (Deluxe)
