= Lights Out, Words Gone =

Single by Bombay Bicycle Club

from the album A Different Kind of Fix
- Released: 14 October 2011
- Recorded: 2010
- Genre: Indie rock, indie pop
- Length: 5:01
- Label: Island
- Songwriter(s): Jack Steadman

Bombay Bicycle Club singles chronology
"Shuffle" (2011)	"Lights Out, Words Gone" (2011)	"Leave It" (2011)

"Lights Out, Words Gone" is the second single by the British rock band Bombay Bicycle Club from their third studio album, A Different Kind of Fix. Released through Island Records on 14 October 2011 as a digital download in the United Kingdom, the single peaked at number 89 on the UK Singles Chart.

== Music video ==
A music video to accompany the release of "Lights Out, Words Gone" was first released on YouTube on 6 October 2011, with a total length of three minutes and forty-two seconds. The singer Lucy Rose also contributed vocals to the song. The music video was filmed in Parque de Santa Lucia in Mérida, Yucatán, Mexico.

== Track listing ==
Album version
No.	Title	Length
1.	"Lights Out, Words Gone"	5:01

Digital download
No.	Title	Length
1.	"Lights Out, Words Gone" (Todd Terje Remix)	11:35
2.	"Lights Out, Words Gone" (Dark Sky Remix)	5:46
3.	"Lights Out, Words Gone" (BBC Live Version - Zane Lowe Session)	4:36

== Chart performance ==
Chart (2011)	Peak position
UK Singles (OCC)	89

== Release history ==
Region	Date	Format	Label
United Kingdom	14 October 2011	Digital download	Mercury Records
