= Between You and Me (Flyte album) =

Studio album by Flyte
- Released: 29 August 2025
- Length: 39:46
- Label: Nettwerk
- Producer: Ethan Johns

Flyte chronology
Flyte (2023)	Between You and Me (2025)

Singles from Between You and Me
- 1. "I'm Not There" Released: 14 February 2025; 2. "Emily and Me" Released: 24 March 2025; 3. "Hurt People" Released: 25 April 2025

Between You and Me is the fourth studio album by English folk-rock duo Flyte. It was released on 29 August 2025 via Nettwerk Music Group in LP, CD and digital formats. It includes the singles, "I'm Not There", "Emily and Me", and "Hurt People".

== Background ==
The album was preceded by Flyte's self-titled third album and features ten tracks ranging between two and five minutes each, with a total runtime of approximately forty minutes. It was produced by English record producer Ethan Johns and recorded at Will Taylor's home in London and Johns' studio.

"Hurt People" was released as a single on 25 April 2025. It was preceded by earlier singles "I'm Not There" and "Emily and Me", which were released on 14 February and 24 March.

== Reception ==
Professional ratings
Review scores
Source	Rating
Dork	4/5 stars
The Independent	5/5 stars
Paste	7.1/10

The Independent rated the album five stars and remarked, "For all its folk leanings, Between You and Me also feels strikingly pertinent. The duo explore the fallible nature of humans – our insecurities, our pettiness, with plenty of nuance and compassion."

It received a rating of four out of five from Dork, whose reviewer Minty Mearns commented, "Between You and Me takes its listeners through the motions, but it never once feels over the top," noting the duo's "different approach to making this record" is "the one that sums them up best."

Writing for Paste, Andrew Ha assigned the album a rating of 7.1, opining that "The record possesses an adjacent gentleness, as Johns preserves a ubiquitous intimacy in various shades."

== Track listing ==
All tracks are written by Nicolas Hill and William Taylor; "Alabaster" written with Miya Folick.

No.	Title	Length
1.	"Hurt People"	3:58
2.	"Alabaster" (with Aimee Mann)	4:15
3.	"Emily and Me"	4:12
4.	"I'm So Down"	3:25
5.	"Hello Sunshine"	5:25
6.	"I'm Not There"	4:10
7.	"If You Can't Be Happy"	3:54
8.	"Cold Side of the Pillow"	3:05
9.	"I Just Can't Believe That We're Friends"	4:05
10.	"Everybody Says I Love You"	2:17
Total length:		39:46

== Personnel ==
Credits adapted from Tidal.

- Ethan Johns – production, mixing, engineering
- Matt Colton – mastering
- Delilah Johns – engineering

== Charts ==
Chart performance for Between You and Me
Chart (2025)	Peak position
UK Americana Albums (Official Charts)	18
UK Folk Albums (Official Charts)	6
UK Independent Albums (Official Charts)	46
