= A Different Kind of Fix =

Studio album by Bombay Bicycle Club
- Released: 26 August 2011 (UK); 17 January 2012 (US)
- Recorded: May 2010 – May 2011
- Genres: Indie rock; indie folk; indie pop
- Length: 54:34
- Labels: Island (UK), A&M/Octone (US)
- Producers: Jack Steadman, Jim Abbiss, Ben Allen

Bombay Bicycle Club chronology
iTunes Festival: London 2010 (2010)	A Different Kind of Fix (2011)	So Long, See You Tomorrow (2014)

Singles from A Different Kind of Fix
- 1. "Shuffle" Released: 23 June 2011; 2. "Lights Out, Words Gone" Released: 14 October 2011; 3. "Leave It" Released: 1 January 2012; 4. "How Can You Swallow So Much Sleep" Released: 5 March 2012; 5. "Beg" Released: 9 July 2012

Professional ratings
Aggregate scores
Source	Rating
Metacritic	77/100
Review scores
Source	Rating
Blare	3.5/5 stars
The Daily Telegraph	4/5 stars
Financial Times	4/5 stars
BBC	Positive
Rockfreaks.net	7.5/10 stars
Pitchfork Media	7.0/10
Paste Magazine	7.1/10
Rokoed	7.0/10 stars
The Guardian	3/5 stars
Allmusic	3.5/5 stars

A Different Kind of Fix is the third studio album by the English indie rock band Bombay Bicycle Club. It was released on 26 August 2011 by Island Records in the United Kingdom and 17 January 2012 on A&M/Octone Records in the United States.

== Singles ==
- "Shuffle" was the first single released from the album, on 23 June 2011. It peaked at number 69 on the UK Singles Chart.
- "Lights Out, Words Gone" was the second single, released on 14 October 2011.
- "Leave It" was the third single, released on 2 January 2012.
- "How Can You Swallow So Much Sleep" was the fourth single, released on 5 March 2012. Directed by Anna Ginsburg, the video for "How Can You Swallow So Much Sleep" is an 'epic' journey of a little boy who one night dreams of going to the Moon. The video was inspired by a story in the Cosmicomics by Italo Calvino.
- The non-album single "Beg" was released on 9 July 2012.

== Track listing ==
All tracks are written by Jack Steadman.

No.	Title	Length
1.	"How Can You Swallow So Much Sleep"	3:30
2.	"Bad Timing"	3:34
3.	"Your Eyes"	5:21
4.	"Lights Out, Words Gone"	5:01
5.	"Take the Right One"	3:36
6.	"Shuffle"	3:54
7.	"Beggars"	4:12
8.	"Leave It"	3:54
9.	"Fracture"	4:04
10.	"What You Want"	4:20
11.	"Favourite Day"	4:57
12.	"Still"	4:25
13.	"Beg" (Bonus track)	3:52

== Personnel ==
- Jack Steadman - lead vocals, guitar, piano
- Jamie MacColl - guitar
- Ed Nash - bass guitar
- Suren de Saram - drums
- Lucy Rose - backing vocals

== Chart performance ==
=== Weekly charts ===
Chart (2011–12)	Peak position
Austrian Albums (Ö3 Austria)	65
Belgian Heatseekers Albums (Ultratop Flanders)	6
Belgian Albums (Ultratop Wallonia)	97
Dutch Alternative Albums (MegaCharts)	19
German Albums (Offizielle Top 100)	84
Irish Albums (IRMA)	18
Scottish Albums (Official Charts)	8
UK Albums (Official Charts)	6
US Heatseekers Albums (Billboard)	29

=== Year-end charts ===
Chart (2011)	Position
UK Albums (OCC)	172

As of January 2012, UK sales stand at 80,000 copies, according to The Guardian.

== Release history ==
Region	Date	Format	Label
Australia	26 August 2011	Digital download	Island Records
France	26 August 2011	Digital download	Island Records
Germany	26 August 2011	Digital download	Island Records
Ireland	26 August 2011	Digital download	Island Records
New Zealand	26 August 2011	Digital download	Island Records
Spain	26 August 2011	Digital download	Island Records
United Kingdom	26 August 2011	Digital download	Island Records
United Kingdom	29 August 2011	CD	Island Records
