= How We Are =

EP by Bombay Bicycle Club
- Released: 29 October 2007
- Recorded: (United Kingdom) Chapel Studios, Lincolnshire
- Genre: Indie rock Indie pop
- Length: 15:21
- Label: Mmm... Recordings (Self-published)
- Producer: Jim Abbiss

Bombay Bicycle Club chronology
The Boy I Used to Be (2007)	How We Are (2007)	I Had the Blues But I Shook Them Loose (2009)

How We Are was the second EP by Bombay Bicycle Club, released in 2007. It was released to download, on CD and as a limited edition 7" vinyl.

== Release ==
The band self-released the EP on their own label, Mmm... Records. It reached #2 in the UK Indie Charts, with the Super Furry Animals single "Run-Away" at #1.

== Track listing ==
All lyrics are written by Jack Steadman; all music is composed by Bombay Bicycle Club

No.	Title	Length
1.	"How Are You"	4:06
2.	"Ghost"	3:32
3.	"Maybe More"	4:09
4.	"Pedestal"	3:34
