= Notes from the Outernet =

2011 book by Jared Leto

- Two volumes
- Author: Jared Leto
- Language: English
- Publication date: November 2011
- Publication place: United States
- Media type: Print (hardcover)

Notes from the Outernet is a 2011 limited edition book of intimate photographs taken by Jared Leto around the world throughout 2009 and 2010. It includes previously unreleased photos from his personal collection. It was launched in November 2011. Signed and numbered copies of the book were available for pre-order from January 2011. Leto also launched a Notes from the Outernet website featuring information, pictures, and multimedia materials in the field of art, music, lifestyles, and popular culture.

On January 30, 2012, Notes from the Outernet received a nomination in the category of Best Book at the 2012 NME Awards.
