= Upside Down: The Creation Records Story =

- Directed by: Danny O'Connor
- Produced by: Danny O'Connor
- Starring: Oasis; Primal Scream; My Bloody Valentine; Ride; Super Furry Animals; Teenage Fanclub; Jesus & Mary Chain
- Cinematography: Daryl Chase
- Edited by: Jonny Halifax
- Music by: Mark Gardener
- Production company: Document Productions
- Distributed by: Revolver Entertainment
- Release date: 23 October 2010 (BFI London Film Festival)
- Running time: 101 minutes
- Country: United Kingdom
- Language: English

Upside Down: The Creation Records Story is a 2010 film by Document Productions which charts the story of Creation Records. Directed by Danny O'Connor, the film features Alan McGee, Noel Gallagher, Bobby Gillespie, Mark Gardener and more.

== Info ==
Over a quarter of a century since it began and a decade after it folded, this is the definitive story of Creation Records, which operated under the stewardship of Alan McGee between 1984 and 1999.

The film has toured extensively to critical acclaim at a host of film and music Festivals worldwide including South by Southwest in Austin, Texas, Glastonbury, Berlin and Tokyo.

The film won the annual Mojo Vision Award at the Glenfiddich Mojo Honours in July 2011.
