= Flaws (album) =

Studio album by Bombay Bicycle Club
- Released: 9 July 2010
- Recorded: February 2009 – February 2010; The Church, Crouch End, London
- Genre: Indie folk
- Length: 33:26
- Label: Island
- Producers: Neil MacColl, Jack Steadman

Bombay Bicycle Club chronology
| I Had the Blues But I Shook Them Loose (2009) | Flaws (2010) | iTunes Festival: London 2010 (2010) |

Singles from Flaws
- 1. "Ivy & Gold"/"Flaws" Released: 9 May 2010; 2. "Rinse Me Down"/"Dorcas" Released: 20 September 2010

Flaws is the second studio album by the English indie rock band Bombay Bicycle Club, released on 9 July 2010 by Island Records. Unlike the band's previous releases, the album is entirely acoustic music, consisting of versions of their own tracks as well as cover versions of other artists. The album was produced in part by the guitarist Jamie MacColl's father, Neil MacColl, with recording taking place in February 2009 at The Church in Crouch End, London. The band started work on the album after completing their first album, I Had the Blues But I Shook Them Loose.

== Recording ==
Initial talks about an acoustic release began in February 2009, with the band confirming through MySpace that they were recording an acoustic EP in the Lake District, while continuing to promote their first album. Following the completion of their first album during the same month, the band regrouped at The Church, a recording studio in Crouch End, London. The album was produced in part by Neil MacColl, guitarist MacColl's father. The rest of the album's production was completed by the vocalist Jack Steadman in his bedroom. In an interview with the Daily Record on 6 February 2010, the band revealed that they had completed recording the album, with MacColl confirming "[it's] hopefully going to come out in May or June".

The album was completed in entirely acoustic music. Tracks include reworked versions of some of the band's previous releases, alongside original tracks and cover versions of songs by other artists. The track "Dust on the Ground" was previously recorded on the band's first album, I Had the Blues.., and was released as the album's lead single on 29 June 2009. "Jewel" had also been previously released, as a B-side to the 2010 single "Evening/Morning". "Fairytale Lullaby" is a cover of a song by the late John Martyn (then titled "Fairy Tale Lullaby"), from his first album London Conversation. "Swansea", the final track on the album, is a reworked version of the Joanna Newsom track of the same name.

== Promotion and release ==
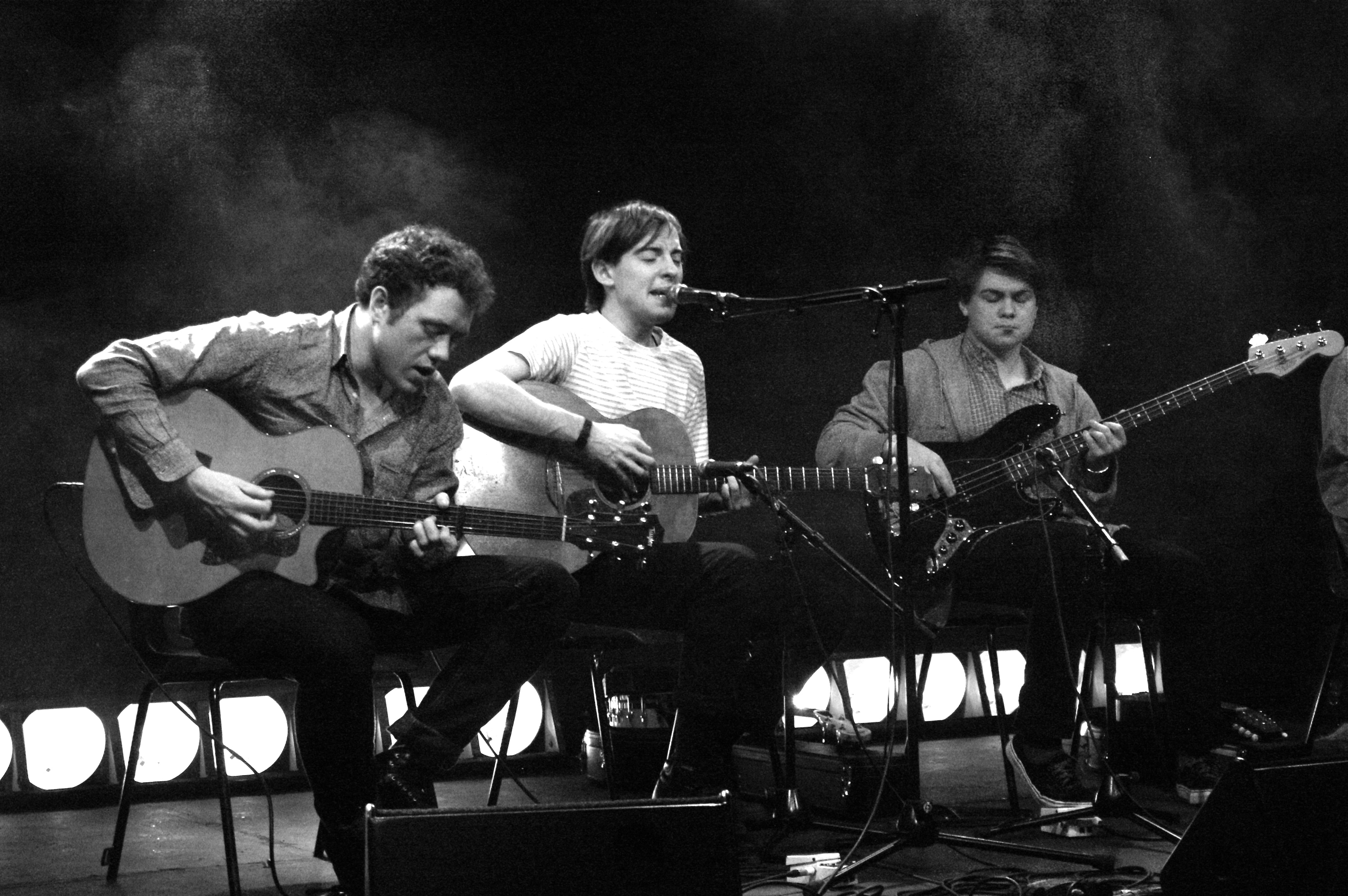
Bombay Bicycle Club performing acoustically during the NME Awards Tour, 9 February 2010.

On 2 June 2009, the band supported Starsailor at the Union Chapel in London, performing an acoustic concert in aid of the homelessness charity Crisis. During the set, the band aired acoustic versions of "Flaws" and "Ivy & Gold". Later in the same month, the band embarked on the "Tour For Lulu" throughout June and July 2009, performing four dates in the United Kingdom at locations chosen by fans. The tour was possible because the band had a number of days off in between recording. One location on the tour was a beach hut in Hengistbury Head, with the band including a cover version of Joy Division's "Love Will Tear Us Apart". The album was confirmed for release on 12 July 2010 in the United Kingdom, on CD and vinyl.

Flaws was preceded by a 7-inch vinyl of "Ivy & Gold" and title track "Flaws", released on 5 July 2010. Zane Lowe named "Ivy & Gold" his "Hottest Record in the World" on 12 May 2010, an acclaim given to "Jewel" and ..Blues.. single "Magnet" previously. "Ivy & Gold" was also A-listed in the BBC Radio 1 playlist. As well as this, the band announced a seven date tour of the United Kingdom, with most performances taking place in churches. All dates were performed acoustically. The band also confirmed through Twitter that a video was to be recorded for each track, with "Flaws", "Ivy & Gold", "Swansea" and "Dust on the Ground" in circulation before the album's release. A deluxe version of the album, released through the online retailer Play.com, includes a DVD containing the videos.

== Reception ==
Professional ratings
Aggregate scores
| Source | Rating |
|---|---|
| Metacritic | 63/100 |
Review scores
| Source | Rating |
| AllMusic | 3.5/5 stars |
| BBC Music | (favourable) |
| Drowned In Sound | (6/10) |
| The Guardian | 3/5 stars |
| NME | (8/10) |
| Pitchfork | (4.0/10) |
| PopMatters | 6/10 stars |

Flaws received a mixed reception from critics. The review aggregator Metacritic gave the album a normalised rating of 63, based on 12 critics, indicating "generally favorable reviews". Tessa Harris of NME praised the record for being more than an "acoustic diversion" for the band, highlighting the covers that show their ready to remove the "young-indie-upstarts label", concluding that "They've proved themselves to be a band who defy convention with an album stuffed full of subtle invention and an emotional intensity that you really wouldn't expect from a band still too young to grow a beard between them." Mark Deming of AllMusic praised Steadman and MacColl for having "melodically strong and lyrically intelligent" material throughout the album and the former's performance for exuding dramatic flair and multiple moods, concluding that "Flaws sounds like a detour rather than a bold step in a new direction, but it speaks volumes about the strength and intelligence of Bombay Bicycle Club's songwriting; these tunes are impressive even as played by two guys with banjos and guitars in someone's bedroom, a trick not every band can pull off."

April Clare Welsh of Drowned in Sound was critical of the covers being "disappointingly safe" and Lucy Rose's performance on the title track being "overly saccharine and contrived" but commended the band for showing their musical abilities through a "minimal aesthetic", concluding that "Flaws is perfectly executed and well produced and if you inhale the album in short, sharp breaths, then you may just find the middle of the road a charming place to be, for a brief moment anyway." PopMatters contributor Max Feldman felt a "sense of displacement" throughout the record, noting a lack of "logical progression" for the band's soundscape between projects but gave credit to Steadman's folksy musicianship on tracks like "Dust on the Ground" and "Leaving Blues", concluding that, "[I]t's far more original then any of their previous efforts. However, where Flaws diverges so far from what we expect, it's likely that any further experimentation would make the band lose focus entirely." Joshua Love of Pitchfork commended the album's production and instrumentation on tracks like "Rinse Me Down" and "Many Ways" but criticized Steadman for not having a distinct voice and providing said tracks with "empty floridity and moody romanticism."

On 19 April 2011, it was announced that Flaws had been nominated for the 2011 Ivor Novello award for best album.

== Track listing ==
All tracks are written by Jack Steadman, except where noted.

| No. | Title | Length |
|---|---|---|
| 1. | "Rinse Me Down" | 3:10 |
| 2. | "Many Ways" | 2:44 |
| 3. | "Dust on the Ground" | 4:03 |
| 4. | "Ivy & Gold" | 2:56 |
| 5. | "Leaving Blues" | 2:56 |
| 6. | "Fairytale Lullaby" (cover of "Fairy Tale Lullaby"; John Martyn) | 2:20 |
| 7. | "Word by Word" | 2:38 |
| 8. | "Jewel" | 3:04 |
| 9. | "My God" | 2:26 |
| 10. | "Flaws" (feat. Lucy Rose) | 2:57 |
| 11. | "Swansea" (Joanna Newsom cover; feat. Lucy Rose) | 4:14 |

== Personnel ==
- Jack Steadman – lead vocals, guitar
- Jamie MacColl – guitar
- Ed Nash – bass guitar
- Suren de Saram – drums
- Lucy Rose – backing vocals

== Charts ==
Chart performance for Flaws
| Chart (2010) | Peak position |
|---|---|
| Irish Albums (IRMA) | 95 |
| Scottish Albums (Official Charts) | 14 |
| UK Albums (Official Charts) | 8 |

== Certifications ==
| Region | Certification | Certified units/sales |
|---|---|---|
| United Kingdom (BPI) | Gold | 100,000^{^} |
^{^} Shipments figures based on certification alone.^{‡} Sales+streaming figures based on certification alone.
