= Shuffle (song) =

Single by Bombay Bicycle Club

from the album A Different Kind of Fix
- Released: 23 June 2011
- Recorded: 2010
- Genre: Alternative rock, indie folk
- Length: 3:54
- Label: Island
- Songwriter(s): Jack Steadman

Bombay Bicycle Club singles chronology
"Rinse Me Down" (2010)	"Shuffle" (2011)	"Lights Out, Words Gone" (2011)

"Shuffle", by British alternative rock band Bombay Bicycle Club, is the first single released from their third studio album, A Different Kind of Fix. Through Island Records, the single was released on 23 June 2011 as a digital download in the United Kingdom. The song was chosen as "Record of The Week" by UK radio DJ Zane Lowe. "Shuffle" would become one of the band's most commercially successful singles.

== Commercial performance ==
"Shuffle" peaked at number 64 on the UK Singles Chart, becoming the band's second-most successful single. The single also debuted at number 40 and peaked at number 38 on the Billboard Alternative Songs chart in the United States, the band's first chart appearance in that country. The song also charted at number 60 on the Billboard Japan Hot 100 Singles chart.

== Music video ==
The music video was uploaded to VEVO and YouTube on 22 July 2011. It features Lucy Rose, a fellow artist who is friends with the band. With over three million views, it is the band's most viewed video on YouTube and VEVO to date.

== In popular culture ==
The song is featured in the 2012 video game Sleeping Dogs and in the 2013 video game MLB 13: The Show. The song was featured in one episode of MTV series Catfish: The TV Show.

== Track listing ==
Digital download - Single
No.	Title	Length
1.	"Shuffle"	3:54

Digital download - Remixes
No.	Title	Length
1.	"Shuffle" (Jack Steadman Remix)	4:46
2.	"Shuffle" (Bibio Remix)	4:55
3.	"Shuffle" (Leo Zero Remix)	5:56

== Chart performance ==
Chart (2011–12)	Peak position
Japan (Japan Hot 100)	60
Switzerland Airplay (Schweizer Hitparade)	94
UK Singles (OCC)	64
US Alternative Songs (Billboard)	38

== Certifications and sales ==
Region	Certification	Certified units/sales
United Kingdom (BPI)	Silver	200,000^{‡}
^{‡} Sales+streaming figures based on certification alone.

== Release history ==
Region	Date	Format	Label
United Kingdom	23 June 2011	Digital download - Single	Mercury Records
United Kingdom	5 August 2011	Digital download - Remixes	Mercury Records
