= The Boy I Used to Be =

EP by Bombay Bicycle Club
- Released: 12 February 2007
- Recorded: (United Kingdom) Chapel Studios, Lincolnshire, 2006
- Genre: Indie rock Indie pop
- Length: 16:36
- Label: Mmm... Recordings (self-published)
- Producer: Jim Abbiss

Bombay Bicycle Club chronology
The Boy I Used to Be (2007)	How We Are (2007)

The Boy I Used to Be is the first extended play (EP) by Bombay Bicycle Club, released in 2007. It was released on CD and 1,000 limited edition numbered 10-inch vinyl. 500 vinyl copies were also pressed by the independent record label Nettwerk. It was the band's first release since winning Channel 4's "Road to V" competition, where they won the opportunity to be the opening act at the 2006 V Festival.

== Recording ==
The EP was recorded in late-2006 at Chapel Studios in Lincolnshire with the music producer Jim Abbiss, who had previously worked with Arctic Monkeys and Kasabian. It contained tracks that were re-recordings of demos that the band had performed in their bedrooms.

== Release ==
The band self-released the EP on their own label, Mmm... Records, despite receiving numerous record label offers following the "Road to V" competition. In an interview with The Independent, the band stated that this was because they wanted to gain more experience in the industry first.

== Track listing ==
All lyrics are written by Jack Steadman; all music is composed by Bombay Bicycle Club.

No.	Title	Length
1.	"The Hill"	4:05
2.	"Sixteen"	4:08
3.	"Open House"	3:02
4.	"Cancel On Me"	5:21
