= Always Like This =

Single by Bombay Bicycle Club

from the album I Had the Blues But I Shook Them Loose
- Released: 13 April 2009
- Recorded: 2008
- Genre: Indie pop, post-punk revival
- Length: 4:05
- Label: Island
- Songwriter: Jack Steadman
- Producer: Jim Abbiss

Bombay Bicycle Club singles chronology
"Evening/Morning" (2008)	"Always Like This" (2009)	"Dust on the Ground" (2009)
"Magnet" (2009)	"Always Like This" (2009)	"Evening/Morning" (2010)

Alternative Cover

"Always Like This" is the second single from Bombay Bicycle Club, and the first from their debut album I Had the Blues But I Shook Them Loose. The single was released on 13 April 2009 and is available on 7" vinyl, 12" vinyl and download. The single was produced by Jim Abbiss, and the limited 12" includes remixes by Tim Goldsworthy and James Rutledge. It reached #97 on the UK Singles Chart on 25 April 2009, becoming the group's first single to reach the British pop chart.

== Track listing ==
1. "Always Like This"
2. "Always Like This (Thee Loving Hand Remix by Tim Goldsworthy)"
3. "Always Like This (James Rutledge Remix)"
4. "Never Like That"

== Second release ==
It was re-released on the 22 November 2009 as an EP with two new remixes and an alternative version of the original single.

=== Track listing ===
1. "Always Like This"
2. "Always Like This (Pariah Remix)"
3. "Always Like This (Lee Mortimer Remix)"
4. "Always Like This (Bombay Bicycle Club vs. London School of Samba)"

== Covers ==
A cover version of "Always Like This" was released by Austrian electronic music duo HVOB in 2013.

== Certifications ==
Region	Certification	Certified units/sales
New Zealand (RMNZ)	Gold	15,000^{‡}
United Kingdom (BPI)	Platinum	600,000^{‡}
^{‡} Sales+streaming figures based on certification alone.
