= London Conversation =

Studio album by John Martyn
- Released: October 1967
- Recorded: Tony Pike's studio, Putney, London
- Genres: Folk, folk rock
- Label: Island
- Producers: Theo Johnson; Supervised by Chris Blackwell

John Martyn chronology
London Conversation (1967)	The Tumbler (1968)

Professional ratings
Review scores
Source	Rating
AllMusic	link
Mojo	3/5 stars

London Conversation is the first album by John Martyn, released on Island Records in 1967. Largely self-penned, the album is much more folk oriented than his blues/jazz tinged later releases. Recording was completed by 9 August and the album was released when Martyn was 19 in October 1967. The album reputedly cost £158 to record. The cover photo was taken by Barry Wentzel on the roof of Island Records boss Chris Blackwell's flat in Cromwell Road, London.

== Track listing ==
All tracks composed by John Martyn except where indicated.

Side one

1. "Fairy Tale Lullaby" – 2:50
2. "Sandy Grey" (Robin Frederick) – 2:25
3. "London Conversation" (Martyn, Jon Sundell) – 2:42
4. "Ballad of an Elder Woman" – 2:43
5. "Cocain" (Traditional; arranged by Martyn) – 2:59
6. "Run Honey Run" – 2:37

Side two

1. "Back to Stay" – 3:28
2. "Rolling Home" – 5:43
3. "Who's Grown Up Now" – 4:01
4. "Golden Girl" – 2:34
5. "This Time" – 3:07
6. "Don't Think Twice" (Bob Dylan) – 4:11

Bonus track on 2005 CD reissue

1. "She Moved Through the Fair" (Traditional) – 2:33

== Personnel ==
- John Martyn - vocals, guitar, sitar, harmonica
