= Anna Ginsburg =

British film director

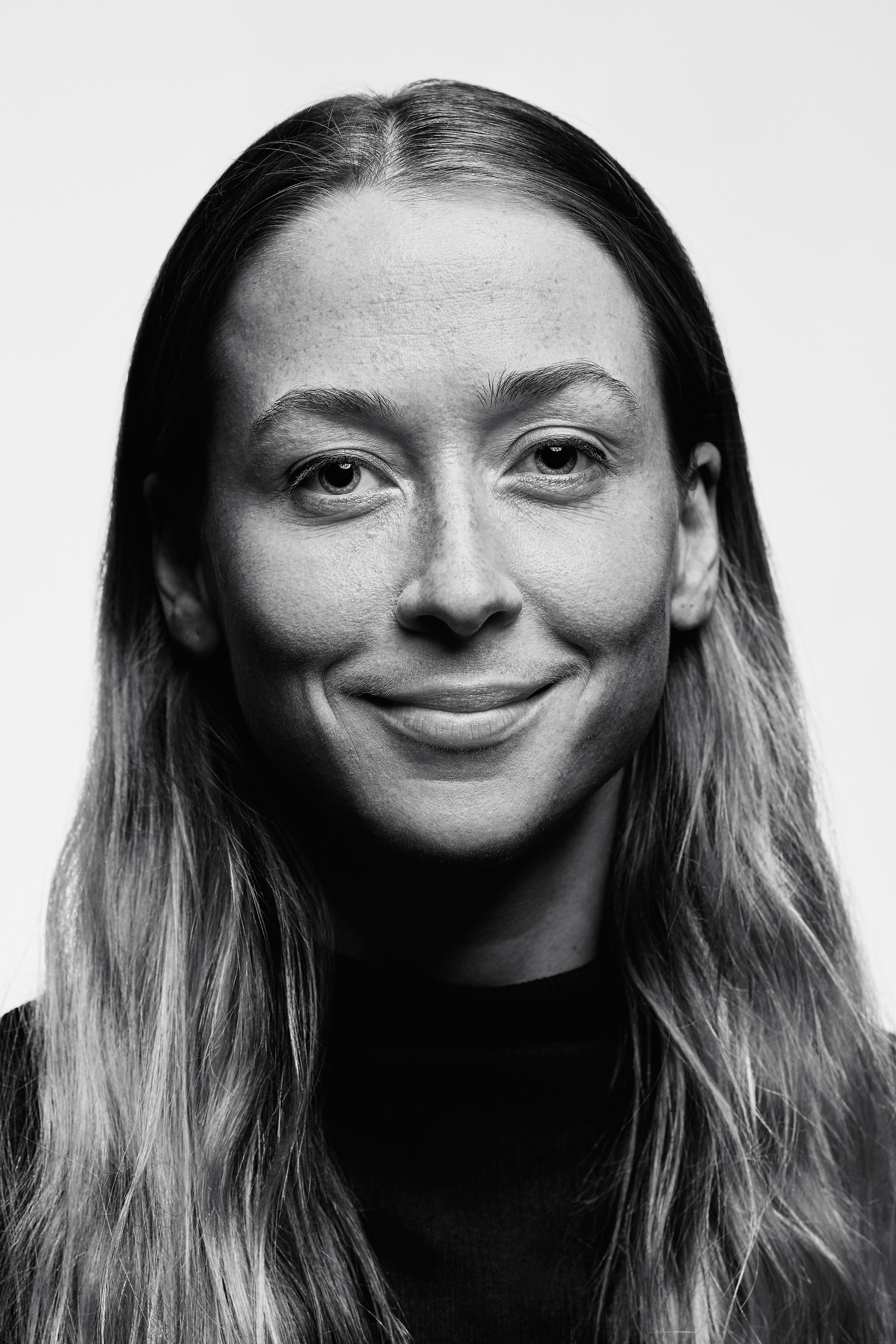
Anna Ginsburg in 2019

Anna Ginsburg is a British film director working with a range of techniques and mediums, including traditional hand drawn 2D animation, stop-motion, as well as live-action.

== Biography ==
Ginsburg grew up in Kentish Town and attended Camberwell College of Arts for her foundation degree and the Edinburgh College of Art where she studied animation, and graduated in 2012. She is frequently collaborating with illustrators and artists, such as Sara Andreasson, Caitlin McCarthy and Melissa Kitty Jarram.

Ginsburg has worked on many independent animated films that have received awards, including a music video, How Can You Swallow So Much Sleep?, that won a BAFTA at the National Talent Awards. She has also received an ADC Young Guns award as well as a British Arrows award for her work on Material World.

== Filmography ==
- Private Parts (2016)
- Selfridges and Sustainability (2017)
- Material World (2017)
- Ugly (2019)
- Hag (2026)
