= Bombay Bicycle Club =

English indie rock band

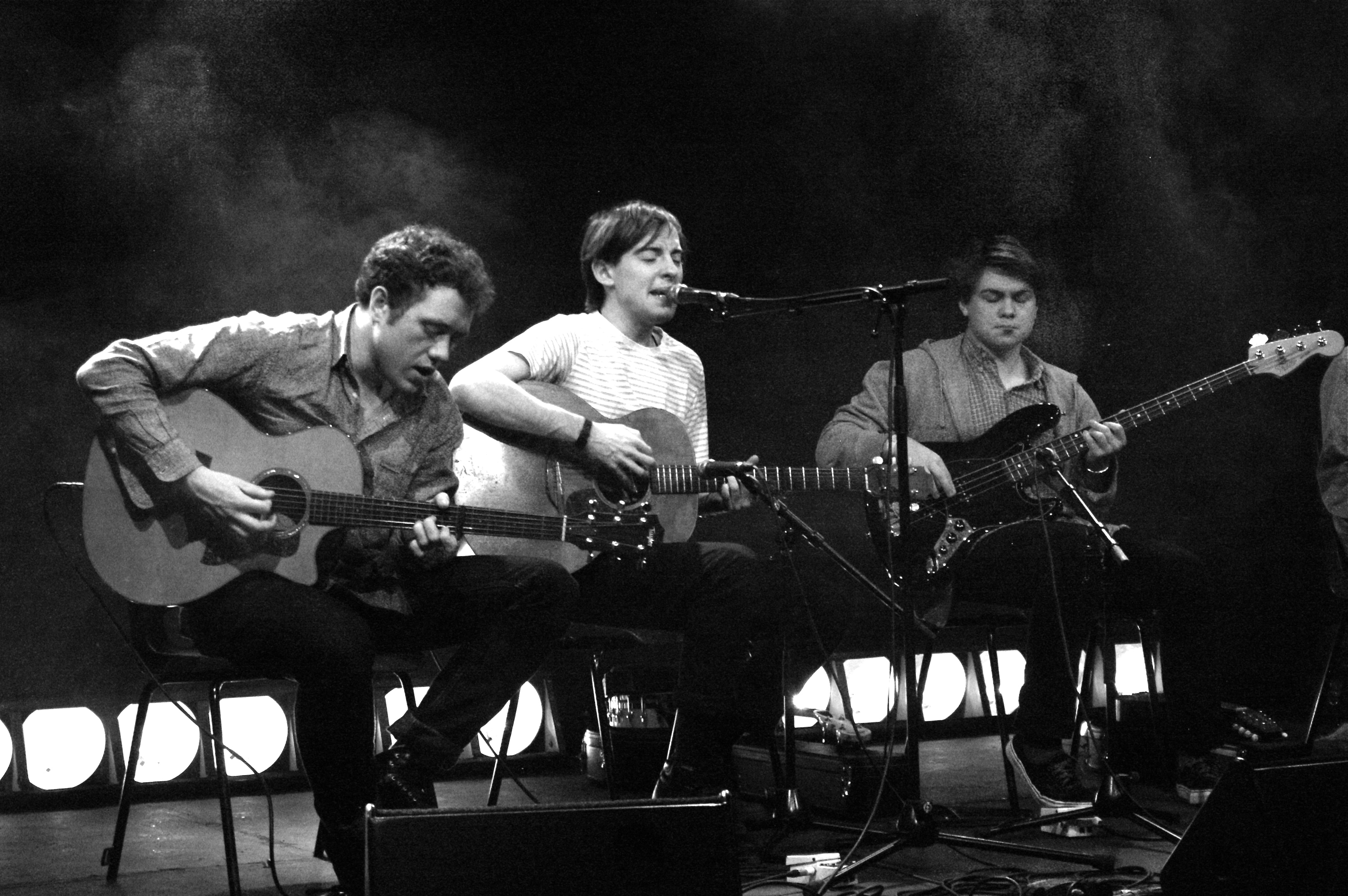
- Bombay Bicycle Club playing at the University of Nottingham

Background information
- Origin: London, England
- Genres: Indie rock; indie folk; post-punk revival
- Years active: 2005–2016, 2019–present
- Label: Island
- Members: Suren de Saram; Jamie MacColl; Ed Nash; Jack Steadman
- Website: bombaybicycle.club

Bombay Bicycle Club are an English indie rock band from Crouch End, London, consisting of Jack Steadman, Jamie MacColl, Suren de Saram, and Ed Nash. They are guitar-fronted and have experimented with different genres, including folk, electronica, world music and indie rock.

The band was given the opening slot on 2006's V Festival after winning a competition. They subsequently released two EPs and their debut single "Evening/Morning". Since then, the band has released six albums including So Long, See You Tomorrow which topped the album charts in February 2014. The band has toured worldwide as a headlining act, playing North America, Australia, Europe and Asia.

In January 2016, the four members announced that they would pursue solo projects. Nash recorded music under the name Toothless, and released his debut album in early 2017. Frontman Steadman, under the name Mr Jukes, released his debut album in 2017.

In January 2019, Bombay Bicycle Club announced their return to making new music and performing live after a three-year hiatus: "Since late last year we've been getting back into the swing of playing music together. More than anything it just felt great to be in the same room playing again. It made us realise what a good thing we have and has given us renewed energy and enthusiasm for the future".

== History ==
=== Beginnings (2005–2006) ===
Steadman, MacColl (son of former Bible/Liberty Horses guitarist/producer/session player Neill MacColl, nephew of singer Kirsty MacColl and grandson of folk singers Ewan MacColl and Peggy Seeger) and de Saram (son of Sri Lankan cellist Rohan de Saram) met at age 15 as students at University College School, Hampstead (in the same year as the members of the band Cajun Dance Party), and began playing under the name The Canals after performing together in a school assembly, with an additional keyboardist. They switched between various aliases until they picked Bombay Bicycle Club, named after a (now defunct) chain of Indian restaurants in North London. The line-up changed regularly until the summer of 2006, when Nash (a student at Camden School for Girls), joined the band after they met him at a funeral. Initially they played gigs at small London venues such as The Old Blue Last, Lark in the Park and Jacksons Lane. They released demos of their music on Myspace, with early versions of "The Hill" and "Autumn" as well as the song, "City Lights".

The band was entered into Virgin Mobile's "Road to V" competition on Channel 4 in 2006. They were announced as one of two winners of the competition on 16 August 2006, beating competition from fellow London band - and favourites to win the competition - The Holloways in the final round of fourteen bands. Previous participants include The Young Knives, who were winners of the inaugural competition one year before. They were given the opening slot of the 2006 V Festival, playing on the Channel 4 Stage in Chelmsford on 19 August, before opening the Staffordshire site the following day.

=== The Boy I Used to Be and How We Are (2007–2008) ===
On 16 May 2007, NME published an article naming Bombay Bicycle Club "...the hottest band to come from North London for quite some time". Bombay Bicycle Club released their debut EP, The Boy I Used to Be, on 12 February 2007. The band released it on their own independent record label, Mmm... Records. The EP was produced by Jim Abbiss at his own personal request, and was recorded and mixed by Ewan Davies at Lincolnshire's Chapel Studios. To support the release of the EP they played a headline show at the Dingwalls in Camden as well as supporting fellow "Road to V" winners The Young Knives across some of their UK Tour. The band also played the Carling Stage at Reading and Leeds Festivals in 2007.

The band's second EP, How We Are, was released on 22 October 2007, again through Mmm... Records. It was produced by Jim Abbiss, and recorded and mixed by Richard Wilkinson at Konk Studios. The band headlined their first UK tour in support of this release and the EP debuted at No. 2 on the UK Indie Singles Chart on 5 November 2007.

At the beginning of 2008, Bombay Bicycle Club appeared at the third annual Artrocker Festival, the Camden Crawl, and The Great Escape Festival in Brighton. The band also played the Shockwaves NME Awards Show at London's KOKO where they were main support for The Hold Steady.

=== I Had the Blues But I Shook Them Loose (2008–2009) ===
In June 2008, all current members of the band finished secondary school education, which meant that they could commit full-time to music – and enjoy freedom from the conflicting responsibilities of being in a band versus education. The band also headlined the first Club NME in Paris at La Fleche D'or venue, where they were supported by Bitchee Bitchee Ya Ya Ya, with DJ sets from South Central, Shitdisco and Vicarious Bliss.

The band's first single, "Evening/Morning", was released on 4 August 2008 through Young and Lost Club. The single was produced by Jim Abbiss and was recorded and mixed by Richard Wilkinson at The Garden, London. The band embarked on a 23 date UK tour in July and August, including festival appearances at the 2008 Reading and Leeds Festivals, the 2008 T in the Park Festival, The Edge Festival in Edinburgh, Scotland and the second Underage Festival.

In September 2008, Bombay Bicycle Club took part in the Levi's Ones to Watch 5 Night Revue at The Macbeth in London. The band headlined the first night with support from Sky Larkin and an interview and highlights from the show were broadcast on Channel 4 on 9 October 2008.

Bombay Bicycle Club's debut album I Had the Blues But I Shook Them Loose was recorded between late October and late November 2008 at Konk Studios in London. The album was produced by Jim Abbiss. The band also played the Levi's Ones To Watch tour at the end of October, which included dates in Brighton, London, Birmingham, Liverpool, and Glasgow.

At the end of 2008, Bombay Bicycle Club signed a deal with Island Records to release future singles and albums with the record label. All releases were to be published through the Mmm...Records/Island Records offprint, the first release being the single "Always Like This". The single was released in April 2009 and reached No. 97 on the UK Singles Chart. The band toured throughout April in support of the release.

Speaking to The Indiependent in 2020, Nash said: "I would say it's probably our most honest record, and a very good account of being aged 14 to 18."

=== Flaws (2010–2011) ===
On 9 May 2010, Bombay Bicycle Club released the track "Ivy & Gold" in the United Kingdom as a digital download. The single, which was released as a double A-part with the track "Flaws" served as the lead single from their second studio album; Flaws. Having been added to BBC Radio 1's A Playlist, the single debuted on the singles chart at No. 97, climbing to No. 56 the following week; marking the band's most successful single to date.

The band released Flaws in the United Kingdom on 12 July 2010; where it debuted on the UK Albums Chart at No. 8; beating the debut's peak of No. 46. The album included 11 acoustically recorded tracks, including "Swansea" (a cover of the Joanna Newsom song that appears on her album The Milk-Eyed Mender); and "Fairytale Lullaby" (a cover of the John Martyn song that appears on the album London Conversation). On 10 December, the album was certified Silver by the British Phonographic Industry for selling over 60,000 copies.

On 20 September 2010, the band released the second single "Rinse Me Down" as a music download and 7" vinyl alongside a track entitled "Dorcas", which served as the second A-side. The single managed to reach Radio 1's B Playlist, although failed to chart in the UK.

On 19 April 2011, Flaws was nominated for the 2011 Ivor Novello Award for best album.

=== A Different Kind of Fix (2011–2012) ===
In September 2010, the band began working on their third studio album, returning to electric guitars following acoustic recordings for Flaws. On 7 June 2011, Zane Lowe revealed on BBC Radio 1 that their new album would be called A Different Kind of Fix. He also said that he would be playing a new song from the album, entitled "Shuffle", on 22 June before its release as a single the following day. The single reached No. 69 in the charts. The album was released on 29 August 2011 and included 12 tracks. "Beg" rounded off the album as its final release on 9 July 2012. The track failed to make the original physical version of the album but was available as a bonus track on the digital version. Lucy Rose sang on A Different Kind of Fix, but the band recruited Amber Wilson instead for their 2012 tour due to Lucy's solo project. Louis Bhose, a keyboardist also joined the group.

Bombay Bicycle Club won the Best New Band award at the 2010 NME Awards on 24 February. In June 2010, their song "How Can You Swallow So Much Sleep" was included as a bonus track on The Twilight Saga: Eclipse soundtrack.

In 2011, a portrait of lead singer Steadman painted by British artist Joe Simpson was exhibited around the UK, including a solo exhibition at The Royal Albert Hall.

A Different Kind of Fix was released in the UK on 26 August 2011 and in the US on 17 January 2012.

Bombay Bicycle Club was among the bands chosen to perform at the BT London Live concert in Hyde Park, which marked the end of the 2012 London Summer Olympics.

=== So Long, See You Tomorrow (2013–2016) ===
On 4 November 2013, the band aired "Carry Me", the first single from their next album that was yet to be named, on BBC Radio 1. On the same night, an interactive video was released, which allowed viewers to manipulate the band members' actions. The album was released on 3 February 2014 and was followed by a tour. The new sounds of the album were influenced by Steadman's travels to the Netherlands, Turkey, and India. On 4 December 2013, the band announced that the new album would be called So Long, See You Tomorrow, with album artwork designed by La Boca.

On 10 December 2013, "It's Alright Now" was aired on BBC Radio 1.

On 6 January 2014, the band aired the album's third single, "Luna", on the Zane Lowe show, on BBC Radio 1. The single features solo artist Rae Morris and was accompanied by a music video. It also featured as soundtrack in Konami game, Pro Evolution Soccer 2015. The track also appeared in Forza Horizon 2.

On 3 February 2014, So Long, See You Tomorrow was released.

Their 2014 tour finished on 13 December at Earls Court Arena, this concert being the final event ever to take place there before its demolition. Pink Floyd member David Gilmour played with the band on their song "Rinse Me Down" before a performance of Pink Floyd's "Wish You Were Here".

On 29 January 2016, the band announced an indefinite hiatus, citing that "after ten years of doing this we thought it was time for all of us to try something else", with Steadman and Nash intending to record solo material.

=== Everything Else Has Gone Wrong (2019–2020) ===
On 14 January 2019, the band announced their return to making music and performing together, ending a three-year hiatus.

On 27 August 2019, the band released "Eat, Sleep, Wake (Nothing but You)" as the first song from their fifth studio album Everything Else Has Gone Wrong, which was released on 17 January 2020. A single with the same name of the album ("Everything Else Has Gone Wrong") was released on 27 November 2019. On 19 December 2019, the band released the album's third single, "Racing Stripes".

On 24 July 2020, the band released an EP titled Two Lives. The EP features three acoustic versions of songs from Everything Else Has Gone Wrong and a cover version of Bonnie Raitt's "Two Lives". It was recorded primarily at Steadman's house in quarantine during the COVID-19 pandemic. The band is donating all proceeds from the EP to the charities Chineke! Foundation and Youth Music. The EP was preceded by the singles "Let You Go (Acoustic)", "Racing Stripes (Acoustic)" and "Two Lives".

=== My Big Day (2023) ===
On 14 June 2023 the band announced the title and track list of their album My Big Day and released the video for the first single, also titled "My Big Day", which features Guinness World Record holder Johnny Strange. The album features guest appearances from Damon Albarn, Jay Som, Nilüfer Yanya, Chaka Khan and Holly Humberstone. It was produced by vocalist Jack Steadman with additional production from Paul Epworth, Ben H. Allen and mixed by Dave Fridmann. The album was released on 20 October 2023.

The band began a warm-up tour of the UK and Europe on 14 June 2023. Their performance at Alexandra Palace in London on 12 July 2024 was recorded and released as a live concert stream through On Air.

== Members ==
- Suren de Saram – drums
- Jamie MacColl – guitar
- Ed Nash – bass guitar
- Jack Steadman – lead vocals, guitar, piano

== Discography ==
- I Had the Blues But I Shook Them Loose (2009)
- Flaws (2010)
- A Different Kind of Fix (2011)
- So Long, See You Tomorrow (2014)
- Everything Else Has Gone Wrong (2020)
- My Big Day (2023)
