= I Had the Blues But I Shook Them Loose =

Studio album by Bombay Bicycle Club
- Released: 3 July 2009
- Recorded: October–November 2008; Konk Studios, London
- Genres: Indie rock, post-punk revival
- Length: 47:53
- Label: Island
- Producer: Jim Abbiss

Bombay Bicycle Club chronology
How We Are EP (2007)	I Had the Blues But I Shook Them Loose (2009)	Flaws (2010)

Singles from I Had The Blues But I Shook Them Loose
- 1. "Evening/Morning" Released: 6 August 2008; 2. "Always Like This" Released: 13 April 2009; 3. "Dust on the Ground" Released: 29 June 2009; 4. "Magnet" Released: 28 September 2009; 5. "Always Like This (re-release)" Released: 22 November 2009; 6. "Evening/Morning (re-release)" Released: 8 March 2010

I Had the Blues But I Shook Them Loose is the first album by the London indie rock band, Bombay Bicycle Club released on 3 July 2009. The band announced the title through MySpace and their official website on 31 March 2009. The album was recorded during October and November 2008, with the long-term producer Jim Abbiss. The title comes from a line in the song "After Hours" by A Tribe Called Quest, from their 1990 album People's Instinctive Travels and the Paths of Rhythm.

== Reception ==
Professional ratings
Aggregate scores
Source	Rating
Metacritic	61/100
Review scores
Source	Rating
AllMusic	3.5/5 stars
Artrocker	(favourable)
PopMatters	6/10 stars
BBC Music	(favourable)
Yahoo! Music	(7/10)
Drowned In Sound	(4/10)
The Fly	4.5/5 stars
The Guardian	3/5 stars
Gigwise	4/5 stars
NME	(8/10)

I Had the Blues... received a generally positive reception from critics. The review aggregator Metacritic gave the album a normalised rating of 61, based on 10 critics, indicating "generally favorable reviews". However, most if not all professional scores indicate the album was warmly received altogether.

== Track listing ==
All tracks are written by Jack Steadman.

No.	Title	Length
1.	"Emergency Contraception Blues"	1:27
2.	"Lamplight"	3:45
3.	"Evening/Morning"	2:55
4.	"Dust on the Ground"	4:24
5.	"Ghost"	3:57
6.	"Always Like This"	4:06
7.	"Magnet"	4:51
8.	"Cancel on Me"	5:29
9.	"Autumn"	3:35
10.	"The Hill"	3:57
11.	"What If"	4:10
12.	"The Giantess"	5:17
Total length:		47:53

== Charts ==
Chart performance for I Had the Blues But I Shook Them Loose
Chart (2009)	Peak position
Scottish Albums (Official Charts)	85
UK Albums (Official Charts)	46
