= Jack Steadman =

English singer-songwriter, musician, and record producer

Mr Jukes
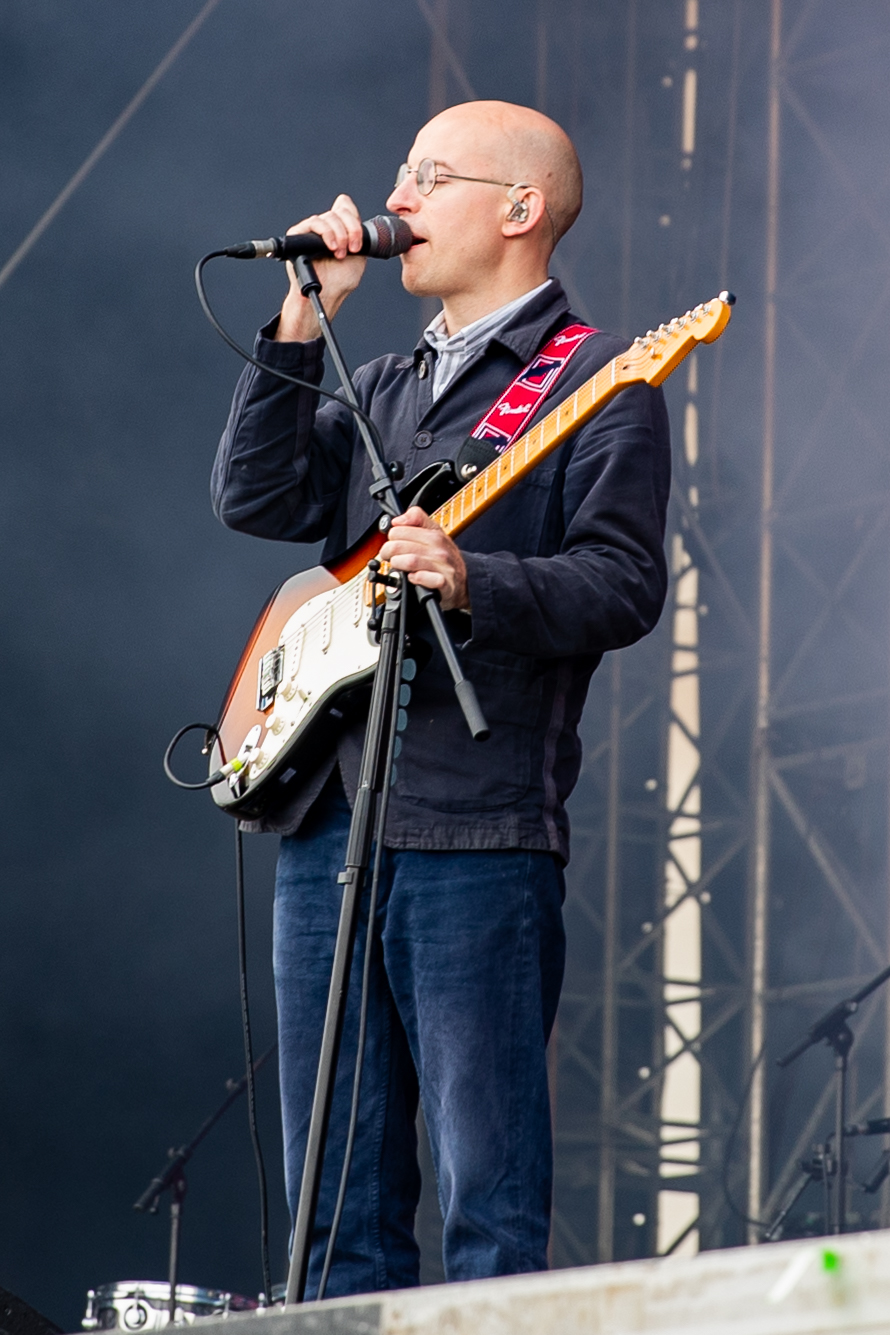
- Steadman at the Bombay Bicycle Club concert during Southside Festival 2024

Background information
- Born: Jack William Thomas Steadman; 1989 or 1990 (age 36–37)
- Origin: Hong Kong
- Genres: Indie rock; soul; funk
- Instruments: Vocals; guitar; keyboards; piano
- Years active: 2005–present
- Label: Island
- Website: jukesjukes.com

Jack Steadman (born 1989 or 1990), also known by the name of his solo project Mr Jukes (sometimes stylised as mr jukes), is an English singer-songwriter, musician, and record producer best known as the vocalist and primary songwriter of the indie rock band Bombay Bicycle Club since its formation in 2005. He released his debut album as Mr Jukes, God First, in 2017.

== Career ==
Bombay Bicycle Club announced a hiatus in January 2016 as the band members had decided to pursue their own individual projects. Steadman had embarked on a round-the-world trip without flying and recording his solo album. In Shanghai, Steadman boarded a cargo ship and set up a studio in his cabin and began writing his solo album.

The name Mr Jukes comes from a character in Joseph Conrad's Typhoon named Jukes, who was second in command on a ship heading into a typhoon. Steadman read the book while he was travelling on the cargo ship. The opening song of Mr Jukes' debut album is titled after the same novella.

On 21 March 2014, English singer/songwriter Sivu released the single "Can't Stop Now". The digital single included a remix by Mr Jukes.

Mr Jukes' debut album God First was released on 14 July 2017. Steadman drew inspiration from jazz, soul and funk to write the album, which features several collaborations, including with Lianne La Havas, Charles Bradley, De La Soul, Horace Andy, Lalah Hathaway, BJ the Chicago Kid.

In 2021, the collaborative project The Locket recorded by Steadman and Barney Artist was released. The London-based artist Barney Artist also contributed to God First's track "From Golden Stars Comes Silver Dew" (with Lalah Hathaway). The Locket features 10 tracks cut from sessions that span over 18 months, with its title track referring to memories of happier times: "we fill a locket with memories we protect, and don't forget to keep it round your neck". The record features two guest artists - Lex Amor on the sixth track "Autumn Leaves" and Kofi Stone on the eighth, titled "Check The Pulse".

== Discography ==
List of albums, with selected details
Title	Album details
God First	Released: 14 July 2017; Label: Island; Formats: CD, LP, digital download
The Locket (with Barney Artist)	Released: 6 August 2021; Label: Locket / Virgin Music International; Formats: CD, LP, digital download
