= Bide Your Time =

Bide Your Time may refer to:

- Bide Your Time (EP) debut extended play (EP) by British indie rock band Billy Bibby & The Wry Smiles 2016
- "Bide Your Time", song by The Courteeners from Here Come the Young Men and St. Jude (album)
- "Bide Your Time", song by The Judes
