= Something's Changing =

Studio album by Lucy Rose
- Released: July 7, 2017
- Length: 38:03
- Label: Communion Music

Lucy Rose chronology
Work It Out (2015)	Something's Changing (2017)	No Words Left (2019)

Professional ratings
Aggregate scores
Source	Rating
AnyDecentMusic?	6.6/10
Metacritic	68/100
Review scores
Source	Rating
Albumism	5/5 stars
AllMusic	4/5 stars
Paste	7.5/10
Spectrum Culture	3.5/5 stars

Something's Changing is the third studio album by English musician Lucy Rose. It was released in July 2017 under Communion Music.

== Track listing ==
No.	Title	Length
1.	"Intro"	1:44
2.	"Is This Called Home"	3:52
3.	"Strangest of Ways"	3:26
4.	"Floral Dresses"	2:34
5.	"Second Chance"	3:24
6.	"Love Song"	3:59
7.	"Soak It Up"	3:43
8.	"Moirai"	3:42
9.	"No Good at All"	3:44
10.	"Find Myself"	4:02
11.	"I Can't Change It All"	3:53

== Charts ==
Chart (2018)	Peak position
UK Albums (Official Charts)	34
