= Pacifier (song) =

Single by Catfish and the Bottlemen

from the album Kathleen and the Other Three and The Balcony
- Released: 1 December 2014
- Genre: Garage rock; post-punk revival
- Length: 3:58
- Label: Island; Communion
- Songwriter: Van McCann
- Producer: Jim Abbiss

Catfish and the Bottlemen singles chronology
"Cocoon" (2014)	"Pacifier" (2014)	"Hourglass" (2015)

Alternative cover
- The cover for the EP version of the single.

Music video
- "Pacifier" on YouTube

"Pacifier" is the sixth single by Welsh indie rock band Catfish and the Bottlemen. The song was the fourth and final track on their extended play, Kathleen and the Other Three and the fifth track on their debut studio album, The Balcony. The single was released on 1 December 2014. The single did not contain a B-side.

== Music video ==
The music video was exclusively released through Clash magazine on 3 October 2014. The band subsequently released the music video on their YouTube and Vevo pages on 5 October 2014.

== Track listing ==
All music is composed by Van McCann.

No.	Title	Length
1.	"Pacifier"	3:58
Total length:		3:58

== Certifications ==
Region	Certification	Certified units/sales
United Kingdom (BPI)	Platinum	600,000^{‡}
^{‡} Sales+streaming figures based on certification alone.
