= Rango (song) =

Single by Catfish and the Bottlemen

from the album Kathleen and the Other Three and The Balcony
- B-side: "Asa"
- Released: 13 August 2013 (digital); 16 September 2013 (7-inch)
- Genre: Alternative rock; post-punk revival
- Length: 5:26
- Label: Island; Communion
- Songwriter(s): Van McCann
- Producer(s): Jim Abbiss

Catfish and the Bottlemen singles chronology
"Homesick" (2013)	"Rango" (2013)	"Kathleen" (2014)

Music video
- "Rango" on YouTube

"Rango" is the second single by Welsh indie rock band Catfish and the Bottlemen. The song was included in their EP, Kathleen and the Other Three, and their debut studio album, The Balcony. The single was released on 13 August 2013.

== Lyrics ==
The song was about Van's first ever girlfriend, named Abby, whom the song is written for. McCann said he wrote the song when he was about 16. He described the relationship between him and Abby as one that didn't work out, although they remained friends and Van also stated in an interview that he wrote the song to try and get her back, but she did not like it. Then when it got on the radio she was flattered by it and wanted to get back together with him, but Van refused.

== Music video ==
The EP version of the music video was released on 3 September 2013. The video is an animation about a sperm cell named Rango who is determined to make a name for himself and be the fastest sperm to fertilize the egg. The video ends with Rango winning the race, where he is consumed by the egg. The video was directed by Pedro Chaves. Animation for the music video was done by Chaves, Turid Hoekstra and Dream Journey Studios.

== Track listing ==
All tracks are written by Van McCann.

No.	Title	Length
1.	"Rango"	2:58
2.	"Asa"	2:29
Total length:		5:26

== Critical reception ==
BBC's Tom Young praised the song as "glorious", and included it on his BBC playlist of upcoming artists. The Red Brick, the official student newspaper for the University of Birmingham described the song as intriguing.

== Certifications ==
Region	Certification	Certified units/sales
United Kingdom (BPI)	Silver	200,000^{‡}
^{‡} Sales+streaming figures based on certification alone.
