= 7 (Catfish and the Bottlemen song) =

Single by Catfish and the Bottlemen

from the album The Ride
- Released: 1 April 2016
- Genre: Alternative rock; garage rock; pop rock
- Length: 4:16
- Label: Island; Communion
- Songwriter: Van McCann
- Producer: Dave Sardy

Catfish and the Bottlemen singles chronology
"Soundcheck" (2016)	"7" (2016)	"Glasgow" (2016)

Music video
- "7" on YouTube

"7" is the ninth single by Welsh indie rock band Catfish and the Bottlemen. It is the second single of their second album, The Ride. It was released on 1 April 2016. The single did not contain a B-side.

The song reached number 81 on the UK Singles Chart, and number eight on the US Alternative Songs chart.

== Track listing ==
No.	Title	Length
1.	"7"	4:16
Total length:		4:16

== Charts ==
Chart (2016–2017)	Peak position
Canada Rock (Billboard)	46
Scotland Singles (Official Charts)	33
UK Singles (Official Charts)	81
US Hot Rock & Alternative Songs (Billboard)	35
US Rock & Alternative Airplay (Billboard)	17

== Certifications ==
Region	Certification	Certified units/sales
Australia (ARIA)	Gold	35,000^{‡}
United Kingdom (BPI)	Platinum	600,000^{‡}
^{‡} Sales+streaming figures based on certification alone.
