= The Balcony (album) =

Studio album by Catfish and the Bottlemen
- Released: 15 September 2014
- Genres: Alternative rock; indie rock
- Length: 37:38
- Labels: Island; Communion
- Producer: Jim Abbiss

Catfish and the Bottlemen chronology
Kathleen and the Other Three (2014)	The Balcony (2014)	The Ride (2016)

Singles from The Balcony
- 1. "Homesick" Released: 18 May 2013; 2. "Rango" Released: 13 August 2013; 3. "Kathleen" Released: 18 March 2014; 4. "Fallout" Released: 7 July 2014; 5. "Cocoon" Released: 23 September 2014; 6. "Pacifier" Released: 1 December 2014; 7. "Hourglass" Released: 19 August 2015

Professional ratings
Aggregate scores
Source	Rating
Metacritic	52/100
Review scores
Source	Rating
AllMusic	3.5/5 stars
Clash	6/10
The Guardian	2/5 stars
musicOMH	3.5/5 stars
NME	4/10
Q	2/5 stars
XS Noize	7/10

The Balcony is the debut studio album by Welsh indie rock band Catfish and the Bottlemen. It was released on 15 September 2014 in the United Kingdom by Island Records and 6 January 2015 in the United States by Communion Records. On 20 March 2015, The Balcony was awarded a Gold certification from the British Phonographic Industry. The album cover was designed by New York artist Tim Lahan who originally posted it to his Flickr account in 2009 and was subsequently contacted by the band.

The Balcony was nominated for the Welsh Music Prize 2014–15. As the band's second album The Ride was releasing, it was reported that The Balcony had sold 250,000 copies. In the United States, the album has sold 37,000 copies as of April 2016. In 2024, the band released a 10-year anniversary edition of the album, consisting of the album plus six bonus tracks.

== Reception ==
Critical reception of the album was mixed, with review aggregator Metacritic giving it 52/100 based on 6 reviews. Writing for AllMusic, Scott Kerr gave it three and a half stars out of five, saying that McCann's "weathered and assured vocals" gave an impression of a more experienced band and that Billy Bibby provided "grand Johnny Marr-inspired guitar hooks that are unapologetically catchy, gritty, and full of swagger". Ben Homewood of NME was more critical, giving the album 4/10 for being "ham-fisted and about nine years too late" despite "unstoppable desire and conviction". Tillie Elvrum of XS Noize rated the album 7/10, calling it "an incredibly polished debut album."

== Track listing ==
Lyrics by Van McCann and music by Catfish and the Bottlemen

All music is composed by Van McCann.

No.	Title	Length
1.	"Homesick"	2:30
2.	"Kathleen"	2:43
3.	"Cocoon"	3:59
4.	"Fallout"	3:32
5.	"Pacifier"	4:00
6.	"Hourglass"	2:20
7.	"Business"	3:43
8.	"26"	3:41
9.	"Rango"	3:00
10.	"Sidewinder"	3:29
11.	"Tyrants"	4:41
Total length:		37:38

== Trivia ==
A censored version of their song "Cocoon" was featured in the EA Sports game, FIFA 15, as a part of the game's soundtrack. Ewan McGregor features in the music video for the single "Hourglass".

== Personnel ==
Catfish and the Bottlemen

- Van McCann – lead vocals, rhythm guitar, piano
- Billy Bibby – lead guitar, backing vocals
- Benji Blakeway – bass guitar, backing vocals
- Bob Hall – drums, percussion

Additional musicians

- Jim Abbiss – programming; additional piano (track 6)
- Ben Lovett – additional piano (track 4)

Additional personnel

- Ian Dowling – engineering, mixing

== Charts ==
=== Weekly charts ===
Chart (2014–15)	Peak position
Australian Albums (ARIA)	51
UK Albums (Official Charts)	10
US Billboard 200	121
US Heatseekers Albums (Billboard)	4
US Independent Albums (Billboard)	8
US Top Alternative Albums (Billboard)	9
US Top Rock Albums (Billboard)	13

=== Year-end charts ===
Chart (2015)	Position
UK Albums (OCC)	36
Chart (2016)	Position
UK Albums (OCC)	63

== Certifications ==
Region	Certification	Certified units/sales
United Kingdom (BPI)	2× Platinum	600,000^{‡}
^{‡} Sales+streaming figures based on certification alone.
