= Cocoon (Catfish and the Bottlemen song) =

Single by Catfish and the Bottlemen

from the album The Balcony
- Released: 15 September 2014
- Genre: Garage rock; post-punk revival
- Length: 4:04
- Label: Island; Communion
- Songwriter: Van McCann
- Producer: Jim Abbiss

Catfish and the Bottlemen singles chronology
"Fallout" (2014)	"Cocoon" (2014)	"Pacifier" (2014)

Music video
- "Cocoon" on YouTube

"Cocoon" is the fifth single by Welsh indie rock band Catfish and the Bottlemen. The song was included on their debut studio album, The Balcony. The single was released on 15 September 2014. The single did not contain a B-side.

Cocoon was written about Van’s on and off girlfriend Nyree Waters.

The radio edit of the song was featured in the FIFA 15 and FIFA 23 video game soundtracks. This replaces 'but fuck it' with 'forget it'. The song was also available on Rock Band 4 as a downloadable track.

== Track listing ==
All music is composed by Van McCann.

No.	Title	Length
1.	"Cocoon"	4:04
Total length:		4:04

== Charts ==
Chart (2014–2015)	Peak position
Belgium (Ultratip Bubbling Under Wallonia)	78
UK Singles (Official Charts)	109
US Alternative Airplay (Billboard)	29
US Hot Rock & Alternative Songs (Billboard)	50

== Certifications ==
Region	Certification	Certified units/sales
United Kingdom (BPI)	2× Platinum	1,200,000^{‡}
^{‡} Sales+streaming figures based on certification alone.
