= Kathleen (song) =

Single by Catfish and the Bottlemen

from the album Kathleen and the Other Three and The Balcony
- Released: 7 April 2014
- Genre: Garage rock; post-punk revival
- Length: 2:44
- Label: Island; Communion
- Songwriter: Van McCann
- Producer: Jim Abbiss

Catfish and the Bottlemen singles chronology
| "Rango" (2013) | "Kathleen" (2014) | "Fallout" (2014) |

Music video
- "Kathleen" on YouTube

"Kathleen" is the third single by Welsh indie rock band Catfish and the Bottlemen. The song was included in their EP, Kathleen and the Other Three, and their debut studio album, The Balcony. The single was digitally released on 18 March 2014 as a music video, and on 7 April 2014, the 7-inch version of the single was released. The single did not contain a B-side.

Commercially, the song was the most successful single released on The Balcony. It was the band's first song to chart in Japan and the United States. The song was the band's second to chart in their native United Kingdom, reaching number 110 on the UK Singles Chart and number 11 on the UK Independent Singles Chart. In the US, the song reached number 17 on the Billboard Alternative Songs chart and number 40 on the Hot Rock Songs chart after receiving moderate radio airplay. In Japan, the song reached number 82 on the Japan Hot 100. The song additionally reached Platinum status by the British Phonographic Industry.

== Music video ==
The music video has the band performing the song in a studio with anaglyph effects with various hues of cyan and red to create a three-dimensional stereoscopic effect.

== Track listing ==
All music is composed by Van McCann.

| No. | Title | Length |
|---|---|---|
| 1. | "Kathleen" | 2:44 |
| Total length: | | 2:44 |

== Charts ==
| Chart (2014–15) | Peak position |
|---|---|
| Japan Hot 100 (Billboard) | 82 |
| UK Singles (Official Charts) | 110 |
| UK Indie (Official Charts) | 11 |
| US Alternative Airplay (Billboard) | 17 |
| US Hot Rock & Alternative Songs (Billboard) | 40 |

== Certifications ==
| Region | Certification | Certified units/sales |
|---|---|---|
| United Kingdom (BPI) | 2× Platinum | 1,200,000^{‡} |
^{‡} Sales+streaming figures based on certification alone.
