= This Ain't the Way You Go Out =

Studio album by Lucy Rose
- Released: 19 April 2024
- Length: 36:13
- Label: Communion
- Producer: Lucy Rose; Kwes

Lucy Rose chronology
No Words Left (2019)	This Ain't the Way You Go Out (2024)

Singles from This Ain't the Way You Go Out
- 1. "Could You Help Me" Released: 26 October 2023; 2. "The Racket" Released: 17 January 2024; 3. "Whatever You Want" Released: 20 February 2024; 4. "Over When It's Over" Released: 19 March 2024; 5. "Light as Grass" Released: 16 April 2024

This Ain't the Way You Go Out is the fifth studio album by English singer-songwriter Lucy Rose, released through Communion Records on 19 April 2024. It received positive reviews from critics.

== Composition and recording ==
The album was written following Rose's first pregnancy, after which she developed pregnancy-associated osteoporosis and broke eight vertebrae in her back. It was recorded over two days with Rose's backing band and the producer Kwes. In comparison to Rose's previous music, This Ain't the Way You Go Out has been noted as more "energetic and joyful".

== Critical reception ==
Professional ratings
Aggregate scores
Source	Rating
Metacritic	83/100
Review scores
Source	Rating
AllMusic	4/5 stars
DIY	4.5/5 stars
The Line of Best Fit	9/10
Mojo	4/5 stars
MusicOMH	4/5 stars
NME	4/5 stars
Pitchfork	7.2/10

This Ain't the Way You Go Out received a score of 83 out of 100 on review aggregator Metacritic based on seven critics' reviews, which the website categorised as "universal acclaim". Mojo described the album as "a suite of songs that are more reflective than self-pitying, and unlike her last, beats-free album, often grounded by solid grooves that allow her bewitching melodies to soar". Hannah Jocelyn of Pitchfork felt that it "expands her capabilities as a songwriter and musician while maintaining the warmth that's made her a British folk staple for over a decade". MusicOMH's John Murphy called the album "a blissfully light, uplifting listen, and as the title may suggest, a fearsomely defiant one as well".

NME's Thomas Smith found the album to be "less about bold statements but recognising the quiet, personal victories on that journey" and containing "some of the most interesting and sonically varied songs of her entire career". Michael Hoffman of The Line of Best Fit commented that This Ain't the Way You Go Out is "largely piano-driven, taking the jazz-inflected moments from [...] Something's Changing, and developing those sounds as the focal point, leading to a refreshingly confident and balanced record with hopefulness that belies the questioning and worry she faced with her diagnosis".

Sarah Jamieson of DIY wrote that "the raw moments in which she faces her recent experiences are heartbreaking", namely in the title track, "but there's also so much vibrancy and life to be felt here too". AllMusic's Marcy Donelson pointed out the "more immediate, jazzy spirit" of the album, on which nothing "is a misfire, as Rose deftly navigates these new approaches".

== Track listing ==
This Ain't the Way You Go Out track listing
No.	Title	Length
1.	"Light as Grass"	3:46
2.	"Could You Help Me"	2:46
3.	"Dusty Frames"	2:38
4.	"Whatever You Want"	3:40
5.	"Interlude I"	1:25
6.	"Life's Too Short"	3:39
7.	"This Ain't the Way You Go Out"	2:46
8.	"Over When It's Over"	3:35
9.	"Sail Away"	3:30
10.	"Interlude II"	1:09
11.	"No More"	4:01
12.	"The Racket"	3:18
Total length:		36:13

== Personnel ==
- Dan Parry – mixing engineer
- Daddy Kev – mastering engineer

== Charts ==
Chart performance for This Ain't the Way You Go Out
Chart (2024)	Peak position
Scottish Albums (OCC)	25
UK Albums (OCC)	62
UK Independent Albums (OCC)	3
