= Fallout (Catfish and the Bottlemen song) =

Single by Catfish and the Bottlemen

from the album The Balcony
- Released: 7 July 2014
- Genre: Garage rock; post-punk revival
- Length: 4:04
- Label: Island; Communion
- Songwriter: Van McCann
- Producer: Jim Abbiss

Catfish and the Bottlemen singles chronology
"Kathleen" (2014)	"Fallout" (2014)	"Cocoon" (2014)

Music video
- "Fallout" on YouTube

"Fallout" is the fourth single by Welsh indie rock band Catfish and the Bottlemen. The song was included in their debut studio album, The Balcony. The single was digitally released on 7 July 2014. The single did not contain a B-side.

The song was the first single by the band to chart in Belgium, reaching number 92 in the Ultratop chart.

== Track listing ==
All music is composed by Van McCann.

No.	Title	Length
1.	"Fallout"	4:04
Total length:		4:04

== Charts ==
Chart (2014)	Peak position
Belgium (Ultratip Bubbling Under Wallonia)	92

== Certifications ==
Region	Certification	Certified units/sales
United Kingdom (BPI)	Gold	400,000^{‡}
^{‡} Sales+streaming figures based on certification alone.
