= No Words Left =

Studio album by Lucy Rose
- Released: March 22, 2019
- Genre: Indie folk
- Length: 35:02
- Label: Communion
- Producer: Tim Bidwell

Lucy Rose chronology
Something's Changing (2017)	No Words Left (2019)	This Ain't the Way You Go Out (2024)

Singles from No Words Left
- 1. "Conversation" Released: January 10, 2019; 2. "Solo(w)" Released: February 8, 2019; 3. "Treat Me Like a Woman" Released: March 14, 2019

Professional ratings
Review scores
Source	Rating
AllMusic	4/5 stars
The Guardian	5/5 stars
The Independent	4/5 stars
NME	3/5 stars

No Words Left is the fourth solo studio album by English singer-songwriter Lucy Rose, released in 2019. It peaked at number 38 on the UK Albums Chart.

== Track listing ==
All tracks are written by Lucy Rose.

No.	Title	Length
1.	"Conversation"	3:50
2.	"No Words Left Pt. 1"	1:28
3.	"Solo(w)"	4:07
4.	"Treat Me Like a Woman"	3:48
5.	"The Confines of This World"	3:40
6.	"Just a Moment"	1:44
7.	"Nobody Comes Round Here"	3:47
8.	"What Does It Take"	2:34
9.	"Save Me from Your Kindness"	3:48
10.	"Pt. 2"	3:08
11.	"Song After Song"	3:08

== Personnel ==
- Lucy Rose: Vocals, Acoustic Guitar, Resonator Guitar, Electric Guitar, Piano, Electric Piano, Organ, Synth, Percussion
- Ben Daniel: Bass, Double Bass, Fretless Bass, Acoustic Guitar
- Andrew Stuart-Buttle: String Arrangement, Electric Guitar, Piano
- Matthew Kelly: String Arrangement, Violin, Viola, Cello
- Bjorn McAteer Dahlburg: Tenor Saxophone, Woodwind
- David Dyson: Congas, Timpani, Percussion
- Björn Ågren: Electric Guitar
- Charlotte Eksteen: Cello
- Marcus Hamblett: Synth

=== Production and design ===
- Producer: Tim Bidwell
- Mixing: Cenzo Townsend
- Assistant Mixing: Camden Clarke, Robert Sellens
- Mastering: Frank Arkwright
- Photography: Will Morris

== Charts ==
Chart (2019)	Peak position
UK Albums Chart	38
Scottish Albums Chart	26
