= Homesick (Catfish and the Bottlemen song) =

Single by Catfish and the Bottlemen

from the album Kathleen and the Other Three and The Balcony
- B-side: "Pacifier"
- Released: 18 May 2013 (digital); 17 June 2013 (7-inch)
- Genre: Indie rock; post-punk revival; blues rock
- Length: 4:54
- Label: Island; Communion
- Songwriter: Van McCann
- Producer: Jim Abbiss

Catfish and the Bottlemen singles chronology
"Homesick" (2013)	"Rango" (2013)

Music video
- "Homesick" on YouTube

"Homesick" is the first single by Welsh indie rock band Catfish and the Bottlemen. The song was included in their EP, Kathleen and the Other Three, and their debut studio album, The Balcony. The single was released on 18 May 2013 and reached 182 on the UK Singles Chart.

== Music video ==
The music video is a slideshow with split-second black-and-white photos of the band preparing for a concert and performing a concert. The music video was directed by Jon Stone, using photos by Jordan Curtis Hughes. The music video came out on 17 April 2015.

== Track listing ==
All music is composed by Van McCann.

No.	Title	Length
1.	"Homesick"	2:27
2.	"Pacifier"	2:27
Total length:		4:54

== Charts ==
Chart (2014)	Peak position
UK Singles (Official Charts)	182

== Certifications ==
Region	Certification	Certified units/sales
United Kingdom (BPI)	Platinum	600,000^{‡}
^{‡} Sales+streaming figures based on certification alone.
