= Like I Used To =

Like I Used To may refer to:

- Like I Used To (album), a 2012 album by Lucy Rose
- "Like I Used To" (Sharon Van Etten and Angel Olsen song), 2021
- "Like I Used To" (Tinashe song), 2018
