= Longshot (Catfish and the Bottlemen song) =

Single by Catfish and the Bottlemen

from the album The Balance
- Released: 7 January 2019
- Length: 3:53
- Label: Island
- Songwriter(s): Van McCann
- Producer(s): Jacknife Lee

Catfish and the Bottlemen singles chronology
"Outside" (2017)	"Longshot" (2019)	"Fluctuate" (2019)

Music video
- "Longshot" on YouTube

"Longshot" is a single by Welsh rock band Catfish and the Bottlemen. It is the lead song off of their third studio album, The Balance. The single was released on 7 January 2019 through Island Records.

== Charts ==
=== Weekly charts ===
Chart (2019)	Peak position
Canada Rock (Billboard)	11
Scotland (OCC)	26
UK Singles (OCC)	25
US Hot Rock & Alternative Songs (Billboard)	18
US Rock Airplay (Billboard)	7

=== Year-end charts ===
Chart (2019)	Position
US Hot Rock Songs (Billboard)	45
US Rock Airplay (Billboard)	21

== Certifications ==
Region	Certification	Certified units/sales
United Kingdom (BPI)	Platinum	600,000^{‡}
^{‡} Sales+streaming figures based on certification alone.
