= Nectar Woode =

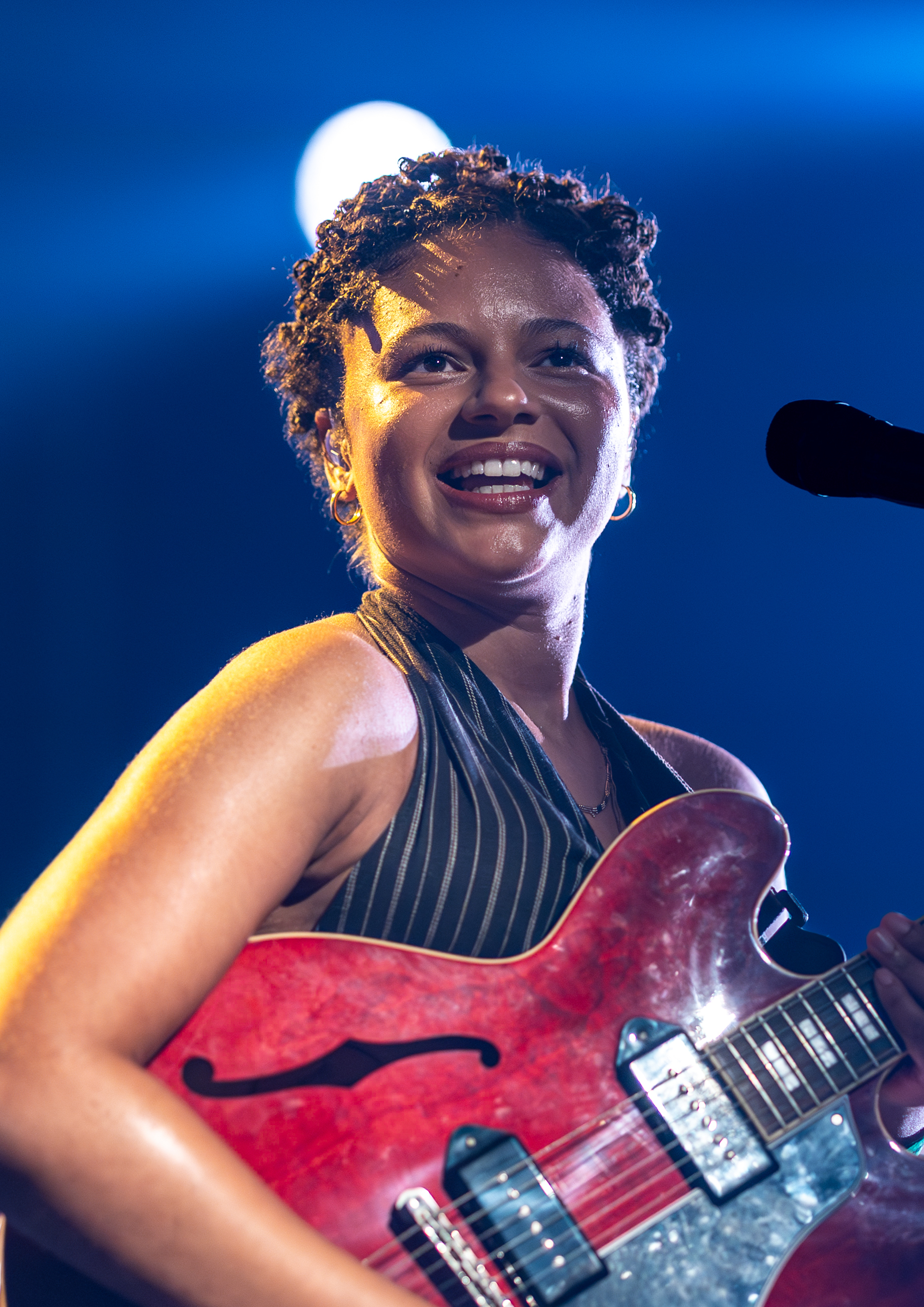
- Woode in 2026

Background information
- Born: Nectar Abena Nyantekyewaa Woode; 1999 (age 26–27); Milton Keynes, England
- Genres: Soul; jazz
- Instrument: Vocals
- Years active: 2021–present
- Label: Communion Records
- Website: www.nectarwoo.de

Nectar Abena Nyantekyewaa Woode (born 1999) is an English soul singer-songwriter and producer. Signed with Communion Records, she has released three EPs and the mixtape Naturally (2026).

== Early life ==
Woode was born in Milton Keynes to a Ghanaian father and an English mother. She graduated with a Bachelor of Arts (BA) in Creative Musicianship from the Institute of Contemporary Music Performance (ICMP).

== Career ==
Upon moving to London for university, Woode began playing open mics, improv nights, and in various bands. Mom Tudie discovered Woode on Instagram and invited her to collaborate the 2021 single "Fear Leads Us On" alongside Eriksson Kaner. This was followed by Woode's debut self-released solo single "For the Best" in 2022. She had gigs with Alice Phoebe Lou in 2022 and Eli Smart and Áine Deane in the first half of 2023.

In August 2023, Woode signed with Communion Records, through which she released the singles "Good Vibrations" and "God Talks Back". The former garnered over a million Spotify streams within a month. She featured at the Communion Xmas Party in December.

Woode featured on BBC Radio 1's Future Artists at the start of 2024. That year, Woode released her debut EP Nothing to Lose, preceded by the track "Nothing to Lose", as well as a second EP Nothing to Lose. Her music caught the attention of Elton John, who played it on his Apple Music show Rocket Hour. Woode had her first headline dates and gigs with Paris Paloma and Jacob Alon, and then Infinity Song and Nia Smith. She featured festivals including the Cambridge Folk Festival and Live at Leeds. In March 2025, Woode supported Nao on tour and performed at Glastonbury Festival on the BBC Music Introducing stage.

== Artistry ==
Growing, Woode listened to the likes of Lauryn Hill, Erykah Badu and D'Angelo. Regarding her second EP, Woode named Amy Winehouse and Duffy as more recent influences, mixing 21st-century British soul with earlier artists across the pond such as Minnie Riperton. She also draws upon West African music.

Woode has drawn comparisons to Cleo Sol, Corinne Bailey Rae and Olivia Dean.

== Discography ==
=== Mixtapes ===
- Naturally (2026)

=== EPs ===
- Nothing to Lose (2024)
- How It's Gotta Be (2024)
- it's like I never left (2025)

=== Singles ===
- "For the Best" (2022)
- "Moonshine (Live at 123 Studios)" (2023)
- "Save It All (Live at 123 Studios)" (2023)
- "Waiting" (2023)
- "Good Vibrations" (2023)
- "God Talks Back" (2023)
- "Nothing to Lose"
- "30 Degrees" (2024)
- "Head Above Water" (2024)
- "Waiting" / "For the Best" (2024)
- "Only Happen" (2025)
- "Ama Said" (2025)
- "Stick Fight" (2025)
- "Lights Off" (2026)
- "Naturally" (2026)
- "Rivers End" (2026)
- "Wine Into Water" (2026) featuring Elton John
- "Roses in the Dark" (2026)

=== Collaborations ===
- "Fear Leads Us On" (2021), with Mom Tudie and Eriksson Kaner
- "Ribbons" (2024), with Mom Tudie
