= Catfish the Bottleman =

Australian musician

- Born: Michael Anthony Bevan
- Origin: Sydney, New South Wales, Australia
- Genres: Alternative rock
- Occupations: Busker; musician
- Instruments: Drums; tuned bottles; voice
- Years active: 2000–present
- Website: catfishthebottleman.com

Catfish the Bottleman (born Michael Anthony Bevan) is an Australian busker, musician and singer-songwriter; he uses drums and tuned beer bottles. His nickname, Catfish, was earned in 2000 due to his styled spiky beard, which was reminiscent of the whiskers of a catfish.

== Biography ==
Catfish the Bottleman's real name is Michael Bevan. In 2015 Van McCann of British indie rockers, Catfish and the Bottlemen, cited Catfish the Bottleman as the inspiration behind the band's name. Catfish met the band that named themselves after him at the studios of Triple J radio in Sydney in January 2015.

According to Catfish the Bottleman's website, he first started busking while travelling in Ireland, the UK and the Canary Islands by playing a vacuum cleaner. He was a finalist on Australia's Got Talent in 2008. He made other TV appearances on Sunrise, The Footy Show and Rude Tube.
