= Soundcheck (song) =

Single by Catfish and the Bottlemen

from the album The Ride
- B-side: "Soundcheck" (studio version)
- Released: 16 February 2016
- Recorded: October–December 2015
- Genre: Garage rock; post-punk revival
- Length: 3:27
- Label: Capitol
- Songwriter(s): Van McCann
- Producer(s): Dave Sardy

Catfish and the Bottlemen singles chronology
"Hourglass" (2015)	"Soundcheck" (2016)	"7" (2016)

Music video
- "Soundcheck" on YouTube

"Soundcheck" is the eighth single by Welsh indie rock band Catfish and the Bottlemen. The song was the lead single from their sophomore album, The Ride. The single was digitally released on 16 February 2016.

== Track listing ==
The CD version of the single was for promotional use only and contained two versions of the song: the radio and studio edits.

All tracks are written by Van McCann

No.	Title	Length
1.	"Soundcheck" (radio edit)	3:27
2.	"Soundcheck" (studio edit)	3:58
Total length:		4:22

== Charts ==
Chart (2016)	Peak position
Canada Rock (Billboard)	23
Scotland (OCC)	28
UK Singles (OCC)	95
US Hot Rock & Alternative Songs (Billboard)	32
US Rock Airplay (Billboard)	15

== Certifications ==
Region	Certification	Certified units/sales
United Kingdom (BPI)	Gold	400,000^{‡}
^{‡} Sales+streaming figures based on certification alone.
