= The Balance =

Studio album by Catfish and the Bottlemen
- Released: 26 April 2019
- Studios: Grouse Lodge, Ireland
- Genre: Indie rock
- Length: 35:06
- Labels: Island; Capitol
- Producer: Jacknife Lee

Catfish and the Bottlemen chronology
The Ride (2016)	The Balance (2019)

Singles from The Balance
- 1. "Longshot" Released: 8 January 2019; 2. "Fluctuate" Released: 13 February 2019; 3. "2all" Released: 19 March 2019; 4. "Conversation" Released: 18 April 2019

The Balance is the third studio album by Welsh band Catfish and the Bottlemen. It was released on 26 April 2019 through Island Records in the United Kingdom and Capitol Records in the United States. It was preceded by the lead single "Longshot", which reached number 25 on the UK Singles Chart, also becoming the band's highest-charting song on the chart. The album was supported by a European tour, which began in April 2019. The Balance received mixed reviews from critics. The album is also the last album to feature Bob Hall and guitarist Johnny Bond who both left in 2021.

== Background ==
Following the release of 'The Ride' on 27 May 2016, the band played a world tour which included their first ever headlining UK arena tour including The SSE Arena, Wembley. During this tour, Van McCann teased a third album and said that they would begin to record it by the end of 2017. In 2018 the band headlined "This is Tomorrow" festival and played a sold out show at Cardiff Castle with support from Twin Atlantic.

On 25 June 2018 the band announced their second headlining show at The SSE Arena, Wembley which would be postponed to fit in with a sold out UK and Ireland tour in February 2019. On 8 January 2019 the band premiered the first single from 'The Balance' entitled 'Longshot' through Future Sounds With Annie Mac on BBC Radio 1. McCann revealed that "Longshot" was the first song they recorded for the album, but that it was not supposed to be the lead single: "I actually had another one which I thought was stronger, but I turned up to the guys and played them Longshot and they were like: 'What?'" He said that producers "enjoyed it so much they decided to keep it as the first taste of the new record".

The album was officially announced on 25 January 2019 alongside a European tour" The second single 'Fluctuate' was released on 13 February 2019 and was described by McCann in an interview with Zane Lowe on his Beats 1 show that the track was one of the "heaviest" tracks the band had done to date.

Van McCann stated about recording with Jacknife Lee at Grouse Lodge studios in Ireland that "It's good when you're completely engulfed in recording in a place like that, living together, because every day and all day it was about the songs. We had fun too; they were the funniest album sessions we've done."

== Reception ==
Professional ratings
Aggregate scores
Source	Rating
Metacritic	53/100
Review scores
Source	Rating
AllMusic	3/5 stars
Dork	2/5 stars
The Independent	2/5 stars
NARC Magazine	3.5/5 stars
NME	3/5 stars
The Times	3/5 stars

Similar to the band's previous two albums, "The Balance" received mixed reviews with review aggregator Metacritic giving it 53/100 based on 5 reviews. Many criticised the band for not developing their sound from their previous two records, such as Roisin O'Connor from The Independent, who described the band as "meat and potatoes" rock and criticised the band for staying inside the box. Jordan Bassett with NME said that although the band don't do anything different "sometimes the formula just works." Alex Cabré with Dork described Longshot as "a brash and ballsy kick off" however said that following that track McCann "systematically ticks off every cliché in the indie frontman handbook over some of the blandest instrumentals since the last Catfish and the Bottlemen album."

== Track listing ==
All tracks written by Van McCann

No.	Title	Length
1.	"Longshot"	3:52
2.	"Fluctuate"	3:12
3.	"2all"	3:08
4.	"Conversation"	3:31
5.	"Sidetrack"	3:20
6.	"Encore"	2:45
7.	"Basically"	3:21
8.	"Intermission"	1:47
9.	"Mission"	3:43
10.	"Coincide"	3:05
11.	"Overlap"	3:22
Total length:		35:06

== Charts ==
=== Weekly charts ===
Chart (2019)	Peak position
Australian Albums (ARIA)	9
Irish Albums (IRMA)	13
Scottish Albums (Official Charts)	2
Swiss Albums (Schweizer Hitparade)	73
UK Albums (Official Charts)	2
US Billboard 200	159
US Top Alternative Albums (Billboard)	16
US Top Rock Albums (Billboard)	31

=== Year-end charts ===
Chart (2019)	Position
UK Albums (OCC)	77

== Certifications ==
Region	Certification	Certified units/sales
United Kingdom (BPI)	Gold	100,000^{‡}
^{‡} Sales+streaming figures based on certification alone.
