= The Shallow Call =

British band

- Origin: Northwich, Cheshire, United Kingdom
- Genres: Alternative rock; indie rock; post-punk revival; garage rock
- Years active: 2004–2010
- Labels: SiZe Records; Cherry Bomb Disco
- Past members: Phil O'Driscoll; Richard Rogerson; David Pickering; Nik Ward-Dutton; Mark Robinson

The Shallow Call were an indie rock band from Northwich, England, established in 2004. They played with such notable bands as Catfish and the Bottlemen, The Charlatans, The Pigeon Detectives and The Enemy.

== Discography ==
- "Frank Bruno" (2007)
- "Where We All Hang Around" (2008)
- "I Wanted You More Than You Wanted Me" (2009)
