= The Magic Loungeabout =

Music festival in North Yorkshire, England

The Magic Loungeabout was a music festival held in the grounds of Broughton Hall, North Yorkshire.

Originally held in the grounds of Newburgh Priory in Coxwold in 2008, it moved to Broughton Hall in 2011.

The festival was only held three times, in 2008, 2011, and in 2012.

== Format of Festival ==
The festival took place over a full weekend, with the Saturday focused on electropop, whilst the Sunday was more acoustic lead.

The event that was planned for 2010, also saw the intention of 15 new areas on the site including concierge service, pop up restaurants, a cinema, speakers tent, grown up games area, themed camping areas, video projections, walk about art, and VIP day tent packages with waiter service, however, the festival was cancelled and returned for its final edition in 2011. The festival advertised itself as a "refined unwind".

== Lineups ==
=== 2008 ===
30–31 August 2008, held at Newburgh Priory, Coxwold

- Eliza Doolittle (singer)
- Pacific
- The Egg
- Nouvelle Vague
- Morcheeba
- Ladytron
- Gary Numan
- John Kelly

=== 2009 ===
No festival was held because of the economic downturn.

=== 2010 ===
No festival was held because of the economic downturn; whilst 2009 was intended not to run, the 2010 event was supposed to take place but was cancelled.

=== 2011 ===
29–31 July 2011, held at Broughton Hall, Skipton.

- The Human League
- Badly Drawn Boy
- New Young Pony Club
- Fenech Soler
- Florrie
- Graeme Park
- Clint Boon
- Ed Sheeran

=== 2012 ===
27–29 July 2012, held at Broughton Hall, Skipton.

- The Charlatans
- Juan Zelada
- Chic
- Lucy Rose
- Summer Camp
- Benjamin Francis Leftwich
- Stuart Maconie
- Kevin Saunders
- Smoove and Turrell
