= Lucy Rose =

English musician

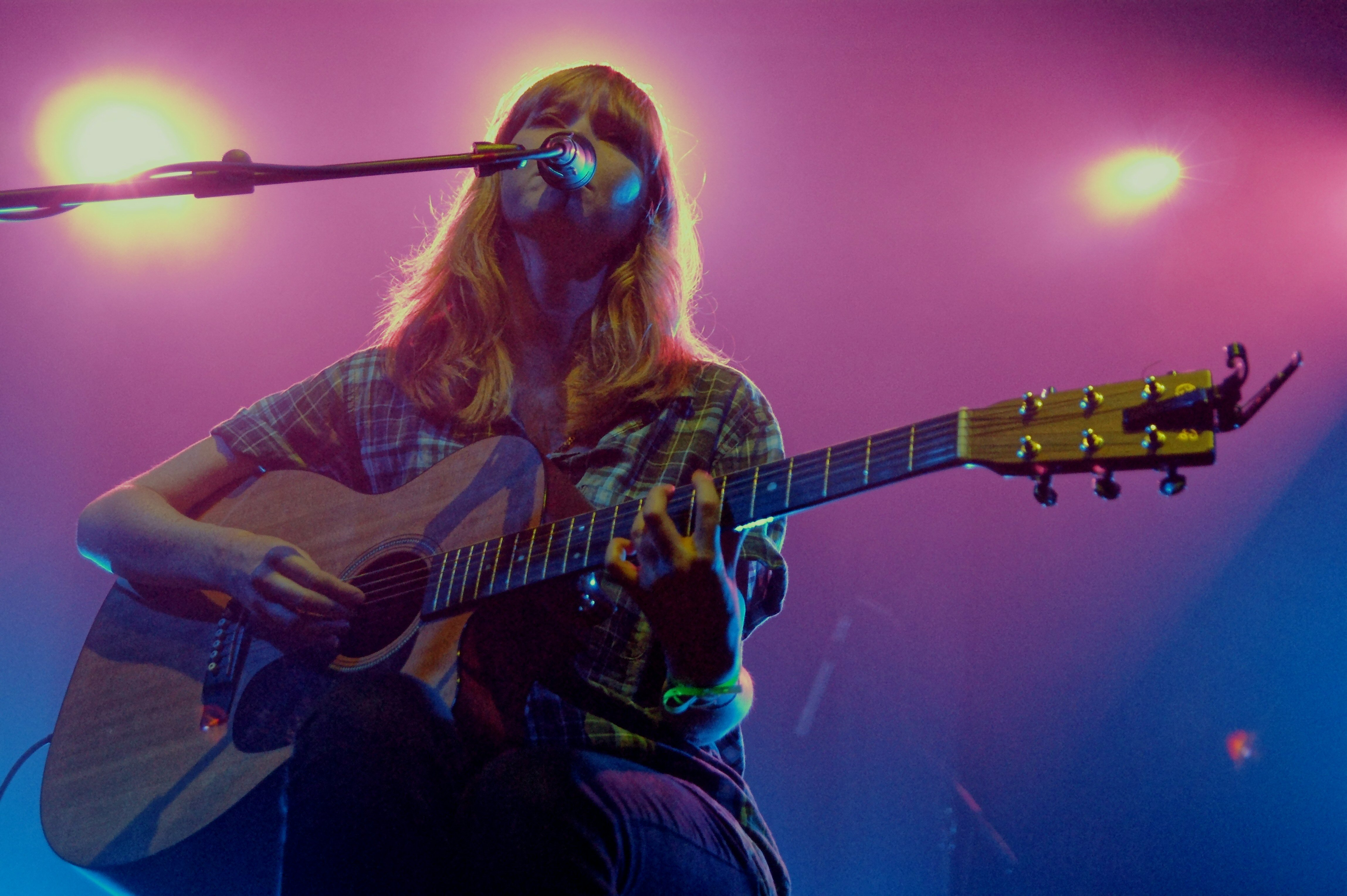
- Lucy Rose in 2015

Background information
- Born: Lucy Rose Parton; 20 June 1989 (age 37); Camberley, Surrey, England
- Genres: Folk rock, indie folk
- Occupation: Singer-songwriter
- Instruments: Vocals; guitar; piano; keyboards; percussion
- Years active: 2009–present
- Labels: Columbia, Communion
- Formerly of: Bombay Bicycle Club
- Website: lucyrosemusic.com

Lucy Rose Parton (born 20 June 1989) is an English singer-songwriter. She signed with Columbia Records to release her debut studio album, Like I Used To (2012), which was met with critical praise and entered the UK Albums Chart, along with each of her subsequent releases. Her fifth and latest studio album, This Ain't The Way You Go Out, was released in April 2024. She founded her own record label, Real Kind Records, an imprint of Communion Music in January 2020.

== Life and career ==
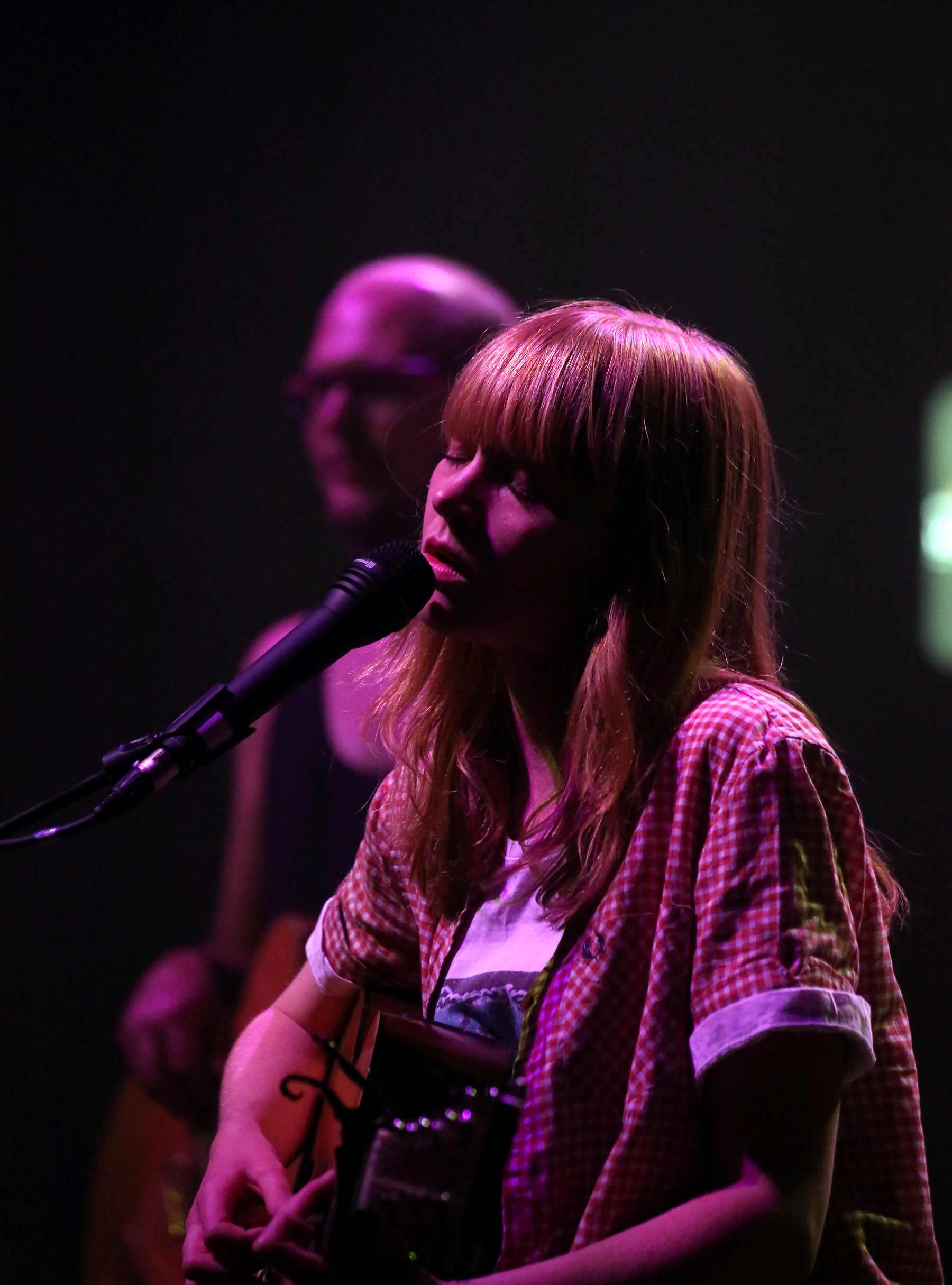
Rose (Waves Vienna 2012)

Born in Camberley, Surrey, England, Rose's musical origins began with her playing drums in her school orchestra; her songwriting started with her writing tunes on her family home's piano. She is the youngest of three sisters. She later bought a guitar from a shop she passed on the way to school, taught herself and began writing material at around the age of sixteen. Rose never played her material for anyone until she left home after completing her A-levels.

At eighteen, she moved to London; instead of taking her place at University College London to study geography, she began experimenting and performing with other musicians. It was at this time when she met Jack Steadman, the frontman of Bombay Bicycle Club. After becoming friends, Steadman asked if she would like to perform vocals on a song he had written and was recording. The acoustic album Flaws came out with Steadman on lead vocals, and Rose performing backing vocals, most notably on the title track "Flaws", as well as others on the album. She went on to perform some backing vocal duties on Bombay Bicycle Club's third album, A Different Kind of Fix, and features in their fourth, So Long, See You Tomorrow. Rose also performs some backing vocal duties on the track This Sullen Welsh Heart by the Manic Street Preachers on their album Rewind the Film. In 2018 she provided backing vocals for Paul Weller's fourteenth studio album True Meanings, and appeared on stage with him in 2019 for his Royal Festival Hall concert, Other Aspects.

A fan of tea, Rose began selling her own blend named "Builder Grey" (two part English Breakfast and one part Earl Grey) at her shows as a substitute for merchandise or CDs.

=== Debut album: Like I Used To (2012–2015) ===
In 2012, Rose started recording her debut album Like I Used To, with producer Charlie Hugall at her parents' house in Warwickshire. On 12 May 2012, she was signed to the record label Columbia Records. The album was released on 24 September. Vogue magazine stated that she was "one of indie music's breakout stars for 2012". Her song, "Don't You Worry" appeared on the TV show Skins on the second episode of the sixth season. "Be Alright" was featured in the finale episode of series five of The Vampire Diaries.

Rose then began touring the UK, the United States and Canada with Bombay Bicycle Club and Noah and the Whale in February and March 2012. She played at the Live at Leeds festival in May 2012. She played a set at the Bread & Rose's stage at Kent's Hop Farm Festival on 30 June, the same day as Bob Dylan. She played at The Magic Loungeabout (Broughton Hall, North Yorkshire) in July 2012. She also played at Latitude Festival in July 2012, Y Not Festival and Green Man Festival in August 2012, plus Bestival in September 2012. She played Reading/Leeds Festival 2012, and performed an acoustic version of "Bikes", a single from the album, on BBC Three, during their coverage of the festival. Rose headlined the main stage on Friday of Fieldview Festival near Chippenham, Wiltshire.

"Night Bus" appeared on the MTV reality TV show Catfish: The TV Show on the tenth episode of the first season. Later in 2013, Sony Mobile chose Rose to perform the soundtrack of the official TV advertisement of Sony's Flagship mobile phone Sony Xperia Z1; the song "Movin' On Up" was composed and arranged by Gillespie/Young/Innes, courtesy of Columbia Records/Sony Music. In December 2013, Rose confirmed via Twitter that she had begun recording her second studio album, Work It Out, that was released on 13 July 2015. In 2014, "Shiver" was used as the opening theme for the second season of the anime series Mushishi.

In February 2015, "Shiver" was used as the closing song of Girls season 4 episode 5 starring Lena Dunham.

=== Second studio album: Work It Out (2015–2016) ===
In May 2015, Rose announced that her second studio record, Work It Out, showed her "development as a person". Her album was recorded in London's Snap Studios and produced by Rich Cooper, notable for his work alongside Mumford & Sons and Tom Odell.

In December 2015 Rose recorded three tracks for BBC Radio 1 at Maida Vale with Rae Morris. A version of one of these covers, Shakin' Stevens' "Merry Christmas Everyone", was used a year later on the BBC's promotional video for their seasonal programming.

=== Third studio album: Something's Changing (2016–2018) ===
In the spring of 2016, Rose was inspired by the number of tweets and Spotify streams coming from Latin America and decided to give something back to her fans in those territories. Rose offered a deal to her fans: "If you book me a gig, I'll come and stay."

For two months in 2016, Rose took her guitar and backpacked around Ecuador, Peru, Chile, Argentina, Paraguay, Uruguay, Brazil, and Mexico, playing free shows and staying with fans. While on this tour, she made a documentary, 'Something's Changing', of her experiences. The documentary was later screened at her concerts in beginning in 2017 and is available to stream on her official YouTube channel.

Due to the lukewarm critical reception of her sophomore album and the prospect of the lack of creative control for her forthcoming third album, she left Columbia Records in 2016 and later signed with the independent label, Communion Records, to release her third album.

Upon returning to the UK from her travels in Latin America, Rose began work on her third album, Something's Changing. The album was recorded in 17 days with producer Tim Bidwell, bassist Ben Daniel and drummer Chris Boot in Brighton. The album features appearances from Daughter's Elena Tonra and Matthew and The Atlas' Emma Gatrill. On two tracks vocal harmonies are provided by The Staves ("Floral Dresses" and "Is This Called Home").

In December 2016, Lucy went out on an intimate lamplit tour of UK Libraries as part of the Get It Loud In Libraries initiative www.getitloudinlibraries.com

Following the release of Something's Changing, Rose released two singles as bonus tracks: "End Up Here" in October 2017 and "All That Fear" in January 2018, both with accompanying music videos.

In May 2018, Rose announced she was going to release a Something's Changing remix album, which would feature new versions of every track on Something's Changing except "Floral Dresses", "Find Myself" and "I Can't Change It All", plus an "All That Fear" remix. Among the producers who remixed her tracks are musicians/producers Fryars, Get Cape. Wear Cape. Fly and Liz Lawrence. The digital-only album was released 6 July 2018.

Rose featured on the track "Thank You" from Logic's fourth studio album, YSIV, released on 28 September 2018. She previously featured on his track "Innermission" from Logic's second album, The Incredible True Story, and on "Anziety" from his third album, Everybody.

=== Fourth studio album: No Words Left (2019–2022) ===
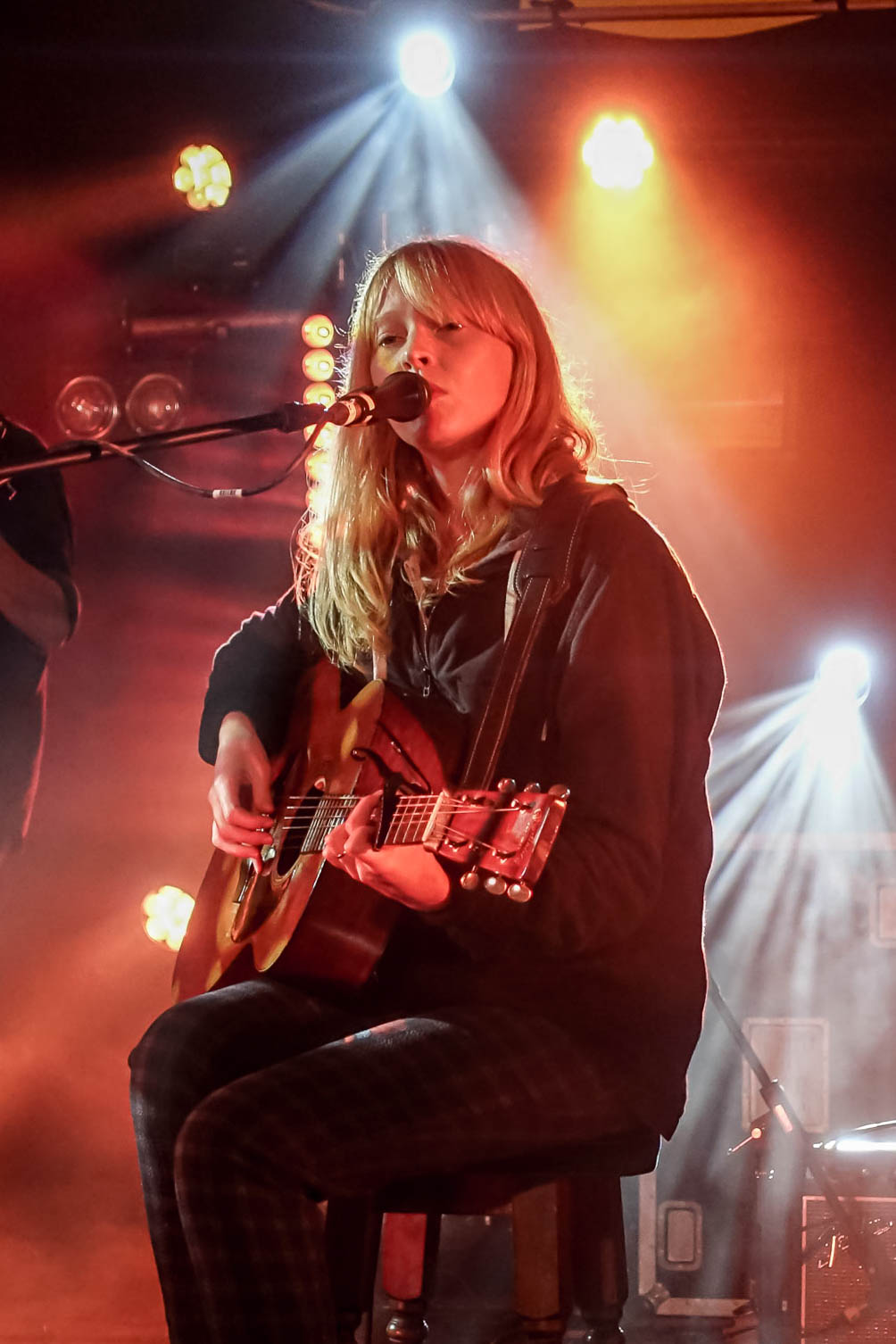
Lucy Rose performing at Y Not Festival, Pikehall, Derbyshire, in 2019

On 11 January 2019, Rose announced her fourth album would be titled No Words Left, with a release date of 22 March 2019 and an accompanying European tour. The album deals with Rose's mental health. She also released the first single, "Conversation", and accompanying video. She released the second single, "Solo(w)", in February, and the third, "Treat Me Like A Woman", in March 2019.

In May 2020, Rose released two standalone singles, "Question It All" and "White Car".

In August 2022, Rose announced a special gold vinyl reissue of Like I Used To for its tenth anniversary in September.

=== Fifth studio album: This Ain't The Way You Go Out (2023–present) ===
In January 2023, Rose featured on "Wake Up", the lead single from Logic's eight album, College Park. Rose performed backing vocals on 7 other tracks on the album.

On 26 October 2023, Rose released her first single since 2020, "Could You Help Me", as the lead single from her fifth studio album. Rose announced the record's second single would be titled "The Racket" through her social media on 14 January 2024. The song released three days later on 17 January with a first play on Lauren Laverne's BBC Radio 6 Music show, and with it Rose announced her new album This Ain't The Way You Go Out would be released on 19 April through Communion Records. Rose also shared that the time spend recording with Logic was instrumental in rebuilding her confidence, and the record had been produced by London producer Kwes and written in Paul Weller's home studio. Rose released the album's third single, "Whatever You Want", on 20 February 2024, and the fourth single, "Over When It's Over", on 20 March 2024. The album opener, "Light As Grass", was released on 16 April as the fifth single, a few days before the album release date. Lucy did not tour the album due to her second pregnancy, and instead played a one-off show at the Roundhouse in Camden as part of their In The Round festival. She also played several smaller instore shows around South East England and released some live studio recordings of "Over When It's Over", "Light As Grass", "Could You Help Me" and "Sail Away" which were filmed in Weller's Black Barn Studios, where the album was originally written. She next released a live video of "Dusty Frames" filmed in One Church Brighton, and a music video for "Sail Away" starring Danny Dyer.

In July 2024, Rose released a Picard Brothers remix of "Could You Help Me" as the first in a series of remixes of tracks from her fifth album. The full album, featuring 6 remixes from the album, was released on 27 September 2024.

In February 2024, Rose also reunited with old collaborators Bombay Bicycle Club on "Willow", from their EP Fantasies.

== Influences ==
Rose's musical exploration and exposure to new music began with her move to London. In interviews, she has shown an affection for Neil Young, Joni Mitchell, and Adele.

== Personal life ==
Rose is married to tour manager William Morris with whom she has two children. Her sister-in-law is British singer-songwriter Rae Morris. In early 2019, she and her husband relocated from London to Brighton. Following the birth of her first child in 2021, Rose was subsequently diagnosed with a rare form of pregnancy-related osteoporosis after medical tests revealed she had eight broken vertebrae following the birth.

== Discography ==
=== Albums ===
Album title	Album details	Peak chart positions		
Album title	Album details	UK	IRE	SCT
Like I Used To	Released: 24 September 2012; Label: Columbia, Sony Music; Formats: Digital download, CD, vinyl	13	90	31
Work It Out	Released: 6 July 2015; Label: Columbia, Sony Music; Formats: Digital download, CD, vinyl	9	—	25
Something's Changing	Released: 7 July 2017; Label: Communion; Formats: Digital download, CD, vinyl	34	—	55
No Words Left	Released: 22 March 2019; Label: Communion; Formats: Digital download, CD, vinyl	38	—	26
This Ain't the Way You Go Out	Released: 19 April 2024; Label: Communion; Formats: Digital download, CD, vinyl	64	—	25

=== Remix albums ===
Album title	Album details	Peak chart positions	
Album title	Album details	UK	IRE
Something's Changing (Remixes)	Released: 6 July 2018; Label: Communion; Formats: Digital download	—	—
This Ain't the Way You Go Out (Remixes)	Released: 27 September 2024; Label: Communion; Formats: Digital download	—	—

=== Live albums ===
Album title	Album details	Peak chart positions	
Album title	Album details	UK	IRE
Live at Urchin Studios	Released: 9 December 2016; Label: Rose Records; Formats: Digital download, CD, vinyl	—	—
The Complete Concert at Union Chapel	Released: 21 August 2026; Label: Platoon; Formats: Digital download, vinyl	-	-

=== Singles ===
Year	Single	Album
2011	"Middle of the Bed"	Like I Used To
2011	"Scar"	Like I Used To
2012	"Red Face"	Like I Used To
2012	"Lines"	Like I Used To
2012	"Bikes"	Like I Used To
2013	"Shiver"	Like I Used To
2015	"Our Eyes"	Work It Out
2015	"Like an Arrow"	Work It Out
2015	"Till the End"	Work It Out
2015	"Nebraska"	Work It Out
2017	"Floral Dresses"(featuring The Staves)	Something's Changing
2017	"Is This Called Home"	Something's Changing
2017	"No Good at All"	Something's Changing
2017	"Second Chance"	Something's Changing
2017	"End Up Here"	Non-album singles
2018	"All That Fear"	Non-album singles
2018	"Intro (Chartreuse Remix)"	Something's Changing (Remixes)
2018	"Soak It Up (JAWS Remix)"	Something's Changing (Remixes)
2018	"Morai (Liz Lawrence Remix)"	Something's Changing (Remixes)
2018	"Second Chance (Fryars Remix)"	Something's Changing (Remixes)
2018	"Is This Called Home (Anatole Remix)"	Something's Changing (Remixes)
2018	"All That Fear (Otzeki Remix)"	Something's Changing (Remixes)
2019	"Conversation"	No Words Left
2019	"Solo(w)"	No Words Left
2019	"Treat Me Like a Woman"	No Words Left
2020	"Question It All" / "White Car"	Non-album singles
2023	"Could You Help Me"	This Ain't the Way You Go Out
2024	"The Racket"	This Ain't the Way You Go Out
2024	"Whatever You Want"	This Ain't the Way You Go Out
2024	"Over When It's Over"	This Ain't the Way You Go Out
2024	"Light as Grass"	This Ain't the Way You Go Out
2024	"Could You Help Me (Picard Brothers Remix)"	Non-album singles
2024	"Those Red Lights"	Non-album singles
2025	"Pale Blue Eyes"	Non-album singles
2025	"Pink"	Non-album singles
2026	"Scared of Loving Wild Again"	Non-album singles
