= Bide Your Time (EP) =

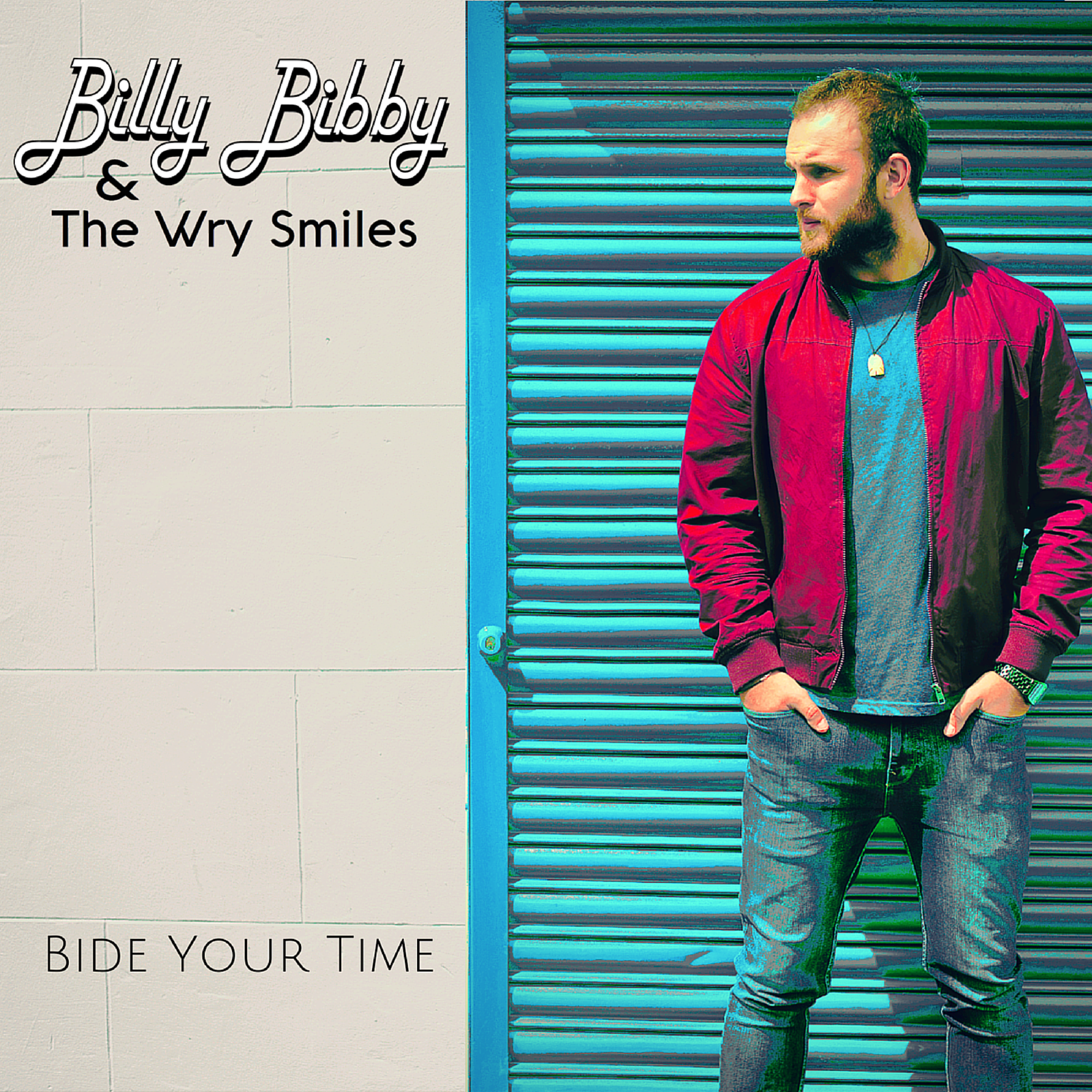

EP by Billy Bibby & The Wry Smiles
- Released: 5 February 2016
- Genre: Rock; indie rock; pop
- Length: 14:13
- Label: Independent
- Producer: Russ Hayes

Singles from Bide Your Time
- 1. "Waitin' for You" Released: 3 November 2015

Bide Your Time is the debut extended play (EP) by British rock band Billy Bibby & The Wry Smiles, produced by Russ Hayes at Orange Sound Recording Studio in Penmaenmawr, North Wales. It was released on 5 February 2016 digitally and on CDs available for purchase at shows. The EP's title refers to a song that Billy Bibby has said will be released at a later date. Bibby has also stated that Bide Your Time describes the music business in that one must be patient and hardworking to succeed.

== Background ==
Prior to the release of Bide Your Time, the track "Waitin' for You" premiered on Adam Walton's show on BBC Radio Wales, initially in a home studio version on 25 July 2015 and in the final EP version on 7 November 2015. The world premiere of "Don't Fall" also aired on Adam Walton's show on 30 January 2016 in anticipation of the 5 February 2016 release date. Tracks have also been played by Clint Boon and Phil Clifton on Radio X, Nessi Holt on Radio Kaos Caribou, and John Rose on UIC Radio in Chicago.

In describing what he wanted to achieve musically with this debut EP, following a departure in 2014 from his first band, Catfish and the Bottlemen, Billy Bibby has stated, “I want to bring back something like Fleetwood Mac’s Rumours or Dire Straits’ Brothers in Arms where there's a bit more going on; there's a bit more depth to the songs, in the vocals, in the harmonies. It's pop-infused, but not just simple pop. It's not country, but it's got a bit of a twang to it. It's indie and it's rock. It's got a little bit of everything. I think the time is right for it.”

On his 29 December 2015 broadcast, Manchester Radio X DJ Clint Boon described Billy Bibby's music as “That classic sort of British songwriting with a strong nod to Americiana.”

== Track listing ==
1. "Don't Fall" – 4:10
2. "This Kind of Summer" – 3:49
3. "Waitin' for You" – 3:31
4. "Believe Me" – 2:41

== Personnel ==
- Billy Bibby – lead vocals, guitar
- Rob Jones – lead guitar, vocals
- Matt Thomas – bass, vocals
- Mike Pearce – drums
- Russ Hayes – producer at Orange Sound Recording Studio
