= Catfish and the Bottlemen =

British indie rock band

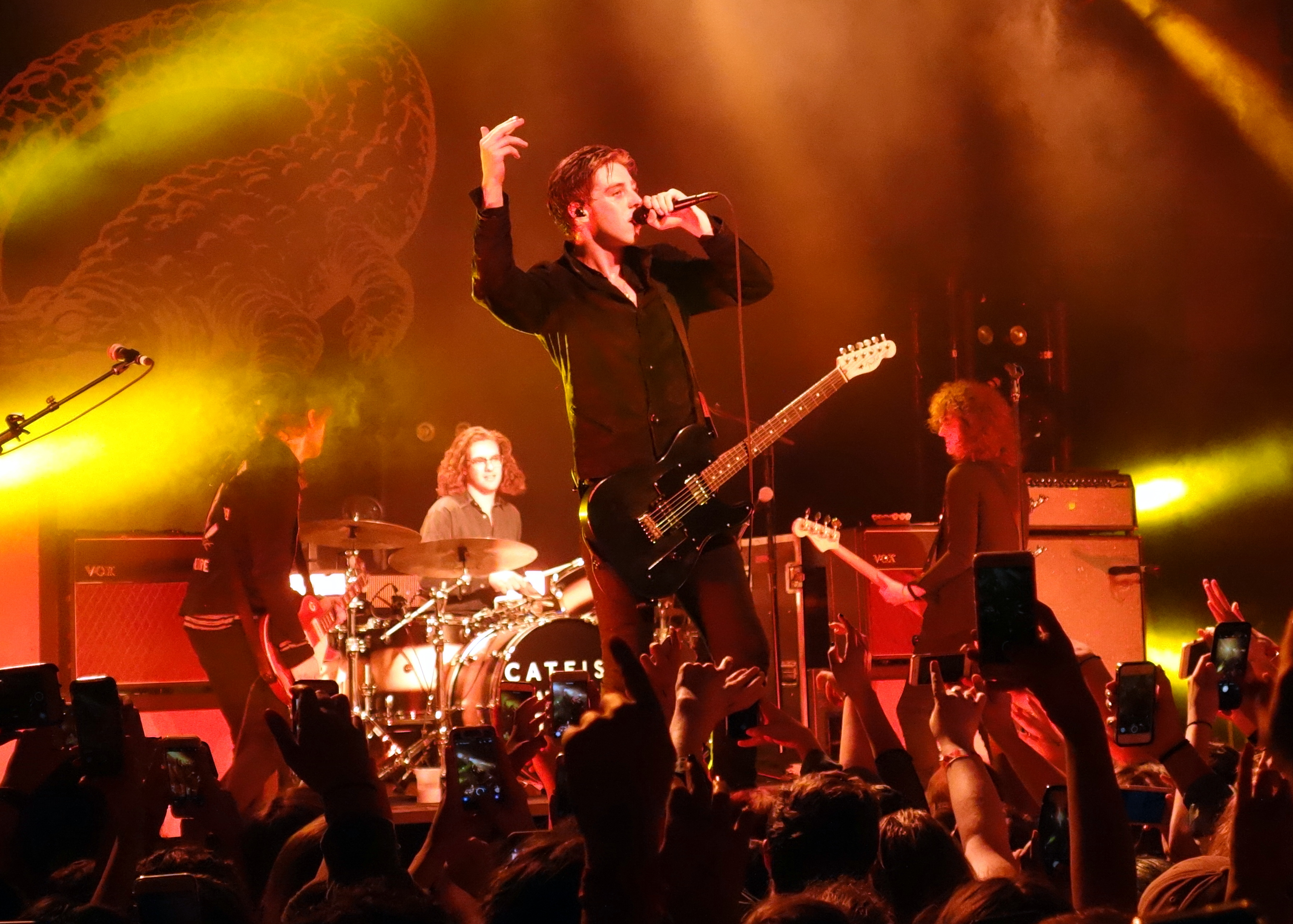
- Catfish and the Bottlemen performing in 2017.

Background information
- Origin: Llandudno, Conwy, Wales
- Genres: Alternative rock; indie rock; post-punk revival
- Years active: 2007–2021 • 2024–present
- Labels: Island; Communion
- Members: Van McCann; Benji Blakeway
- Past members: Jon Barr; Billy Bibby; Bob Hall; Johnny Bond
- Website: catfishandthebottlemen.co.uk

Catfish and the Bottlemen are a British indie rock band formed in Llandudno, Conwy, Wales, in 2007. The band currently consists of Van McCann (lead vocals, guitars) and Benji Blakeway (bass guitar, backing vocals). Their debut album, The Balcony, was released in 2014, peaking at number ten on the UK Albums Chart and later achieving Platinum certification on 30 December 2016. Renowned for their energetic live performances, the band have toured across North America, South America, Europe, Japan and Australia, performing at festivals including Glastonbury, Reading and Leeds, Latitude, TRNSMT, T in the Park, All Points East, Governors Ball, Bonnaroo, Lollapalooza, Falls Festival and Splendour in the Grass.

On 24 February 2016, Catfish and the Bottlemen were awarded the Brit Award for British Breakthrough Act, marking a significant milestone in their rise. Their second album, The Ride, released on 27 May 2016, debuted at number one on the UK Albums Chart and has sold 300,000 units in the UK. The band released their third album, The Balance, on 26 April 2019, which secured the number two spot on the UK Albums Chart.

== History ==
=== 2007–2013: Formation and early years ===
Catfish and the Bottlemen, originally known as "The Prestige", were formed in May 2007, when Ryan Evan "Van" McCann and Billy Bibby began playing guitar together at Bibby's parents' bed and breakfast in Llandudno, Wales. McCann's parents also ran a bed and breakfast in Llandudno, and he first met Bibby through Bibby's younger brother, Stephen. The duo were soon joined by Benji Blakeway on bass, making him the third founding member of the band. Shortly afterwards, their schoolmate Jon Barr completed the line-up on drums. Bibby, who had been playing guitar since the age of 10, taught both McCann and Blakeway how to play.

In an interview with Sound of Boston, McCann noted his dislike for playing covers because of the way his music career began: "When I was a 15 year old and we first started a band, our job Monday to Friday was to play at clubs, playing Beatles covers and Oasis covers. We spent seven years writing our own songs, making our own albums, and people are like 'play Kanye West!' We're like 'no man, are you crazy?'"

The band initially promoted themselves by performing as support acts for friends' bands, including Northwich-based group The Shallow Call, and by playing impromptu gigs in car parks following shows by bigger bands, such as Kasabian. Steve Lamacq first played one of their early demos on BBC Radio 6 Music in March 2009. Later that year, Catfish and the Bottlemen competed in the 'North Wales Battle of the Bands', organised by Gareth Thomas, where they finished as runners-up to local band The Fides, who went on to perform at the Conwy River Festival.

In 2010, original drummer Jon Barr was replaced by Bob Hall, who was introduced to the band by Russ Hayes, a North Wales-based producer working with the band at the time.

McCann first met future band member Johnny Bond at the Ravenstonedale Festival in 2011, where both bands were performing. At the time, Bond was a member of Symphonic Pictures, but he would later join Catfish and the Bottlemen in 2014.

The band's name originates from McCann's earliest musical memory: an Australian street busker he encountered in Sydney, known as Catfish the Bottleman. The busker earned the nickname "Catfish" due to his distinctive, spiky beard when he began performing in 2000, and he played beer bottles strung to a wire. In January 2015, McCann was reunited with Catfish the Bottleman at the Triple J studios in Sydney.

=== 2013–2016: The Balcony ===
In 2013, the band signed with Communion Music and released their first three singles, "Homesick", "Rango", and "Pacifier" the same year.

In 2014, the band signed with Island Records and released the single "Kathleen" on 17 March, produced by Jim Abbiss (known for his work with Arctic Monkeys, Kasabian and Adele). All of their singles received premieres from Zane Lowe and were added to the BBC Radio 1 playlist. In April, "Kathleen" was ranked number one on MTV's hottest tracks.

During the summer of 2014, Catfish and the Bottlemen performed at numerous festivals across the UK and Europe, including Reading and Leeds, Latitude, Kendal Calling, Y Not Festival, Strawberry Fields Festival, T in the Park, Pinkpop, Bingley Music Live and Ibiza Rocks. They also performed at New York's Governors Ball. On 19 June, the band announced their debut studio album, The Balcony, would be released in September.

Later that summer, founding lead guitarist Billy Bibby unexpectedly ceased performing with the band and was replaced by Johnny "Bondy" Bond. On 25 July, the band cancelled three festival appearances, citing "unforeseen personal circumstances". Then, on 13 August, they announced on Facebook: "Some of you will have noticed that we have been playing with a different guitarist over the past weekend. Unfortunately, due to some personal circumstances, Billy won't be touring with the band for the foreseeable future."

When asked about his departure, Bibby later reflected: "Well, to be honest, after Catfish I had no plans. I didn't know what I was going to do. I just started writing songs and it took off from there..." He added, "I'm proud of what I did in Catfish and what I achieved and everything that came with it, but I'm just looking into the future now with my band and that's all I'm focused on." In 2015, he went on to form his own band, Billy Bibby & The Wry Smiles.

The Balcony was released on 15 September 2014, followed by the announcement of a UK tour. The album debuted at number 10 on the UK Albums Chart for the week ending 27 September and was certified Silver on 9 January 2015, Gold on 20 March and ultimately Platinum on 30 December 2016.

In December 2014, the band won the BBC Introducing Award at the inaugural BBC Music Awards and performed "Kathleen".

The Balcony was released in the United States on 6 January 2015, and the following day, Catfish and the Bottlemen made their American television debut, with a performance on the Late Show with David Letterman.

In an interview with WOW247, McCann said that the band already had "three albums written". He continued to say that "I'm more excited for the second album than the first, because the workload is done now".

At the 2016 Brit Awards, the band won the British Breakthrough Act category. In May, they headlined Liverpool Sound City, marking their first headline slot at a festival.

=== 2016–2018: The Ride ===
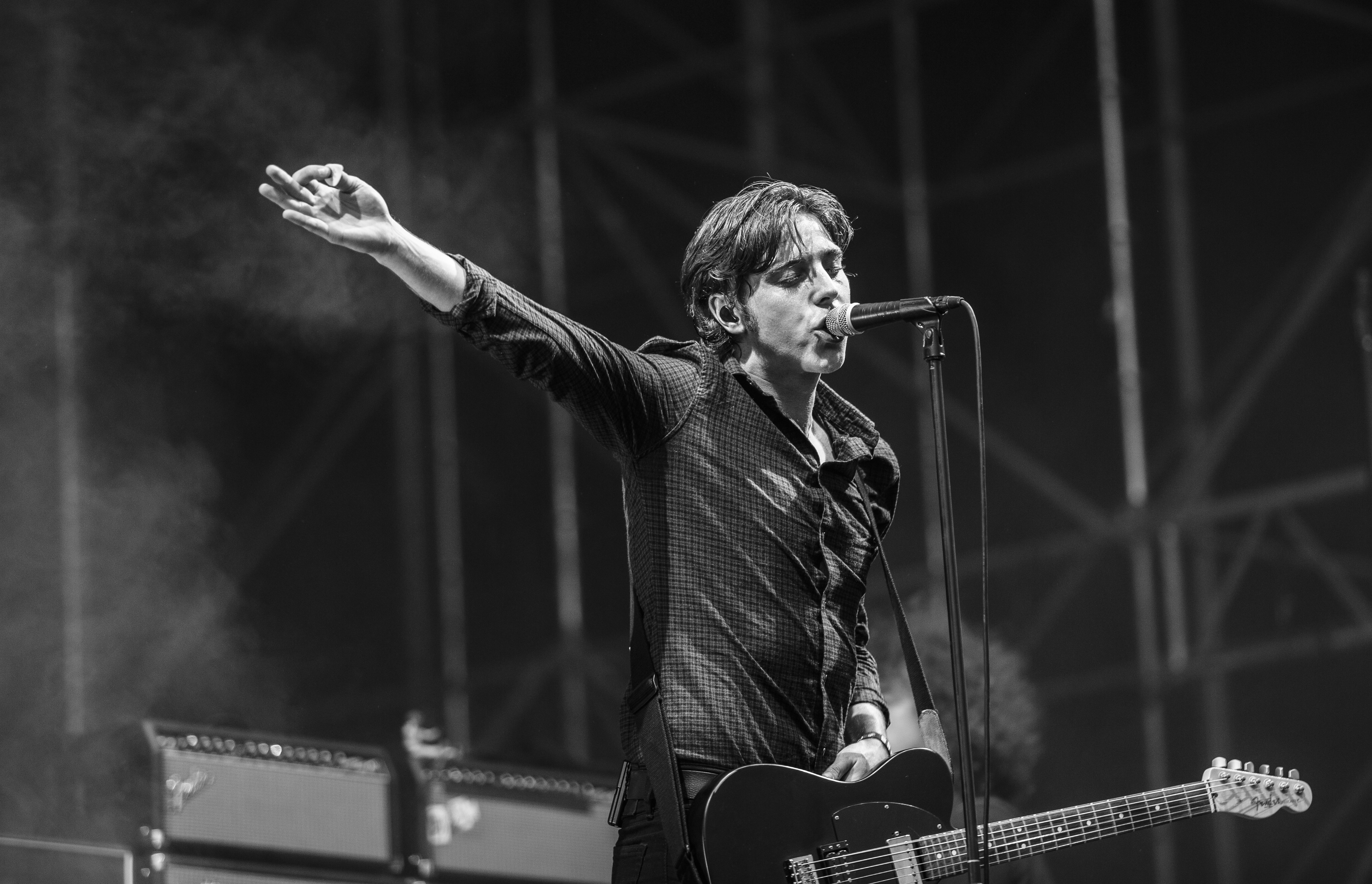
Van McCann at the Festival Internacional de Benicàssim 2016

On 23 March 2016, the band announced via Twitter and Instagram that their second studio album would be titled The Ride, which was subsequently released on 27 May. By 3 June, The Ride had reached number one on the UK Albums Chart, selling 38,000 units in its first week.

On 8 July, Catfish and the Bottlemen played their largest headline show to date at Castlefield Bowl in Manchester, supported by Vant, Broken Hands and Little Comets.

On 1 July 2017, they headlined the inaugural Community Festival at Finsbury Park, London.

=== 2019–2022: The Balance ===
On 8 January 2019, the band released "Longshot", the lead single from their third studio album, The Balance. The album, along with its artwork and tracklist, was officially announced on 25 January. The second single, "Fluctuate", followed on 13 February, with "2all" and "Conversation" being released on 19 March and 18 April, respectively. The Balance was ultimately released on 26 April.

In August 2021, Catfish and the Bottlemen headlined the Reading and Leeds Festivals for the first time. The following month, in September, they performed at Singleton Park in Swansea and headlined the Neighbourhood Weekender festival in Warrington.

Also in September, it was announced that the band would be supporting Stereophonics at Cardiff's Millennium Stadium, alongside Tom Jones, on 18 December. Due to 'phenomenal' demand, an additional date was added for 17 December. However, just over a week before the first date, the gigs were postponed to 17–18 June 2022 due to COVID-19 restrictions in Wales. Then, on 3 June 2022, only weeks before the rescheduled shows, it was announced that Catfish and the Bottlemen had withdrawn from the gigs due to "unforeseen practical issues".

==== Departure of Bond and Hall ====
On 29 September 2021, drummer Bob Hall announced via Instagram that he would be leaving the band.

On 5 June 2022, Johnny Bond announced via Instagram that he had left the band in March 2021. He cited "recurring behaviour" within the group that he found "intolerable," leading to his departure. Despite leaving, Bond agreed to perform as a session musician for the band's scheduled shows later that year.

=== 2023–present: Return from hiatus, singles and live performances ===
On 23 November 2023, Catfish and the Bottlemen signalled the end of their hiatus by announcing they would be headlining the Reading and Leeds Festivals in August 2024.

On 16 February 2024, the band teased new music for the first time in five years, sharing a brief six-second clip on their Instagram account. This followed an email sent to fans on 12 February with the subject line "Thursday 22nd February", alongside posters appearing in Manchester featuring the phrases "Doors: 5pm" and "Showtime: 6pm".

The single "Showtime" was released on 22 February 2024. Written by McCann and produced by Grammy Award-winning producer Dave Sardy, its release coincided with the announcement of two summer shows at Cardiff Castle on 19 July and Edinburgh Summer Sessions on 24 August. On 11 July, the band made their live return at In The Park Festival in Sefton Park, Liverpool, with Kai Smith joining as touring guitarist in place of Bond and James Compton joining as touring drummer in place of Hall.

On 16 September 2024, EA Sports unveiled the official EA Sports FC 25 Soundtrack, which includes the band’s song "Suntitled". As of May 2026, the track has not been officially released by the band outside of the game.

==== Cancellations and backlash ====
On 1 September 2024, approximately 15 minutes before doors were due to open, the band cancelled their Dublin show at RDS Simmonscourt, with promoters MCD Productions citing "artist illness". The late cancellation drew criticism from fans, particularly those who had travelled long distances for the band’s first Irish performance in five years.

On 4 September, the band cancelled their Australian tour dates, scheduled from 4 to 12 September 2024. Live Nation relayed a statement from the band apologising for the cancellations, attributing them to ongoing illness. The band also cancelled their planned US tour.

Despite the series of cancellations, the band made no official announcement addressing the situation directly, leaving fans seeking further clarification.

==== The Balcony (10 Year Anniversary) release ====
On 13 September 2024, Catfish and the Bottlemen released The Balcony (10 Year Anniversary), featuring the original tracks along with three acoustic renditions of "Kathleen", "Cocoon" and "Pacifier". The anniversary edition also includes "Rango (Single Version)", "Hourglass (Ewan McGregor Cover)" and EP track, "ASA".

==== 2025 summer shows ====
On 23 August 2024, Catfish and the Bottlemen announced two stadium shows for summer 2025, scheduled for 1 August at the Principality Stadium in Cardiff and 3 August at Tottenham Hotspur Stadium in London. These were the band’s first headline performances at stadium-sized venues.

On 27 September 2024, the band announced a performance at Manchester’s Heaton Park scheduled for 13 June 2025. The announcement received mixed reactions, with some fans expressing disappointment following the cancellation of previously scheduled international shows.

The band also performed at Ormeau Park in Belfast on 15 June, Fairview Park in Dublin on 18 June and Glasgow Green on 9 July.

== Musical style ==
When reviewing The Balcony, Scott Kerr of AllMusic compared the band's sound to Johnny Marr, the Cribs, Feeder and Mystery Jets. Ben Homewood of NME noted that McCann's vocal style resembles that of Luke Pritchard from the Kooks. Discussing the musical direction of The Ride, McCann stated, "I feel like everybody started thinking too outside the box trying to be arty and different. We wanted to stay inside the box."

After the release of The Balance, Catfish and the Bottlemen faced some criticism for their "formulaic" songwriting approach.

== Band members ==
Current members

- Van McCann – lead vocals, rhythm guitar (2007–2021, 2024–present), lead guitar (2021, 2024–present)
- Benji Blakeway – bass, backing vocals (2007–2021, 2024–present)

Current touring members

- James Compton – drums, percussion (2024–present)
- Kai Smith – lead guitar, backing vocals (2024–present)

Former members

- Jon Barr – drums, percussion (2007–2010)
- Billy Bibby – lead guitar, backing vocals (2007–2014)
- Bob Hall – drums, percussion (2010–2021)
- Johnny Bond – lead guitar, backing vocals (2014–2021; touring member 2021–2022)

Timeline

== Personal lives ==
Ryan Evan "Van" McCann was born in Widnes, although there has been some confusion around his birthplace, as both media reports and McCann himself in interviews have occasionally stated he was born in Australia. McCann, Matthew Benjamin "Benji" Blakeway, guitar tech Josh "Larry" Lau, and former members Robert "Bob" Hall and William "Billy" Bibby grew up in Llandudno, North Wales.

Bibby, Blakeway, Hall and McCann originally hail from Accrington, Chester, Sheffield and Widnes, respectively, all of which are located within the North of England. They all moved to Llandudno when they were "kids at the age of about 2 or 3".

McCann, along with former member Bibby, attended Ysgol John Bright in Llandudno. Drummer Bob Hall attended Rydal Penrhos School.

Johnny Bond is from North Shields in North East England.

McCann calls himself Van after his and his father's musical hero Van Morrison.

McCann is a supporter of Manchester United, whilst Blakeway supports rival side Liverpool FC.

== Concert tours ==
- The Balcony Tour (2014–2015)
- The Ride Tour (2016–2017)
- Revolution Radio Tour (2017), opening act for Green Day
- The Balance Tour (2019)

== Discography ==
=== Studio albums ===
| Title | Details | Peak chart positions | | | | | | | | | | Certification |
| Title | Details | UK | AUS | BEL | IRE | NZ | SCO | SWI | US | US Alt. | US Rock | Certification |
|---|---|---|---|---|---|---|---|---|---|---|---|---|
| The Balcony | Released: 15 September 2014; Label: Island; Format: CD, LP, digital download | 10 | 51 | — | 78 | — | 11 | — | 121 | 9 | 13 | BPI: 2× Platinum |
| The Ride | Released: 27 May 2016; Label: Island, Capitol; Format: CD, LP, digital download, cassette | 1 | 6 | 145 | 7 | 33 | 1 | 99 | 28 | 2 | 3 | BPI: Platinum |
| The Balance | Released: 26 April 2019; Label: Island, Capitol; Format: CD, LP, digital download, cassette | 2 | 9 | — | 13 | — | 2 | 73 | 159 | 16 | 31 | BPI: Gold |

=== EPs ===
| Year | Title | Label | Format |
|---|---|---|---|
| 2009 | Poetry & Fuel | Size | CD; digital download |
| 2010 | Beautiful Decay | Size | CD; digital download |
| 2013 | Catfish and the Bottlemen | Communion | CD |
| 2014 | Kathleen and the Other Three | Communion | CD; EP |

=== Singles ===
| Title | Year | Peak chart positions | | | | | | | | | | Certifications | Album |
| Title | Year | UK | UK Indie | AUS | BEL | CAN Rock | JPN | MEX Air. | US Alt. | US Main. | US Rock | Certifications | Album |
|---|---|---|---|---|---|---|---|---|---|---|---|---|---|
| "Homesick" | 2013 | 182 | — | — | — | — | — | — | — | — | — | BPI: Gold | The Balcony |
| "Rango" | 2013 | — | — | — | — | — | — | — | — | — | — | BPI: Silver | The Balcony |
| "Kathleen" | 2014 | 110 | 11 | — | — | — | 82 | — | 17 | — | 40 | BPI: 2× Platinum | The Balcony |
| "Fallout" | 2014 | — | — | — | 92 | — | — | — | — | — | — | BPI: Gold | The Balcony |
| "Cocoon" | 2014 | 109 | — | — | 128 | — | — | — | 29 | — | 50 | BPI: 2× Platinum | The Balcony |
| "Pacifier" | 2014 | — | — | — | — | — | — | 45 | — | — | — | BPI: Platinum | The Balcony |
| "Business" | 2014 | — | — | — | — | — | — | — | — | — | — | BPI: Silver | The Balcony |
| "Hourglass" | 2015 | — | — | — | — | — | — | — | — | — | — | BPI: Gold | The Balcony |
| "Soundcheck" | 2016 | 95 | — | — | — | 23 | — | 41 | 11 | 34 | 32 | BPI: Gold | The Ride |
| "7" | 2016 | 81 | — | 133 | — | 46 | — | — | 8 | — | 32 | BPI: Platinum; ARIA: Gold | The Ride |
| "Glasgow" | 2016 | 128 | — | — | — | — | — | — | — | — | — | BPI: Silver | The Ride |
| "Twice" | 2016 | 87 | — | — | — | — | — | — | 32 | — | — | BPI: Gold | The Ride |
| "Outside" | 2017 | — | — | — | — | — | — | — | — | — | — | BPI: Silver | The Ride |
| "Longshot" | 2019 | 25 | — | — | — | 11 | — | — | 2 | — | 16 | BPI: Platinum | The Balance |
| "Fluctuate" | 2019 | 84 | — | — | — | — | — | — | — | — | — | BPI: Silver | The Balance |
| "2all" | 2019 | 57 | — | — | — | 50 | — | — | 7 | — | 39 | BPI: Silver | The Balance |
| "Conversation" | 2019 | 60 | — | — | — | — | — | — | — | — | — | | The Balance |
| "Showtime" | 2024 | 49 | — | — | — | — | — | — | 33 | — | — | | TBA |
| "ASA" | 2024 | — | — | — | — | — | — | — | — | — | — | | The Balcony: 10 Year Anniversary |
"—" denotes a single that did not chart or was not released in that territory.

=== Other charted and certified songs ===
| Title | Year | Peak chart positions | Certifications | Album |
| Title | Year | UK | Certifications | Album |
|---|---|---|---|---|
| "Tyrants" | 2014 | — | BPI: Silver | The Balcony |
| "Anything" | 2016 | — | BPI: Silver | The Ride |
| "Oxygen" | 2016 | — | BPI: Silver | The Ride |
| "Postpone" | 2016 | — | BPI: Silver | The Ride |
| "Encore" | 2019 | 64 | | The Balance |
"—" denotes a single that did not chart or was not released in that territory.

== Awards and nominations ==
| Year | Organisation | Award | Nominated | Result |
|---|---|---|---|---|
| 2014 | BBC Music Awards | BBC Introducing Award | Themselves | Won |
| 2015 | Q Awards | Best Live Act | Themselves | Nominated |
| 2016 | Brit Awards | British Breakthrough Act | Themselves | Won |
| 2016 | NME Awards | Best British Band | Themselves | Nominated |
| 2016 | NME Awards | Best Live Band | Themselves | Nominated |
| 2016 | NME Awards | Best Fan Community | Themselves | Nominated |
| 2016 | Q Awards | Best Track | "Twice" | Nominated |
| 2019 | Radio X | Best of British 2019 | "Cocoon" | No. 50 |
| 2019 | Radio X | Best of British 2019 | "Longshot" | No. 59 |
| 2019 | Radio X | Best of British 2019 | "7" | No. 77 |
| 2020 | Triple J | Hottest 100 of the Decade | "7" | No. 70 |
| 2020 | Triple J | Hottest 100 of the Decade | "Cocoon" | No. 104 |
