= The Ride (Catfish and the Bottlemen album) =

Studio album by Catfish and the Bottlemen
- Released: 27 May 2016
- Studio: Hillside Manor, Los Angeles
- Genre: Alternative rock; indie rock
- Length: 39:40
- Label: Island; Capitol
- Producer: Dave Sardy

Catfish and the Bottlemen chronology
The Balcony (2014)	The Ride (2016)	The Balance (2019)

Singles from The Ride
- 1. "Soundcheck" Released: 16 February 2016; 2. "7" Released: 1 April 2016; 3. "Twice" Released: 20 May 2016; 4. "Outside" Released: 16 January 2017

Professional ratings
Aggregate scores
Source	Rating
Metacritic	60/100
Review scores
Source	Rating
AllMusic	3/5 stars
NME	3/5 stars
The Guardian	2/5 stars
Consequence of Sound	C
Evening Standard	4/5 stars

The Ride is the second studio album by Welsh indie rock band Catfish and the Bottlemen. It was released on 27 May 2016 through Island Records in the United Kingdom and Capitol Records in the United States. The album was produced by Dave Sardy, who has previously worked with bands such as Oasis, Jet and Wolfmother. It received generally mixed reviews upon release, however, it became their first number one album on the UK Albums Chart. The Ride was promoted by four singles: "Soundcheck", "7", "Twice" and "Outside", the second of which became the band's highest charting UK single at the time.

== Track listing ==
Lyrics by Van McCann and music by Catfish and the Bottlemen.

All music is composed by Van McCann.

No.	Title	Length
1.	"7"	4:16
2.	"Twice"	3:16
3.	"Soundcheck"	4:21
4.	"Postpone"	4:05
5.	"Anything"	4:09
6.	"Glasgow"	2:36
7.	"Oxygen"	2:49
8.	"Emily"	2:18
9.	"Red"	3:48
10.	"Heathrow"	2:51
11.	"Outside"	5:11
Total length:		39:40

== Personnel ==
Credits adapted from The Ride liner notes.

Catfish and the Bottlemen

- Van McCann – vocals, guitar
- Johnny Bond – guitar
- Benji Blakeway – bass
- Bob Hall – drums

Production

- Dave Sardy - production, mixing
- Jordan Curtis Hughes - photography
- Tim Lahan - artwork

== Charts and certifications ==
=== Weekly charts ===
Chart (2016)	Peak position
Australian Albums (ARIA)	6
Belgian Albums (Ultratop Flanders)	145
Belgian Albums (Ultratop Wallonia)	119
Canadian Albums (Billboard)	50
Irish Albums (IRMA)	7
New Zealand Albums (RMNZ)	33
Swiss Albums (Schweizer Hitparade)	99
UK Albums (Official Charts)	1
US Billboard 200	28

=== Year-end charts ===
Chart (2016)	Position
UK Albums (OCC)	41
Chart (2017)	Position
UK Albums (OCC)	89

=== Certifications ===
Region	Certification	Certified units/sales
United Kingdom (BPI)	Platinum	300,000^{‡}
^{‡} Sales+streaming figures based on certification alone.
