= The Judes =

Canadian indie rock band

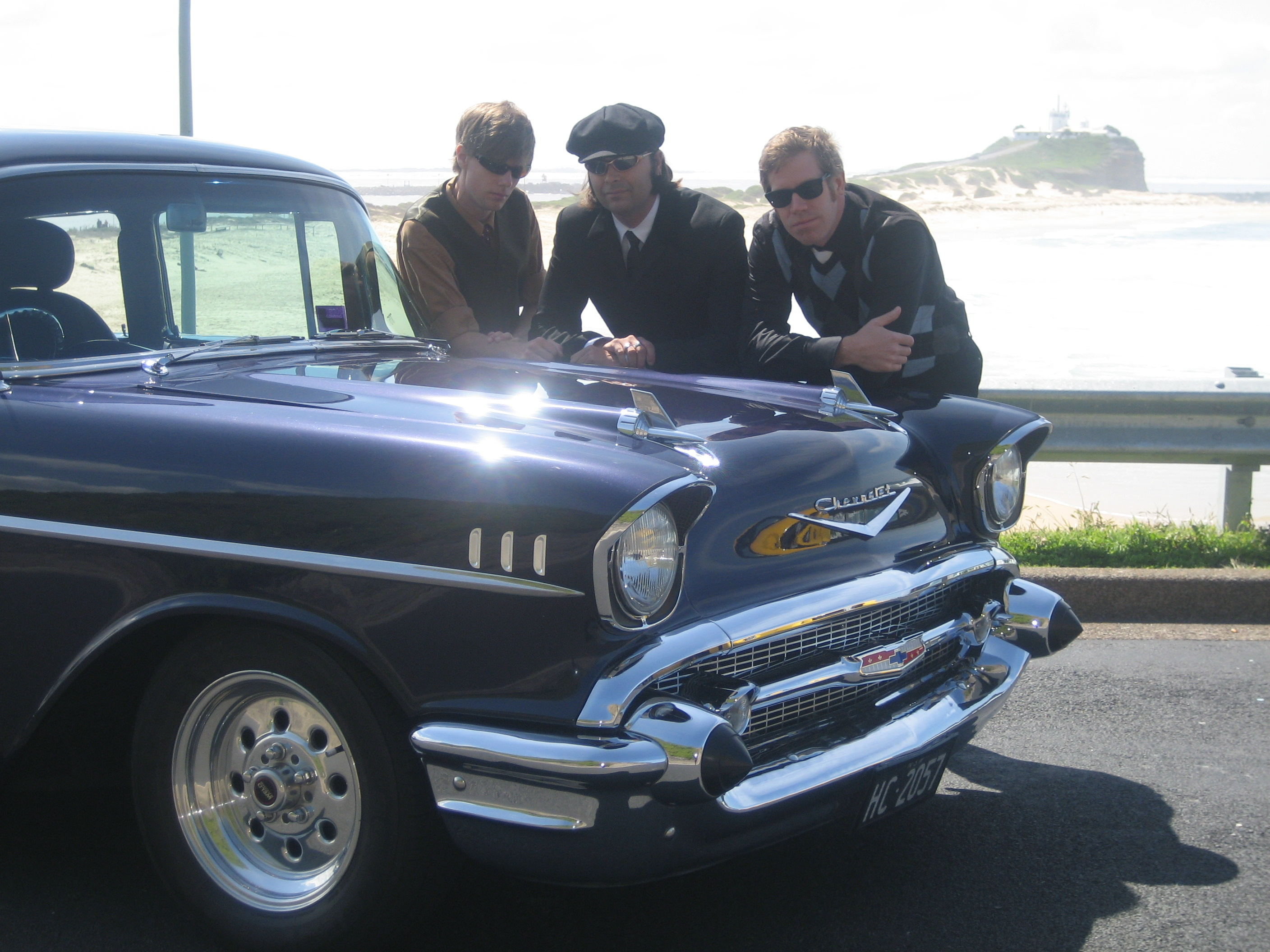
- The Judes in 2008

Background information
- Origin: Winnipeg, Manitoba, Canada
- Genres: Indie rock; pop rock; power pop
- Years active: 2007–present
- Labels: Blue Pie Productions, Jam Space Records
- Members: Jim Anderson; Michael Dickson; Cory Pritchard
- Past members: Romi Topper
- Website: thejudesmusic.net

The Judes are a Canadian indie rock band formed in 2007 in Winnipeg by Cory Pritchard (bass guitar, vocals) Jim Anderson (guitars, vocals), and Romi Topper (drums, vocals). Michael Dickson later replaced Topper on drums.

== History ==
After their musical project In Reverse ended, Cory Pritchard and Jim Anderson decided that a new band and a new approach was needed. Taking their love for 1950s and 1960s music, they formed a band that not only covered the likes of Buddy Holly and Elvis Presley but also recorded original material. The duo recruited multi-instrumentalist Romi Topper as their drummer. They entered the studio in the summer of 2007 and in 2008, released the EP Sunflower.

In early 2008, the Judes came to the attention of American producer David Grahame, who went on to produce three songs with them: "Someone Like You", "Bide Your Time", and "Beautiful and True". The band credits him with being instrumental in helping them define their sound.

Myspace played a large role in the success of the Judes. Using the social networking site, the band posted demos they recorded in their basement rehearsal space. These demos garnered support in Australia and eventually connected the group with their Australian manager, Sara Smithson. Working with Smithson, the band was able to establish a loyal fan base overseas and subsequently plan and complete a tour in mid-2008.

== Sunflower ==
In July 2008, the Judes released a six-track EP titled Sunflower. On the strength of the David Grahame-produced track "Someone Like You", the band embarked on their first overseas tour.

== 2008 Australian tour ==
In the summer of 2008, it was announced that due to prior commitments, Romi Topper had left the band. He was replaced in August 2008 by Michael Dickson, two weeks before the band's Australian tour.

From September 4 to 16 the Judes completed a tour around the southeast coast of Australia. They played fifteen shows in two weeks, before completing the tour in Canada. Featured on the tour was a show played at Warner Bay School, the winners of the Revolution on Film competition, where students created videos to songs on the Sunflower EP. Following the tour, the band signed a deal with Australian label Blue Pie Productions.

== Studio albums ==
After a successful tour of Australia as well as stops in the UK, Ireland, Poland, and France, the Judes returned to the studio with producer David Grahame record and produce the follow-up to Sunflower. Most of the songs were written and rehearsed during the early months of 2011. Pre-production began in late spring, with recording finishing up in early summer. Both the mixing and artwork were completed by the fall of 2011, and the band released the single "Let's Fall in Love Again" in late November. During this time, the group did not renew its contract with their but decided to release the upcoming album independently. All That Is the Judes was officially released on April 14, 2012.

On Canadian Remembrance Day, November 11, 2014, the group released their second full-length studio album, Generation Who.
