= Billy Bibby & The Wry Smiles =

British rock band

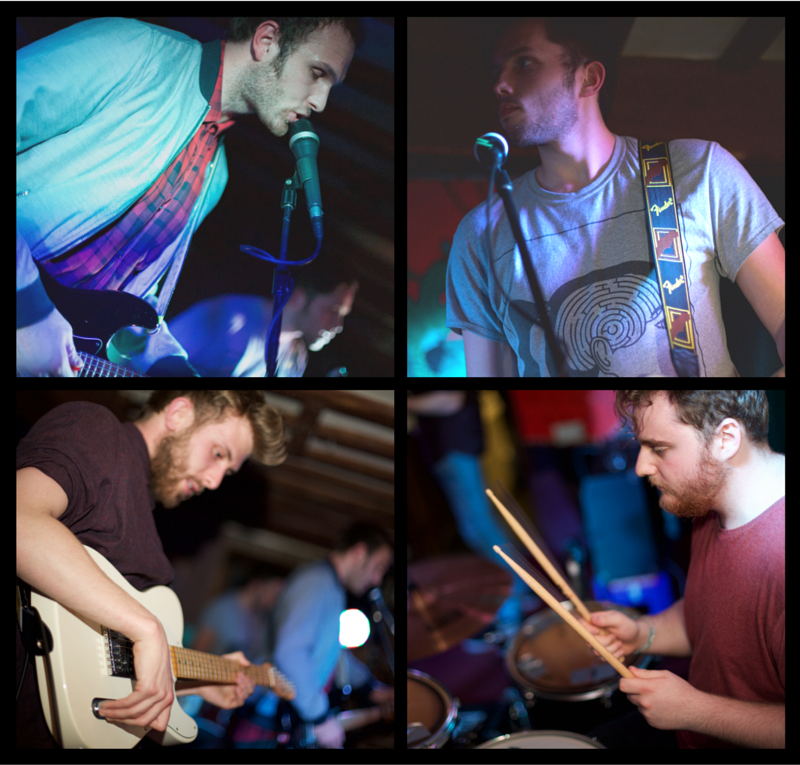
- Billy Bibby & The Wry Smiles at Telford's Warehouse

Background information
- Origin: Llandudno, North Wales, United Kingdom
- Genres: Rock
- Years active: 2015–present
- Label: Unsigned
- Members: Billy Bibby; Thomas Hill; Matt Thomas; Ailís Mackay
- Past members: Rob Jones; Mike Pearce

Billy Bibby & The Wry Smiles are a British rock band formed in the autumn of 2015 in the area around Llandudno, North Wales and Chester, England.

== Background ==
Billy Bibby names Elvis Presley, Fleetwood Mac, Mark Knopfler of Dire Straits, Noel Gallagher, and George Harrison of The Beatles as key musical influences.

The band is fronted by Billy Bibby, former lead guitarist and founding member of Catfish and the Bottlemen. In 2014, Billy Bibby began writing songs and playing acoustic shows in various UK cities in order to test public response to his new music. In the spring of 2015, Billy Bibby began seeking musicians to form a new band. Auditions were conducted with the help of Simon Jones, formerly of The Verve, and his business partner James Coe, at their recording studio (Faktory Studios) in Great Barrow, Chester. Band members Rob Jones (lead guitar), Matt Thomas (bass), and Michael Pearce (drums) were selected to form the original lineup of the four-piece ensemble. On 3 February 2018, Thomas Hill (lead guitar) and Ailís Mackay (drums) played their first live gig with the band at Nambucca in London, replacing former members Rob Jones and Michael Pearce.

Billy Bibby & The Wry Smiles released their debut single "Waitin' for You" on 3 November 2015. The song has received radio play on BBC Radio Wales, Radio X, UIC Radio Chicago, RKC, and other independent radio stations. The band played their first live show at Telford's Warehouse in Chester, UK on 28 November 2015 and toured extensively throughout the UK playing more than 70 shows in 2016. Billy Bibby & The Wry Smiles released their debut EP Bide Your Time on 5 February 2016. It was recorded at Orange Sound Recording Studio in Penmaenmawr, North Wales with record producer Russ Hayes who had previously worked with Bibby on two EPs released by Catfish and the Bottlemen. All songs on the debut EP are written by Billy Bibby. On 17 June 2016, the band released another single produced by Hayes called "Are You Ready?". The song received advance radio play by Adam Walton of BBC Radio Wales and Jo Good of Radio X as well as coverage by NME and emerging music websites such as XS Noize and Best New Bands. On 27 January 2017, a third single, "Substitute" was released. It was immediately playlisted on BBC Radio Wales, Virgin Radio UK. and Indie FM 103.1 Los Angeles. The single "Always Something" was released 31 March 2017, coinciding with two summer 2017 festival announcements: a headline slot on the Crystal Stage at Tramlines Festival 2017 and an appearance on the Calling Out Stage at Kendal Calling 2017.

On 9 November 2016, it was announced by BBC Music that Billy Bibby & The Wry Smiles had been awarded Horizons Launchpad 2016 funding for new music development. Billy Bibby and Matt Thomas were interviewed by Eleri Siôn of BBC Radio Wales about the award the same day. On 31 January 2017, the band announced in a second interview with Eleri Siôn of BBC Radio Wales that the band had been awarded a grant from Arts Council of Wales for audience development over the next six months.

In mid-2019 Bibby and Hill formed a new band, HAiG, with bass player Carl Rutherford and drummer Joe Mooney.

== Discography ==
=== EPs ===
Year	Title	Label	Format
2016	Bide Your Time	Independent	CD; digital download

=== Singles ===
Year	Title	Label	Format
2015	"Waitin' for You"	Independent	Digital download
2016	"Are You Ready?"	Independent	CD; digital download
2017	"Substitute"	Independent	Digital download
2017	"Always Something"	Independent	Digital download
2017	"Hamburg"	Independent	Digital download
