= Like I Used To (album) =

Studio album by Lucy Rose
- Released: 24 September 2012
- Recorded: 2011–2012
- Length: 40:09
- Label: Columbia
- Producers: Charlie Hugall, Lucy Rose Parton, Björn Ågren

Lucy Rose chronology
Like I Used To (2012)	Work It Out (2015)

Professional ratings
Review scores
Source	Rating
Clash	8/10
The Daily Telegraph	4/5 stars
MusicOMH	4/5 stars

Like I Used To is the debut studio album by English singer-songwriter Lucy Rose. It was released on 24 September 2012 by Columbia Records. It reached number 13 in the UK Albums Chart in its first week of release.

== Track listing ==
No.	Title	Length
1.	"Red Face"	3:33
2.	"Middle of the Bed"	3:11
3.	"Lines"	3:38
4.	"Shiver"	3:53
5.	"Night Bus"	3:24
6.	"Watch Over"	3:31
7.	"Bikes"	3:35
8.	"Place"	3:48
9.	"Don't You Worry"	3:50
10.	"First"	3:49
11.	"Be Alright"	3:57
Total length:		40:09

Deluxe Version bonus tracks
No.	Title	Length
12.	"All I've Got"	3:19
13.	"Scar"	4:05
14.	"Little Brave"	3:09
15.	"Gamble"	4:14
Total length:		54:56

== Charts ==
Chart (2012)	Peak position
Irish Albums (IRMA)	90
Scottish Albums (Official Charts)	31
UK Albums (Official Charts)	13
UK Album Downloads (Official Charts)	15
