= Communion Music =

British independent music company

Communion Music is a British independent music company that includes a record label, (Communion Records), a publishing company (Communion Publishing) and a concert promoter (Communion Presents).

== History ==
Communion Music was founded by musicians Kevin Jones (Bear's Den), Ben Lovett (Mumford and Sons) and producer Ian Grimble. It began in 2006 as Communion Clubnight, a monthly live music performance at London's Notting Hill Arts Club. Frustrated by what they felt was an overly competitive and often artist-unfriendly live music scene in London, the founders wanted to create a music platform in an environment that was creative, collaborative and respectful.

== Communion Records ==
Communion Records initially started as a record label for the community involved in Communion Clubnight. Its first release was a compilation album, Communion, featuring music from the likes of Mumford and Sons, Johnny Flynn, Elena Tonra (Daughter) and Andrew Davie (Bears Den).

In 2010, the label launched in earnest with its first artist release – Matthew and the Atlas's EP, To the North. Communion Records went on to independently release debut EPs and singles by Michael Kiwanuka, Ben Howard, Gotye, Daughter, Matt Corby and more, with Grimble and Jones often playing on and producing these releases.

Under a two-year partnership with Island Records, Communion Records released its first albums. These came from Catfish and the Bottlemen Deap Vally, Edward Sharpe and the Magnetic Zeros, and Half Moon Run. The former's debut album, The Balcony, sold approximately 400,000 copies worldwide and saw the band winning a 2016 Brit Award for Best British Breakthrough.

In 2015, Communion Records signed a new distribution deal with Universal Music's Caroline International, through which it released music from Bear's Den, Rukhsana Merrise, Tamino, Dizzy, Lucy Rose, Foreign Fields, and Matthew and the Atlas.

In 2021 Communion Records started working with global distribution company Believe Music. In this time Communion has become home to multiple new artists, including Wunderhorse, Matt Corby, The Staves, Lucia & The Best Boys, LAUREL, Nectar Woode, Lucy Rose, DellaXOZ and Chartreuse.

2025 saw the start of a new global partnership distribution deal with The Orchard.

Communion Records has also partnered with three burgeoning labels: So Young Records (Cardinals, Folly Group, Lime Garden, VLURE, Nightbus + more), Matt Maltese's Last Recordings On Earth (Searows, Katie Gregson-MacLeod, Hetta Falzon) and Lucy Rose’s Real Kind Records (Samantha Crain, Bess Atwell, Hannah Georgas).

=== Compilations ===
Communion Records has released three other compilations.

- The Flowerpot Sessions (May 2011), which was the product of a week-long collaboration between 23 artists. Communion took over the now-closed North London pub, The Flowerpot, and facilitated a week of live performances, writing sessions and recording on-site. Artists included Angus & Julia Stone, Damien Rice, Mt. Desolation, Lissie and Marcus Foster.
- New Faces (March 2012) Communion's third compilation, New Faces was a cherry-picked selection of music that Communion was excited about – a look back at the previous year's best new music, and a look forward to what was coming next year. It featured artists including Michael Kiwanuka, Matt Corby, Bear's Den, Dan Croll and Joe Banfi.
- Commun10n (March 2016) was released to mark the 10th anniversary of Communion. Released as a very limited 12" vinyl, side one features a best of Communion Records previous releases, and side two features a selection of new artists on the roster. It was released in conjunction with Record Store Day.

== Communion Presents ==
Communion Presents is an independent concert promoter in London. Like Communion Records, it emerged from the Communion Clubnight and has grown to represent over 150 artists across a diverse range of genres. These include the likes of Sam Fender, Olivia Dean, George Ezra, Tems, Noah Kahan, Michael Kiwanuka, Ben Howard, Gabriels, Maggie Rogers, Maisie Peters, Bastille and many more.

In 2012, Communion Presents produced the notable Austin to Boston tour, featuring Bear’s Den, The Staves, Nathaniel Rateliff and Ben Howard. This was later made into an award-winning documentary of the same name. From 2015 - 2020 Communion Presents curated a weekly new music show on Radio X, an independent radio station in London. It aired on Sunday evenings from 10pm and was hosted by Maz Tappuni.

== Communion Publishing ==
Communion Publishing is an independent music publisher, administered by Kobalt. Writers on the roster include Catfish and the Bottlemen, Bear's Den, Jamie Clarke (Sfven), Dizzy, LAUREL, HONEYMOAN, Matthew Hegarty, Aodhan and Wunderhorse.
