= Jamie T discography =

Discography

- Studio albums: 5
- Extended plays: 8
- Live albums: 2
- Singles: 11
- Music videos: 16

The discography of Jamie T includes five studio albums, two live albums, eight extended plays (EPs), eleven singles and sixteen music videos.

== Albums ==
=== Studio albums ===
Title	Details	Peak chart positions					Sales	Certifications (sales thresholds)
Title	Details	UK	AUS	IRE	SWE	SWI	Sales	Certifications (sales thresholds)
Panic Prevention	Released: 29 January 2007; Label: Virgin (V 3023); Format(s): CD, LP, digital download, streaming	4	88	57	46	—	UK: 322,546	BPI: Platinum
Kings & Queens	Released: 7 September 2009; Label: Virgin (V 3059); Format(s): CD, LP, digital download, streaming	2	17	—	—	83	UK: 188,480	BPI: Gold
Carry on the Grudge	Released: 29 September 2014; Label: Virgin, Epitaph; Format(s): CD, LP, digital download, streaming	4	35	—	—	—	UK: 132,183	BPI: Gold
Trick	Released: 2 September 2016; Label: Virgin, Epitaph; Format(s): CD, LP, digital download, streaming	3	35	100	—	—		
The Theory of Whatever	Released: 22 July 2022; Label: Polydor; Format(s): CD, LP, cassette, digital download, streaming	1	—	—	—	—	UK: 42,928	
Ghosts (100 Days of Morning)	Released: 9 October 2026; Label: Polydor; Format(s): CD, LP, cassette, digital download, streaming	1	—	—	—	—		
"—" denotes a recording that did not chart or was not released in that territory.

=== Live albums ===
- Panic Prevention Disco: Live @ The Scala (2007)
- Live at Brixton Academy 5 Feb 2010 (2010)

=== DJ mix albums ===
- Panic Prevention, Vol. 1 (2005)
- Panic Prevention, Vol. 2 (2005)
- Panic Prevention, Vol. 3 (2006)

=== EPs ===
- Betty and the Selfish Sons (2006)
- Exclusive Live Session (2007)
- iTunes Festival: London 2009 (2009)
- MTV.co.uk Live Session (2009)
- Sticks 'n' Stones (2009) – UK No. 15, AUS No. 94
- Chaka Demus (2009) – UK No. 23
- The Man's Machine (2009)
- Magnolia Melancholia (2015)
- B Sides (06-17) (2018)

== Singles ==
Title	Year	Peak chart positions		Certifications	Album
Title	Year	UK	EST Air.	Certifications	Album
"Sheila"	2006	15	*	BPI: Platinum	Panic Prevention
"If You Got the Money"	2006	13	*	BPI: Gold	Panic Prevention
"Calm Down Dearest"	2007	9	*		Panic Prevention
"Sticks 'n' Stones"	2009	15	*	BPI: Platinum	Kings & Queens
"Chaka Demus"	2009	23	*		Kings & Queens
"The Man's Machine"	2009	134	*		Kings & Queens
"Emily's Heart"	2010	182	*		Kings & Queens
"Don't You Find"	2014	—	*		Carry on the Grudge
"Zombie"	2014	36	*	BPI: Platinum	Carry on the Grudge
"Rabbit Hole"	2015	—	*		Carry on the Grudge
"Tinfoil Boy"	2016	—	—		Trick
"Power Over Men"	2016	—	—		Trick
"Tescoland"	2016	—	—		Trick
"The Old Style Raiders"	2022	—	—		The Theory of Whatever
"St. George Wharf Tower"	2022	—	—		The Theory of Whatever
"Between The Rocks"	2022	—	—		The Theory of Whatever
"Hippodrome"	2023	—	—		Non-album single
"Lights Burn Dimmer" (with Fred Again)	2026	—	—		USB
"3310"	2026	—	88		Ghosts (100 Days of Morning)
"—" denotes a recording that did not chart or was not released in that territory.

=== Promotional singles ===
- "So Lonely Was the Ballad" / "Back in the Game" (2005)
- "Salvador" / "Livin' with Betty" (2006)
- "Turn to Monsters" ("Kids with Guns" remix) (2006)
- "Runnin' 'Round the Town" (2009) (Note: Treays was stricken with laryngitis and forced to reschedule several tour dates as a result. He released this song exclusively on MySpace and to his e-mail list as a downloadable non-album bonus track, which earned positive feedback.)

== Music videos ==
Year	Title	Director(s)
2005	"So Lonely Was the Ballad"	Joe Marcatonio
2005	"Back in the Game"	Joe Marcatonio
2006	"Salvador"	Nima Nourizadeh
2006	"Sheila"	Nima Nourizadeh
2006	"If You Got the Money"	Toby Macdonald
2006	"Calm Down Dearest"	Nima Nourizadeh
2007	"Sheila" (2007 version)	Adam Smith
2009	"Fire Fire"	Adam Powell
2009	"Sticks 'n' Stones"	Adam Powell
2009	"Chaka Demus"	Adam Powell
2009	"The Man's Machine"	Adam Powell
2010	"Emily's Heart"	Adam Powell
2014	"Don't You Find"	Joost Vandebrug
2014	"Zombie"	James Slater
2016	"Tinfoil Boy"	Tom Beard
2016	"Power Over Men"	Tom Beard
2022	"The Old Style Raiders"	Niall Trask
2022	"St. George Wharf Tower"	Jacob Erland

== Other appearances ==
=== Compilation appearances ===
- The Saturday Sessions: The Dermot O'Leary Show (2007) – "A New England"
- Triple J's Like a Version, Vol. 4 (2008) – "Hoover Street"
- Radio 1's Live Lounge, Vol. 4 (2009) – "If I Were a Boy"

=== Guest appearances ===
- Babyshambles & Friends – "Janie Jones (Strummerville)" (2006)
- Larrikin Love – The Freedom Spark (2006) (on "Well, Love Does Furnish a Life")
- The BPA – "Same as they Came" (2008)
- The BPA – I Think We're Gonna Need a Bigger Boat (2009) (on "Local Town")
- Tim Armstrong – Tim Timebomb and Friends (2012) (on "Wrongful Suspicion")
- Beatsteaks – Yours (2017) (on "Hate To Love")
- Dylan Cartlidge – Scratch, Sniff - Single (2018) (uncredited on "Up & Upside Down", also co-writer)

=== Remixes ===
- Gorillaz – "Kids with Guns" (Jamie T's Turns to Monsters remix) (2006)
- Hot Club de Paris – "Shipwreck" (Stormy Weather mix by Jamie T & Ben Bones) (2007)
- Florence and the Machine – "Rabbit Heart (Raise It Up)" (Jamie T's Lionheart remix) (2009)
- Rum Shebeen – "Tropical" (Jamie T/Ben Bones Bombay mix) (2010)
