= List of interpolated songs =

List of songs that used a part (or parts) of another song

This list is of songs that have been interpolated by other songs. Songs that are cover versions, parodies, or use samples of other songs are not "interpolations". The list is organized under the name of the artist whose song is interpolated followed by the title of the song, and then the interpolating artist and their song.

== Listing ==
| Interpolated artist | Interpolated song | Interpolating artist | Interpolating song | Ref. |
|---|---|---|---|---|
| 50 Cent | "Many Men (Wish Death)" | Pop Smoke | "Got It on Me" | |
| 50 Cent | "Candy Shop" | Pop Smoke feat. 50 Cent and Roddy Ricch | "The Woo" | |
| ABBA | "Lay All Your Love on Me" | Vengaboys | "Boom, Boom, Boom, Boom!!" | |
| A-ha | "Take On Me" | Pitbull feat. Christina Aguilera | "Feel This Moment" | |
| Albert E. Brumley | "I'll Fly Away" | Puff Daddy and Faith Evans feat. 112 | "I'll Be Missing You" | |
| Andrea Bocelli | "Con te partirò" | Jason Derulo and David Guetta feat. Nicki Minaj and Willy William | "Goodbye" | |
| Aphex Twin | "Avril 14th" | Kanye West | "Blame Game" | |
| Aqua | "Barbie Girl" | Ludacris feat. Jeremih and Wiz Khalifa | "Party Girls" | |
| Aqua | "Barbie Girl" | Ava Max | "Not Your Barbie Girl" | |
| Aqua | "Lollipop (Candyman)" | Major Lazer feat. Ariana Grande | "All My Love" | |
| A Touch of Class | "Around the World (La La La La La)" | Ava Max | "My Head & My Heart" | |
| A Touch of Class | "Around the World (La La La La La)" | Pitbull feat. DJ IAMCHINO | "Discoteca" | |
| Baby Bash feat. Frankie J | "Suga Suga" | Robin Schulz feat. Francesco Yates | "Sugar" | |
| Baby Bash feat. Frankie J | "Suga Suga" | Lorde | "If She Could See Us Now" | |
| Backstreet Boys | "I Want It That Way" | Lil Uzi Vert | "That Way" | |
| The Banana Splits | "The Tra La La Song (One Banana, Two Banana)" | Jamie T | "Chaka Demus" | |
| The Beatles | "She Loves You" | The Beatles | "All You Need Is Love" | |
| The Beatles | "Yesterday" | The Beatles | "All You Need Is Love" | |
| Claude Joseph Rouget de Lisle | "La Marseillaise" | The Beatles | "All You Need Is Love" | |
| Glenn Miller | "In the Mood" | The Beatles | "All You Need Is Love" | |
| Johann Sebastian Bach | "Invention No. 8" | The Beatles | "All You Need Is Love" | |
| Richard Jones | "Greensleeves" | The Beatles | "All You Need Is Love" | |
| The Beatles | "Day Tripper" | April Wine | "I Like to Rock" | |
| The Rolling Stones | "I Can't Get No Satisfaction" | April Wine | "I Like to Rock" | |
| The Beatles | "Here, There and Everywhere" | Frank Ocean | "White Ferrari" | |
| The Beatles | "A Day in the Life" | David Bowie | "Young Americans" | |
| The Beatles | "While My Guitar Gently Weeps" | Wu-Tang Clan | "The Heart Gently Weeps" | |
| The Beatles | "Taxman" | The Jam | "Start!" | |
| Ben E. King | "Stand by Me" | Jason Derulo feat. Meghan Trainor | "Hands on Me" | |
| Beoga | "Minute 5" | Ed Sheeran | "Galway Girl" | |
| Big Sean | "I Don't Fuck with You" | Big Sean | "Single Again" | |
| Bill Medley and Jennifer Warnes | "(I've Had) The Time of My Life" | Black Eyed Peas | "The Time (Dirty Bit)" | |
| Billy Joel | "Uptown Girl" | Usher | "Can't Stop Won't Stop" | |
| Bob Marley | "Mr. Brown" | Shaggy | "Why You Treat Me So Bad" | |
| Bob Marley | "No Woman, No Cry" | Naughty by Nature | "Everything's Gonna Be Alright" | |
| Bob Marley | "No Woman, No Cry" | Maroon 5 | "Memories" | |
| Johann Pachelbel | "Canon in D" | Maroon 5 | "Memories" | |
| Bonnie Tyler | "If You Were a Woman (And I Was a Man)" | Bon Jovi | "You Give Love a Bad Name" | |
| Bonnie Tyler | "If You Were a Woman (And I Was a Man)" | Ava Max | "Kings & Queens" | |
| Bobby Womack | "If You Think You're Lonely Now" | Mariah Carey | "We Belong Together" | |
| The Deele | "Two Occasions" | Mariah Carey | "We Belong Together" | |
| Bootsy Collins | "I'd Rather Be with You" | Adina Howard | "Freak Like Me" | |
| Brenda Russell | "Piano in the Dark" | Bingo Players | "Cry (Just a Little)" | |
| Britney Spears | "...Baby One More Time" | Anne-Marie | "2002" | |
| Britney Spears | "Oops!... I Did It Again" | Anne-Marie | "2002" | |
| Dr. Dre feat. Snoop Dogg | "The Next Episode" | Anne-Marie | "2002" | |
| Jay-Z | "99 Problems" | Anne-Marie | "2002" | |
| Nelly feat. City Spud | "Ride wit Me" | Anne-Marie | "2002" | |
| NSYNC | "Bye Bye Bye" | Anne-Marie | "2002" | |
| Britney Spears | "Lucky" | Halsey | "Lucky" | |
| Monica | "Angel of Mine" | Halsey | "Lucky" | |
| Britney Spears | "Everytime" | Charli XCX | "Spring Breakers" | |
| Cajmere | "Percolator" | City Girls | "Twerkulator" | |
| Camille Saint-Saëns | "Mon cœur s'ouvre à ta voix" | Muse | "I Belong to You (+Mon Cœur S'ouvre a ta Voix)" | |
| The Cardigans | "Lovefool" | Justin Bieber | "Love Me" | |
| Cautious Clay | "Cold War" | Taylor Swift | "London Boy" | |
| Cecil Mack and James P. Johnson | "Charleston" | will.i.am | "Bang Bang" | |
| Cher | "Bang Bang (My Baby Shot Me Down)" | will.i.am | "Bang Bang" | |
| Chaka Demus & Pliers | "Murder She Wrote" | Omarion feat. Chris Brown and Jhené Aiko | "Post to Be" | |
| Chaka Demus & Pliers | "Murder She Wrote" | Pitbull feat. Sensato and Osmani García | "El Taxi" | |
| Chaka Demus & Pliers | "Murder She Wrote" | Jason Derulo | "Too Hot" | |
| Chic | "Good Times" | The Sugarhill Gang | "Rapper's Delight" | |
| Love De-Luxe | "Here Comes That Sound Again" | The Sugarhill Gang | "Rapper's Delight" | |
| Chic | "Good Times" | Da Click | "Good Rhymes" | |
| Luther Vandross | "Never Too Much" | Da Click | "Good Rhymes" | |
| Chip Taylor | "Angel of the Morning" | Shaggy feat. Rayvon | "Angel" | |
| Christina Aguilera | "Genie in a Bottle" | Camila Cabello | "Crying in the Club" | |
| Chuck Berry | "You Can't Catch Me" | The Beatles | "Come Together" | |
| Chuck Brown | "Bustin' Loose" | Nelly | "Hot In Herre" | |
| Claude Joseph Rouget de Lisle | "La Marseillaise" | Robert Schumann | "Allegro" | |
| Claude Joseph Rouget de Lisle | "La Marseillaise" | Pyotr Ilyich Tchaikovsky | "1812 Overture" | |
| Claude Joseph Rouget de Lisle | "La Marseillaise" | Julián Felipe | "Marcha Filipina-Magdalo" | |
| Claude Joseph Rouget de Lisle | "La Marseillaise" | Sarah Schachner | "Rather Death Than Slavery" | |
| The Clovers | "Lovey Dovey" | Steve Miller Band | "The Joker" | |
| Corona | "The Rhythm of the Night" | Bastille | "Of the Night" | |
| Snap! | "Rhythm Is a Dancer" | Bastille | "Of the Night" | |
| Craig David | "Fill Me In" | Justin Bieber | "Recovery" | |
| The Cure | "Let's Go to Bed" | Rihanna | "S&M" | |
| The Cure | "Close To Me" | Sufjan Stevens | "Come On! Feel the Illinoise!" | |
| Daddy Yankee | "Ella Me Levantó" | Anuel AA, Daddy Yankee and Karol G feat. Ozuna and J Balvin | "China" | |
| Daft Punk | "One More Time" | Drake feat. 21 Savage | "Circo Loco" | |
| David Bowie | "Andy Warhol" | Metallica | "Master of Puppets" | |
| David Bowie | "Rebel Rebel" | Chris Young | "Young Love & Saturday Nights" | |
| Dead or Alive | "You Spin Me Round (Like a Record)" | Flo Rida feat. Kesha | "Right Round" | |
| DeBarge | "I Like It" | Nelly feat. City Spud | "Ride wit Me" | |
| The Delfonics | "Ready or Not Here I Come (Can't Hide from Love)" | Fugees | "Ready or Not" | |
| Diana Ross | "Upside Down" | Alcazar | "This Is the World We Live In" | |
| Genesis | "Land of Confusion" | Alcazar | "This Is the World We Live In" | |
| Dido | "Thank You" | Rihanna | "Never Ending" | |
| Dido | "Thank You" | Kendo Kaponi and Anuel AA | "Me contagié" | |
| DJ Pied Piper and the Masters of Ceremonies | "Do You Really Like It?" | KSI feat. Craig David and Digital Farm Animals | "Really Love" | |
| DJ Pied Piper and the Masters of Ceremonies | "Do You Really Like It?" | Tinie Tempah feat. Maia Wright | "Love Me Like This" | |
| The Drifters | "On Broadway" | Genesis | "The Lamb Lies Down on Broadway" | |
| Dua Lipa | "Be the One" | Ellie Goulding | "Power" | |
| Eiffel 65 | "Blue (Da Ba Dee)" | Flo Rida feat. Wynter Gordon | "Sugar" | |
| Eiffel 65 | "Blue (Da Ba Dee)" | Nea | "Some Say" | |
| Eiffel 65 | "Blue (Da Ba Dee)" | David Guetta and Bebe Rexha | "I'm Good (Blue)" | |
| Eiffel 65 | "Blue (Da Ba Dee)" | Lil Uzi Vert feat. Nicki Minaj | "Endless Fashion" | |
| Elton John | "Your Song" | Aloe Blacc | "The Man" | |
| Elton John | "Your Song" | The Weeknd | "Scared to Live" | |
| Elton John | "Tiny Dancer" | Elton John and Britney Spears | "Hold Me Closer" | |
| Elton John | "The One" | Elton John and Britney Spears | "Hold Me Closer" | |
| Elton John and Kiki Dee | "Don't Go Breaking My Heart" | Elton John and Britney Spears | "Hold Me Closer" | |
| Elton John | "Rocket Man" | Elton John and Dua Lipa | "Cold Heart (Pnau remix)" | |
| Elton John | "Where's the Shoorah?" | Elton John and Dua Lipa | "Cold Heart (Pnau remix)" | |
| Elton John | "Kiss the Bride" | Elton John and Dua Lipa | "Cold Heart (Pnau remix)" | |
| Elton John | "Sacrifice" | Elton John and Dua Lipa | "Cold Heart (Pnau remix)" | |
| Elton John | "Saturday Night's Alright for Fighting" | Umberto Tozzi | "Gloria" | |
| Elvis Presley | "Can't Help Falling in Love" | Spiritualized | "Ladies and Gentlemen We Are Floating in Space (Can't Help Falling in Love)" | |
| Eminem feat. Dina Rae | "Superman" | Drake and Giveon | "Chicago Freestyle" | |
| Faithless | "Insomnia" | Bebe Rexha and Faithless | "New Religion" | |
| French Montana | "Drink Freely" | Pop Smoke feat. Karol G | "Enjoy Yourself" | |
| Fugees | "Ready or Not" | 50 Cent | "High All the Time" | |
| Fugees | "Ready or Not" | Bridgit Mendler | "Ready or Not" | |
| George Gershwin | "Rhapsody in Blue" | Ben Folds Five | "Philosophy" | |
| George Gershwin | "Rhapsody in Blue" | Sleepy Kitty | "Speaking Politely" | |
| George Kranz | "Din Daa Daa" | Flo Rida | "Turn Around (5, 4, 3, 2, 1)" | |
| Georges Bizet | "Toreador Song" | The Living Tombstone | "Five Nights at Freddy's" | |
| Ginuwine | "Pony" | Rihanna | "Jump" | |
| Gloria Gaynor | "I Will Survive" | Ive | "After Like" | |
| Gloria Gaynor | "I Will Survive" | Miley Cyrus | "Flowers" | |
| Golden Sounds | "Zamina mina (Zangaléwa)" | Shakira feat. Freshlyground | "Waka Waka (This Time for Africa)" | |
| Gordon Jenkins | "Crescent City Blues" | Johnny Cash | "Folsom Prison Blues" | |
| Gotye feat. Kimbra | "Somebody That I Used to Know" | Justin Bieber | "Hold On" | |
| Guy | "Let's Chill" | Chris Brown | "WE (Warm Embrace)" | |
| Haddaway | "What Is Love" | David Guetta, Anne-Marie and Coi Leray | "Baby Don't Hurt Me" | |
| Harry Belafonte | "Day-O (The Banana Boat Song)" | Jason Derulo | "Don't Wanna Go Home" | |
| Hootie & the Blowfish | "Hold My Hand" | Scotty McCreery feat. Hootie & the Blowfish | "Bottle Rockets" | |
| INXS | "Need You Tonight" | Dua Lipa | "Break My Heart" | |
| Ismail Marzuki | "Rayuan Pulau Kelapa" | Project Pop | "Indovers" | |
| The Jackson 5 | "ABC" | Sigala | "Easy Love" | |
| Jacques Revaux | "Comme d'habitude" | Frank Sinatra | "My Way" | |
| Janet Jackson | "Together Again" | Fifty Fifty feat. Kaliii | "Barbie Dreams" | |
| J Boog | "Let's Do It Again" | Pia Mia feat. Chris Brown and Tyga | "Do It Again" | |
| Jean-Paul-Égide Martini | "Plaisir d'amour" | Elvis Presley | "Can't Help Falling in Love" | |
| Jeremiah Clarke | "Prince of Denmark's March" | The Beatles | "It's All Too Much" | |
| The McCoys | "Sorrow" | The Beatles | "It's All Too Much" | |
| Jimi Hendrix | "Third Stone from the Sun" | The Amboy Dukes | "Baby, Please Don't Go" | |
| Jimi Hendrix | "Third Stone from the Sun" | Cozy Powell | "Dance with the Devil" | |
| Jimi Hendrix | "Third Stone from the Sun" | Right Said Fred | "I'm Too Sexy" | |
| J. J. Fad | "Supersonic" | Fergie feat. will.i.am | "Fergalicious" | |
| J-Kwon | "Tipsy" | Shaboozey | "A Bar Song (Tipsy)" | |
| Jo Dee Messina | "Heads Carolina, Tails California" | Cole Swindell | "She Had Me at Heads Carolina" | |
| Johann Pachelbel | "Pachelbel's Canon" | Aphrodite's Child | "Rain and Tears" | |
| Johann Pachelbel | "Pachelbel's Canon" | Pop-Tops | "Oh Lord, Why Lord" | |
| Johann Pachelbel | "Pachelbel's Canon" | The Farm | "All Together Now" | |
| Johann Pachelbel | "Pachelbel's Canon" | Coolio feat. 40 Thevz | "C U When U Get There" | |
| Johann Pachelbel | "Pachelbel's Canon" | Trans-Siberian Orchestra | "Christmas Canon" | |
| Johann Pachelbel | "Pachelbel's Canon" | Procol Harum | "Sunday Morning" | |
| Johann Sebastian Bach | "Air on the G String" | Procol Harum | "A Whiter Shade of Pale" | |
| Johann Sebastian Bach | "Air on the G String" | Sweetbox | "Everything's Gonna Be Alright" | |
| Johannes Brahms | "Hungarian Dance No. 5" | Jamie T | "The Dance of the Young Professionals" | |
| Johnny Gill | "My, My, My" | Cashmere Cat feat. Ariana Grande | "Adore" | |
| Keith Whitley | "Miami, My Amy" | Morgan Wallen | "Miami" | |
| Kendrick Lamar | "Humble" | Eminem | "Greatest" | |
| Playboi Carti feat. Lil Uzi Vert | "Wokeuplikethis" | Eminem | "Greatest" | |
| Kenny Rogers feat. Dolly Parton | "Islands in the Stream" | Pras Michel feat. Ol' Dirty Bastard and Mýa | "Ghetto Supastar (That Is What You Are)" | |
| Kevin Lyttle | "Turn Me On" | Chris Brown | "Questions" | |
| LeAnn Rimes | "Can't Fight the Moonlight" | Ava Max | "Million Dollar Baby" | |
| Led Zeppelin | "Trampled Under Foot" | Franz Ferdinand (band) | "Take Me Out (song)" | |
| Led Zeppelin | "When the Levee Breaks" | U2 | "Bullet the Blue Sky" | |
| Leona Lewis | "Bleeding Love" | KAROL G & Tiësto | "CONTIGO" | |
| Little Anthony and the Imperials | "Shimmy, Shimmy, Ko-Ko-Bop" | Exo | "Ko Ko Bop" | |
| Little Anthony and the Imperials | "Shimmy, Shimmy, Ko-Ko-Bop" | Lana Del Rey | "A&W" | |
| Los Kjarkas | "Llorando se fue" | Jennifer Lopez feat. Pitbull | "On the Floor" | |
| Lucky Starr | "I've Been Everywhere" | Rihanna | "Where Have You Been" | |
| Ludwig van Beethoven | "Symphony No. 5" | Deep Purple | "Smoke on the Water" | |
| Ludwig van Beethoven | "Für Elise" | Saint Motel | "For Elise" | |
| Malcom McLaren | "Buffalo Gals" | Eminem | "Without Me" | |
| Manu Dibango | "Soul Makossa" | Michael Jackson | "Wanna Be Startin' Somethin'" | |
| Mariah Carey | "Always Be My Baby" | Sigala feat. Imani and DJ Fresh | "Say You Do" | |
| The Marvelettes | "Please, Mr. Postman" | Portugal. The Man | "Feel It Still" | |
| Marvin Gaye | "Sexual Healing" | Nelly feat. Jeremih | "The Fix" | |
| Mary J. Blige | "Real Love" | Frank Ocean feat. Earl Sweatshirt | "Super Rich Kids" | |
| Michael Jackson | "Wanna Be Startin' Somethin'" | Kanye West feat. Bon Iver | "Lost in the World" | |
| Modjo | "Lady (Hear Me Tonight)" | Kygo feat. Zak Abel and Nile Rodgers | "For Life" | |
| New Order | "Blue Monday" | Rihanna | "Shut Up and Drive" | |
| Nirvana | "In Bloom" | Lil Nas X | "Panini" | |
| Norman Greenbaum | "Spirit in the Sky" | ZZ Top | "La Grange (song)" | |
| Norman Greenbaum | "Spirit in the Sky" | Goldfrapp | "Ooh La La" | |
| The Notorious B.I.G. | "Kick in the Door" | Blackpink | "Pink Venom" | |
| Rihanna | "Pon de Replay" | Blackpink | "Pink Venom" | |
| The Notorious B.I.G. | "Gimme the Loot" | Ariana Grande | "7 Rings" | |
| Rodgers and Hammerstein | "My Favourite Things" | Ariana Grande | "7 Rings" | |
| NSYNC | "It Makes Me Ill" | Ariana Grande | "Break Up with Your Girlfriend, I'm Bored" | |
| Ol' Dirty Bastard | "Shimmy Shimmy Ya" | Jason Derulo feat. Nicki Minaj and Ty Dolla $ign | "Swalla" | |
| Oliver Cheatham | "Get Down Saturday Night" | Michael Gray feat. Shèna | "The Weekend" | |
| Olivia Newton-John | "Physical" | Dua Lipa | "Physical" | |
| Olivia Newton-John | "Physical" | Miley Cyrus feat. Dua Lipa | "Prisoner" | |
| Olivia Newton-John | "Physical" | Doja Cat feat. SZA | "Kiss Me More" | |
| Olivia Newton-John | "Physical" | Benson Boone | "Mystical Magical" | |
| Outkast | "Rosa Parks" | Chris Brown | "This Way" | |
| O-Zone | "Dragostea Din Tei" | Latino | "Festa no Apê" | |
| O-Zone | "Dragostea Din Tei" | David Guetta and OneRepublic | "I Don't Wanna Wait" | |
| Patrice Rushen | "Forget Me Nots" | George Michael | "Fastlove" | |
| Patrice Rushen | "Forget Me Nots" | Will Smith | "Men in Black" | |
| Percy Montross | "Oh My Darling, Clementine" | Cher Lloyd | "Swagger Jagger" | |
| Peter Schilling | "Major Tom (Coming Home)" | Ava Max | "Born to the Night" | |
| Plain White T's | "Hey There Delilah" | Rod Wave | "By Your Side" | |
| The Police | "Roxanne" | Sting and Swedish House Mafia | "Redlight" | |
| The Police | "Don't Stand So Close to Me" | Dire Straits | "Money for Nothing" | |
| Queen | "We Will Rock You" | Eminem | "'Till I Collapse" | |
| Queen | "We Will Rock You" | Katy Perry | "E.T." | |
| Queen | "We Will Rock You" | Beyoncé | "Dreaming" | |
| Queen | "We Will Rock You" | One Direction | "Rock Me" | |
| Queen | "We Will Rock You" | Kesha | "Gold Trans Am" | |
| Raspberries | "Let's Pretend" | Eric Carmen | "All by Myself" | |
| Sergei Rachmaninoff | "Piano Concerto No. 2" | Eric Carmen | "All by Myself" | |
| Red Rat | "Tight Up Skirt" | Chris Brown | "Privacy" | |
| Richard Jones | "Greensleeves" | William Chatterton Dix | "What Child Is This?" | |
| Richard Jones | "Greensleeves" | Ralph Vaughan Williams | "Alas, My Love, You Do Me Wrong" | |
| Richard Jones | "Greensleeves" | Gustav Holst | "Second Suite in F for Military Band" | |
| Richard Jones | "Greensleeves" | Jacques Brel | "Amsterdam" | |
| Rick Astley | "Never Gonna Give You Up" | Yung Gravy | "Betty (Get Money)" | |
| Right Said Fred | "I'm Too Sexy" | Sugababes | "Get Sexy" | |
| Right Said Fred | "I'm Too Sexy" | Taylor Swift | "Look What You Made Me Do" | |
| Right Said Fred | "I'm Too Sexy" | Beyoncé | "Alien Superstar" | |
| Rob Thomas | "Lonely No More" | Rixton | "Me and My Broken Heart" | |
| Robin S. | "Show Me Love" | Kid Ink feat. Chris Brown | "Show Me" | |
| Robin S. | "Show Me Love" | David Guetta and Showtek | "Your Love" | |
| Robyn | "Cobrastyle" | Charli XCX | "Speed Drive" | |
| Toni Basil | "Mickey" | Charli XCX | "Speed Drive" | |
| The Rockin' Berries | "Poor Man's Son" | Jamie T | "The Man's Machine" | |
| Salt-N-Pepa | "Let's Talk About Sex" | Cheat Codes and Kris Kross Amsterdam | "Sex" | |
| Sean Paul | "We Be Burnin'" | Tinashe feat. Schoolboy Q | "2 On" | |
| September | "Cry for You" | Charli XCX feat. Rina Sawayama | "Beg for You" | |
| The Sequence | "Funk You Up" | Dr. Dre | "Keep Their Heads Ringin'" | |
| Sergei Rachmaninoff | "Piano Concerto No. 2" | Buddy Kaye and Ted Mossman | "Full Moon and Empty Arms" | |
| Sergei Rachmaninoff | "Piano Concerto No. 2" | Frank Sinatra | "I Think of You" | |
| Sergei Rachmaninoff | "Symphony No. 2" | Eric Carmen | "Never Gonna Fall in Love Again" | |
| Shaggy feat. RikRok | "It Wasn't Me" | Liam Payne feat. Quavo | "Strip That Down" | |
| Shakira | "Whenever, Wherever" | Kygo and Ava Max | "Whatever" | |
| Simon & Garfunkel | "Cecilia" | The Vamps | "Oh Cecilia (Breaking My Heart)" | |
| Siouxsie and the Banshees | "Spellbound" | Lady Gaga | "Abracadabra" | |
| Sir Mix-a-Lot | "Swass" | Tori Alamaze | "Don't Cha" | |
| Sixpence None the Richer | "Kiss Me" | Lisa | "Moonlit Floor (Kiss Me)" | |
| Slick Rick | "La Di Da Di" | The Notorious B.I.G. | "Hypnotize" | |
| Snap! | "Rhythm Is a Dancer" | Jeremih feat. YG | "Don't Tell 'Em" | |
| The Staple Singers | "This May Be the Last Time" | The Rolling Stones | "The Last Time" | |
| Stardust | "Music Sounds Better with You" | Big Time Rush feat. Mann | "Music Sounds Better with U" | |
| Steve Miller Band | "Abracadabra" | Eminem | "Houdini" | |
| Stevie Wonder | "Pastime Paradise" | Coolio feat. L.V. | "Gangsta's Paradise" | |
| Sting | "Shape of My Heart" | Juice WRLD | "Lucid Dreams" | |
| The Sugarhill Gang | "Rapper's Delight" | Las Ketchup | "The Ketchup Song (Aserejé)" | |
| Supertramp | "The Logical Song" | David Guetta and Kim Petras | "When We Were Young (The Logical Song)" | |
| Suzanne Vega | "Tom's Diner" | Fall Out Boy | "Centuries" | |
| Suzanne Vega | "Tom's Diner" | Cupcakke | "Dora" | |
| Suzanne Vega | "Tom's Diner" | Nardo Wick | "Dah Dah DahDah" | |
| Suzanne Vega | "Tom's Diner" | IVE | "Attitude" | |
| Taylor Swift | "New Year's Day" | Olivia Rodrigo | "1 Step Forward, 3 Steps Back" | |
| Taylor Swift | "Cruel Summer" | Olivia Rodrigo | "Deja Vu" | |
| Teena Marie | "Ooo La La La" | Fugees | "Fu-Gee-La" | |
| Teena Marie | "Ooo La La La" | Beyoncé | "Cuff It" | |
| This Mortal Coil | "Kangaroo" | Jamie T | "90s Cars" | |
| TLC | "No Scrubs" | Ed Sheeran | "Shape of You" | |
| TLC | "No Scrubs" | Avicii feat. Aloe Blacc | "SOS" | |
| Toby Keith | "As Good as I Once Was" | Riley Green | "Think As You Drunk" | |
| Tom Browne | "Funkin' for Jamaica (N.Y.)" | Da Click | "We Are Da Click" | |
| Tom Green | "Lonely Swedish (The Bum Bum Song)" | Eminem | "The Real Slim Shady" | |
| Tom Petty and The Heartbreakers | "American Girl" | The Strokes | "Last Nite" | |
| Toni Basil | "Mickey" | Run-DMC | "It's Tricky" | |
| Toni Basil | "Mickey" | Rosé and Bruno Mars | "Apt." | |
| Trillville feat. Cutty | "Some Cut" | Doechii feat. Kodak Black | "What It Is (Block Boy)" | |
| Trinidad James | "All Gold Everything" | Mark Ronson feat. Bruno Mars | "Uptown Funk" | |
| Tupac Shakur feat. Dr. Dre and Roger Troutman | "California Love (Remix)" | Chris Brown feat. Jhené Aiko and R. Kelly | "Juicy Booty" | |
| Usher | "Nice & Slow" | Chris Brown | "To My Bed" | |
| War | "Smile Happy" | Shaggy feat. RikRok | "It Wasn't Me" | |
| Whitney Houston | "How Will I Know" | LMC vs U2 | "Take Me to the Clouds Above" | |
| Whitney Houston | "How Will I Know" | David Guetta, MistaJam and John Newman | "If You Really Love Me (How Will I Know)" | |
| Whitney Houston | "I Wanna Dance with Somebody (Who Loves Me)" | Joe Iconis | "Michael in the Bathroom" | |
| Whitney Houston | "My Love Is Your Love" | Duke Dumont feat. Jax Jones | "I Got U" | |
| Wingy Manone | "Tar Paper Stomp" | Horace Henderson | "Hot and Anxious" | |
| Wingy Manone | "Tar Paper Stomp" | Joe Garland | "In the Mood" | |
| Wolfgang Amadeus Mozart | "Twelve Variations on "Ah vous dirai-je, Maman"" | N/A | "Baa, Baa, Black Sheep" | |
| Wolfgang Amadeus Mozart | "Twelve Variations on "Ah vous dirai-je, Maman"" | N/A | "Twinkle, Twinkle, Little Star" | |
| Wolfgang Amadeus Mozart | "Twelve Variations on "Ah vous dirai-je, Maman"" | N/A | "The ABC Song" | |
| Wolfgang Amadeus Mozart | "Twelve Variations on "Ah vous dirai-je, Maman"" | Gotye feat. Kimbra | "Somebody That I Used to Know" | |
| Yazoo | "Don't Go" | Kid Sister | "Big N Bad" | |
| Young M.A. | "Ooouuu" | Eminem | "The Ringer" | |

== See also ==
- Interpolation (popular music)
- List of the most sampled drum breaks
