= The Man's Machine =

2009 Jamie T extended play album

EP by Jamie T
- Released: 23 November 2009
- Recorded: 2008–2009
- Genre: Indie rock, ska, post-punk
- Length: 14:13
- Label: Virgin Records
- Producer: Jamie T, Ben Bones

Jamie T chronology
Kings & Queens (2009)	The Man's Machine (2009)	Carry On the Grudge (2014)

The Man's Machine is an extended play (EP) released by English singer-songwriter Jamie T on 23 November 2009. It was Jamie T's third EP release of 2009, following his critically acclaimed Sticks 'n' Stones EP in June and Chaka Demus EP in August. The titular song is also the fourth track on his Kings & Queens album, whose release preceded this EP in September—thus rendering it his fourth release of the year overall.

== Background ==
The Man's Machine is the third EP—with the title track as the third single off Jamie T's critically acclaimed second LP, Kings & Queens—albeit the first one to be released after the album. The EP/single version of "The Man's Machine" varies from the album cut, having removed the intro featuring the Angelic Upstarts' spoken word segment that was interpolated over The Rockin' Berries' cover of "Poor Man's Son" (originally recorded by The Reflections).

Like Sticks 'n' Stones and Chaka Demus before it, The Man's Machine EP album contains three new B-sides: "Jenny Can Rely on Me", "Man Not a Monster", and "Believing in Things That Can't Be Done". When AOL's Spinner inquired about why he was "squandering all of these songs" on EPs, Jamie T replied that usually, "…all they usually get is shit B-sides and remixes, you know? … The point of releasing an EP is to give people more music."

"Man Not a Monster" became a minor sleeper hit. It was selected by BBC Radio 1 DJ Zane Lowe as the "Hottest Record in the World" of 21 October 2009. The song also ranked #3 on NME's "10 Tracks You Have to Hear This Week", for the week of 6 November 2009.

== Music video ==
The music video for the title track was released on 28 October 2009, and was directed by Adam Powell—who had previously directed Jamie T's 2009 promo single music video, "Fire Fire". It was filmed with a DVCPro-HD camera, with his and Jamie's collaborative concept to capture footage that was "saturated in the culture it came from" which would reflect the lyrics. Powell cites the Beastie Boys as a major component of inspiration.

== Critical response ==
The Man's Machine EP received primarily favorable reviews from critics. Tim Dickinson from The Blue Walrus lauded the production value on the title track, particularly the chorus. He also noted the "broad range of styles", such as the ska-punk rhythms of "Man Not a Monster"; and the more introspective balladeer side, as displayed on "Believing in Things That Can't Be Done".

Reviewing for University of Oxford's Cherwell student newspaper, Hannah Partos also praised the EP for retaining its anarchic swagger as Jamie T blends raucous "ska beats and soulful vocals". Partos particularly set aside compliments for "Jenny Can Rely on Me", describing it as "Jamie at his best" with "little vignettes of everyday life", comparing him to Billy Bragg. She was less enthusiastic about "Man Not a Monster", finding the lyrics hollow compared to past "typical gems". But she felt the last track was an anthem, and that overall "his trajectory" is developing towards becoming "a national treasure".

== Track listing ==
All lyrics are written by Jamie Alexander Treays, unless otherwise indicated..

The Man's Machine track listing
No.	Title	Writer(s)	Producer(s)	Length
1.	"The Man's Machine" (single edit^{[a]})	Jamie Treays; Ben "Bones" Coupland /; Tony Fisher • Emmett Nixon • Robert Reed • Taylor Reed^{[b]}	Jamie T; Ben Bones; Stephen Street^{[c]}^{[d]}	3:39
2.	"Jenny Can Rely on Me"	Treays; Coupland	Jamie T; Bones	3:33
3.	"Man Not a Monster"	Treays; Matt Jones^{[e]}	Jamie T; Bones; Jason Cox^{[c]}	2:58
4.	"Believing in Things That Can't Be Done"	Treays; Coupland	Jamie T; Bones	4:03
Total length:				14:13

Notes:

- ^{^[a]} This rendition of "The Man's Machine" differs from the album's version, as it omits the intro—both the spoken word sampling from the Angelic Upstarts' 1981 Live album and the underlying interpolation of "Poor Man's Son", as covered by The Rockin' Berries.
- ^{^[b]} Samples from several songs utilized throughout "The Man's Machine" include: "Police Oppression" by Angelic Upstarts; "The Trouser Press" by Bonzo Dog Doo-Dah Band; "Watch Yourself" by Nine Below Zero; and "Pump Me Up" by Trouble Funk. Only the latter received songwriting credits.
- ^{^[c]} Indicates an additional producer on the track.
- ^{^[d]} Additional personnel include Drew McConnell on bass guitar and Cenzo Townshend as mixing engineer.
- ^{^[e]} Jones also played keyboards on "Man Not a Monster".

== Chart history ==
The Man's Machine EP spent eight cumulative weeks in the top 100 of physical single sales between 05 December 2009 and 13 February 2010, peaking at #18 upon entry with the first six being consecutive weeks on the charts.
