= Hampton Wick =

Coordinates: 51.415°N 0.310°W

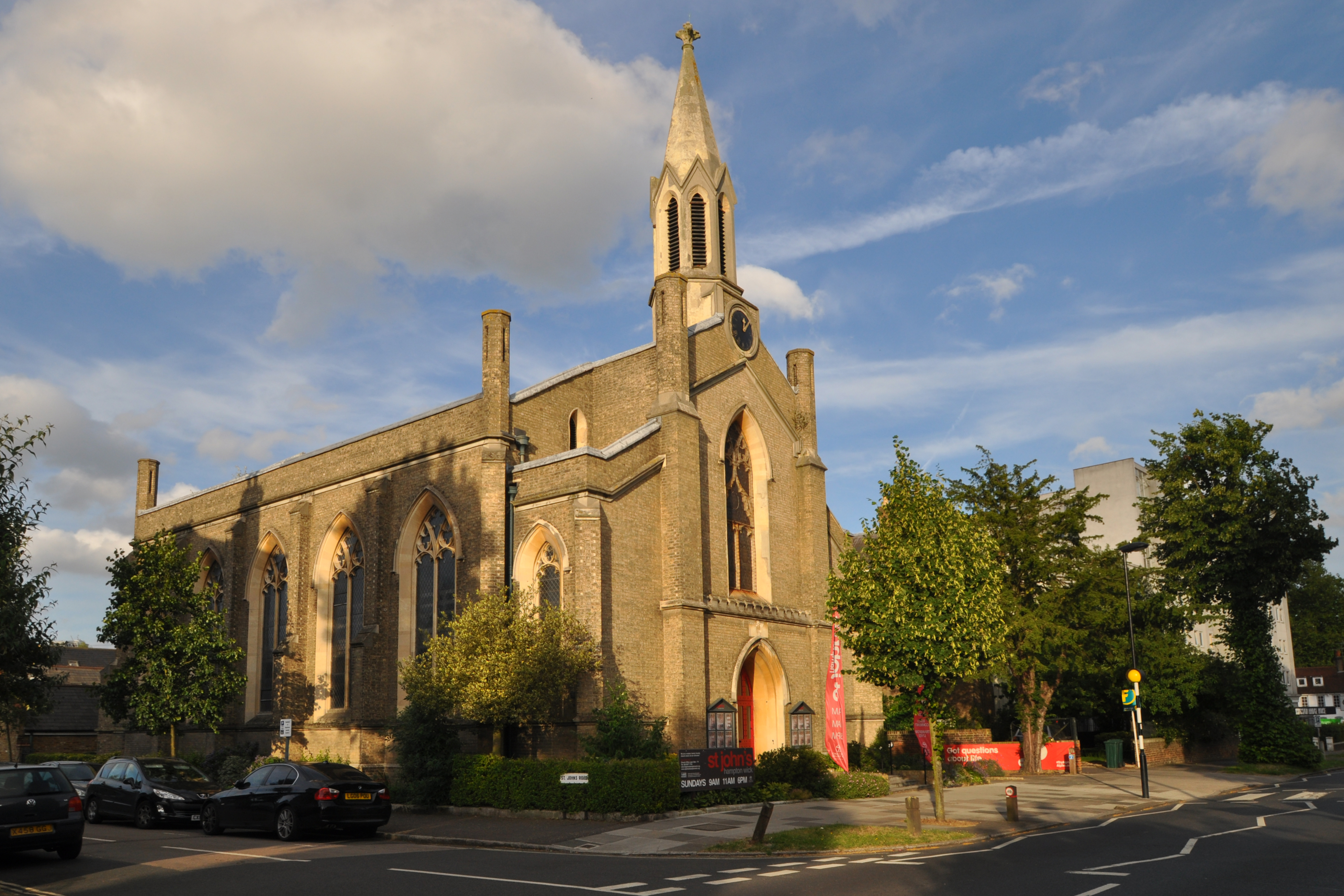
- Locally born architect Edward Lapidge both designed and donated the land for a church, St John's Hampton Wick, built in 1831

- Location within Greater London
- Area: 2.74 km^{2} (1.06 sq mi)
- Population: 10,221 (2011 census)
  - Density: 3,730/km^{2} (9,700/sq mi)
- OS grid reference: TQ1769
- London borough: Richmond
- Ceremonial county: Greater London
- Region: London
- Country: England
- Sovereign state: United Kingdom
- Post town: KINGSTON UPON THAMES
- Postcode district: KT1
- Dialling code: 020
- Police: Metropolitan
- Fire: London
- Ambulance: London
- UK Parliament: Twickenham
- London Assembly: South West

Hampton Wick is a Thamesside area of the London Borough of Richmond upon Thames, England, contiguous with Teddington, Kingston upon Thames and Bushy Park.

Market gardening continued until well into the twentieth century. With its road and rail connections to London along the M4 corridor, it is within the London commuter belt.

Although north of the River Thames, the area forms part of the Kingston upon Thames and East Molesey post towns based on the south side of the river. As the river flows north past Hampton Wick and Kingston, it is actually west of Kingston.

== History ==
There is evidence of Roman occupation. Kingston Bridge, the first bridge linking the village with Kingston upon Thames is dated from about 1219 and replaced the Roman ford at this point.

Cardinal Wolsey is believed to have lived in Hampton Wick (in Lower Teddington Road) while waiting for Hampton Court Palace to be built. The parish of Hampton was split in the century after this time to form Hampton Wick.

Sir Richard Steele also lived in Hampton Wick, in a house he whimsically called "The Hovel". He dedicated the fourth volume of Tatler to Charles, Lord Halifax "from the Hovel at Hampton Wick, April 7, 1711", around the time he became Surveyor of the Royal Stables at Hampton Court Palace, Governor of the King's Comedians, a justice of the peace and a knight.

The Hampton Wick Local Board was established in 1863 with headquarters at the "idiosyncratic, tall, Dutch gabled" Hampton Wick Local Board Office located at 45A High Street. It was built in 1884 by local architect Richard T. Elsam in an "exuberant" Jacobean style. The building presently serves as private housing.

Reverend Frederick Champion de Crespigny was a vicar of Hampton Wick who was also involved in many secular affairs, most notably at the Local Board where he was clerk. An excellent cricketer, he founded and presided the Hampton Wick Royal Cricket Club in Bushy Park in 1863. De Crespigny resided at a now demolished Gothic Revival Vicarage formerly located on Park Road, directly across from the Hampton Wick entrance to Bushy Park at Cobbler's Walk.

The architect Edward Lapidge both designed and donated the land for a church, St John's Hampton Wick, built in 1831. Lapidge had been born in the village. He also designed the present Kingston Bridge. In 2010, after five years of closure, the church re-opened its doors under the Church of England's church planting scheme. Services were resumed in December 2010.

== Governance ==
Hampton Wick is part of the Twickenham constituency for elections to the House of Commons of the United Kingdom.

Hampton Wick is part of the Hampton Wick and South Teddington ward for elections to Richmond upon Thames London Borough Council.

On 1 April 1937 the civil parish was abolished and merged with Twickenham. At the 1931 census (the last before the abolition of the parish), Hampton Wick had a population of 2960.

== Hampton Wick in popular culture ==
A tone poem Hampton Wick for orchestra was composed by Harry Waldo Warner and won the Hollywood Bowl Competition in 1932, then was premiered by Cincinnati Symphony Orchestra in 1934. The music was based on a poem by Onslow Frampton which was the pen name of Warner himself.

In Cockney rhyming slang, "Hampton Wick" (often shortened to "Hampton") means "dick" or "prick", both of which are British vulgar slang names for the penis. Hence a character called Hugh Jampton (a Cockney homophone of "huge Hampton") in the 1950s BBC radio programme The Goon Show. Another use of the term appeared in the 2000s BBC TV series The Office when Tim Canterbury bemoans the quality of Slough's nightlife, recollecting a Tudor-themed club memorably displaying a punning notice stating "Don't get your Hampton Court" in the men's toilets. The title of rocker Sammy Hagar's 1982 album Standing Hampton also relates to the same piece of rhyming slang. Ian Dury used the name, and the phrase "Hamptons don't leave fingerprints", in the song "Blackmail Man" on his 1977 album New Boots and Panties!!

Hampton Wick was the setting for the 1970s Thames Television situation comedy George and Mildred. The area is near the former Thames studios at Teddington and filming took place at Manor Road in Teddington. Hampton Wick was also the title of The Two Ronnies' first "classic serial" spoof drama in their first BBC series (1973). Hampton Wick is referenced by British singer-songwriter Jamie T in the title track of his 2009 EP Sticks 'n' Stones. The Two Ronnies also use the word to comic effect in their 1971 sketch "The Ministry of Pollution" where the Minister of Pollution (Barker) says, "North and Southampton will be joined together into one enormous hampton".

Hampton Wick (Station) also featured in the sitcom The Fall and Rise of Reginald Perrin as the first of his train-based excuses for arriving late for work: "Eleven minutes late, staff difficulties, Hampton Wick."

== Sport and leisure ==
Hampton Wick Royal Cricket Club, founded in 1863, is a cricket club at the Royal Cricket Grand Pavilion in Bushy Park. The team currently plays in division three of the Surrey Championship League. The club's first eleven finished the 2006 season as unbeaten champions of the Fullers League Division 2 1st-XI league and gained promotion to Division 1.

The Royal Paddocks Allotments are adjacent to Bushy Park and Hampton Wick Royal Cricket Club. They were established following a lease made by King George V in 1921.

== Demography and housing ==
Output area	Detached	Semi-detached	Terraced	Flats and apartments	Caravans/temporary/mobile homes	Shared between households
(ward)	520	797	813	2,256	21	48

2011 Census households
Output area	Population	Households	% Owned outright	% Owned with a loan	hectares
(ward)	10,221	3,918	30	32	274

== Economy and transport ==
The main economic features here are transport. Kingston University has a large hall of residence in the town. Some professional offices are by Kingston Bridge and these include a major office of HSBC bank. The A308 splits the Royal Parks, leading nearby to the A309 and A312 roads, north–south. Equally, the A311 passes through the heart of the district forming its short, convenience High Street and provider further connections than another B road by the park to the larger commercial centre of Teddington, centred less than 1 mile (1.6 km) from Hampton Wick's railway station which is another economic hub of the area.

Hampton Wick railway station has connections to London Waterloo.

== See also ==
- Hampton Wick War Memorial
