= Bastards of Young =

1985 song by The Replacements

Song by The Replacements

from the album Tim
- Published: 1985
- Genre: Punk rock; garage rock; college rock
- Length: 3:35
- Label: Sire
- Songwriter: Paul Westerberg
- Producer: Tommy Ramone

"Bastards of Young" is a song written by Paul Westerberg and recorded by his band The Replacements for their fourth studio album Tim (1985). Inspired by Westerberg's sister Mary and the band's feelings of alienation, the song has been described as an "anthem" and features a Who-inspired guitar intro.

Though not released as a single, the song's minimalist music video, which pointed a camera at a speaker throughout, gained notoriety. The song was performed on Saturday Night Live, where Westerberg's use of profanity in an off-mike comment earned the ire of producer Lorne Michaels. Since its release, the song has received critical acclaim and has been named by many music writers as one of the band's greatest songs. In 2021, the song was ranked by magazine Consequence of Sound as one of the 50 best punk rock songs of all time.

== Background ==
"Bastards of Young" was written by Replacements frontman Paul Westerberg, who labored over the song's lyrics over multiple drafts. The song's topic of alienation was inspired in part by Westerberg's sister Mary, who left their hometown of Minneapolis to search for acting roles in New York City. Westerberg commented, "To me, a part of that song is about my sister who felt the need ... to be something by going somewhere else. It is sort of the Replacements feeling the same way ... not knowing where we fit. It's our way of reaching a hand out and saying, 'We are right along with you. We are just as confused.'"

The lyric "Income tax deduction, one hell of a function" alluded to two things: Westerberg's worry that the band was only being used as a write off by their label, and the fact that Westerberg's mother induced his birth early on New Year's Eve to get a tax break. The chorus lyric "Wait on the sons of no one" was often misconstrued as "We are the sons of no one"; Westerberg himself admitted to forgetting the true lyric until author Bob Mehr pointed this out. Westerberg further commented that the line was taken from the Bible.

The minimalist guitar opening of "Bastards of Young," like the intros of many Replacements songs from the period, was based on early Who records that Westerberg admired. The song's coda features Westerberg repeating "Take it, it's yours" over drummer Chris Mars' repeated drum fills.

== Release ==
"Bastards of Young" was released on the band's major-label debut and fourth studio album Tim in 1985. It has also appeared on compilation albums, such as Don't You Know Who I Think I Was?, as well as live albums like For Sale: Live at Maxwell's 1986.

Though not released as a single, a music video for the song was produced and saw moderate success on MTV's 120 Minutes, which promoted alternative music. Directed by Randy Skinner and based on a concept by Jeff Ayeroff, the video points the camera at a speaker in Skinner's apartment and slowly zooms out, revealing a listener smoking a cigarette. The listener then kicks the speaker at the end of the song and walks away. A dog walking around in the background cost $500 a day, making it, according to Skinner, the most expensive part of the video's $10,000 budget.

== Live performances ==
"Bastards of Young" became a live favorite of the band and was performed as one of the band's two songs played on Saturday Night Live (the other being "Kiss Me on the Bus"). Against the wishes of SNL, the band cranked their amps and Westerberg shouted "Come on, fucker" to guitarist Bob Stinson. Producer Lorne Michaels was livid, as Replacements co-manager Russ Rieger recalled: "An assistant told me, 'Lorne Michaels wants to see you in the hall. I'm thinking he wants to congratulate us. [Instead, he yelled] 'How dare you do this? Do you know what you just did to this show? Your band will never perform on television again!' Finally, I figured out that Paul had said 'fuck' on the air. I immediately started apologizing. Michaels wouldn't hear of it. Since we were a new band and young, and a favor for Warner Bros., he could unleash. And he did."

== Critical reception ==
"Bastards of Young" received positive reviews from music critics. AllMusic's Jason Ankeny wrote of the song, "With 'Bastards of Young,' the Replacements' Paul Westerberg finally delivered the rock & roll anthem he'd always threatened -- a rallying cry for a generation of misfits and ne'er-do-wells raised on false hopes and dim aspirations." Pitchfork called the song an "anthem, no doubt about it," while Michael Keefe of PopMatters lauded the song as "a bluesy rocker the Rolling Stones would've been proud to have birthed."

The song has been ranked by many music writers as one of the best Replacements songs. Diffuser.fm ranked the song as the Replacements' best song, writing, "It's a defiant, and definite, statement from one of rock's greatest singer-songwriters of the past 30 years." Ultimate Classic Rock and PopMatters both ranked it as their fourth best song, with the latter writing, "this could retroactively be described as one of the first real Generation X anthems." Louder ranked it as their fourth best, proclaiming, "There is no greater fucking youth anthem than 'Bastards of Young'", while The Guardian ranked it fifth.

== Cover versions ==
English singer-songwriter Jamie T recorded an acoustic arrangement (with a slower tempo) on his EP, Magnolia Melancholia (2015).
