= Magnolia Melancholia =

2015 Jamie T extended play album

EP by Jamie T
- Released: 6 April 2015 (UK); 7 April 2015 (USA)
- Recorded: 2010–2014
- Genres: Indie rock; alternative folk
- Length: 21:27
- Labels: EMI; Virgin; Epitaph
- Producers: Jamie T, James Dring

Jamie T chronology
Carry On the Grudge (2014)	Magnolia Melancholia (2015)	Trick (2016)

Singles from Magnolia Melancholia
- 1. "Don't You Find" Released: 10 April 2015

Professional ratings
Review scores
Source	Rating
Contactmusic.com	4/5 red-stars
Drowned in Sound	7/10 teal-dots
Gigslutz	4/5 stars
The Line of Best Fit	8/10 stars
Live in Limbo	8/10 stars
NME	4/5 red-stars

Magnolia Melancholia is an extended play (EP) released by English singer-songwriter Jamie T on 6 April 2015 in the UK, and on the 7th in the USA. It was the follow-up release to his third album, Carry On the Grudge (2014), his first release after a five-year hiatus. It includes five new songs (two of which are covers) and one song from the third album, "Don't You Find", which was re-released to once again serve as the lead single.

== Background ==
When Carry On the Grudge was released in 2014, "Don't You Find" was released as the first single. However, it failed to chart in any significant way, and was overshadowed by the second single, "Zombie", which became a Top 40 hit. While its third single, "Rabbit Hole", was minorly successful in downloads and physical sales in early 2015, Magnolia Melancholia was released in the spring of 2015, with "Don't You Find" re-released as its lead single. This time, however, it was able to chart, albeit briefly for only one week at No. 87 on the Official Sales/Downloads Charts.

Jamie T also opted to cover two songs on this EP: "Bastards of Young" (originally by American alternative rock band The Replacements) and "Mama Don't Smoke" (originally by Canadian musical collective Bran Van 3000). The latter was written by Eric Grauer and collective member Sara Johnston; the former was written by lead singer/guitarist, Paul Westerberg.

The other three tracks are new original songs: pseudo-hymnal "Riverbed"; "Marilyn Monroe" (referencing the titular American blonde bombshell/film actress, Marilyn Monroe, among others in its lyrics); and its title track, "Magnolia Melancholia". All are written solely by Treays, who stated in an interview with The Observer that he had written upwards of 180 songs during his five-year hiatus.

== Music video ==
"Don't You Find" originally released an accompanying music video the year prior, when the song premiered on the third album, Carry On the Grudge (2014). The video acquired over 1 million views. It was re-released along with the single.

== Critical response ==
The reviews from critics were fairly positive. Sofie Mikhaylova of Live in Limbo states that "[his] songwriting skills are beyond compare". George Meixner of The Line of Best Fit notes that Jamie's songs are more sullen and solitary, yet tender and heartfelt as a result.

Joe Goggins from Drowned in Sound celebrated the re-release of the lead single; and also raved about the title track, calling it "a delight, with a stroppily-delivered vocal battling a chirpy, erratic guitar line for prominence". Jamie Firby from Hit the Floor concurred, writing that the song "Magnolia Melancholia" took the EP "from something brilliant into something sensational". He added that Jamie T's "slow-raps and slurred vocals" within the song were the closest return to form amongst the past two albums. Harry Moore from Contactmusic.com complimented multiple tracks such as "Marilyn Monroe", which he called "an electrifying song" that ought to remind us "why we fell in love with Jamie T".

Writing for Popped Music, Gary Feeney praised the previously released "Don't You Find", stating it "combines a light reggae feel with haunting synth burts and backing vocals complimenting its wistful lyrics". Ben Homewood of NME wrote that "the brilliant "Riverbed" evolves from folky strum to Britpop chugger". James Cummins from Gigslutz lauded the cover of The Replacements' "Bastards of Young", calling it "hauntingly brilliant…as if it were his own". And writing for Beat, Chris Bright said the Bran Van 3000 cover of "Mama Don't Smoke" had an audibly "intimate bar charm" to it.

Not all responses were enthusiastic. Writing for Renowned for Sound, Andja Curcić stated that the EP was "a good mix of tracks", but none of which are equal to its lead single, "Don't You Find". Likewise, despite an above average score of 7/10, Josh Shreeve of It's All Indie remarked that Treays had "become a frustrated man", as evident from his lyrics in "Magnolia Melancholia", which he dubbed a "lethargic heartbreak ballad"; and "Riverbed", which was "an Albarn-esque self-reflection which chugs along woefully". Callum McCormack of The Indiependent, however, suggested even if not his greatest, it nevertheless reaffirms "Jamie T is the best solo artist at the moment".

== Track listing ==
All lyrics are written by Jamie Alexander Treays, unless otherwise indicated.

Magnolia Melancholia track listing^{[a]}
No.	Title	Writer(s)	Producer(s)	Length
1.	"Don't You Find"	Jamie Treays; Ben "Bones" Coupland	Jamie T; Ben Bones; James Dring^{[b]}	4:15
2.	"Marilyn Monroe"	Treays	Jamie T; Dring	3:16
3.	"Mama Don't Smoke"	Eric Grauer; Sara Johnston^{[c]}	Jamie T	1:45
4.	"Magnolia Melancholia"	Treays	Jamie T	4:20
5.	"Riverbed"	Treays	Jamie T; Dring	3:25
6.	"Bastards of Young"	Paul Westerberg^{[d]}	Jamie T	4:26
Total length:				21:27

Notes:

- ^{^[a]} The album was dedicated to Robb Skipper, who died of a heroin overdose in 2014. He played the violin on "Riverbed".
- ^{^[b]} "Don't You Find" first appeared on Jamie's third album, Carry On the Grudge (2014). This is the same rendition.
- ^{^[c]} Cover of "Mama Don't Smoke" by Bran Van 3000, written by group member Sara Johnston with Eric Grauer.
- ^{^[d]} Cover of "Bastards of Young" by The Replacements, written by frontman Paul Westerberg.

== Personnel ==
- Jamie T – guitar (2–6); bass guitar (3); audio engineer (4,6); mixing engineer (3)
- James Dring – mixing engineer (tracks 1–6); drums (1–2,5); guitar (2,5); keyboards (1)
- Guy Davie – mastering engineer (tracks 1–6)
- Ben Bones – audio engineer (track 1); drums (1)
- Robb Skipper – violin (track 5)^{[a]}
- Andrew Murabito – cover art
- Sonny McCartney – photography
