= Solomon Eccles =

English composer and Quaker

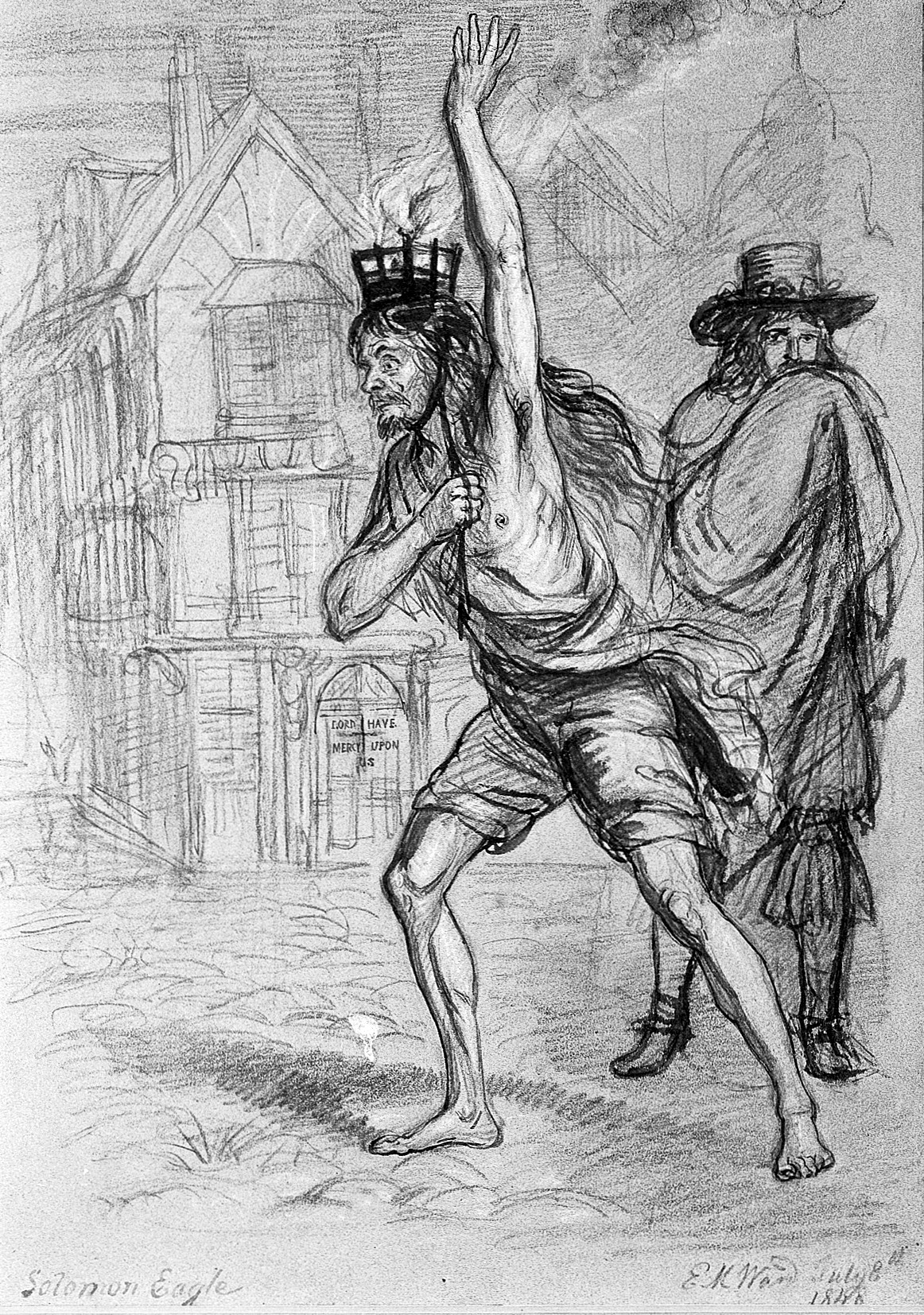
Solomon Eagle striding through plague ridden London with burning coals on his head, trying to fumigate the air. Chalk drawing by Edward Matthew Ward, 1848

Solomon Eccles (1618–1683), also known as Solomon Eagle, was an English composer. However, he later became an active Quaker and distanced himself from church music.

== Life ==
Solomon Eagle was mentioned in Daniel Defoe's semi-fictional account of the plague of 1665 titled A Journal of the Plague Year:

I suppose the world has heard of the famous Solomon Eagle, an enthusiast. He, though not infected at all but in his head, went about denouncing of judgment upon the city in a frightful manner, sometimes quite naked, and with a pan of burning charcoal on his head. What he said, or pretended, indeed I could not learn.

This event is corroborated in the 29 July 1667 entry of the Diary of Samuel Pepys (vol 13). Pepys confirms that the person described as such is a Quaker:

... a man, a Quaker, came naked through the [Westminster] Hall, only very civilly tied about the privates to avoid scandal, and with a chafing-dish of fire and brimstone burning upon his head ... crying, "Repent! repent!"

Eccles as a Quaker was prosecuted numerous times during the Restoration for civil disobedience. He would worship with other Quakers, although the Conventicle Act 1664 declared that this was a dangerous and seditious activity. The statute defined it as a criminal offence if more than five persons, "over and besides those of the same household, if it be in a house where there is a family inhabiting, or if it be in a house, field or place where there is no family inhabiting" assembled together "under colour or pretence of any exercise of religion, in other manner than according to the liturgy and practice of the Church of England." In May 1665, Eccles was arrested in Southwark, though he probably lived in the middle of the City of London, and was put away in prison for two or three months – probably in the Clink on the South Bank.

== Death and will ==
Eccles died on 2 January 1682 in Spitalfields. He made George Whitehead his executor, and left money to the Quakers Leonard Fell and James Lancaster.

== Works ==
Few if any of his works are extant, for when he became a Quaker, he burned all his books and compositions so as to distance himself from church music. He believed that music was a sinful vanity, and initially sold his compositions and instruments, before taking them back and burning them to prevent the purchaser falling into sin. His repugnance for the organised church was reflected in the Quaker name for church buildings in his time: "steeple-houses".

Eccles is credited as the author of a tract, "A Musick-Lector", from 1667.

== Family ==
Eccles had at least two children, who were also composers: John and Henry.

== Cultural references ==
Eccles, under the name Eagle, features as a major character in Harrison Ainsworth's novel Old St. Paul's, a fictional chronicle of the Great Plague and the Fire of London.

He is mentioned in the poem The Wilderness by Second World War British poet Sidney Keyes.

A song on Jamie T's 2016 album Trick is named after Solomon Eccles. The cover of the record shows an 1843 painting by Paul Falconer Poole depicting the scene reported above.

The British band Orange Goblin mention Solomon Eccles in their song "The Ballad of Solomon Eagle", and Jamie T's "Solomon Eagle" includes a reading of the A Journal of the Plague Year entry.
