= The Tra La La Song (One Banana, Two Banana) =

1968 pop song

"The Tra La La Song (One Banana, Two Banana)" is a 1968 pop song, which was the theme song for the children's television program The Banana Splits Adventure Hour. Originally released by Decca Records on the album titled We're the Banana Splits, the single release peaked at No. 96 on the Billboard Hot 100 on February 8, 1969, and No. 94 in Canada, on January 20, 1969. The writing of the song is credited to Mark Barkan and Ritchie Adams, who were the show's music directors.

However, there are claims that the theme was written by jingle writer N. B. Winkless Jr. of the Leo Burnett Agency, but was credited to Adams and Barkan for contractual reasons. This was confirmed by Winkless’s son Terence, who played Bingo on the show, in his 2020 memoir From the Inside: My Life As Bingo of the Banana Splits. "In no uncertain terms, the Tra-La-La song was written by my dad on the slightly out of tune upright piano in our living room in Kenilworth, Illinois."

In 1995, Hollywood Library released the 1,000-copy limited-edition CD reissue We're the Banana Splits/Here Come the Beagles which, in addition to the original album version, included an alternative version of the song.

== Cover versions ==
American punk rock band The Dickies made the song a hit in the United Kingdom in 1979 with their cover version, marketed by A&M Records as "Banana Splits (Tra La La Song)". The record reached No. 7 in the UK Singles Chart.

A version by Liz Phair with Material Issue was the first track included on the 1995 album Saturday Morning: Cartoons' Greatest Hits, which peaked at 67 on the Billboard 200.

English singer-songwriter Jamie T utilized the theme song by interpolating it with the melodic hook of his single "Chaka Demus", from his 2009 second album Kings & Queens.

American rock band Fall Out Boy made a cover version for the 2019 comedy horror adaptation The Banana Splits Movie in the end credits.
