= Hampton Wick Local Board Office =

Grade II listed building in the London Borough of Richmond upon Thames

Coordinates: 51.4131°N 0.3115°W

Former Hampton Wick Local Board Office
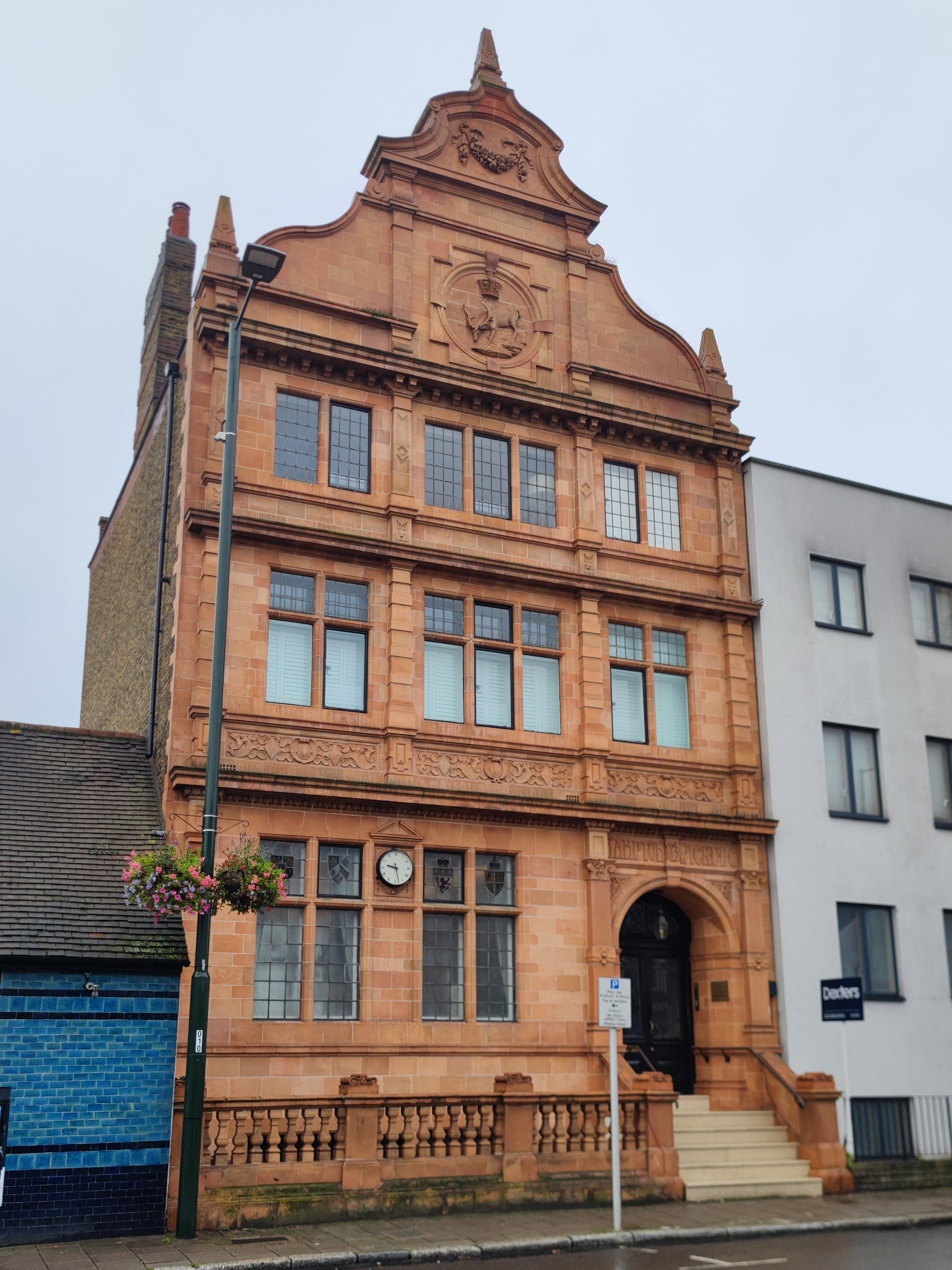
- The former Hampton Wick Local Board Office
- Interactive map of the Former Hampton Wick Local Board Office area

General information
- Type: Residential
- Architectural style: Jacobean
- Location: 45A High Street, Hampton Wick, London Borough of Richmond upon Thames, England
- Completed: 1884

Technical details
- Structural system: Terracotta
- Floor count: 3

Design and construction
- Architect: Richard T. Elsam

Listed Building – Grade II
- Official name: Former Hampton Wick Local Board offices and UDC office
- Designated: 22 February 2013
- Reference no.: 1412912

The Former Hampton Wick Local Board Office, also known as The Old Library or 45A High Street, is the former office of the Local Board and, later, of the Urban District Council of Hampton Wick in the London Borough of Richmond upon Thames. It is a Grade II listed building which currently serves as private housing.

== History ==
The Hampton Wick Local Board was established in 1863, the year inscribed on the building. The erection of the local board office ensued in 1884 under the care of local architect Richard T. Elsam.

The Local Board was supplanted by an Urban District Council in 1894, which was absorbed by the Municipal Borough of Twickenham in 1937. The building was later converted into a public library and, in the 1960s, received two apartments. By late 1970, the library was transferred over to a new building on Bennet Close, and the building was converted back into an office.

In 2013, the building gained a Historic England Grade II listing after a "passionate local campaign". It was converted into an apartment building with 4 units in 2016.

== Architecture ==
The building was designed by Richard T. Elsam in 1884 in the Jacobean style. The façade is clad in terracotta and the roof is made of slate tiles.

A sweep of new concrete steps leads to the entrance located within a semicircular arch. The arch springs from imposts within a pair of Composite pilasters with grotesques sculpted onto the capitals. The capitals support a broken architrave which reads "HAMPTON WICK U.D.C.", and the break above the keystone reads "1863", commemorating the establishment of the Hampton Wick Local Board.

The façade is topped with a Dutch gable with obelisks on either side. The gable features a roundel with a stag and crown, the seal of the local board designed by Sir Thomas James Nelson.

== Gallery ==
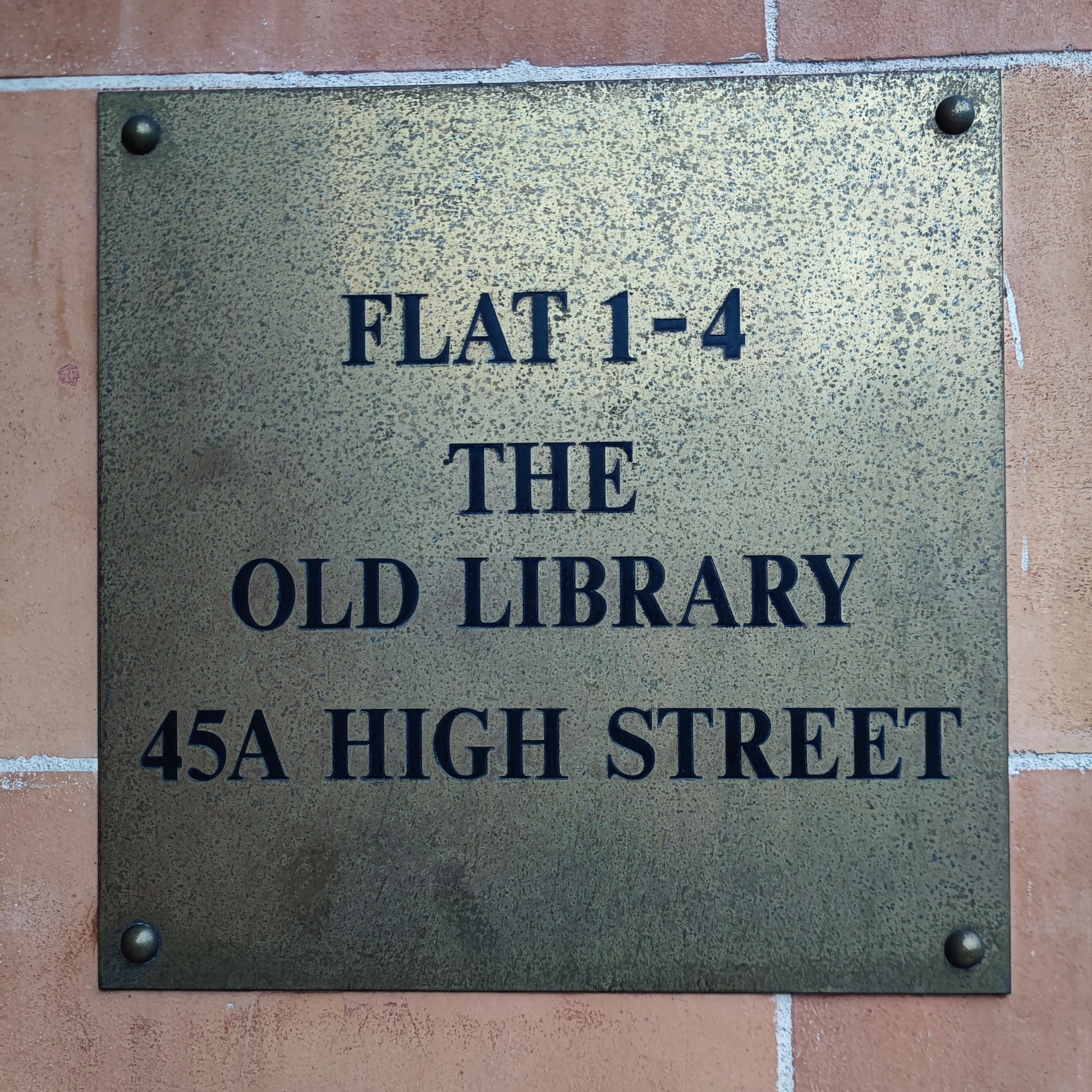
The plaque

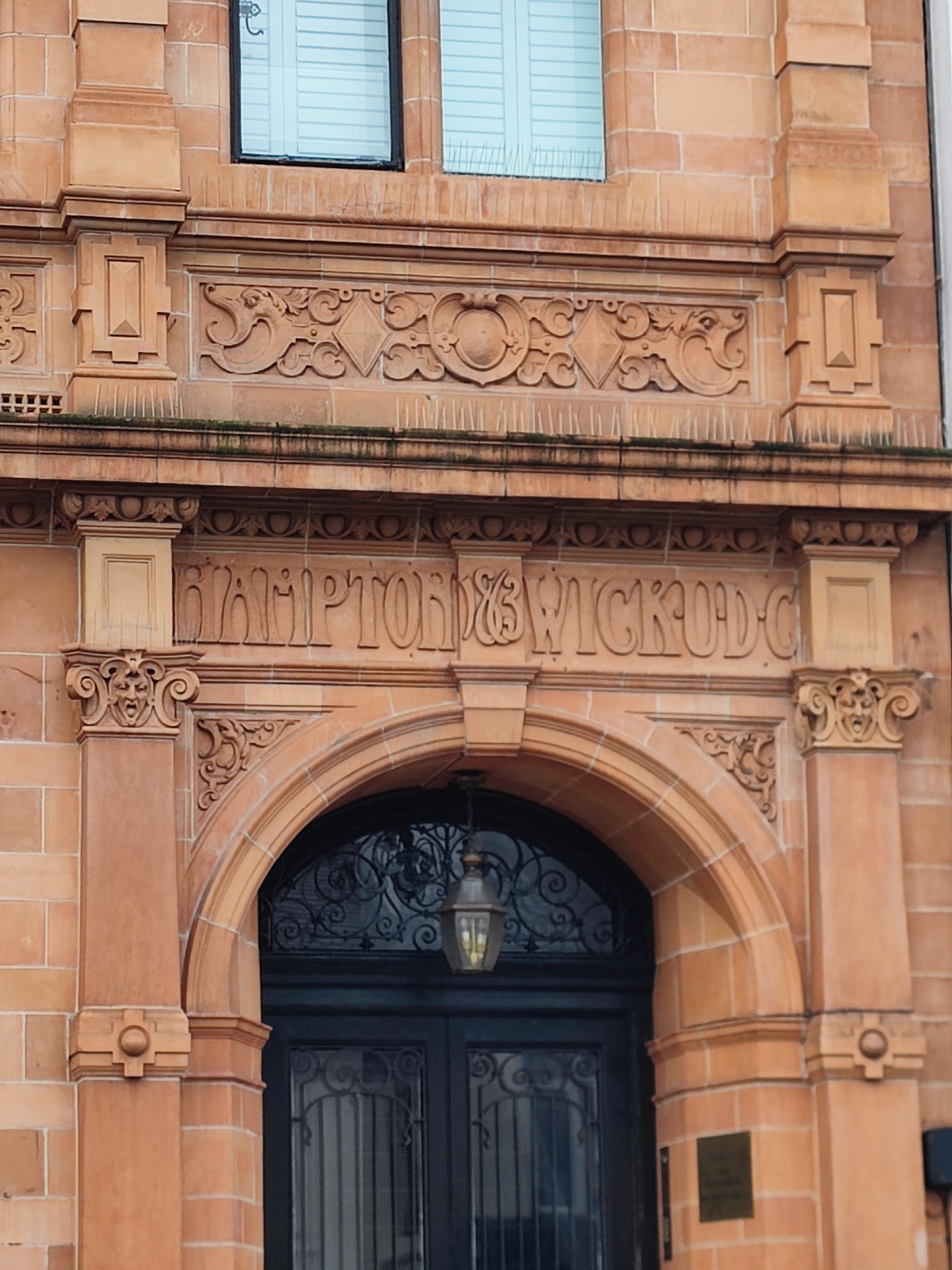
The architrave

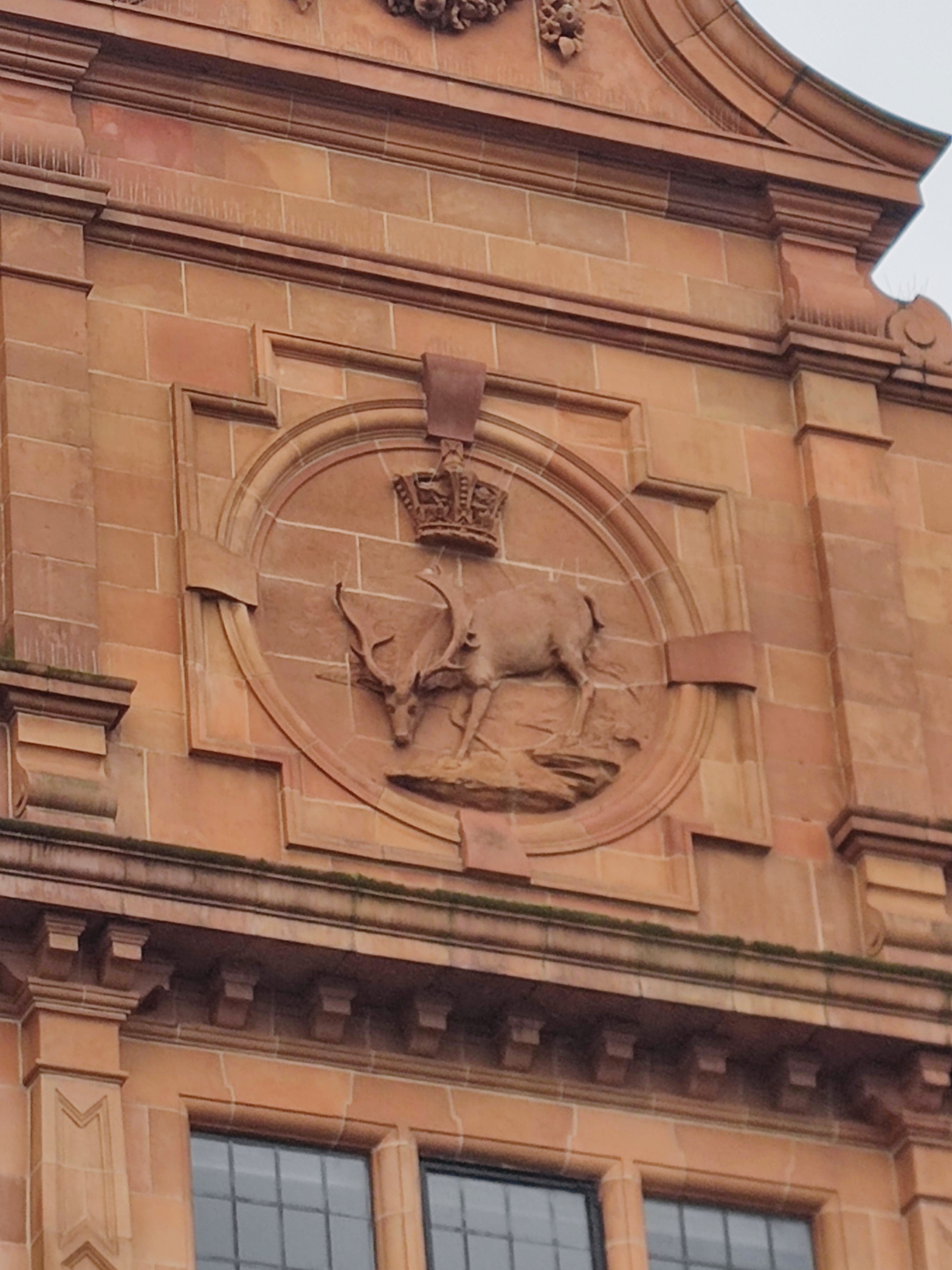
The roundel with the stag and crown, the seal of the local board
