= Calm Down Dearest =

2007 single by Jamie T

Single by Jamie T

from the album Panic Prevention
- B-side: "Feel Me"; "Fox News"
- Released: 15 January 2007
- Length: 4:41
- Label: Virgin
- Songwriter: Jamie T
- Producers: Jamie T; Ben "Puffy Combes" Coupland

Jamie T singles chronology
| "If You Got the Money" (2006) | "Calm Down Dearest" (2007) | "Sticks 'n' Stones" (2009) |

"Calm Down Dearest" is the third single released from English singer Jamie T's debut studio album, Panic Prevention (2007). The song was written and produced by Jamie T and Ben "Puffy Combes" Coupland, with additional production from Jason Cox. The song peaked at No. 9 on the UK Singles Chart in January 2007. A music video was released for the song, which was directed by Nima Nourizadeh and depicts Jamie T in a mock home video recorded in his flat.

== Track listings ==
UK 7-inch single disc 1

A. "Calm Down Dearest"
B. "Calm Down Dearest" (acoustic version)

UK 7-inch single disc 2

A. "Calm Down Dearest"
B. "Feel Me"

UK CD single

1. "Calm Down Dearest"
2. "Fox News"

== Charts ==
| Chart (2007) | Peak position |
|---|---|
| Scotland Singles (OCC) | 6 |
| UK Singles (OCC) | 9 |
