= St John's Hampton Wick =

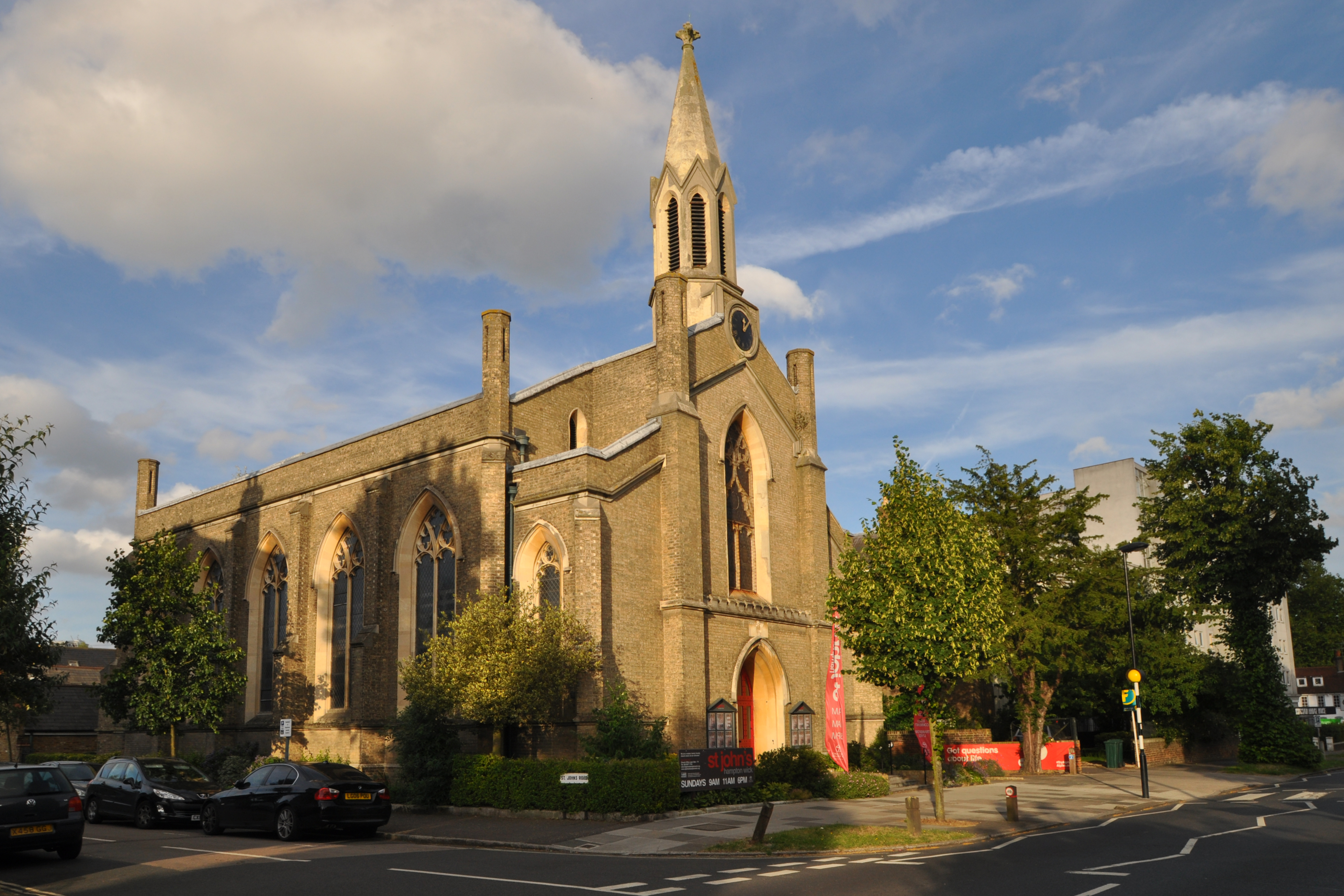
- St John's Hampton Wick
- 51°24′42.7″N 0°18′45.9″W
- OS grid reference: TQ 17441 69444
- Location: Church Grove and St John’s Road, Hampton Wick KT1 4AL
- Country: England
- Denomination: Church of England
- Website: stjohnshamptonwick.org/home/

Architecture
- Architect: Edward Lapidge
- Style: Gothic Revival
- Years built: 1829-30

Administration
- Diocese: Anglican Diocese of London

Clergy
- Vicar: The Revd Jerry field

Listed Building – Grade II
- Official name: Church of St John
- Designated: 25 June 1983
- Reference no.: 1080843

St John's Hampton Wick is a Grade II listed Church of England church on Church Grove and St John's Road in Hampton Wick, in the London Borough of Richmond upon Thames. It was built to a design by Edward Lapidge in 1829–30.

== History ==
St John's was originally conceived as a chapel of ease to the parish church of St Mary at Hampton about 2 1/2 miles away, but following its completion, the district assigned to it was made a separate parish. The Church Commissioners funded its construction on the condition that the parish church should also be enlarged at the same time. The cost of the church and the enclosure of the site was about £4,500. The first stone was laid on 7 October 1829, and the building was completed by 8 November 1830.

The building's architect Edward Lapidge also donated the land for it, and paid for the enclosure of the site on one side. Lapidge had been born in Hampton Wick, and designed the present Kingston Bridge nearby.

It was built in a plain Gothic Revival style, faced with Suffolk brick and Bath stone. As originally constructed, the church was 65 feet (20 m) long and 43 feet (13 m) wide, with galleries on three sides, and a recessed window at the east end. It was intended to seat 800 people, half the accommodation being free (i.e. not subject to pew rent). A chancel was added in 1887 and the church was restored in 1880 and 1911.
