= Henry Eccles =

English composer (1670–1742)

Henry (Henri) Eccles (1670–1742) was an English composer.

== Early life ==
He was the son of composer Solomon Eccles and the brother of composer John Eccles.

== Accomplishments ==
As a violinist, Henry Eccles became part of the entourage of the Duke d'Aumont, French ambassador to Britain, with whom he returned to France around 1713. In 1720 he published, in Paris, Twelve Solos for the Violin dedicated to the Chevalier Joseph Gage, an English gentleman much involved in Parisian financial speculation at the time.

This book of sonatas contained borrowings from Giuseppe Valentini's op. 8, which were used to assemble sonatas 1, 4, 8, and 9 (with single movements by Valentini incorporated into sonatas 3 and 10). The most well known sonata from this volume, number 11 in G minor, appears to have been largely the work of Eccles himself, though he excerpted the second movement (the Corrente) from Francesco Bonporti's Opus 10. In 1723, Eccles produced a further volume of sonatas for violin and figured bass with an additional two sonatas for flute.
