= If You Got the Money =

Single by Jamie T

from the album Panic Prevention
- Released: 25 September 2006
- Genre: Indie rock; ska
- Length: 3:42 Radio edit 4:04 Album edit
- Label: Virgin
- Songwriter: Jamie Treays

Jamie T singles chronology
"Sheila" (2006)	"If You Got the Money" (2006)	"Calm Down Dearest" (2007)

"If You Got the Money" is the second single by Jamie T and the eleventh track on his debut album Panic Prevention. It features a sample from the Inner Circle song "Sweat (A La La La La Long)". On the UK Singles Chart, the single reached number 13.

The B-side of the 7" version features three songs: "A New England", "Here's Ya Getaway", and "If You Got The Money" (Miloco demo version).

== Charts ==
Chart (2006)	Peak position
UK Singles (Official Charts)	13
UK Hip Hop/R&B (Official Charts)	1

== Personnel ==
Performed by Jamie T except:

- James Dring – drum programming
- Jason Cox – additional percussion, keyboards
- Louis Felber – guitar
- James Dunston – bass
- Ceri Evans – keyboards
- Ben Coupland – drums

== Sales and certifications ==
Region	Certification	Certified units/sales
United Kingdom (BPI)	Gold	400,000^{‡}
^{‡} Sales+streaming figures based on certification alone.
