= Kings & Queens (Jamie T album) =

2009 British post-punk album

Studio album by Jamie T
- Released: 7 September 2009 (UK); 6 October 2009 (USA)
- Recorded: 2008–2009
- Genre: Indie rock; post-punk revival; hip hop
- Length: 40:42
- Label: Astralwerks, Virgin, Tearbridge International
- Producer: Jamie T, Ben Coupland

Jamie T chronology
Chaka Demus (2009)	Kings & Queens (2009)	The Man's Machine (2009)

Singles from Kings & Queens
- 1. "Sticks 'N' Stones" Released: 29 June 2009; 2. "Chaka Demus" Released: 31 August 2009; 3. "The Man's Machine" Released: 23 November 2009; 4. "Emily's Heart" Released: 15 March 2010

Kings & Queens is the second album by English singer-songwriter Jamie T, released first in the UK on 7 September 2009. The album reached No. 2 on the UK Albums Chart.

== Singles ==
The first single released from the album was "Sticks 'n' Stones" released on 29 June 2009. The titular EP featured three B-sides: "St. Christopher", "On The Green", and "The Dance of the Young Professionals"; and reached No. 15 on the UK singles chart.

"Chaka Demus" was the second single to be released from the album and was out a week before the album, on 31 August. It peaked at No. 23 on the UK singles chart. The namesake EP also featured three B-sides: "Forget Me Not (The Love I Knew Before I Grew)" (feat. Hollie Cook & Ben Bones), "Planning Spontaneity", and "When They Are Gone (For Tim)".

"The Man's Machine" was the third single from the album, released on 23 November 2009. The song interpolates intros from the Angelic Upstarts with The Rockin' Berries' cover of "Poor Man's Son", among a few others. This EP, too, featured three B-sides: "Believing in Things That Can't Be Done"; "Jenny Can Rely on Me"; and "Man, Not a Monster".

The album's fourth single—a re-recorded version of "Emily's Heart", along with a cover Bruce Springsteen's "Atlantic City" as a B-side—was released on 15 March 2010. A music video for "Emily's Heart" preceded it in February 2010.

== Critical reception ==
Professional ratings
Aggregate scores
Source	Rating
Metacritic	74/100
Review scores
Source	Rating
AllMusic	AllMusic's blue stars match their website layout; Jamie T scored 3.5/5 blue stars.
Alternative Press	3/5 stars
AltSounds	7.6/10 stars
CHARTattack	7/10 stars
Drowned in Sound	9/10 teal-dots
Evening Standard	5/5 stars
The Guardian	4/5 stars
The List	4/5 teal-dots
musicOMH	4/5 stars
NME	3.5/5 red-stars
NOW	NOW Magazine uses a capital 'N' in lieu of a star to rate albums, films, et al. This received a maximum 5/5 Ns.
The Observer	10/10 stars
PopMatters	4/10 teal-dots
Robert Christgau	(2-star Honorable Mention)
The Scotsman	3/5 stars
The Telegraph	4/5 stars

The album received much praise in reviews from critics, with Brianna Saraceno of Drowned in Sound proclaiming it "a resounding success". Dan LeRoy of Alternative Press likened him to a "clash" between The Clash's Joe Strummer and Mick Jones. According to the review aggregator Metacritic, Kings & Queens received "generally favorable reviews" based on a weighted average score of 74 out of 100 from 13 critic scores.

== Track listing ==
All lyrics are written by Jamie Alexander Treays, unless otherwise indicated.

Kings & Queens track listing
No.	Title	Writer(s)	Producer(s)	Length
1.	"368"	Jamie Treays	Jamie T; Jason Cox • James Dring	4:43
2.	"Hocus Pocus"	Treays	Jamie T; Ben "Bones" Coupland	3:30
3.	"Sticks 'n' Stones"	Treays	Jamie T; Bones; Cenzo Townshend	4:00
4.	"The Man's Machine"	Treays; Coupland /; Thomas Mensforth • Raymond Cowie^{[a]} /; JoAnne Bratton; Bob Hamilton; Ronnie Savoy; Steve Venet^{[b]} /; Tony Fisher • Emmett Nixon • Robert Reed • Taylor Reed^{[c]}	Jamie T; Bones; Stephen Street	4:50
5.	"Emily's Heart"	Treays	Jamie T; Cox; Dring	4:07
6.	"Chaka Demus"	Treays	Jamie T; Cox; Dring; Tom Elmhirst^{[d]}	3:34
7.	"Spider's Web"	Treays	Jamie T; Bones	4:44
8.	"Castro Dies"	Treays; Tom Stanley	Jamie T; Stanley	2:59
9.	"Earth, Wind & Fire"	Treays; Bones; Joan Baez^{[e]}	Jamie T; Bones	3:45
10.	"British Intelligence"	Treays	Jamie T; Cox; Dring	3:18
11.	"Jilly Armeen"	Treays	Jamie T; Bones; Jimmy Robertson	3:12
Total length:				40:42

Bonus tracks (iTunes only)^{[f]}
No.	Title	Writer(s)	Producer(s)	Length
12.	"The Curious Sound" (feat. Ben Bones)	Treays; Coupland	Jamie T; Bones	2:52
Total length:				43:34

Bonus tracks (limited)^{[g]}
No.	Title	Writer(s)	Producer(s)	Length
13.	"Direction Home"	Treays	Jamie T; Bones	2:34
Total length:				46:08

Bonus tracks (Japanese edition)^{[h]}
No.	Title	Writer(s)	Producer(s)	Length
14.	"St. Christopher"	Treays	Jamie T; Bones	3:57
15.	"On the Green"	Treays; Coupland	Jamie T; Bones; Robertson	3:36
16.	"Spider's Web" (live at the Electric Ballroom)	Treays	Jamie T; Bones	4:44
17.	"Chaka Demus" (Toddla T remix)	Treays	Toddla T; Jamie T; Cox; Dring; Elmhirst	3:34
Total length:				1:01:59

Notes

- ^{^[a]} During the intro to "The Man's Machine", an amalgamation of three spoken word intros from the Angelic Upstarts' 1981 Live album are blended: "Police Oppression", "Kids on the Streets", + "You're Nicked"—with the latter being the most prominently featured.
- ^{^[b]} Throughout the intro, an interpolation of The Rockin' Berries' cover version of "Poor Man's Son" underscores the monologue. It was first recorded by The Reflections, who were signed by co-lyricist JoAnne Bratton's label.
- ^{^[c]} Excerpts of other songs sampled during verses of "The Man's Machine" include: "Pump Me Up" by Trouble Funk; "The Trouser Press" by the Bonzo Dog Doo-Dah Band; & "Watch Yourself" by Nine Below Zero. However, only the former received songwriting credits.
- ^{^[d]} Albeit uncredited, the opening melody of "Chaka Demus" was interpolated from The Banana Splits' TV theme song, "The Tra La La Song (One Banana, Two Banana)".
- ^{^[e]} A sample from Joan Baez's rendition of "Queen of Hearts" was utilized for the intro to "Earth, Wind & Fire". Although traditional, she received composition credit.
- ^{^[f]} "The Curious Sound" was available via iTunes downloads only.
- ^{^[g]} "Direction Home" was only available on select streaming services.
- ^{^[h]} Both "On the Green" and "St. Christopher" first appeared on the Sticks 'n' Stones EP, which preceded this album's initial UK + USA releases.

== Release in Japan ==
Kings & Queens was released in Japan by Tearbridge International on 17 February 2010.

== Sales and certifications ==
Region	Certification	Certified units/sales
United Kingdom (BPI)	Gold	100,000^{^}
^{^} Shipments figures based on certification alone.
