= Zombie (Jamie T song) =

Single by Jamie T

from the album Carry On the Grudge
- Released: 12 August 2014
- Genre: Indie rock
- Length: 4:06
- Label: Virgin
- Songwriter(s): Jamie Treays

Jamie T singles chronology
"Don't You Find" (2014)	"Zombie" (2014)	"Tinfoil Boy" (2014)

"Zombie" is a song by English singer-songwriter Jamie T. It was released as the second single from his third studio album Carry On the Grudge (2014). It peaked at 36 of the charts and was there for eleven weeks.

At the 2015 NME Awards, "Zombie" won two awards: Best Track and Best Video.

== Background ==
"Zombie" is an indie rock song about being unproductive. In an interview with Time Out, Jamie said, "[I]t can be frustrating when you don’t feel you’re writing anything new. There’s lots of different tricks you can use to get yourself writing again. The best one’s probably to read a book. Just seeing someone else say something in a different way immediately sparks you out of your own shit. On this record, I was reading a lot of Ted Hughes. Lots of Plath and Alvarez."

== Critical reception ==
Ed Potton of The Times called the song "a cocktail of self-loathing and muscular poetry with a chorus that weirdly but brilliantly recalls Billy Joel's We Didn't Start the Fire."

== Music video ==
The music video, directed by James Slater, was inspired by the film Shaun of the Dead (2005). It features Jamie and his band performing in a near-empty pub. As the song goes on, they begin turning into zombies. Limbs fall off, but no one else in the pub pays any attention.

== Charts ==
Chart (2014)	Peak position
UK Singles (OCC)	36

== Sales and certifications ==
Region	Certification	Certified units/sales
United Kingdom (BPI)	Platinum	600,000^{‡}
^{‡} Sales+streaming figures based on certification alone.
