= Sticks 'n' Stones (EP) =

2009 Jamie T extended play album

EP by Jamie T
- Released: 29 June 2009
- Genre: Indie rock
- Length: 14:49
- Label: Virgin
- Producer: Jamie T, Ben Bones

Jamie T chronology
Panic Prevention (2007)	Sticks 'n' Stones (2009)	Chaka Demus (2009)

Professional ratings
Review scores
Source	Rating
Daily Mirror	5/5 stars
Digital Spy	4/5 stars

Sticks 'n' Stones is an extended play (EP) released by English singer-songwriter Jamie T on 29 June 2009. It served as the lead single (and the third track) from his second album, Kings & Queens, which premiered later on 7 September 2009. The EP was his first release since his first album, Panic Prevention, in 2007. The EP peaked at number 15 on the UK singles chart and was later certified platinum by the British Phonographic Industry for sales and streams exceeding 600,000.

== Background ==
According to Treays, per an interview with Q magazine, "Sticks 'n' Stones" was inspired by reminiscing of times spent travelling on the train and the various things he would see along the way. He also thought it sounded a bit like the music of The Police. The EP was his first official release of the year, following the 12 January 2009 upload of a music video and free .mp3 download for "Fire Fire", a teaser song for fans' patience that would later be included on the compilation album, B Sides (06-17) (2018).

Included on this EP, aside from the titular track, were an additional three songs—all of which were B-sides that had previously been unreleased. "On the Green" was uploaded to Jamie T's MySpace around the time of release, while "St Christopher" was given an exclusive preview on Lauren Laverne's BBC Radio 6 Music show on Saturday 20 June 2009. Australian digital publication Concrete Playground described fourth track "The Dance of the Young Professionals" as an "ironic pirate shanty". The song was interpolated with "Hungarian Dance No. 5" by German composer Johannes Brahms.

== Music video ==
The "Sticks 'n' Stones" music video premiered on 18 June 2009. It was directed by Adam Powell, who previously worked with Jamie T on his promo single video, "Fire Fire"; and would later collaborate on "The Man's Machine" video—the third single from Kings & Queens. Powell stated that their goal here was to keep it "lo-fi" akin to the skate videos (which are Powell's forte).

Jamie's real-life friends were featured alongside him in the "Sticks 'n' Stones" music video. While throwing stones towards the camera—per Powell's direction—one hit the lens and cracked it, which is visible around the 1:26 mark of the YouTube video.

== Critical response ==
The critical reception has been positive for the EP, with nearly universal acclaim for the hit titular single. Daily Mirror's music critic Gavin Martin dubbed Jamie T a "one-man 21st century Clash" and praised the entire EP, particularly the lead single for tackling themes such as "ASBO Britain…weed…breakups," and more in a "blistering, layered, rap narrative". Writing for Digital Spy, Alex Fletcher lauded the title track, proclaiming it to be "lighthearted, joyous and pumped to the brim with adrenaline," and stating one would "struggle to find a better indie anthem this summer."

In his review for Clash, Mike Diver commended how the nostalgic feel of "Sticks 'n' Stones" blends with its pungent lyrics. Clash editor Robin Murray echoed the sentiment, stating it "transcends time and place to become a bona fide anthem". Werk.Re, in a positive review, hailed it as another "kitchen sink tale of juvenile delinquency and rudeboy fatalism".

Alastair Thompson of Gigwise complimented "Sticks 'n' Stones" for being radio-worthy, plus having lyrical depth; and "The Dance of the Young Professionals" for its ska influence. Likewise, Celina Murphy from Hot Press also praised "The Dance of the Young Professionals" for being "gloriously messy" live, and noted that "Sticks 'n' Stones" was received rapturously at the 25 February 2010 show at The Academy venue in Dublin, Ireland.

== Track listing ==
All lyrics are written by Jamie Alexander Treays, unless otherwise indicated..

Sticks 'n' Stones track listing
No.	Title	Writer(s)	Producer(s)	Length
1.	"Sticks 'n' Stones"	Jamie Treays	Jamie T; Ben "Bones" Coupland; Cenzo Townshend^{[a]}	4:04
2.	"St Christopher"	Treays	Jamie T; Bones	3:57
3.	"On the Green"	Treays; Coupland	Jamie T; Bones; Jimmy Robertson^{[a]}	3:36
4.	"The Dance of the Young Professionals"	Treays; Coupland^{[b]}	Jamie T; Bones; Greg "Wizard" Fleming^{[a]}	3:12
Total length:				14:49

Notes

- ^{^[a]} Indicative of an additional producer/mixing engineer.
- ^{^[b]} "The Dance of the Young Professionals" interpolates the orchestral "Hungarian Dance #5" by Johannes Brahms.

== Charts ==
=== Weekly charts ===
Chart (2009)^{[c]}	Peak position
Australian Albums (ARIA)	94
Scotland (OCC)	3
UK Singles (OCC)	15
UK Singles Downloads (OCC)	23

=== Year-end charts ===
Chart (2009)	Position
UK Singles (OCC)	200

Notes:

- ^{^[c]} The EP also peaked at number three for physical sales and remained inside the top 50 for 10 consecutive weeks.

== Certifications ==
Region	Certification	Certified units/sales
United Kingdom (BPI)	Platinum	600,000^{‡}
^{‡} Sales+streaming figures based on certification alone.
