= Carry On the Grudge =

Studio album by Jamie T
- Released: 29 September 2014
- Genre: Folk rock; indie rock; alternative rock
- Length: 45:57
- Label: Virgin, Epitaph

Jamie T chronology
The Man's Machine (2009)	Carry On the Grudge (2014)	Magnolia Melancholia (2015)

Singles from Carry On the Grudge
- 1. "Don't You Find" Released: 21 July 2014; 2. "Zombie" Released: 12 August 2014; 3. "Rabbit Hole" Released: 1 December 2014

Carry on the Grudge is the third album by English indie rock singer-songwriter Jamie T, released on 29 September 2014 through Virgin Records and Epitaph Records. The first single from the album, "Don't You Find", was released on 21 July 2014, followed by "Zombie" on 12 August.

The album was Jamie T's first release in over 5 years, with Jamie's comeback being described by the NME as the greatest music moment of 2014. The album received commercial success; most noticeably, the track "Zombie" of the album winning the 2014 NME Awards for best track and best video.

== Critical reception ==
Professional ratings
Aggregate scores
Source	Rating
Metacritic	81/100
Review scores
Source	Rating
AllMusic	4/5 stars
The Daily Telegraph	4/5 stars
Drowned in Sound	8/10
The Guardian	3/5 stars
The Line of Best Fit	8.5/10
Mojo	4/5 stars
musicOMH	4.5/5 stars
NME	9/10
Q	4/5 stars
Tom Hull	B+

According to the review aggregator Metacritic, Carry on the Grudge received "universal acclaim" based on a weighted average score of 81 out of 100 from 10 critic scores.

== Track listing ==
No.	Title	Length
1.	"Limits Lie"	4:11
2.	"Don't You Find"	4:16
3.	"Turn On the Light"	4:27
4.	"Zombie"	4:06
5.	"The Prophet"	4:15
6.	"Mary Lee"	3:25
7.	"Trouble"	2:57
8.	"Rabbit Hole"	3:40
9.	"Peter"	3:36
10.	"Love Is Only a Heartbeat Away"	2:33
11.	"Murder of Crows"	4:02
12.	"They Told Me It Rained"	4:30
Total length:		45:57

== Charts ==
Chart (2014)	Peak position
Australian Albums (ARIA)	35
Scottish Albums (OCC)	5
UK Albums (OCC)	4

== Sales and certifications ==
Region	Certification	Certified units/sales
United Kingdom (BPI)	Gold	100,000^{‡}
^{‡} Sales+streaming figures based on certification alone.
