= The Theory of Whatever =

Studio album by Jamie T
- Released: 22 July 2022
- Genre: Alternative rock • indie rock
- Length: 41:04
- Label: Polydor
- Producers: Charles Watson; Hugo White; Jamie Treays; Olly Burden; Tom Dinsdale

Jamie T chronology
Trick (2016)	The Theory of Whatever (2022)	Ghosts (100 Days of Morning) (2026)

Singles from The Theory of Whatever
- 1. "The Old Style Raiders" Released: 4 May 2022; 2. "St. George Wharf Tower" Released: 21 June 2022; 3. "Between the Rocks" Released: 20 July 2022

The Theory of Whatever is the fifth album by English indie rock singer-songwriter Jamie T, released on 22 July 2022 through Polydor Records. The first single from the album, "The Old Style Raiders", was released on 4 May 2022, followed by "St. George Wharf Tower" on 21 June, and "Between the Rocks" on 20 July.

The album was Jamie T's first release in nearly six years and entered the charts at number one in its first week of release. It spent one more week in the charts at 36th position.

== Critical reception ==
Professional ratings
Aggregate scores
Source	Rating
Metacritic	82/100
Review scores
Source	Rating
Clash	3.5/5 stars
DIY	5/5 stars
The Guardian	4/5 stars
The Independent	4/5 stars
NME	4/5 stars
The Observer	4/5 stars
Rolling Stone	4/5 stars
The Telegraph	4/5 stars

According to the review aggregator Metacritic, The Theory of Whatever received "universal acclaim" based on a weighted average score of 82 out of 100 from 11 critic scores. NME stated the album was a "liberating return from a star as relaxed as ever", in their review where it received four out of five stars.

== Track listing ==
All lyrics are written by Jamie Alexander Treays, unless otherwise indicated.

The Theory of Whatever track listing
No.	Title	Writer(s)	Producer(s)	Length
1.	"90s Cars"	Jamie Treays; Tom Dinsdale; Alex Chilton^{[a]}	Treays; Dinsdale; Hugo White	3:17
2.	"The Old Style Raiders"	Treays	Treays; White	3:55
3.	"British Hell"	Treays; Glenn Danzig^{[b]}	Treays; Dinsdale; White	2:11
4.	"The Terror of Lambeth Love"	Treays; Charles Watson; Olly Burden	Treays; Burden; Watson	1:46
5.	"Keying Lamborghinis"	Treays; Dinsdale	Treays; Dinsdale; White	3:30
6.	"St. George Wharf Tower"	Treays	Treays; White	3:10
7.	"A Million & One New Ways to Die"	Treays	Treays; White	3:17
8.	"Thank You"	Treays; Matt Maltese; White	Treays; White	4:00
9.	"Between the Rocks"	Treays; White	Treays; White	3:31
10.	"Sabre Tooth"	Treays	Treays; White	3:24
11.	"Talk Is Cheap"	Treays; Burden	Treays; Burden	3:03
12.	"Old Republican"	Treays	Treays; White	3:23
13.	"50,000 Unmarked Bullets"	Treays	Treays; White	2:27
Total length:				41:04

Deluxe edition
No.	Title	Writer(s)	Producer(s)	Length
14.	"Bonnie & Clyde"	Treays	Treays; White	3:01
15.	"Kill, Kill, Kill"	Treays; Burden	Treays; Burden	2:48
16.	"Run of the Mill" (feat. Bessie Turner)	Treays; Turner; Burden	Treays; Burden	3:15
Total length:				50:10

Digital bonus track
No.	Title	Writer(s)	Producer(s)	Length
17.	"The Luddite"	Treays; Burden	Treays; Burden	2:22
Total length:				52:32

European 7" vinyl release only
No.	Title	Writer(s)	Producer(s)	Length
18.	"Camber Love"	Treays	Treays; Dinsdale	2:11
Total length:				54:43

Notes

- ^{^[a]} "90s Cars" is interpolated over This Mortal Coil's cover of Big Star's "Kanga Roo", written by frontman Chilton.
- ^{^[b]} "British Hell" utilizes a sample of American punk-rock band Misfits' 1981 song, "London Dungeon" (written by frontman, Glenn Danzig), as its chorus.

== Personnel ==
Musicians

- Jamie T – vocals, background vocals (all tracks); programming (1–5, 10), guitar (2–4, 6, 7, 9–11), bass programming (3); bass, drums (9); piano (13)
- Rupert Jarvis – bass (1–3, 5, 7, 10)
- Jamie Morrison – drums (1–3, 5, 7, 10)
- Rob Harris – bass programming (1)
- Nerys Richard – cello (1)
- Hal Ritson – keyboards, programming (1)
- Richard Adlam – keyboards, programming (1)
- Hugo White – guitar (2, 3, 7–10), bass (8, 9, 13), programming (8–10), drums (9)
- Olly Burden – programming (4, 11), guitar (4)
- Matt Maltese – background vocals, guitar (8)

Technical

- John Davis – mastering
- Cenzo Townshend – mixing
- Jag Jago – engineering (1–3, 5–10, 12, 13)
- Olly Burden – engineering (4, 11)
- Camden Clarke – mixing assistance
- Jan Ashwell – mixing assistance
- Robert Sellens – mixing assistance

== Charts ==
Chart performance for The Theory of Whatever
Chart (2022)	Peak position
Australian Digital Albums (ARIA)	48
Scottish Albums (Official Charts)	1
UK Albums (Official Charts)	1
