= Panic Prevention =

Studio album by Jamie T
- Released: 29 January 2007
- Recorded: 2006
- Genres: British hip hop; indie rock; ska; rap rock; indie pop; folk punk; EDM
- Length: 49:32
- Label: Virgin Records
- Producers: Jamie T, Ben Coupland

Jamie T chronology
Panic Prevention (2007)	Sticks 'N' Stones (2009)

Professional ratings
Aggregate scores
Source	Rating
Metacritic	71/100
Review scores
Source	Rating
AllMusic	3/5 stars
Alternative Press	4/5 stars
The Guardian	3/5 stars
NME	8/10
The Observer	5/5 stars
PopMatters	8/10
Q	3/5 stars
The Skinny	4/5 stars
Spin	3/5 stars
Uncut	4/5 stars

Panic Prevention is the debut album by English indie rock singer-songwriter Jamie T, released in the United Kingdom on 29 January 2007. The album is so-called because of the panic attacks Jamie suffered as an adolescent. Most of the songs on the album deal with aspects of modern 'youth' culture in the UK (for example binge drinking), and as such has been strongly compared to the works of the Streets, Lily Allen and the Libertines. Three singles have been released from the album prior to its release: "Sheila", "If You Got the Money" and "Calm Down Dearest".

== Critical reception ==
According to the review aggregator Metacritic, Panic Prevention received "generally favorable reviews" based on a weighted average score of 71 out of 100 from 19 critic scores.

== Track listing ==
All songs written by Jamie T except where noted.

1. "Brand New Bass Guitar" – 2:08
2. "Salvador" (Jamie T/Ben 'Bones' Coupland) – 3:32
3. "Calm Down Dearest" – 4:41
4. "So Lonely Was the Ballad" - 3.50
5. "Back in the Game" – 2:29
6. "Operation" (Jamie T/Ben 'Bones' Coupland) – 5:48
7. "Sheila" (Jamie T/John Betjeman/Jim Parker) – 4:19
8. "Pacemaker" – 3:26
9. "Dry Off Your Cheeks" – 5:03
10. "Ike & Tina" – 3:39
11. "If You Got the Money" (Jamie T/Ian Lewis) – 4:04
12. "Alicia Quays" – 6:29
13. "Northern Line" (bonus track) - 3:45
14. "Down to the Subway" (bonus track) - 3:25
15. "Here's Ya Getaway" (bonus track) - 4:42

== Credits ==
Performed by Jamie T except:

- Pacemaker
  - James Dring - drum programming
  - Alfie 'Larrikin' Ambrose - bass
  - Coz 'Larrikin' Kerrigan - drums
  - Jason Cox - additional keyboards
- Ike & Tina
  - James Dring - keyboards, drum programming
- If You Got The Money
  - James Dring - drum programming
  - Jason Cox - additional percussion, keyboards
  - Luis Felber - guitar
  - James Dunston - bass
  - Ceri Evans - keyboards
  - Ben Coupland - drums
- Northern Line (bonus track)
  - Jason Cox, James Dring - keyboards, drum programming

== Charts ==
=== Weekly charts ===
Weekly chart performance for Panic Prevention
Chart (2007)	Peak position
Australian Albums (ARIA)	88
French Albums (SNEP)	182
Irish Albums (IRMA)	57
Scottish Albums (Official Charts)	4
Swedish Albums (Sverigetopplistan)	46
UK Albums (Official Charts)	4

=== Year-end charts ===
Year-end chart performance for Panic Prevention
Chart (2007)	Position
UK Albums (OCC)	100

== Sales and certifications ==
Region	Certification	Certified units/sales
United Kingdom (BPI)	Platinum	300,000^{‡}
^{‡} Sales+streaming figures based on certification alone.
