= Ghosts (100 Days of Morning) =

2026 studio album by Jamie T

Studio album by Jamie T
- Released: 9 October 2026
- Genre: Indie rock
- Length: 39:41
- Label: Polydor

Jamie T chronology
The Theory of Whatever (2022)	Ghosts (100 Days of Morning) (2026)

Singles from Ghosts (100 Days of Morning)
- 1. "3310" Released: 18 August 2026; 2. "Tallahassee" Released: 18 September 2026; 3. "Waist 36 Leg 32" Released: 7 October 2026

Ghosts (100 Days of Morning) is the sixth studio album by British singer-songwriter Jamie T, released on 9 October 2026 through Polydor Records.

== Composition ==
The album was announced on 18 August 2026 with the release of the lead single "3310". Jamie T described the album as "Everyone has a part of themselves they keep at arm's length, even from the people they love. 'Ghosts' to me is about seeing that version of yourself for the first time in a long time and trying to hold on to it. This album is me trying to find that again". He used voice notes from his entire career as the inspiration for the album, and recorded it over around 100 days. On 20 August, Jamie T played songs from the album for the first time, in a performance arranged at short notice at Scala in London; he announced a seven-date tour for December.

== Artwork ==
The album's cover shows an artwork by TAMP, an anonymous graffiti artist from Bognor Regis who paints the columns under a flyover to look like objects, including a cigarette. Jamie T gained permission to use the artwork before recording the album.

== Commercial performance ==
The album entered at number one on the UK Albums Chart, making it Jamie T's second consecutive number one album. It sold 18,494 units in its first week. The album also topped the Official Vinyl Albums Chart and the Official Record Store Chart.

== Reception ==
Professional ratings
Review scores
Source	Rating
Clash	7/10
Louder Than War	5/5 stars
MusicOMH	4/5 stars
NME	4.5/5 stars

Rhian Daly of NME called the album "Jamie T in peak form – as powerful a songwriter as ever, now backed with a sense of positivity and peace".

== Track listing ==
All lyrics are written by Jamie Alexander Treays, unless otherwise indicated.

The Theory of Whatever track listing
No.	Title	Writer(s)	Producer(s)	Length
1.	"3310"	Treays; James Dring	Dring; Treays	3:02
2.	"Cocktail"	Treays; Damon Albarn; Dring	Dring; Treays	3:45
3.	"Waist 36 Leg 32"	Treays; Dring	Dring; Treays	3:50
4.	"All I Wanna See Is Now"	Treays; Olly Burden	Burden; Treays	3:47
5.	"The Won"	Treays; Dring	Dring; Treays	3:31
6.	"Chelsea Girls"	Treays; Dring	Dring; Treays	4:34
7.	"Ghosts"	Paul Weller	Dring; Treays	2:06
8.	"Crimson & Clover"	Treays; Dring	Dring; Treays	3:49
9.	"Crucible"	Treays; Hugo White	Treays; White	3:18
10.	"Caught Cheating"	Treays; Dring	Dring; Treays	3:34
11.	"Tallahassee" (feat. Leif Vollebekk)	Treays; Vollebekk; White	Treays; White	4:25
Total length:				39:41
