= Sheila (Jamie T song) =

Single by Jamie T

from the album Panic Prevention
- Released: 10 July 2006
- Length: 4:19
- Label: Virgin
- Songwriters: Jamie Treays, John Betjeman, Jim Parker
- Producers: Jamie Treays, Ben Coupland

Jamie T singles chronology
"Sheila" (2006)	"If You Got the Money" (2007)

"Sheila" is the debut single by British singer Jamie T. Released in July 2006 and re-released in April 2007, it reached a peak of number 15 on the UK Singles Chart, and was certified silver, gold and platinum by the British Phonographic Industry in 2015, 2018 and 2020, respectively. In the song, Jamie T narrates the lives and deaths of three characters from London.

== Composition ==
In the song, Jamie T narrates the lives and deaths of three characters from London: Sheila, who gets drunk and falls in the Thames; Jack, a drug dealer who is murdered after his girlfriend cheats on him; and Georgina, an abuse victim who dies by suicide by overdose.

The song contains lines from the poem "The Cockney Amorist" by John Betjeman, a former poet laureate who died in 1984. The poem is about a widower who visits sites in London he used to visit with his wife, and the sample is a recording of the poem by Betjeman himself on his 1974 album Banana Blush, which Jamie T owned.

The line "Good heavens you boys, blue-blooded murder of the English tongue!" has been incorrectly attributed to Betjeman or as a sample from the film My Fair Lady; Jamie T wanted to sample a similar line said by Rex Harrison in the film, but he could not gain permission. The line heard in the song was said by Jamie T's father, who was actually angry after being taken upstairs for the recording. The song also contains a sample from Lock, Stock and Two Smoking Barrels.

== Videos ==
The song had two music videos, one for each release. The first featured a pair of monkeys living together in a household, in a dysfunctional relationship. The second video featured actor Bob Hoskins walking down the Thames at night, lip synching the lyrics. Hoskins agreed to the video after being sent the music by Jamie T.

== Reception ==
Reviews in the NME and by Fraser McAlpine for BBC Radio 1 commented that the song felt uplifting despite its sad concept. The NME likened Jamie T's "patois" vocals to contemporary Plan B, and to Joe Strummer. Dom Gourlay of Drowned in Sound concluded that "Sheila" would "only establish [Jamie T's] position as one of the most invigorating new lyricists of the 21st Century even further".
