= Trick (Jamie T album) =

Studio album by Jamie T
- Released: 2 September 2016
- Genre: Indie rock; post-punk revival; alternative rock; electronica; rap rock; alternative hip hop
- Length: 48:46
- Label: Virgin, Harvest
- Producer: James Dring, Jamie T

Jamie T chronology
Magnolia Melancholia (2015)	Trick (2016)	The Theory of Whatever (2022)

Singles from Trick
- 1. "Tinfoil Boy" Released: 30 June 2016; 2. "Power Over Men" Released: 10 August 2016; 3. "Drone Strike" Released: 31 August 2016

Trick is the fourth album by London indie rock artist Jamie T, released on 2 September 2016 through Virgin Records and Harvest Records. The first single from the album was "Tinfoil Boy", which was first played on Annie Mac's Radio 1 show on 29 June, and was released for download on 30 June. The second single from the album, "Power Over Men", was first played as Annie Mac's 'Hottest Record in the World' on 9 August, and was made available on streaming services the following day. On 30 August, Annie Mac also played 2 of the album tracks - "Tescoland" and "Sign of the Times", and on the same day Zane Lowe premiered the album track "Drone Strike" on Beats 1, which was made available on streaming services the following day. The album was released in full at midnight on 2 September.

To promote the album, Jamie T embarked on an extensive 18-date tour of the UK and Ireland, including 3 nights at London's Brixton Academy.

The album artwork is the 1843 Paul Falconer Poole work entitled "Solomon Eagle", which depicts the English composer and Quaker Solomon Eagle - the subject of track 8 on the album.

== Reception ==
Professional ratings
Aggregate scores
Source	Rating
AnyDecentMusic?	7.2/10
Metacritic	78/100
Review scores
Source	Rating
AllMusic	4/5 stars
Clash	8/10
Evening Standard	4/5 stars
The Guardian	3/5 stars
The Independent	2/5 stars
NME	5/5
The Observer	4/5 stars
Q	4/5 stars
The Times	2/5 stars
Uncut	7/10

Trick has been greeted with enthusiasm by music critics, with many praising the diversity of genres on the album. According to the review aggregator Metacritic, Trick received "generally favorable reviews" based on a weighted average score of 78 out of 100 from 13 critic scores.

=== Accolades ===
Publication	Accolade	Year	Rank
NME	NME's Albums of the Year 2016	2016	14

== Track listing ==
No.	Title	Length
1.	"Tinfoil Boy"	4:13
2.	"Drone Strike"	3:26
3.	"Power Over Men"	3:39
4.	"Tescoland"	4:00
5.	"Police Tapes"	4:20
6.	"Dragon Bones"	4:09
7.	"Joan of Arc"	3:37
8.	"Solomon Eagle"	3:50
9.	"Robin Hood"	3:24
10.	"Sign of the Times"	4:11
11.	"Crossfire Love"	4:30
12.	"Self Esteem"	5:27
Total length:		48:46

== Charts ==
Chart (2016)	Peak position
Australian Albums (ARIA)	35
Irish Albums (IRMA)	100
Scottish Albums (OCC)	6
UK Albums (OCC)	3
