= Chaka Demus (EP) =

2009 Jamie T extended play album

EP by Jamie T
- Released: 31 August 2009
- Recorded: 2008–2009
- Genres: Indie rock, hip hop, ska
- Length: 15:34
- Label: Virgin Records
- Producers: Jamie T, Ben Bones

Jamie T chronology
Sticks 'n' Stones (2009)	Chaka Demus (2009)	Kings & Queens (2009)

Professional ratings
Review scores
Source	Rating
Digital Spy	4/5 stars

Chaka Demus is an extended play (EP) released by English singer-songwriter Jamie T on 31 August 2009. It is Jamie T's second release of 2009, following his critically acclaimed Sticks 'n' Stones EP in June. The titular song is also the sixth track on his second album Kings & Queens, which was released precisely one week later on 7 September 2009.

== Background ==
Jamie T told The Daily Telegraph that "Chaka Demus" was so named because, in its early stages of construction, it superficially sounded to him like Chaka Demus & Pliers. The single interpolates the theme song from The Banana Splits, a.k.a. "The Tra La La Song (One Banana, Two Banana)" throughout. In his interview article with The Sunday Times, journalist Dan Cairns compared the intro to Wings.

English reggae singer Hollie Cook, daughter of Sex Pistols drummer Paul Cook, was a collaborator on the EP, serving as lead vocalist alongside Jamie T on the tropical rock song "Forget Me Not (The Love I Knew Before I Grew)", in addition to providing background vocals on the folk baroque track, "Planning Spontaneity". The fourth and final song on the EP is the lo-fi "When They Are Gone (For Tim)".

== Music video ==
The video for "Chaka Demus" was directed by Dan Henshaw and Julian Fletcher, and was inspired by the film, The Cannonball Run (1981). Jamie T is shown singing from the backseat of a speeding car with a large suitcase, as an array of quirky characters are in pursuit. In the UK and Ireland, the video was first released online exclusively on MUZU.TV on 14 August; then subsequently across all platforms on 17 August.

== Critical reception ==
Both the EP and the single itself received mostly positive reviews from critics, who praised its eclecticism. Andrew Perry from The Daily Telegraph lauded it as "catchy, funny, and edgy in equal measure". Jessica Lewis of Exclaim! also favored the song in her album review, complimenting its "great drum and keyboard pairing".

Alex Fletcher at Digital Spy rated the EP 4 out of 5 stars; regarding "Chaka Demus", he stated that Jamie T's "boisterous indie-rap…veers between [the] frantically politicised and scruffy guitar-jangling", albeit all with "a newly spruced-up melodic edge". While not evoking Chaka Demus & Pliers completely, Fletcher says this composition makes him "worthy of mainstream attention".

Brianna Saraceno from Drowned in Sound praised "Chaka Demus" in her review, albeit noting its various incarnations with her preference being the album's incarnation. She described the tune as catchy with a "jubilant guitar line" and how it's "the simplicity of Jamie's lyrics" that render them so potent.

Conversely, Dan Raper at PopMatters offered a mixed perspective, saying that it "chugs along on video game synths until it degenerates into '70s-style soft-pop" (in an otherwise negative review). Meanwhile, Ash Akhtar at The Line of Best Fit commented that the title track "has a chorus like an old Motown song" in his slightly lukewarm review of the Kings & Queens album.

== Track listing ==
All lyrics are written by Jamie Alexander Treays, unless otherwise indicated.

Chaka Demus track listing
No.	Title	Writer(s)	Producer(s)	Length
1.	"Chaka Demus"	Jamie Treays^{[a]}	Jamie T; Jason Cox; James Dring; Tom Elmhirst^{[b]}	3:36
2.	"Forget Me Not (The Love I Knew Before I Grew)" (feat. Hollie Cook^{[c]})	Jamie T; Ben "Bones" Coupland	Jamie T; Bones; Greg "Wizard" Fleming^{[b]}	4:36
3.	"Planning Spontaneity"	Treays	Jamie T; Bones; Wizard^{[b]}	3:55
4.	"When They Are Gone (For Tim)"	Treays	Jamie T; Bones; Wizard^{[b]}	3:27
Total length:				15:34

Notes:

- ^{^[a]} "Chaka Demus" interpolates "The Tra La La Song (One Banana, Two Banana)"—the theme song from the 1960s children's variety television series, The Banana Splits—throughout its melody.
- ^{^[b]} Indicates an additional mixing engineer/producer.
- ^{^[c]} Cook also contributed background vocals to track #3, "Planning Spontaneity".

== Chart history ==
Weekly chart (2009)^{[d]}	Peak position
UK Singles (Official Charts)	23
UK Singles Downloads (Official Charts)	34

Notes:

- ^{^[d]} The EP also peaked at #8 for physical sales, and remained amongst the Top 100 for eight weeks.
