= Interpolation (popular music) =

Rerecording music to use in another recording

In popular music, interpolation is the recreation of a musical element, such as a melody or lyric, in a new composition. Unlike sampling, which is the reuse of a sound recording, interpolation involves the creation of a new recording.

== Licensing ==
Song compositions and recordings are treated separately under U.S. copyright law. Interpolation requires new permission from the copyright owner of the song composition, and interpolations are not authorized under a compulsory mechanical license under U.S. copyright law. Interpolations do not require permission from the copyright owner(s) of other sound recordings of the song composition, unless the sound recording is also sampled. Interpolating includes altering constituent components of a song composition, such as lyrics or melody, or otherwise reinterpreting the material. Acts have employed musicians and producers to recreate samples for this purpose. The Independent cited interpolation as an example of how copyright law influences creative processes.

== Examples ==
Examples of interpolation in popular music include "Wild Thoughts" (2017) by DJ Khaled, which interpolates "Maria Maria" (1999) by Santana, and "Gangsta's Paradise" (1995) by Coolio, which interpolates "Pastime Paradise" (1976) by Stevie Wonder. "2002" (2018) by Anne-Marie interpolates lyrics from several hit songs between 1998 and 2003 by acts including Jay-Z, NSync and Britney Spears. In 2019, Rolling Stone wrote that "blatant lyrical or melodic callbacks" were popular in pop music.

Examples include Portugal. The Man's "Feel It Still" which interpolates the Marvelettes' 1961 hit "Please Mr. Postman"; "Bad Liar" by Selena Gomez which interpolates the bassline of "Psycho Killer" by new wave band Talking Heads; and Ariana Grande's 2019 single "7 Rings" which interpolates "My Favorite Things" written by Rodgers & Hammerstein and made famous by Julie Andrews.

The 2004 Eric Prydz song "Call on Me" is based on a replayed sample of the 1982 Steve Winwood song "Valerie". Winwood rerecorded his "Valerie" vocals, and the instrumental was recreated by the company Replay Heaven, which recreates samples to simplify licensing.

== Creative implications ==
Interpolation became particularly popular in the late 1990s, when many hip hop and R&B producers began interpolating hooks from soul, funk, and pop records rather than sampling them, "cementing interpolation as a creative tool in music production".

The Independent critic Timothy McKenry wrote that interpolation has "higher cultural capital" than covers, which historically are motivated by commercial accessibility. He wrote that "artists who interpolate go beyond reproducing to create a new work that operates in dialogue with the past". In The Guardian, Rachel Aroesti argued that "in a world where practically every new track feels like a haunted house beset by ghosts of melodies past, deliberately evoking another song seems like the audacious and self-aware thing to do". She cited "Blue Lights" (2016) by Jorja Smith, which interpolates "Sirens" (2007) by Dizzee Rascal, and "5050" by Ray BLK, which interpolates "Lovefool" (1996) by the Cardigans, as examples of interpolation that "enrich songs with ... emotion and nostalgia".

In a 2022 Guardian article, Oliver Keens wrote that interpolation poses an ethical question as, unlike sampling, the owner of the recording is not paid. He asked: "Is it right that major labels enable a process that curbs incomes to songwriters, singers and musicians whose talent is clearly still in demand?" He connected it to a wider pattern in electronic dance music whereby white acts benefit from the artistry of black musicians.

== See also ==
- List of interpolated songs
- Cover version
- Interpolation (classical music)
- Musical quotation
