= Jamie T =

English musician (born 1986)

- Jamie T in 2022

Background information
- Born: Jamie Alexander Treays; Wimbledon, South London, England
- Genres: Indie rock; post-punk revival; alternative rock; hip hop; folk
- Occupations: Singer; songwriter; musician; rapper; record producer
- Instruments: Vocals; guitar; bass guitar; piano; drums
- Years active: 2005–present
- Labels: Pacemaker; Virgin; Epitaph; Polydor
- Website: www.jamie-t.com

Jamie Alexander Treays, better known by his stage name Jamie T, is an English singer, songwriter, rapper, guitarist and record producer from Wimbledon, South London.

Jamie T released his debut album, Panic Prevention, in 2007, and his second studio album, Kings and Queens, in 2009. In 2014, he released his third studio album, Carry on the Grudge, followed by a fourth studio album, Trick, in 2016. In 2018, he released B Sides (06-17), which was a compilation album of B-Sides from 2006 to 2017. He released his fifth studio album, The Theory of Whatever, in July 2022. His sixth studio album, Ghosts (100 Days of Morning), was released in October 2026.

== Early life and education ==
Jamie T was born Jamie Alexander Treays. He was privately educated at Reed's School leaving at 16 to study at a local sixth form college.

Whilst growing up, Jamie T suffered from panic attacks, hence the name of his debut album, Panic Prevention.

== Career ==
Zane Lowe made "Salvador" his single of the week and "Back in the Game" his Hottest Record in the World. On John Tweddle's show, "Back in the Game" featured as his "Pet Sound" and his single "Sheila" was Jo Whiley's Record of the Week. "Sheila" was also playlisted by BBC Radio 1 thus receiving more airtime across all shows.

"Sheila" was released on 29 July 2006. Two videos were made for the song; the first video in 2006 consisted of monkeys living in a house and short clips of Jamie T singing, while the second video in 2007 features actor Bob Hoskins walking along the River Thames lip synching to the lyrics. On 16 October 2006, Jamie T released his anthemic tune, "If You Got the Money" which reached No. 13 in the charts. His next single "Calm Down Dearest" was released in the UK on 15 January 2007 and reached number nine, his first top 10 hit.

=== Panic Prevention (2007) ===
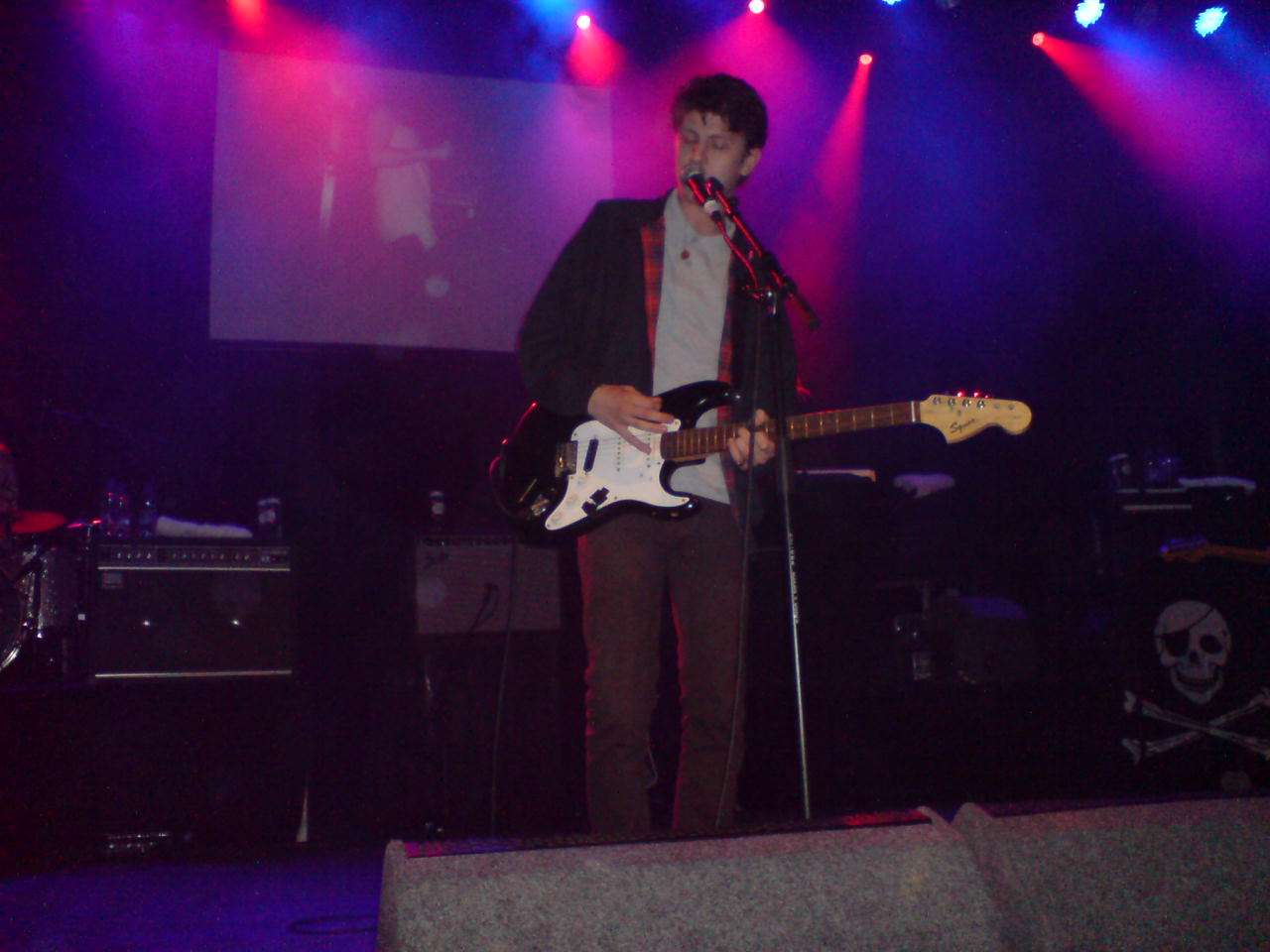
Jamie T live at ABC Glasgow in 2007

His debut album Panic Prevention was then released on 29 January 2007. Lily Allen provided backing vocals on the song "Rawhide" the B-side to the re-release of "Sheila" on 7 May 2007.

He performed on the Main Stage on 19 May 2007 in Preston for Radio 1's Big Weekend. He also performed at Glastonbury 2007, Benicàssim 2007, Oxegen 2007 (8 July) where he performed at the green room, and Carling Weekend Leeds 2007. He played the 2008 V Festival at the JJB Champion ARENA.

In September 2007, Jamie T did a US tour and made his US television debut on Last Call with Carson Daly performing "Sheila". He also did an iTunes Session EP.

=== "Fire Fire" and "Sticks 'n' Stones" (2009) ===
On 12 January 2009, a music video appeared on Jamie's website for a new song, "Fire Fire", which he explained would not be released as a single nor would it be on the new album.

21 May 2009 saw the release of the official video for his single "Sticks 'n' Stones". On 29 June 2009, Jamie released "Sticks 'n' Stones", the first single from his second album Kings and Queens, as an extended play with three other tracks, "St. Christopher", "On the Green" and "The Dance of the Young Professionals". "Sticks 'n' Stones" reached No. 15 in the UK singles chart. The song also reached number 14 for 2009 songs on the annual Triple J Hottest 100.

=== Chaka Demus EP (2009) ===
On 31 August 2009, he released a further EP, the "Chaka Demus EP" which includes the second single taken from Kings & Queens, also called "Chaka Demus". This features three other songs: "Forget Me Not (The Love I Knew Before I Grew)", "Planning Spontaneity" and "When They Are Gone (For Tim)".

=== Kings and Queens' (2009) ===
A week later, on 7 September, second album Kings and Queens was released. This features 11 tracks (plus bonus track "The Curious Sound" featuring Ben Bones, when downloaded from iTunes). Jamie has said that his favourite song in this album is "Emily's Heart" because it reminds him of Emily Evans (a former girlfriend.) Talking about Kings & Queens, Jamie said "I didn't do my second album. I did my third one instead."

Kings & Queens reached No. 2 in the UK Albums chart. After its release Zane Lowe, on his BBC Radio 1 show, declared Kings & Queens his favourite album of 2009, describing the album as "a brilliant, poignant, incredible observational record" and "flawless".

On 25 September 2009, Jamie cancelled his Australian tour, due to laryngitis. Six days later, he postponed the first six shows of his sellout UK tour. A week later, however, Jamie cancelled the entire UK and European tours. A statement on his website informs that all Australia, UK and Europe scheduled shows were cancelled and since then, all three tours were rescheduled.

=== The Man's Machine (2009) ===
On 26 October, Jamie announced he would be releasing a third EP from the album, The Man's Machine. The four-track EP will consist of "The Man's Machine", "Jenny Can Rely on Me", "Man Not a Monster" and "Believing in Things That Can't Be Done". The Man's Machine EP was released on CD and 12" vinyl on 23 November 2009.

A re-recorded version of "Emily's Heart" premiered as Zane Lowe's Hottest Record In The World on 19 January 2010, and it was confirmed as the next single, with a cover of Bruce Springsteen's "Atlantic City" serving as the B-side. It was released on 15 March.

On 24 June 2010, Jamie T performed material from the Kings & Queens album at the Engine Shed in Lincoln as a warm-up to his tour. A day later he played the 02 Academy in Liverpool. He then headlined the John Peel Stage at Glastonbury Festival on 26 June 2010.

=== Carry on the Grudge and Magnolia Melancholia EP (2014–15) ===
Jamie T played his first gigs for four years in July 2014 at in Glasgow, Liverpool and Portsmouth. Around the same time a new single, "Don't You Find", made its debut on BBC Radio 1, chosen by Zane Lowe as his "Hottest Record in the World". In September 2014 his third album, entitled Carry on the Grudge, was released.

In April 2015, Jamie T released the EP Magnolia Melancholia, which features the album track 'Don't You Find' and five new tracks. He performed at Glastonbury Festival on 28 June on the 'Other Stage'. He supported Blur for their short Australian tour in July 2015, with dates in Sydney, Melbourne and Perth, as well as playing at Splendour in the Grass on 26 July. He also played various other festivals such as T in the Park and Melt! Festival before wrapping up the Carry on the Grudge tour at Reading and Leeds Festivals on 30 August.

=== Trick (2016–2021) ===
In July 2016 it was announced that the new album Trick was slated for a 2 September release. The 12-track album was recorded in London and Detroit and preceded by the single "Tinfoil Boy". A UK tour in September and October followed the release, including three dates at Brixton Academy.

=== The Theory of Whatever (2022–2026) ===
On 27 April, Jamie T announced his new album The Theory of Whatever and that it would release on 22 July 2022. it was preceded by the singles The Old Style Raiders, St. George Wharf Tower and Between the Rocks. The Theory of Whatever became Jamie's first number-one album.

=== Ghosts (100 Days of Morning) (2026) ===
On 9 October 2026 Ghosts (100 Days of Morning) was released on the label Polydor. It is available on CD, LP, cassette, digital download, streaming.

== Awards ==
Jamie T won the Best Solo Artist at the 2007 Shockwave NME Awards.

On 17 July 2007, Jamie T's debut album Panic Prevention was shortlisted as one of the 12 nominees for the Mercury Prize. Panic Prevention was often included in the 'best albums of the decade' lists, including: No. 13 out of 50 in Observer Music Monthly and No. 53 out of 100 in NME.

He won the Best Solo Artist award at the 2007 and 2010 NME Awards. In 2015 he was awarded a further three accolades by NME, including Best Song for "Zombie".

== Artistry ==
=== Musical style ===
He has been nicknamed "one man Arctic Monkey". Canvas magazine has described him as "like the bastard lovechild of Billy Bragg and Mike Skinner doing his best Joe Strummer impression".

== Discography ==
- Panic Prevention (2007)
- Kings & Queens (2009)
- Carry on the Grudge (2014)
- Trick (2016)
- The Theory of Whatever (2022)
- Ghosts (100 Days of Morning) (2026)
