= The Maccabees discography =

Band discography

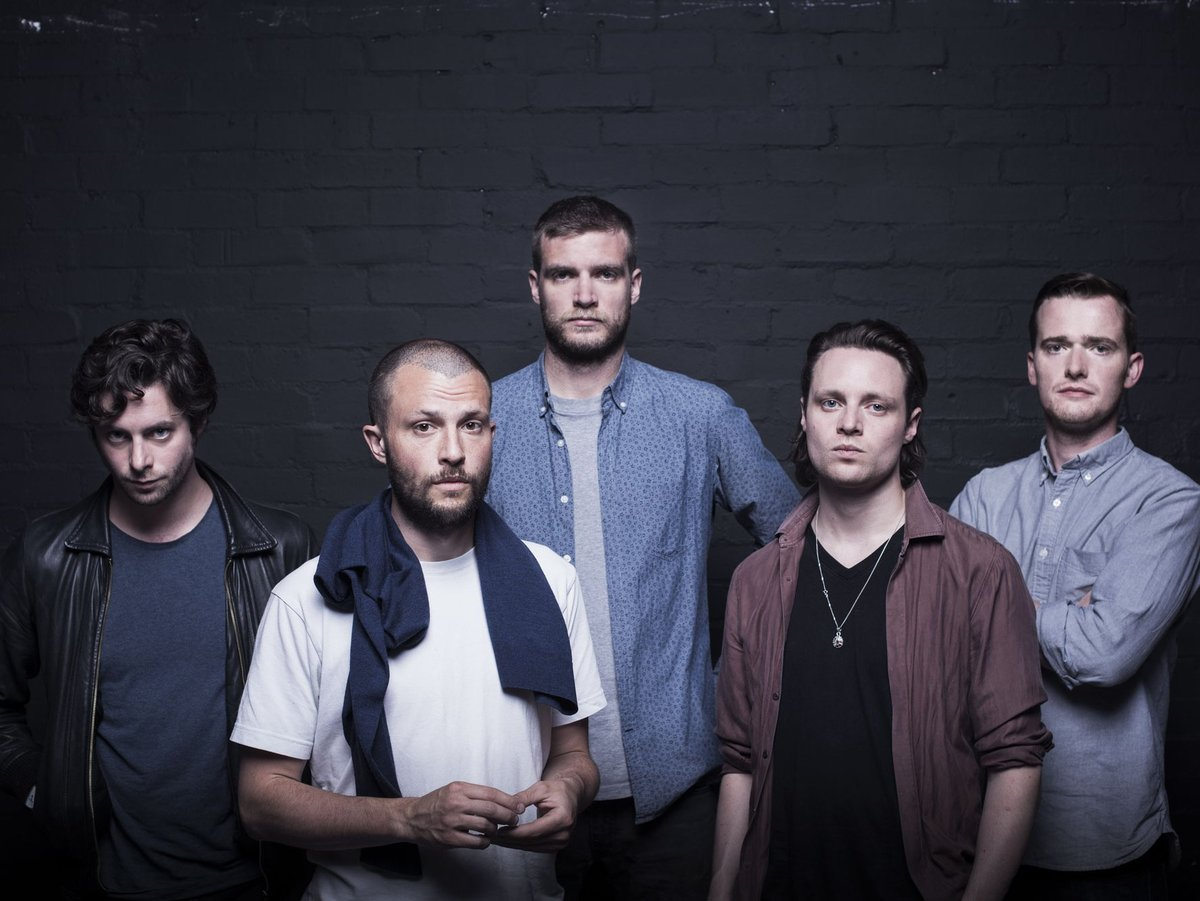
- Studio albums: 4
- Extended plays: 2
- Singles: 11

English indie rock band the Maccabees released four studio albums, two extended plays, and eleven singles from 2004 until their disbandment in 2017.

== Albums ==
=== Studio albums ===
List of albums, with selected chart positions, sales, and certifications
Title	Album details	Peak chart positions								Certifications
Title	Album details	UK	AUS	BEL (FL)	BEL (WA)	IRE	NL	SCO	SWI	Certifications
Colour It In	Released: 14 May 2007; Label: Fiction; Format: CD, digital download	24	—	—	—	—	—	41	—	BPI: Gold
Wall of Arms	Released: 4 May 2009; Label: Fiction; Format: LP, CD, digital download	13	—	—	—	65	—	23	—	BPI: Silver
Given to the Wild	Released: 9 January 2012; Label: Fiction; Format: 2×LP, CD, digital download	4	— (Note: Given to the Wild did not enter the Australian ARIA Albums Chart but peaked at number four on the ARIA Hitseekers Chart.)	92	—	31	57	8	—	BPI: Gold
Marks to Prove It	Released: 31 July 2015; Label: Fiction; Format: LP, CD, digital download	1	97	91	142	25	23	1	100	BPI: Silver
"—" denotes a recording that did not chart or was not released in that territory.

== EPs ==
Title	EP details
You Make Noise, I Make Sandwiches	Released: August 2004; Label: Haircut Records
Toothpaste Kisses	Released: 10 October 2007; Label: Fiction Records

== Singles ==
Title	Year	Peak chart positions						Certifications	Album
Title	Year	UK	UK Indie	BEL (FL)	MEX	NL	SCO	Certifications	Album
"X-Ray"	2005	147	14	—	—	—	91		Colour It In
"Latchmere"	2006	—	—	—	—	—	—		Colour It In
"First Love"	2006	40	—	—	—	—	38		Colour It In
"About Your Dress"	2007	33	—	—	—	—	24		Colour It In
"Precious Time"	2007	49	—	—	—	—	25		Colour It In
"Toothpaste Kisses"	2008	70	—	—	—	—	24	BPI: Gold	Colour It In
"No Kind Words" (Note: "No Kind Words" was released as a free download.)	2009	—	—	—	15	—	—		Wall of Arms
"Love You Better"	2009	36	—	—	—	—	4		Wall of Arms
"Can You Give It?"	2009	129	—	—	—	—	15		Wall of Arms
"Empty Vessels"	2009	— (Note: "Empty Vessels" did not enter the UK Singles Chart, but peaked at number 36 on the UK Physical Singles Chart Top 100.)	—	—	—	—	—		Wall of Arms
"Pelican"	2011	75	—	130	23	99	80	BPI: Silver	Given to the Wild
"Feel to Follow"	2012	188	—	130	36	—	—		Given to the Wild
"Went Away"	2012	— (Note: "Went Away" did not enter the UK Singles Chart, but peaked at number 27 on the UK Physical Singles Chart Top 100.)	—	—	—	—	—		Given to the Wild
"Ayla"	2012	— (Note: "Ayla" did not enter the UK Singles Chart, but peaked at number 13 on the UK Physical Singles Chart Top 100.)	—	—	42	—	—		Given to the Wild
"Marks to Prove It"	2015	—	—	—	—	—	—		Marks to Prove It
"Something Like Happiness"	2015	—	—	—	—	—	—		Marks to Prove It
"Spit It Out"	2015	—	—	—	—	—	—		Marks to Prove It
"—" denotes a recording that did not chart or was not released in that territory.
