= Cenzo Townshend =

English record producer

- Born: Vincenzo Capellini Townshend; 25 March 1963 (age 63)
- Genres: Rock; pop; indie rock; indie pop
- Occupations: Mixer; audio engineer

Vincenzo "Cenzo" Capellini Townshend (born 25 March 1963) is an English record producer, mixer, and audio engineer, and has worked with artists and bands including the Rolling Stones, a-ha, Kaiser Chiefs, U2, Snow Patrol, Florence + the Machine, Jamie T, Friendly Fires, Bloc Party, Franz Ferdinand, the Maccabees, Jamie Cullum, Mystery Jets, Sophie Ellis-Bextor, and Thirty Seconds to Mars. Townshend was awarded 'Mix Engineer of the Year' for two successive years by the Music Producers Guild Awards in 2009 and 2010, and nominated again in 2016, 2017 and 2018.

== Early life ==
He is the only child of Antonio Capellini and Lady Carolyn Townshend, the eldest daughter of George Townshend, 7th Marquess Townshend. After his parents divorced in 1971, his mother remarried to Edgar Bronfman Sr. in 1973, but they separated after only 10 days and the marriage was annulled in 1974.

Townshend was educated at Milton Abbey School in Dorset.

== Career ==
Townshend began his career by working at Trident Studios in London in the late 1980s, eventually working as an assistant engineer for Alan Moulder and Mark 'Spike' Stent. Following this, Townshend worked independently with producer Ian Broudie for 8 years and then joined producer Stephen Street at The Bunker in Olympic Studios in London where he maintained residency until its closure in 2009.

As of 2012, Townshend mixed from his Decoy Studios in Woodbridge Suffolk.

== Selected discography (mixing) ==
Cenzo Townshend discography
Year	Artist	Album	Song(s)
2024	DI-RECT	Sphinx	
2023	Sophie Ellis-Bextor	Hana	
2020	DI-RECT	Wild Hearts	
2020	Sea Girls	Open Up Your Head	
2020	Oh Wonder	No One Else Can Wear Your Crown	
2019	DI-RECT	Nothing To Lose (EP)	
2019	The Rolling Stones	Honk	"Living in a Ghost Town"
2019	Keane	Cause and Effect	
2019	The Specials	Encore	
2017	Everything Everything	A Fever Dream	
2017	Rat Boy	SCUM	
2017	Maxïmo Park	Risk to Exist	
2017	You Me At Six	Night People	"Take on the World"
2017	Amy Macdonald	Under Stars	
2017	James Blunt	The Afterlove	Make Me Better
2016	The Courteeners	Mapping the Rendezvous	
2016	Passenger	Young as the Morning, Old as the Sea	
2016	Sophie Ellis-Bextor	Familia	
2016	Jake Bugg	On My One	
2016	Suede	Night Thoughts	
2016	Kaiser Chiefs	Stay Together	various
2016	The Feeling	The Feeling	
2015	Nothing but Thieves	Nothing but Thieves	various
2015	a-ha	Cast in Steel	"Cast in Steel" "Mythomania" "She's Humming A Tune" "Giving Up The Ghost" "The End Of The Affair"(only included in bonus disc)
2015	The Maccabees	Marks to Prove It	
2015	Everything Everything	Get to Heaven	various
2015	SOAK	Before We Forgot How to Dream	"Sea Creatures" "B a noBody"
2015	All We Are	All We Are	various
2015	Rhodes	Wishes	
2015	FFS	FFS	various
2014	George Ezra	Wanted on Voyage	
2014	Jamie T	Carry on the Grudge	
2014	Jungle	(Single)	"Time"
2014	Port Isla	(Single)	"In The Long Run"
2014	Foxes	Glorious	
2014	Sivu	Something On High	various
2014	The Family Rain	Under the Volcano	
2014	Dotan	7 Layers	
2014	Ward Thomas	(Single)	"Push For The Stride"
2014	Passenger	Whispers	(Single)
2013	Tom Odell	Long Way Down	tracks
2013	Lissie	Back to Forever	
2013	Together Pangea	Badillac	
2013	Skaters	Manhattan	
2013	Devlin	A Moving Picture	tracks
2012	The Vaccines	Come of Age	
2012	Kensington	Vultures	
2012	Tom Jones	Spirit in the Room	"Hit or Miss"
2012	Miles Kane	First of My Kind	
2012	Sharon Van Etten	Tramp	(Single)
2012	King Charles	LoveBlood	
2012	Kaiser Chiefs	Start the Revolution Without Me	
2012	Paper Route	The Peace of Wild Things	
2012	The Maccabees	Given to the Wild	
2012	Snow Patrol	Fallen Empires	Various
2012	Kate Miller-Heidke	Nightflight	
2011	Ben Howard	Every Kingdom	"The Fear", "Diamonds" & "Keep Your Head Up"
2011	Alex Winston	Velvet Elvis EP	
2011	Eskimo Joe	Ghosts of the Past	
2011	Crystal Castles	Crystal Castles II	"Not In Love" (Ft. Robert Smith)
2011	Guillemots	Walk the River	"I Must Be A Lover"
2011	Patrick Wolf	Lupercalia	
2011	Friendly Fires	Pala	
2011	The Feeling	Together We Were Made	
2011	The Horrors	Skying	"Changing the Rain"
2010	Zebra & Giraffe	The Inside	
2010	Bryan Ferry	Every Kingdom	
2010	Devlin	Bud, Sweat and Beers	
2010	Grinderman	(Single)	"Palaces of Montezuma"
2010	Detroit Social Club	Existence	
2010	Tom Jones	Praise & Blame	"Did Trouble Me"
2010	Yeasayer	(Single)	"Madder Red"
2010	Jamie Cullum	The Pursuit	"Don't Stop the Music"
2010	Corinne Bailey Rae	The Sea	"Paris Nights/New York Mornings"
2009	Thirty Seconds to Mars	This Is War	
2009	Starsailor	All the Plans	
2009	Florence + The Machine	Lungs	
2009	Hockey	(Single)	"Too Fake"
2009	U2	No Line on the Horizon	Various
2009	Franz Ferdinand	Tonight	
2009	Jamie T	Kings & Queens	"various"
2009	Ida Maria	Fortress Round My Heart	
2009	Editors	In This Light and on This Evening	
2009	Late Of The Pier	Fantasy Black Channel	
2008	Snow Patrol	A Hundred Million Suns	
2008	Elbow	(Single)	"One Day Like This"
2008	Infadels	(Single)	"Make Mistakes"
2008	Infadels	(Single)	"Free Things For Poor People"
2008	Primal Scream	Beautiful Future	"Beautiful Future" & "Can't Go Back"
2007	The Maccabees	Colour It In	"Toothpaste Kisses"
2007	Jamie T	Panic Prevention	"various"
2007	Peter Bjorn and John	Writer's Block	"Young Folks" ft. Victoria Bergsman
2007	Kaiser Chiefs	Yours Truly, Angry Mob	
2007	Athlete	Beyond the Neighbourhood	
2007	Babyshambles	Shotter's Nation	
2007	Bloc Party	A Weekend in the City	
2007	Editors	An End Has a Start	
2007	Interpol	Our Love to Admire	"No I In Threesome"
2007	The Maccabees	Colour It In	"About Your Dress"
2007	Mystery Jets	Diamonds in the Dark EP	
2006	The Zutons	Tired of Hanging Around	"Valeria"
2006	Snow Patrol	Eyes Open	
2006	Graham Coxon	(Single)	"What Ya Gonna Do Now?"
2006	Babyshambles	The Blinding EP	
2006	Mystery Jets	Floatsam and Jetsam EP	
2006	Graham Coxon	Love Travels at Illegal Speeds	
2006	Editors	The Back Room	
2005	New Order	Waiting for the Sirens' Call	
2005	Kaiser Chiefs	Employment	
