= Tailenders (podcast) =

BBC radio show and podcast about cricket

- Genre: Sports podcast
- Language: English

Cast and voices
- Hosted by: Greg James; Felix White; James Anderson

Production
- Production: Mark "Sharky" Sharman

Publication
- Original release: 15 November 2017
- Provider: BBC Sounds
- Updates: Ongoing

Related
- Website: Tailenders BBC

Tailenders (also known as Trailfinders) is a podcast and sometime BBC Radio show which is nominally centered around the world of cricket. The show is presented by BBC Radio 1 DJ Greg James with Maccabees guitarist Felix White and former England international cricketer James Anderson. After its hundredth episode Esquire magazine called it "a phenomenon", and it has also been labelled "one of the most successful in the country", and "funny and entertaining" by The Guardian. It has been named in the podcasts of the week by The Week, and The Radio Times, as well as recommended in the i, and Time Out. The Times included Tailenders in their "25 best podcasts of 2022".

In 2019 the BBC announced 2.5 million listeners for Tailenders from its BBC Sounds App. In 2020, at the British Podcast Awards, the show was nominated for the Best Live Episode and was awarded "gold". At the 2020 Audio and Radio Industry Awards (ARIAS), the show won the bronze award for Best Sports Show.

The show is made with help from producer Mark "Sharky" Sharman (AKA Sharknado the Movie), and regular input from Bristolian Matt "Mattchin" Horan (nicknamed ‘Mattchin’ due to his relation by marriage to Indian cricketing great Sachin Tendulkar). Horan, much to the delight of the worldwide Tailenders community, was named the 38th coolest person in Bristol in 2020, climbing up to 11th spot in 2021. This is purported to be one of Horan's proudest achievements, and he called it "huge news".

The podcast has spawned live performances at places such as the Hackney Empire (Jack Leach Empire) and The Palace Theatre and catchphrases such as "Go Well", "Cheers", "#tailendersoftheworlduniteandtakeover" and "bit spicy that".

Through the podcast, a charity foundation - the Go Well Fund - was created to raise money during the COVID-19 pandemic.

In March 2024, the Tailenders were joined by Stuart Broad and Isa Guha to deliver the Cowdrey Lecture for the Marylebone Cricket Club.
