= Can You Give It? =

Single by The Maccabees

from the album Wall of Arms
- Released: 5 July 2009
- Recorded: 2009
- Genre: Indie
- Length: 2:56
- Label: Polydor
- Songwriter(s): Rupert Jarvis, Orlando Weeks, Hugo White, Felix White

The Maccabees singles chronology
"Love You Better" (2009)	"Can You Give It?" (2009)	"Empty Vessels" (2009)

"Can You Give It?" is a song from English Indie Rock band The Maccabees, released as the second single from their second album Wall of Arms on 5 July 2009. The song peaked at number 129 on the UK Singles Chart.

== Music video ==
A music video to accompany the release of "Can You Give It?" was first released onto YouTube on 4 June 2009 at a total length of three minutes and nineteen seconds.

== Track listing ==
Digital download
No.	Title	Length
1.	"Can You Give It" (Single Version)	2:56
2.	"Can You Give It" (Dodworth Colliery M.W. Brass Band Rendition)	2:49
3.	"Young Lions" (Dodworth Colliery M.W. Brass Band Rendition)	3:23
4.	"No Kind Words" (Dan Le Sac's Sucked in Remix)	4:43

== Charts ==
Chart 2009)	Peak position
UK Singles (The Official Charts Company)	129

== Release history ==
Region	Date	Format	Label
United Kingdom	5 July 2009	Digital download	Polydor Records
