= Love You Better =

Love You Better may refer to:

- "Love You Better" (Future song), 2022
- "Love You Better" (The Maccabees song), 2009
- "Love You Better" (Oh Land song), 2013
- "Love You Better", a song by Olly Murs from the 2018 album You Know I Know

== See also ==
- "Love U Better", a song by Ty Dolla Sign
- "Luv U Better", a song by LL Cool J
