= Zebra & Giraffe =

South African alternative rock band

- Origin: Johannesburg, South Africa
- Genres: Alternative Rock, Electronic Rock
- Years active: 2007-2016
- Members: Greg Carlin; Alan Shenton; Mike Wright Chris Carlton; Stefan Henrico

Zebra & Giraffe (abbreviated to Z & G) is an alternative rock band from South Africa. The band's debut album, Collected Memories, was released on 5 May 2008.

== History ==
=== Greg Carlin ===
Carlin grew up in Midrand, a suburb inside Johannesburg, South Africa where he attended Irene Primary School before progressing to high school at Midrand High School, which he graduated from in 1999. Carlin first realised his passion for music after receiving a drum kit as a gift at the age of twelve. While at school, Carlin played in a short-lived band called MSG (1997–1999) – the name of an additive found in food products they took off a chip packet. After school, he went on to study Fine Arts at South African university Tuks from 2001 to 2004, and also completed his honours degree, though he did not pursue fine art further.

During his time at university, Carlin took singing lessons for several months and bought tutorial CDs from the US. While at university, Carlin was the bassist and vocalist for the band White Lie (2004–2005), a side project of the punk band Remedy. In spite of a radio hit called "Runaway", the band's run was brief and they broke up because the other band members wanted to focus on their university studies, the band was going nowhere anyway, so Greg called it a day. After varsity, Carlin decided to travel and on his return worked intermittently as a contractor at Standard Bank during 2005 to 2007. He taught himself the guitar (his favourite instrument), as well as piano/keyboard, bass and drums (the only instrument he was ever trained in).

Carlin was, for a while, an employee of record label, Just Music, where he handled the digital side of the business. He approached the head of the label, Karl Anderson, with a demo of his work and was offered a record deal.

=== Collected Memories and The Knife EP ===
Carlin produced the band's debut album, Collected Memories, with Darryl Torr from Dear Reader & Harris Tweed. The album was released on 5 May 2008. Nils van der Linden of Iafrica.com described the album as "the kind of slick but dark electro rock you'd expect a fan of New Order and Joy Division to make".

"The Knife" was chosen as the album's first single, and Carlin enlisted South African cinematographer Rob Malpage and producer Warwick Allan to make the music video. Warwick had a concept for the video, but had not heard the song; they soon got together and adapted the concept to suit the song. The Knife was #1 for 3 weeks on the Hi5@5 on 5FM and was also #1 for 5 weeks on the PUKFM charts. It went to #1 on other South African campus stations. The video was #1 for a couple of weeks on the MK Top10 music videos in South Africa. The release of the album and the national success of "The Knife" meant the band were "causing quite a stir" according to Music Industry Online.

At this point, Carlin needed to find additional members in order to enable the band to perform live. Though he was reluctant to assemble a touring group, he recruited Alan Shenton (guitar), Andrew Maskell (bass), Rob Davidson (keyboards) and Darren Leader (drums). "Arm Yourself", the second single from Collected Memories, as well as its music video (again directed by Allan) was released in August 2008. The third single released by Z&G is the hit "Oxymoron," for which an HD stop motion video was shot by the bands still photographer, Marcus Maschwitz and directed & edited by band members, Greg Carlin and Alan Shenton. In January 2009 they released "Running Faster," followed by "In My Eyes," "Fight! Fight! Fight!" and "Pariahs." In total, 'Collected Memories' produced 7 Top 10 singles and achieved numerous # 1's on the biggest National and College Radio stations around South Africa.

In May 2010, Zebra & Giraffe launched their first International release – a 5 Track EP called 'The Knife'. The EP, which features selected tracks from their debut 'Collected Memories', was mixed in London at Metropolis Studios by the acclaimed producer / mixer Cenzo Townshend. Townshend is famous for his work with bands like Editors, Florence and The Machine, Snow Patrol and U2. 'The Knife' EP includes the singles – 'Oxymoron', (mixed by Ken Lewis) 'The Knife', 'In My Eyes', 'Arm Yourself' and 'Fight! Fight! Fight!’, and was released internationally in May 2010.

=== The Inside ===
Zebra & Giraffe released their 2nd LP in South Africa on 27 September 2010. Production began on this album in May of the same year. The majority of the album was recorded at RBF Studios in Johannesburg. The album was once again produced by Darryl Torr, and this time around mixed by Cenzo Townshend. Three different versions of the album will be released on the same date. A standard edition, a deluxe edition with a DVD documentary on the 'making of The Inside' album & video, and a 3rd edition with the Knife EP attached, also mixed by Cenzo Townshend. The album was written by Greg Carlin, Alan Shenton, and Darren Leader. Once again, Warwick Allan was recruited to direct & edit a video for the title track "The Inside."

The supported the release of "The Inside" around South Africa in October 2010. They visited: Johannesburg, Pretoria, Durban, Bloemfontein, East London, Port Elizabeth, Grahamstown, Knysna, Stellenbosch, and finished up in Cape Town.

=== The Wisest Ones ===
In November 2011, Zebra & Giraffe went into studio as a three-piece (Greg Carlin, Alan Shenton, Mike Wright) with Grammy Award-winning producer-engineer Darryl Torr at his recording facility in Greenside, Johannesburg. The sessions comprised seven weeks in total, split over a period of six months. The album, entitled The Wisest Ones, was mixed by Will Brierre and Mark Needham in Los Angeles and was released in South Africa in July 2012.

=== Knuckles EP ===
In preparation for the release of their second extended play, Zebra & Giraffe launched the "Unplugged" tour, playing "stripped down" versions of songs off their previous three albums during July 2014.

On 6 August 2014, the band released the first single off the new EP, "I've Been Bad", and revealed the title of their: "Knuckles". The single was released with music video, which was directed by Ross Garrett and produced by Cat Lindsay and Grant Risseeuw for Velocity Films. The song was released for download via iTunes.

On 21 August 2014, the band announced tour dates for their South African "Knuckles" launch tour.

On 15 September 2014, "Knuckles" was officially released worldwide via iTunes. The EP topped at number one on the South African iTunes store's Alternative album chart.

=== Live performances ===
In August and September 2008, Z&G played with pop folk band Dear Reader (formerly known as Harris Tweed) on a nationwide tour, "O' The Places You’ll Go". The tour encompassed performances in various South African cities including Pretoria (Tshwane), Johannesburg, Stellenbosch, Cape Town, George, Knysna, Port Elizabeth, East London and Durban. The band played at the 2009 Coke Zero Festival, a music festival that took place in Johannesburg on 10 April 2009, and in Cape Town on 13 April 2009 with headliners Snow Patrol, Oasis, and Panic at the Disco. The 5-piece band travelled to Nairobi, Kenya, in August 2009 to perform at the MTV Africa Music Awards (MAMA's) where they performed with South African rapper, D.A LES, combining the hit singles "The Knife" and D.A LES's "Fire." In 2009 they supported indie rock band, The Killers on the South African leg of their Day & Age tour in Johannesburg on 3, 4 December 2009 and in Cape Town on 6 December 2009. Z&G supported the release of "The Inside" around South Africa in October 2010. In May 2011 the 5-piece travelled to Los Angeles to perform at Passport Approved's Muse Expo. In August 2011 the band embarked on a nationwide tour entitled "The Haal Asem Kwagga Toer" with fellow Afrikaans rockers Van Coke Kartel.

== Members ==
Greg Carlin (Vocal, Rhythm Guitar)

Alan Shenton (Lead Guitar)

Mike Wright (Drums)

Stefan Henrico (Bass)

== Awards ==
Year	Nominated work	Award	Result
2009	Band	MTV Africa Music Awards: Best Alternative	Won
2009	Collected Memories	South African Music Awards: Best Rock	Won
2011	The Inside	South African Music Awards: Best Rock	Nominated
2013	I'll Blame You	MK Music Awards: Best Video	Nominated
2013	I'll Blame You	MK Music Awards: Best Group	Nominated
2013	I'll Blame You	MK Music Awards: Best Rock	Nominated
2013	The Wisest Ones	South African Music Awards: Best Rock	Won

== Albums and EP's ==
Album information
Collected Memories
- Released: May 2008
- Format: CD, Digital download
The Knife EP
- Released: June 2010
- Format: Digital download
The Inside
- Released: September 2010
- Format: CD, Digital download
The Wisest Ones
- Release: 23 July 2012
- Format: CD, Digital download
Knuckles EP
- Release: 15 September 2014
- Format: Digital download
Slow Motion EP
- Release: December 2015
- Format: CD, Digital download
