= The Wisest Ones =

Studio album by Zebra & Giraffe
- Released: 23 July 2012
- Genre: Alternative rock
- Length: 47:11
- Label: Just Music

Zebra & Giraffe chronology
The Inside (2010)	The Wisest Ones (2012)

Singles from The Wisest Ones
- 1. "I'll Blame You " 2. "My Best "

The Wisest Ones is the third full-length album released by the alternative rock band Zebra & Giraffe.

== Reception ==
Professional ratings
Review scores
Source	Rating
Times Live	7/10 stars
Perdeby	8/10 stars
The Citizen	6/10 stars
Rolling Stone	3.5/5 stars

The Wisest Ones has mainly received positive reviews. The Times praised it as the album where the band defined its unique mixture of instruments, saying, "The Wisest Ones seems to have given Zebra & Giraffe a more consistent sound and now, with their three-piece set up of guitar icon Alan Shenton and madman Mike Wright, the band is ready to come into their own." Perdeby praises the depth of emotion, saying, "This is Carlin as you’ve never seen him before"

== Track listing ==
All tracks are written by Greg Carlin except where noted.

No.	Title	Length
1.	"All I Gave, Pt. 1"	2:38
2.	"All I Gave"	3:33
3.	"I'll Blame You"	3:30
4.	"My Best"	4:14
5.	"Sons"	3:45
6.	"Little Black Book"	3:38
7.	"Whores, Liars"	4:55
8.	"Yesterday"	3:48
9.	"Sick"	4:29
10.	"Denied"	4:50
11.	"Fire"	3:26
12.	"You're Nothing to Me"	4:25
Total length:		47:11
