= Pelican (song) =

Single by The Maccabees

from the album Given to the Wild
- Released: 30 December 2011
- Recorded: 2011
- Genre: Indie rock, post-punk revival
- Length: 3:44
- Label: Polydor
- Songwriter(s): Rupert Jarvis, Sam Doyle, Orlando Weeks, Hugo White, Felix White

The Maccabees singles chronology
"Empty Vessels" (2009)	"Pelican" (2011)	"Feel To Follow" (2012)

Music video
- "Pelican" on YouTube

"Pelican" is a song by English indie rock band The Maccabees. The track was released in the United Kingdom on 30 December 2011 as the lead single from the band's third studio album, Given to the Wild (2012) – where it debuted at number eighty-seven on the UK Singles Chart; peaking at number seventy-five a week later. The song was used for the soundtrack of 2012 racing video game Forza Horizon and the preview montage of Top Gear's nineteenth series on 27 January 2013.

== Background ==
"Pelican" received its first play on Zane Lowe's BBC Radio 1 show at 7.30pm on 15 November 2011. The song was chosen by Fearne Cotton as her Record of the Week.

== Music video ==
A music video to accompany the release of "Pelican" was first released onto YouTube on 13 December 2011 at a total length of three minutes and fifty-nine seconds. Directed by David Wilson, it features a black background with several objects and children's faces splitting in half as they approach the camera.

== Track listing ==
Digital download
No.	Title	Length
1.	"Pelican"	3:44

== Charts ==
Chart (2012)	Peak position
Belgium (Ultratip Bubbling Under Flanders)	80
Netherlands (Single Top 100)	99
UK Singles (The Official Charts Company)	75

== Release history ==
Region	Date	Format	Label
United Kingdom	30 December 2011	Digital Download	Polydor Records
