= Homesick (Sea Girls album) =

Studio album by Sea Girls
- Released: 18 March 2022
- Recorded: November 2020–April 2021
- Studio: Stustustudio (Brixton); Octagon (London); The Garage Topanga Canyon (Los Angeles)
- Genre: Indie rock
- Length: 40:20
- Label: Polydor
- Producer: Jonny Coffer; Larry Hibbitt; Jacknife Lee; Cass Lowe

Sea Girls chronology
Open Up Your Head (2020)	Homesick (2022)	The Hometown Tour Live (2023)

Singles from Homesick
- 1. "Sick" Released: 9 August 2021; 2. "Again Again" Released: 15 October 2021; 3. "Hometown" Released: 18 November 2021; 4. "Sleeping with You" Released: 21 January 2022; 5. "Lonely" Released: 15 February 2022

Professional ratings
Aggregate scores
Source	Rating
AnyDecentMusic?	7.4/10
Metacritic	72/100
Review scores
Source	Rating
CLASH	8/10
DORK	4/5 stars
Gigwise	7/10 stars
God Is in the TV	8/10
The Line of Best Fit	8/10
musicOMH	3.5/5 stars
NME	3/5 stars
PopMatters	7/10

Homesick is the second studio album by English indie rock band Sea Girls. It was released on 18 March 2022 under Polydor. It is the band's second album to chart at number three on the UK Albums Chart consecutively after their debut album, Open Up Your Head.

== Background and recording ==
During the early periods of the COVID-19 pandemic lockdown, the London-based Sea Girls members returned to their hometowns. Frontman and the band's chief songwriter Henry Camamile resided at his parents' house in Lincolnshire, where he "[...] thought a lot about mortality and dying – what it means to be alive and how lucky we are" which became the main inspiration for the album. It is also influenced by Camamile's personal breakdown of his breakup with an American ex-girlfriend. The album's title is derived from the word 'homesick' itself, which Camamile paraphrased as "it just means you belong somewhere. Even if you’re out on tour or whatever, you feel like you have somewhere you belong. I belong to my past and these stories, and we had a lot of time to think about it and push and be brave in what was written about."

The band mainly recorded the album remotely with their long-time collaborator Larry Hibbitt and Los Angeles-based producer Jacknife Lee, alongside other co-producers. They admitted that the distance and time zones that separated them from Lee in America were challenging. The band would often get a call at two in the morning to talk about the tracks. "[...] there was a lot of us recording through the day and sending it to Jacknife for him to work on overnight, seeing as the time zones are quite literally inverted," said drummer Oli Khan in an interview, "so then, in the morning, we’d get what he’d been working on, and then interpret and work on that before sending it back to him at the end of the day."

== Release and promotion ==
On 9 August 2021, the band they announced that their second album, Homesick, was set for release on 14 January 2022. However, in December 2021, they stated that the album was delayed until 25 March 2022, but then in early March 2022, they moved the album release one week early to 18 March 2022. The first single "Sick" was released the same date as the new album announcement. On 15 October 2021, they released the second single "Again Again". On 18 November 2021, the third single, "Hometown", was released along with the launching of a short Homesick documentary, "Brixton at Night", that featured fan interviews and live performance clips from the band's sold-out headline show at Brixton Academy in London. On 21 January 2022, they released another single, "Sleeping With You". The fifth single off the album, "Lonely", was released on 15 February 2022, accompanied with a music video starring JoJo Macari (Sex Education, The Irregulars). On 5 May 2022, they released a bonus track, "DNA", for the album's DSP standard and deluxe edition. It was initially launched as an exclusive limited 7" vinyl for the 15th anniversary of Record Store Day in April 2022.

In support of the album release, intimate record store shows were held across the UK in May 2022 as well as a European and UK headline tour in November and December 2022.

== Track listing ==
Standard edition
No.	Title	Writer(s)	Producer(s)	Length
1.	"Hometown"	Henry Camamile; Nick Hahn	Larry Hibbitt; Jacknife Lee	3:51
2.	"Sick"	Camamile; Hahn	Hibbitt; Lee	3:16
3.	"Lonely"	Camamile; Jonny Coffer	Hibbitt; Coffer	3:11
4.	"Someone's Daughter Someone's Son"	Camamile; Lee; Justin Parker; Rich Cooper	Hibbitt; Lee	3:50
5.	"Sleeping with You"	Camamile; Jon Green	Hibbitt	4:09
6.	"Paracetamol Blues"	Camamile; Cass Lowe	Hibbitt; Lowe	3:55
7.	"Again Again"	Camamile; Gez O'Connell; Luke Fitton	Hibbitt; Lee	3:03
8.	"Lucky"	Camamile; Kieran Shudall	Hibbitt	3:48
9.	"Higher"	Camamile; Lee; Justin Hayward-Young; Max Wolfgang	Hibbitt; Lee	3:21
10.	"Cute Guys"	Camamile; Wolfgang	Hibbitt	4:05
11.	"Friends"	Camamile; Oliver Khan; Rory Young	Hibbitt	3:51
Total length:				40:20

Deluxe edition bonus tracks
No.	Title	Writer(s)	Producer(s)	Length
12.	"Watch Your Step"	Camamile; O'Connell; Wolfgang	Hibbitt	3:12
13.	"I Got You"	Camamile; Gianluca Buccellati	Hibbitt	3:50
Total length:				47:22

DSP standard and deluxe edition bonus track (Note: "DNA" is listed as the third track of the album's DSP standard and deluxe edition.)
No.	Title	Writer(s)	Producer(s)	Length
14.	"DNA"	Camamile; Parker; Cooper	Hibbitt; Lee	3:49
Total length:				51:11

== Personnel ==
Sea Girls

- Henry Camamile – vocals (all tracks), electric guitar (1, 2, 4–6, 8, 9, 11–13), acoustic guitar (3, 4, 10, 12), background vocals (1)
- Rory Young – electric guitar (1–6, 8–12), background vocals (2, 11), acoustic guitar (5)
- Andrew Dawson – bass (1–12), background vocals (2–4, 6, 7, 9, 11, 12)
- Oliver Khan – drums (1–12), acoustic guitar (5, 11), piano (5, 10, 12, 13), keyboards (10), background vocals (11)

Additional musicians

- Jacknife Lee – keyboards, percussion, programming (1, 2, 4, 7); electric guitar (1, 2, 4), background vocals (1), vocals (2)
- Larry Hibbitt – keyboards, programming (1–12); electric guitar (1–6, 8, 9, 11, 12), percussion (1–9, 11, 12), bass (2, 6–9, 12), drums (2), piano (3), string arrangement (7), background vocals (8, 13), acoustic guitar (10, 13), strings (13)
- Dan Grech-Marguerat – programming (1–11)
- Jonathan Green – piano (5)
- Cass Lowe – keyboards, percussion, programming (6)
- Luke Burgoyne – programming (6, 8)
- Davide Rossi – string arrangement, strings (7)
- Charles Hayden Hicks – programming (11)

Technical

- Joe LaPorta – mastering
- Dan Grech-Marguerat – mixing (1–11)
- Luke Burgoyne – mixing (6, 8), mixing assistance (1–11)
- Charles Haydon Hicks – mixing (11), mixing assistance (1–11)
- Larry Hibbitt – mixing (12, 13), engineering (1, 3–5, 8–13), tape realization (10)
- Alex O'Donovan – engineering
- James Mottershead – engineering (4, 9)
- Jacknife Lee – engineering (7)
- Luke Ferrero – engineering assistance

== Charts ==
Chart performance for Homesick
Chart (2022)	Peak position
Scottish Albums (OCC)	2
UK Albums (OCC)	3
