= Open Up Your Head =

Studio album by Sea Girls
- Released: 14 August 2020
- Studio: Snap!; Octagon; Assault & Battery; The Pool Studios (London)
- Length: 49:40
- Label: Polydor
- Producer: Larry Hibbitt

Sea Girls chronology
Under Exit Lights (2020)	Open Up Your Head (2020)	Homesick (2022)

Singles from Open Up Your Head
- 1. "Call Me Out" Released: 1 June 2017; 2. "All I Want to Hear You Say" Released: 11 September 2018; 3. "Damage Done" Released: 7 May 2019; 4. "Closer" Released: 12 July 2019; 5. "Violet" Released: 20 August 2019; 6. "Ready for More" Released: 15 January 2020; 7. "Do You Really Wanna Know?" Released: 29 April 2020; 8. "Forever" Released: 6 August 2020

Open Up Your Head is the debut studio album by English indie rock band Sea Girls. It was released on 14 August 2020 under Polydor and produced by Larry Hibbitt. The album debuted at number three on the UK Albums Chart.

== Composition ==
The themes of the album revolve mainly around frontman Henry Camamile's struggles after his head injury accident when he worked at a pub and how it affected his mental health and love life. During this time, writing songs was his only way to express his true feelings, "I guess that's why the album's called Open Up Your Head," he said to Apple Music. "It was the first place I put into the world what might be going on with me."

== Release and promotion ==
In April 2020, Sea Girls announced that they would release their debut album in August 2020. The album was released on 14 August 2020 and includes their debut single "Call Me Out" (2017), "All I Want to Hear You Say" (2018), "Damage Done" (2019) and three singles that previously appeared on the Under Exit Lights EP (2020), "Closer", "Ready for More" and "Violet". Their two singles, "Do You Really Wanna Know?" and "Forever" supported the album as well.

A series of intimate album launch shows across the UK were set for November 2020 and January 2021, but due to the COVID-19 pandemic, the album tour was rescheduled several times and finally done in August and September 2021. The shows were then followed by a UK headline tour in October 2021.

== Critical reception ==
Professional ratings
Aggregate scores
Source	Rating
AnyDecentMusic?	6.9/10
Metacritic	77/100
Review scores
Source	Rating
Clash	8/10
The Guardian	3/5 stars
The Line of Best Fit	7.5/10
musicOMH	4.5/5 stars
NME	4/5 stars
PopMatters	8/10

Open Up Your Head received mostly positive reviews from contemporary music critics. At Metacritic, which assigns a normalised rating out of 100 to reviews from mainstream critics, the album received an average score of 77, based on 6 reviews, which indicates "generally favorable reviews". Most of the critics praised the album for its catchy tunes and big pop hooks, as well as personal yet relatable lyrics to the modern youth.

== Track listing ==
Open Up Your Head track listing
No.	Title	Writer(s)	Length
1.	"Transplant"	Henry Camamile; Jonathan Green	3:31
2.	"All I Want to Hear You Say"	Camamile; Max Wolfgang	3:08
3.	"Do You Really Wanna Know?"	Camamile; Justin Hayward-Young; Wolfgang	2:58
4.	"Lie To Me"	Camamile; Jennifer Decilveo	3:19
5.	"Call Me Out"	Camamile	3:52
6.	"Closer"	Rory Young	3:21
7.	"Forever"	Young	4:00
8.	"Weight In Gold"	Camamile; Iain Archer	3:20
9.	"Ready For More"	Camamile; Wolfgang	3:27
10.	"Violet"	Camamile; Hayward-Young; Wolfgang	3:30
11.	"Shake"	Young	3:28
12.	"Damage Done"	Camamile; Hayward-Young; William Bloomfield	3:46
13.	"You Over Anyone"	Camamile; Frank Callucci	3:50
14.	"Moving On"	Camamile; Francis Anthony White	4:10
Total length:			49:40

== Personnel ==
Credits adapted from AllMusic.

Sea Girls

- Henry Camamile – vocals, guitars
- Rory Young – guitars, backing vocals
- Andrew Dawson – bass, backing vocals
- Oli Khan – drums, keyboards

Production

- Larry Hibbitt – production
- James Mottershead – engineer
- Alex O'Donovan – editing, engineer
- Cenzo Townshend – mixing
- Nick Watson – mastering
- Jonny Breakwell – assistant engineer
- Billy Foster – assistant engineer
- Richie Kennedy – assistant engineer
- Xander Wright – assistant engineer
- Camden Clarke – mixing assistant
- Robert Sellens – mixing assistant

Artwork

- Richard Andrews – design
- Andrew Cooper – photography
- Harris Thomlinson Spence – photography
- Matthew Parri Thomas – photography

== Charts ==
Chart performance for Open Up Your Head
Chart (2020)	Peak position
Scottish Albums (OCC)	2
UK Albums (OCC)	3

== Certifications ==
Certifications for Open Up Your Head
Region	Certification	Certified units/sales
United Kingdom (BPI)	Silver	60,000^{‡}
^{‡} Sales+streaming figures based on certification alone.
