= Sea Girls =

British alternative rock band

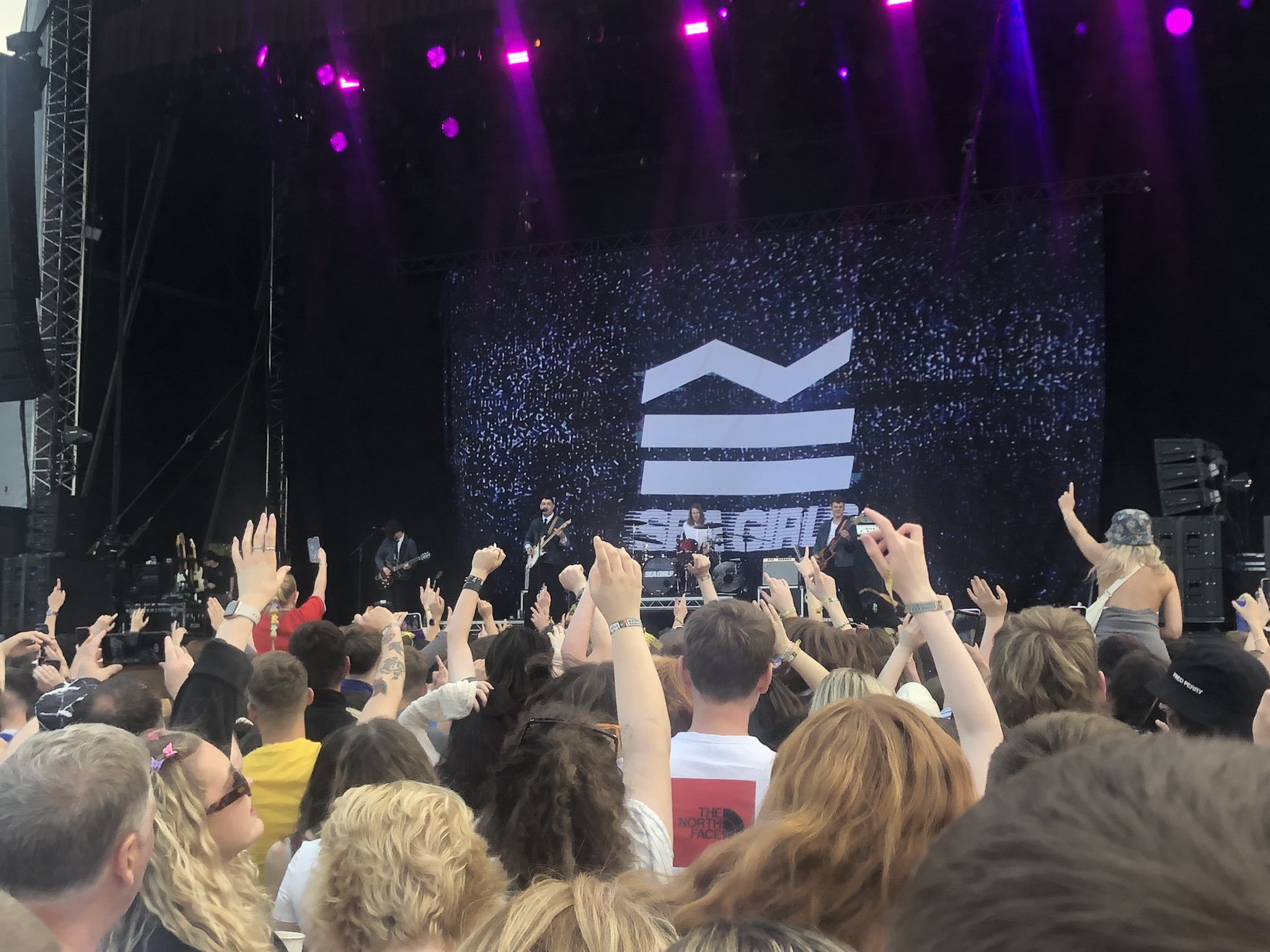
- Sea Girls performing at Neighbourhood Weekender, May 2023

Background information
- Origin: London, UK
- Genres: Indie rock
- Years active: 2015–present
- Labels: Alt. Records; Polydor; Almanac
- Members: Henry Camamile; Rory Young; Andrew Dawson; Oli Khan
- Website: www.seagirls.net

Sea Girls are a British indie rock band formed in 2015, comprising four members: Henry Camamile (vocals, guitar), Rory Young (lead guitar), Andrew Dawson (bass), and Oli Khan (drums).

The band are known for their indie rock anthems and energetic live shows. Their first release under Polydor, "Damage Done", was released on 7 May 2019. Their debut single, "Call Me Out" was released on Almanac Recordings on 1 June 2017, followed by their debut EP of the same name on 8 June 2017. They released their second EP Heavenly War on 4 January 2018. Adored, the band's third EP, was released on 5 June 2018. Their first EP under Polydor, Under Exit Lights, was released on 6 March 2020. They have released three studio albums: Open Up Your Head (2020), Homesick (2022), both of which charted within the UK top 3, and Midnight Butterflies (2024).

== History ==
=== Formation and early beginning ===
The members individually hail from Lincolnshire and Leicestershire. Although the band was not officially formed until 2015, it was at Oakham School that the members had all met. During this time each member had played in separate bands, and it was not until they all eventually settled in London that they came together to form their own.

The band's name came from a misheard lyric of a Nick Cave song, "Water's Edge". Guitarist Rory Young loves the song but always sung the words as 'sea girls' instead of 'city girls'. When asked about the name, drummer Oli Khan said, "We liked the nostalgia and whimsiness of it, but we also just needed a name pretty quickly at the time!"

=== 2017–2019: Call Me Out, Heavenly War, and Adored ===
The band's debut single, "Call Me Out", was self-released on 1 June 2017. This live fan favourite was succeeded by the release of a four-track EP of the same name on 8 June 2017. Their second EP, Heavenly War, was released on 4 January 2018. A third EP, Adored, was released on 5 June 2018 as a tribute to the band's first single, "Call Me Out". To celebrate this anniversary, Sea Girls released this EP as a special edition 7" vinyl. These EPs were all self-released before the band eventually signed with Polydor Records in 2019.

Sea Girls started out the 2018 festival season at the BBC Music festival The Biggest Weekend 26 May 2018 in Swansea. They went on to play the Reading and Leeds Festivals on 25 and 26 August 2018. The band was invited back to play the festival the following year in 2019.

Their last single of 2018, "All I Want to Hear You Say", released 11 September, set the band up to be featured as part of predicted successful acts of 2019 by multiple sources. In December 2018, it was announced that Sea Girls had been included in the BBC's Sound of 2019 poll. The band were also included on predictors of successful acts in 2019 by Radio X, It's All Indie, and Dork. It was announced in May 2019 that the group had signed a worldwide multi-album deal with Polydor Records. Their first release under Polydor, "Damage Done", was released on 7 May 2019. It was then named by Annie Mac as the hottest record in the world on BBC Radio 1 Annie Mac show. The band's second single released under Polydor was "Violet" on 20 August of the same year, and was once again praised as the hottest record in the world by Annie Mac.

Shortly after the band's first signed release it was also announced that they would be supporting Russian and Ukraine tour dates in August of Foals's Everything Not Saved Will Be Lost World Tour. In December 2019 the band completed their first American tour, playing shows at the Mercury Lounge in New York City and at the Hotel Café in Los Angeles. Sea Girls closed out 2019 with an inclusion in the MTV Push: Ones To Watch 2020 shortlist.

=== 2020: Under Exit Lights and Open Up Your Head ===
Their first release of 2020, "Ready For More", was released in January 2020, along with the announcement of their first EP under Polydor; Under Exit Lights which was released on 6 March 2020. Their debut album, Open Up Your Head, was released on 14 August 2020 and peaked at number 3 on the UK Albums Chart; having been announced on 29 April 2020 along with the release of single "Do You Really Wanna Know?". Album launch shows across record stores in the UK were set for November 2020 and January 2021, but later rescheduled several times due to the COVID-19 pandemic and finally were done in August and September 2021.

=== 2021–present: Homesick ===
The band's first release of 2021, a cover of "Nothing Breaks Like a Heart" by Mark Ronson and Miley Cyrus, was released on 12 February 2021. Later, on 9 August 2021, they announced that their second album, Homesick, was set for release on 14 January 2022. However, in December 2021, they stated that the album was delayed until 25 March 2022, but then in early March 2022, they moved the album release one week early to 18 March 2022. Homesick peaked at number 3 on the UK Albums Chart, making it their second attempt to have consecutively charted at the same position. On 23 April 2022, they released a post album single, "DNA", in an exclusive limited 7" vinyl for the 15th anniversary of Record Store Day. It was then released digitally on 5 May 2022, alongside the music video. In support of the album release, intimate record store shows were held across the UK in May 2022 as well as a European and UK headline tour in November and December 2022.

On 6 September 2022, they premiered a standalone single, "Falling Apart". It features heavy The Sopranos references, as it was written after Camamile watched the series. On 22 September 2022, it was announced that the song is featured on the FIFA 23 official soundtrack.

In the same year, they supported German rock band Giant Rooks on their Germany and Switzerland Rookery Tour dates. They also played their debut set at Glastonbury Festival and debut headliner set at 110 Above Festival.

Following their successful debut performance at Alexandra Palace in late 2022, they released a live album, The Hometown Tour Live, on 26 May 2023. The 21-track album was self-released. On 21 September 2023, they released the single "Weekends and Workdays", having been teased online and played live at festival sets since May 2023. It was also revealed that the band are now signed to the label Alt. Records.

== Members ==
- Henry Camamile – vocals, rhythm guitar
- Rory Young – lead guitar, backing vocals
- Andrew Dawson – bass, backing vocals
- Oli Khan – drums, percussion, keyboards

== Discography ==
=== Studio albums ===
Title	Details	Peak chart positions	
Title	Details	UK	SCO
Open Up Your Head	Released: 14 August 2020; Label: Polydor; Format: Digital download, CD, cassette, LP	3	2
Homesick	Released: 18 March 2022; Label: Polydor; Format: Digital download, CD, cassette, LP	3	2
Midnight Butterflies	Released: 14 June 2024; Label: Alt; Format: Digital download, CD, cassette, LP	5	4

=== Live albums ===
Title	Details
The Hometown Tour Live	Live at Alexandra Palace: Release: 26 May 2023; Label: Self-released; Format: Digital download, LP

=== Compilation albums ===
Title	Details
Favourite Colours	Tracks not on Open Up Your Head: Release: 14 August 2020; Label: Polydor; Format: Cassette

=== Extended plays ===
Title	Details
Call Me Out	Released: 8 June 2017; Label: Almanac; Format: Digital download, LP
Heavenly War	Released: 4 January 2018; Label: Almanac; Format: Digital download
Adored	Released: 5 June 2018; Label: Almanac; Format: Digital download, LP
Under Exit Lights	Released: 6 March 2020; Label: Polydor; Format: Digital download, CD, LP
Live at BBC Maida Vale	Released: 17 September 2024; Label: Alt; Format: Digital download

=== Singles ===
Title	Year	Certifications	Album/EP
"Call Me Out"	2017	BPI: Silver	Call Me Out
"Lost"	2017		Heavenly War
"What For"	2017		Heavenly War
"Heavenly War"	2018		Heavenly War
"Eat Me Whole"	2018		Adored
"Too Much Fun"	2018		Adored
"Adored"	2018		Adored
"All I Want to Hear You Say"	2018	BPI: Silver	Open Up Your Head
"Open Up Your Head"	2019		Favourite Colours
"Damage Done"	2019		Open Up Your Head
"Closer" (Note: "Closer", "Violet" and "Ready For More" also features on Sea Girls' debut album Open Up Your Head.)	2019		Under Exit Lights
"Violet"	2019		Under Exit Lights
"Ready for More"	2020		Under Exit Lights
"Do You Really Wanna Know?"	2020		Open Up Your Head
"Forever"	2020		Open Up Your Head
"Accident Waiting to Happen"	2020		Non-album singles
"This is the End"	2020		Non-album singles
"Nothing Breaks Like a Heart"	2021		Non-album singles
"Sick"	2021		Homesick
"Again Again"	2021		Homesick
"Hometown"	2021		Homesick
"Sleeping with You"	2022		Homesick
"Lonely"	2022		Homesick
"DNA" (Note: "DNA" is listed as the third track of Homesick DSP standard and deluxe edition.)	2022		Homesick
"Falling Apart"	2022		Non-album single
"Weekends and Workdays"	2023		Midnight Butterflies
"Young Strangers"	2023		Midnight Butterflies
"Million Years"	2023		Non-album single
"I Want You to Know Me"	2024		Midnight Butterflies
"Midnight Butterflies"	2024		Midnight Butterflies
"Come Back to Me"	2024		Midnight Butterflies
"Polly"	2024		Midnight Butterflies

== Awards and nominations ==
Year	Organization	Award	Work	Result
2018	It's All Indie	Sounds of 2019	Themselves	Included
2018	BBC	Sound of 2019	Themselves	Included
2018	Dork	Hype List 2019	Themselves	Included
2019	Radio X	Great X-Pectations 2019	Themselves	Included
2020	MTV Push	Ones to Watch 2020	Themselves	Included
2020	Radio X	Best Albums of 2020	Open Up Your Head	Included
