= The Inside (album) =

Studio album by Zebra & Giraffe
- Released: 27 September 2010
- Genre: Alternative rock
- Length: 54:23
- Label: Just Music

Zebra & Giraffe chronology
The Inside (2010)	The Wisest Ones (2012)

Singles from The Inside
- 1. "End of the Road"; 2. "Undo Those Lies"

The Inside is the second full-length album released by alternative rock band Zebra & Giraffe.

== Track listing ==
All tracks are written by Greg Carlin except where noted

No.	Title	Length
1.	"I Belong"	3:32
2.	"Terrified"	4:01
3.	"Love Like Water"	3:57
4.	"The Inside"	4:01
5.	"Undo These Lies"	3:32
6.	"End of the Road"	4:38
7.	"Make This a Sign"	3:05
8.	"Have I Got No Soul?"	3:39
9.	"Bleed Me Out"	3:02
10.	"When I Die"	3:27
11.	"Fixation Girl"	4:14
12.	"It's Not What It Seems"	4:33
13.	"The Inside (USB Human Remix)"	3:58
14.	"The Inside (Darkchris Remix)"	4:44
Total length:		54:23
