= Under the Volcano (The Family Rain album) =

Under The Volcano

Studio album by The Family Rain
- Released: 31 January 2014
- Recorded: 2013; Hansa Studios, Berlin
- Genre: Alternative rock, indie rock, blues rock
- Length: 32:22
- Label: Virgin EMI, (Universal)
- Producer: Jim Abbiss

The Family Rain chronology
Pushing It EP (2013)	Under The Volcano (2014)

Professional ratings
Review scores
Source	Rating
The Guardian	3/5 stars
NME	7/10

Under the Volcano is the only studio album by the English rock group The Family Rain, released on 31 January 2014 through Virgin EMI Records. It was produced by Jim Abbiss and recorded over four weeks at Hansa Studios in Berlin. The release was preceded by the singles "Trust Me I'm A Genius", "Carnival", "Reason to Die", "Feel Better (FRANK)" and the EP "Pushing It".

== Track listing ==
All tracks are written by The Family Rain

Standard version
No.	Title	Length
1.	"Carnival"	3:07
2.	"Trust Me... I'm a Genius"	2:12
3.	"Feel Better (FRANK)"	3:15
4.	"Don't Waste Your Time"	3:54
5.	"Reason to Die"	2:51
6.	"Binocular"	3:02
7.	"On My Back"	3:11
8.	"Pushing It"	3:20
9.	"Together"	4:01
10.	"All the Best"	3:29

Deluxe edition
No.	Title	Length
11.	"White Marble Soup"	2:52
12.	"Alexander"	3:36
13.	"Friction"	3:15

iTunes Deluxe edition
No.	Title	Length
14.	"Enjoy the Silence"	3:29
15.	"Feel Better (FRANK)" (Live at the iTunes Festival, London 2013)	3:42
16.	"The Family Rain in Berlin: Recording the Album" (Video)	4:11
