= Given to the Wild =

Studio album by the Maccabees
- Released: 9 January 2012
- Recorded: Rockfield Studios, Monmouthshire
- Genre: Indie rock; alternative rock; art rock; progressive rock
- Length: 52:51
- Label: Fiction; Polydor
- Producer: The Maccabees; Tim Goldsworthy; Bruno Ellingham; Jag Jago

The Maccabees chronology
Wall of Arms (2009)	Given to the Wild (2012)	Marks to Prove It (2015)

Singles from Given to the Wild
- 1. "Pelican" Released: 30 December 2011; 2. "Feel to Follow" Released: 3 February 2012; 3. "Went Away" Released: 28 May 2012; 4. "Ayla" Released: 10 September 2012

Given to the Wild is the third studio album by English indie rock band the Maccabees. The album was first released in the United Kingdom on 9 January 2012, where it debuted at number four on the UK Albums Chart and number thirty-one on the Irish Albums Chart. The album has seen four single releases: "Pelican", "Feel to Follow", "Went Away", and "Ayla".

== Reception ==
The album has a Metascore of 69 out of 100 on Metacritic based on 20 critic reviews, stating that the album has "generally favourable reviews". NME gave the album a 9/10. The album was nominated for the 2012 Mercury Prize.

Professional ratings
Aggregate scores
Source	Rating
Metacritic	69/100
Review scores
Source	Rating
Clash	(9/10)
The Guardian	4/5 stars
Drowned in Sound	(7/10)
The Times	4/5 stars
NME	(9/10)
The Fly	(9/10)
The Upcoming	4/5 stars
The Music Service	7/10 stars
Pop 'stache	3.5/5 stars
Pitchfork	(4.0/10)

== Recording ==
The band worked on the 13-track album, their third, at Rockfield Studios with Tim Goldsworthy and Bruno Ellingham (LCD Soundsystem, Massive Attack) over late 2010 to 2011. They also worked on large parts of the record with producer Jag Jago at their rehearsal space in London's Elephant and Castle district before decamping to Suffolk to finish the record at Decoy Studios with Cenzo Townshend and Sean Julliard.

The band have said they took inspiration from "disparate musical peers" such as the Stone Roses, Kate Bush and David Bowie during the recording of the LP, which is the follow-up to 2009's Wall of Arms.

Speaking about the title of the album, singer Orlando Weeks told the NME: "'Given to the wild' is the first line on the album and was a title idea we had pretty early on. But it wasn't until we'd finished recording that we could come back to it and know that it suited, it just felt right."

== Singles ==
- "Pelican" was released as the album's lead single on 30 December 2011. The song entered the UK Singles Chart at number 87. It appeared in the video game Forza Horizon.
- "Feel to Follow" was released on 3 February 2012. The song peaked to number 188 on the UK Singles Chart.
- "Went Away", the third single from Given to the Wild, was released on 28 May 2012.
- "Ayla" was the fourth single to be released on 10 September 2012.

== Track listing ==
Track listing adapted from Spotify.

No.	Title	Length
1.	"Given to the Wild (Intro)"	2:11
2.	"Child"	4:31
3.	"Feel to Follow"	3:29
4.	"Ayla"	3:47
5.	"Glimmer"	4:03
6.	"Forever I've Known"	5:21
7.	"Heave"	4:24
8.	"Pelican"	3:44
9.	"Went Away"	3:38
10.	"Go"	4:12
11.	"Unknow"	5:07
12.	"Slowly One"	4:17
13.	"Grew Up at Midnight"	4:00
Total length:		52:51

== Credits ==
Credits adapted from Tidal.

The Maccabees

- Orlando Weeks – vocals (all tracks), guitar (all tracks)
- Felix White – guitar (all tracks)
- Hugo White – guitar (all tracks)
- Rupert Jarvis – bass guitar (all tracks)
- Sam Doyle - drums (all tracks)

Technical

- Felix White – production (all tracks)
- Hugo White – production (all tracks)
- Orlando Weeks – production (all tracks)
- Rupert Jarvis – production (all tracks)
- Sam Doyle – production (all tracks)
- Bruno Ellingham (all tracks), recording engineer (all tracks)
- Tim Goldsworthy (all tracks), recording engineer (all tracks)
- Prabjote Osahn - recording engineer (7, 12, 13)
- Tom Dalgety - assistant recording engineer (all tracks)
- John Davis - mastering engineer (all tracks)
- Sean Juilliard - assistant engineer (all tracks)
- Cenzo Townshend - mixer (all tracks)

Additional musicians

- Jack Birchwood - horn (2, 4, 5, 13)
- Nick Carter - horn (2, 4, 5, 13)
- Tom Stone - horn (2, 4, 5, 13)
- Darren Morris - piano (2, 3, 5)
- Will White - keyboards (4, 8, 9, 11)
- Prabjote Osahn - string arranger (7, 12, 13), violin (7, 12, 13)

Artwork

- Andy Goldsworthy – cover photo
- Go De Jong – design, layout
- Tom Oxley - inlay photography

== Chart performance ==
On 12 January 2012, Given to the Wild entered the Irish Albums Chart at number 31.

Chart (2012)	Peak position
Belgian Albums Chart (Flanders)	92
Dutch Albums Chart	57
Irish Albums Chart	31
UK Albums Chart	4
