= Marks to Prove It =

2015 studio album by the Maccabees

Studio album by the Maccabees
- Released: 31 July 2015
- Recorded: September 2013–February 2015
- Studio: Elephant
- Length: 41:17
- Label: Fiction; Communion
- Producer: The Maccabees; Laurie Latham

The Maccabees chronology
Given to the Wild (2012)	Marks to Prove It (2015)

Singles from Marks to Prove It
- 1. "Marks to Prove It" Released: 11 May 2015; 2. "Something Like Happiness" Released: 1 June 2015; 3. "Spit It Out" Released: 31 July 2015

Marks to Prove It is the fourth studio album by the English band the Maccabees, released on 31 July 2015 through Fiction Records. Upon release, it reached number one in the UK Album chart. In North America, a digital version was made available through Communion Records with a physical release to follow at a later date.

The album was recorded in the band's studio in Elephant and Castle and pays tribute to the area, including the album cover being of the Michael Faraday Memorial that is near the studio.

== Critical reception ==
Professional ratings
Aggregate scores
Source	Rating
Metacritic	74/100
Review scores
Source	Rating
AllMusic	3.5/5 stars
Clash	8/10
Drowned in Sound	8/10
The Guardian	3/5 stars
NME	4/5 stars

According to the review aggregator Metacritic, Marks to Prove It received "generally favorable reviews" based on a weighted average score of 74 out of 100 from 15 critic scores.

=== Year-end lists ===
Publication	List	Rank	Ref.
NME	Albums of the Year 2015	9	

== Track listing ==
All tracks are written by the Maccabees.

No.	Title	Length
1.	"Marks to Prove It"	4:13
2.	"Kamakura"	3:59
3.	"Ribbon Road"	4:23
4.	"Spit It Out"	5:09
5.	"Silence"	3:19
6.	"River Song"	3:10
7.	"Slow Sun"	4:12
8.	"Something Like Happiness"	3:43
9.	"WW1 Portraits"	3:18
10.	"Pioneering Systems"	2:30
11.	"Dawn Chorus"	3:18
Total length:		41:17

== Personnel ==
Credits adapted from Tidal.

The Maccabees

- Sam Doyle – drums (all tracks), percussion (tracks 1–4, 6, 7, 9, 11)
- Rupert Jarvis – bass (all tracks)
- Orlando Weeks – vocals (except 5), guitar (1, 9, 10), organ (2, 3), backing vocals (5), kazoo (6)
- Felix White – guitar (all tracks), backing vocals (1–4, 6, 8, 9, 11), piano (3)
- Hugo White – guitar (except 5, 10), organ (1), backing vocals (2, 4, 6, 8, 9), piano (5, 10), vocals (5)

Additional musicians

- Laurie Latham – percussion (1)
- Polly Louise Mackey – backing vocals (2, 3, 6–8, 10, 11)
- Rebekah Raa – piano (2, 9), backing vocals (4, 6, 8, 11)
- Iain Harvie – string arrangements (3, 7, 10)
- Fabiana Palladino – piano (4, 7)
- Mike Davis – trumpet (6–9, 11)
- Kenji Fenton – saxophone (6, 8, 9, 11)
- Paul Burton – trombone (8, 9, 11)
- Stephanie Oyerinde, Sam White – backing vocals (8)
- Geraint Watkins – piano (8)

Technical and design

- The Maccabees – production (all tracks)
- Laurie Latham – production (except 5, 11)
- Jag Jago, Tom Stanley – engineering (all tracks)
- Joe McCann, Sean Juilliard – engineering assistance (1), mixing assistance (except 1)
- Cenzo Townshend – mixing (all tracks)
- Bob Ludwig – mastering (all tracks)
- David Busfield – cover photography
- Go De Jong – design
- James Caddick, James Cronin, Andy Goldsworthy – photography
- Sam Doyle, Pooneh Ghana – portrait photography
