= The Family Rain =

English blues rock band

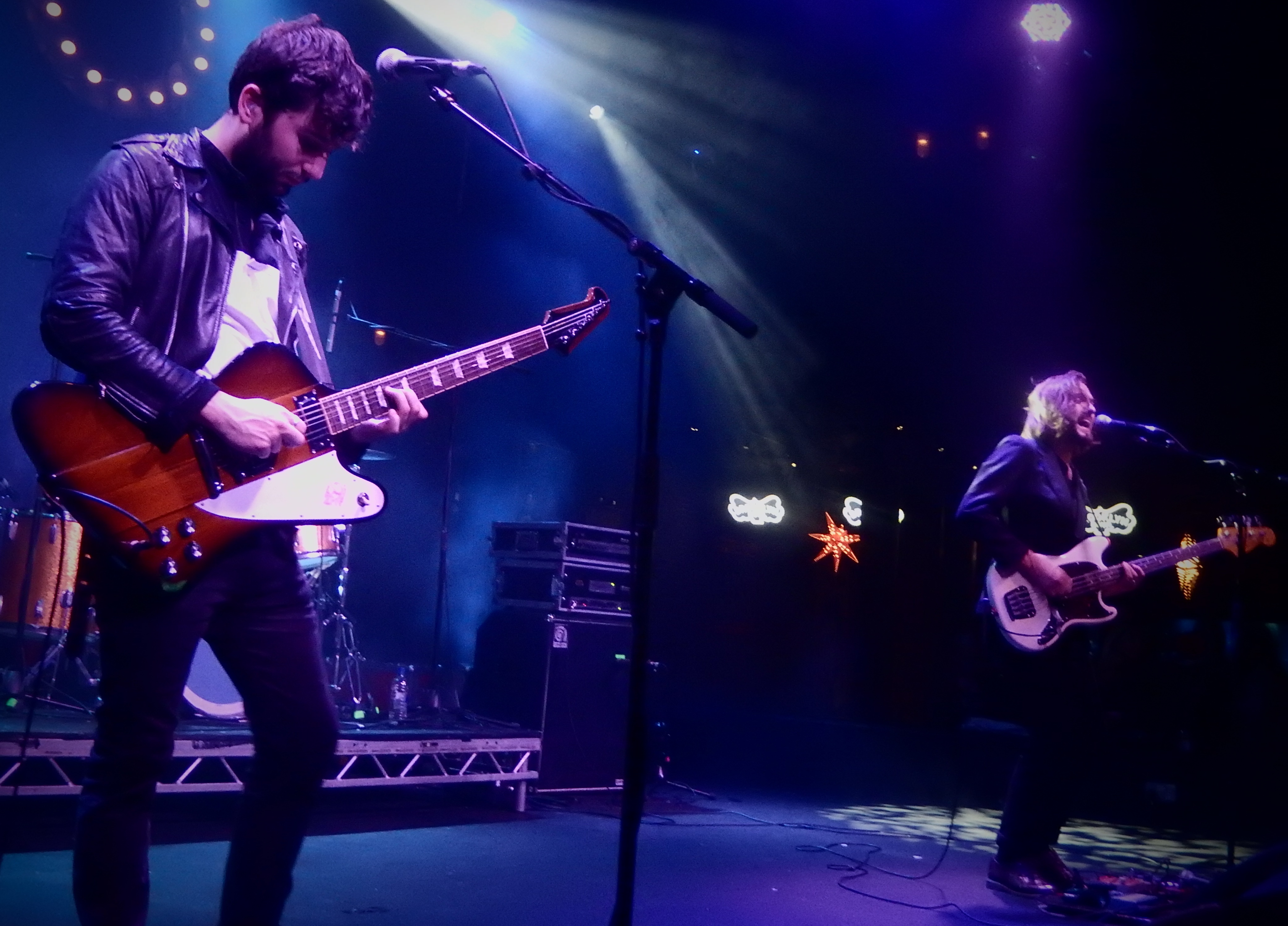
- Live Brooklyn Bowl, London 2015

Background information
- Origin: Bath, England
- Genres: Alternative rock, indie rock, blues rock
- Years active: 2011–2016, 2019-Present
- Labels: Bigger Splash Records (2012); Mercury Records/Virgin EMI (Universal) (2013–2014)
- Past members: William Robert Walter; Oliver "Ollie" Philip Walter; Timothy Michael Walter

The Family Rain are an English blues rock band, formed in Bath in 2011 by brothers William, Ollie and Timothy Walter. The band released three EPs, several singles and debut album "Under The Volcano", before splitting up in 2016. The band announced their return in November 2019 via social media.

== History ==
Before The Family Rain, the three brothers were originally in a Darkness-influenced Rock Pirates, formed in 2004 with guitarist Tom Johnson, who were described as an "irony-free Darkness with bare torsos and blond highlights". The band had "a repertoire of over 10 self-written classics and can also play over 3 hours worth of rock covers". The band changed their name to Dark Horse when they reached 20 and decided to take the band more seriously and released their self-titled debut EP in February 2010. The band initially denied all knowledge of Rock Pirates/Dark Horse, before dismissing their previous incarnation as a "shit covers band" and being formed "when we were learning our instruments".

In 2011 the three brothers regrouped by themselves to form The Family Rain and released their debut single "Trust Me... I'm a Genius" on Bigger Splash Records in November 2012. The band then signed to Universal Music Group subsidiary Mercury Records and began work on their debut album with producer Jim Abbiss at Hansa Studios in Berlin. The band released "Carnival", their first single for Mercury, in March 2013 and followed it up with the Pushing It EP in May 2013 and digital releases "Reason to Die" in July and "Feel Better (FRANK)" in October 2013. The band's debut album Under the Volcano is set for release on 3 February 2014. Following Universal's acquisition of EMI and dissolution of Mercury Records, the band were moved to the label's newly launched Virgin EMI Records. The band also supported Thirty Seconds to Mars at the iTunes Festival in London in September 2013.

The band toured the UK and Europe supporting The Courteeners and Willy Moon throughout March and April 2013 before embarking on their first ever headline tour throughout May and June 2013 in support of the Pushing It EP. Throughout the summer, the band made appearances at several UK festivals including supporting The Rolling Stones at Hyde Park, playing the Festival Republic stage at Reading and Leeds festivals and the Alcove stage at Latitude festival. They also made appearances at festivals throughout Europe, including Sumerwell festival in Buftea, Romania, Pukkelpop festival in Belgium and supported Biffy Clyro at Mallorca Rocks and Ibiza Rocks. From September to November, the band supported Miles Kane and Jake Bugg across the UK before embarking on their second headline tour of the UK in November 2013.

The video for the band's single "Reason to Die", was filmed at the Waterats in London. It was a world first interactive experience created by the Powster agency that allows viewers to manipulate the view of the band's performance via 16 different GoPro cameras as the video plays. The video was nominated for an award in the Interactive Video category at the 2013 UK Music Video Awards, and it won an FWA (Favourite Website Award).

Following their departure from the Virgin EMI roster in 2014, the band self-released their second EP, Hunger Sauce, on 28 July digitally with the aid of the Kobalt Music Group label service AWAL. A limited edition 10" vinyl edition was released exclusively through the band's website on 18 August. The band played at The Nest nightclub in Bath on 12 December 2014 under the pseudonym Vulpicides.

According to the band's social media accounts, they have so far spent 2015 at Rockfield Studios in Wales, recording their next album with producer Tom Dalgety.

On 18 March 2016, the band released the digital only Every So Often EP via their own Matterhorn Records.

The band broke up in 2016, with the brothers going on to form Voyages who released their debut EP New Year’s Day in February 2018.

== Band members ==
- William Robert Walter – lead vocals, bass guitar
- Oliver "Ollie" Philip Walter – lead guitar, backing vocals
- Timothy Michael Walter – drums, backing vocals

== Discography ==
=== Albums ===
- Under the Volcano (February 2014), Virgin EMI Records/Universal

=== EPs ===
- Pushing It (May 2013), Mercury/Universal
- Hunger Sauce (July 2014), AWAL
- Every So Often (March 2016), Matterhorn Records

=== Singles ===
- "Trust Me... I'm a Genius" (November 2012), Bigger Splash Records
- "Carnival" (March 2013), Mercury/Universal
- "Reason to Die" (July 2013), Mercury/Universal
- "Feel Better (FRANK)" (October 2013), Mercury/Universal
