= Love You Better (The Maccabees song) =

Single by The Maccabees

from the album Wall of Arms
- Released: 27 April 2009
- Genre: Indie
- Length: 3:23
- Label: Fiction Records
- Songwriter(s): Orlando Weeks, Felix White, Hugo White, Rupert Jarvis

The Maccabees singles chronology
"No Kind Words" (2009)	"Love You Better" (2009)	"Can You Give It?" (2009)

"Love You Better" is a song from English indie rock band The Maccabees, released as the first single from their second album Wall of Arms, peaking at number 36 in the UK.

The song first received airplay on 16 March 2009 on Radio 1 by DJ Steve Lamacq.

== Music video ==
The music video for the song features the band playing the song amongst blurry, colourful backgrounds.

== Charts ==
Chart 2009)	Peak position
UK Singles (OCC)	36
