= Felix White =

British musician (born 1984)

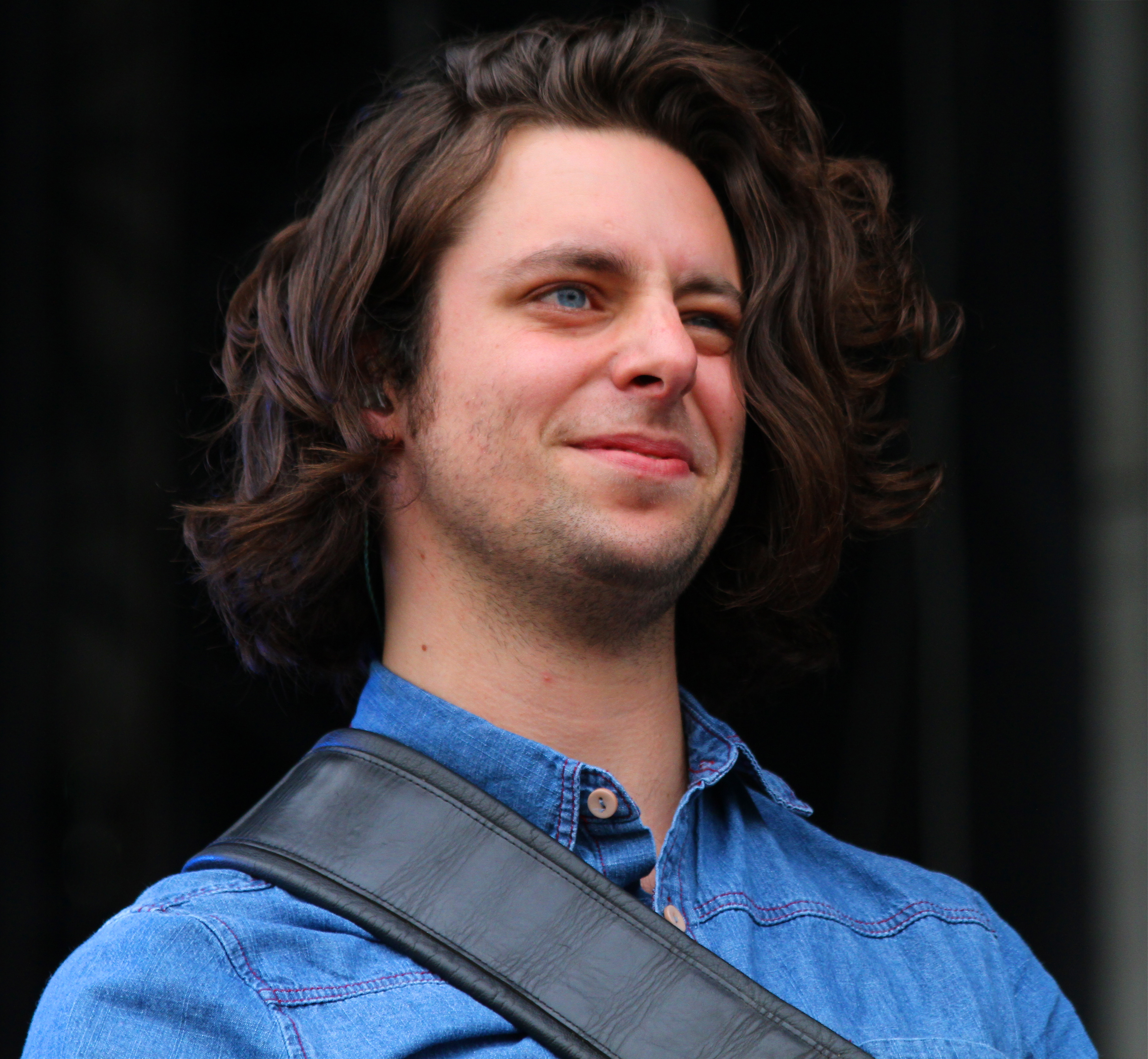
- White in 2012

Background information
- Born: Felix Andrew Odell White; 28 September 1984 (age 41); Wandsworth, London, England
- Education: Alleyn's School; University of Sussex
- Genres: Indie rock
- Occupations: Musician, songwriter, producer, sports commentator, author
- Instruments: Guitar, vocals, piano
- Years active: 2004–present
- Labels: Parlophone; Fiction; Fierce Panda
- Member of: The Maccabees, 86TVs

Felix Andrew Odell White (born 28 September 1984) is a British musician, best known as the guitarist of the British indie rock band The Maccabees and as founding member, guitarist and vocalist of 86TVs. He is also co-presenter on the cricket podcast Tailenders alongside Greg James, James Anderson and Matt Horan.

== Biography ==
=== Early life ===
White was born in Wandsworth, London, England. His mother, Lana White, was an editor in the publishing industry, and his father was involved in urban design. His mother suffered from multiple sclerosis and died in 2002, when White was 17. He was educated at Alleyn's School and studied sociology at the University of Sussex. White has two younger brothers, Hugo and Will. White is a lifelong supporter of Fulham F.C.

=== 2004-2017, 2025-present: The Maccabees ===
White was a founding member of the British indie rock band The Maccabees. He played the guitar, piano, and provided backing vocals. The band announced that they had decided to disband in August 2016.

The Maccabees confirmed their comeback for 2025 on social media, complete with headline festival show at All Points East and a European tour.

=== Post-Maccabees career ===
On 5 August 2016, along with Morad Khokar, White launched Yala! Records, at Bermondsey Social Club. The label aims to provide both a step up and a network of support for upcoming bands.

On 15 November 2017, White along with Greg James and Jimmy Anderson, began hosting a cricketing podcast Tailenders. This was initially a weekly podcast covering the 2017–18 Ashes series; since 23 May 2018 it was renewed to continue on a weekly basis.

He has also written a memoir, on cricket, music and loss, It's Always Summer Somewhere. It was abridged and broadcast on BBC Radio 4, narrated by White, in January 2022.

From September 2022, Felix began fronting features and taking on a colour commentator role for Major League Baseball. The games are shown live on BBC iPlayer in the UK where he regularly joins co-hosts Melanie Newman and Xavier Scruggs.

On 17 August 2023, Felix and his brother Hugo White unveiled their first single, "Worn Out Buildings," as part of their new musical project, 86TVs. Band members included their younger brother, Will White, and drummer Jamie Morrison, known for his previous work with the bands Noisettes and Stereophonics.

On 2 August 2024, 86TVs' self-titled debut album was released alongside a digital-only single "New Used Car" featuring Jamie T.

== Discography ==
Solo

- Cosmo (2013)
- The Edge – OST (2019)
- McEnroe – OST (2022)

The Maccabees

- Colour It In (2007)
- Wall of Arms (2009)
- Given to the Wild (2012)
- Marks to Prove It (2015)

86TVs

- 86TVs (2024)
