= Colour It In =

Studio album by the Maccabees
- Released: 14 May 2007
- Genre: Indie rock, post-punk revival, indie pop
- Length: 37:40
- Label: Polydor
- Producer: Stephen Street; Iain Harvie; Ben Hillier

The Maccabees chronology
Colour It In (2007)	Wall of Arms (2009)

Professional ratings
Review scores
Source	Rating
AllMusic	3.5/5 stars
Digital Spy	4/5 stars
Drowned in Sound	8/10 stars
Gigwise	4/5 stars
NME	8/10 stars
Pitchfork Media	(4.1/10)
Pixelsurgeon	7/10 stars
This Is Fake DIY	4.5/5 stars

Colour It In is the debut studio album by the British indie band the Maccabees. It was released in the UK on 14 May and in the US on 22 May 2007. It was released on the UK iTunes Store on 16 April 2007. The album name is from the B-side from the third single "First Love". The album was named the 24th best Album of 2007 by NME. In 2024, The Independent included it in their list of 20 most underrated albums at number 20.

== Track listing ==
All tracks written by Rupert Jarvis, Robert Dylan Thomas, Orlando Weeks, Felix White and Hugo White, except where noted.

Colour It In
No.	Title	Length
1.	"Good Old Bill"	2:11
2.	"X-Ray"	3:15
3.	"All in Your Rows"	2:35
4.	"Latchmere"	3:01
5.	"About Your Dress"	2:14
6.	"Precious Time"	4:17
7.	"O.A.V.I.P."	2:20
8.	"Tissue Shoulders"	2:29
9.	"Happy Faces"	2:50
10.	"First Love"	3:03
11.	"Mary"	3:30
12.	"Lego"	3:10
13.	"Toothpaste Kisses"	2:39
Total length:		37:40

2008 Special Edition Bonus Tracks
No.	Title	Length
14.	"The Real Thing"	1:39
15.	"Just Like the Rain (Richard Hawley)"	3:49
16.	"Colour It In"	1:42
17.	"Sore Throat"	2:21
18.	"Diamond Solitaire"	0:45
19.	"Bicycles"	2:59
Total length:		50:06

== Certifications ==
Region	Certification	Certified units/sales
United Kingdom (BPI)	Gold	100,000^{‡}
^{‡} Sales+streaming figures based on certification alone.

== Singles ==
"First Love" was the band's first single to crack the UK top 40, peaking at number forty.

"About Your Dress" is the band's fourth single, and their second to make the UK top 40, peaking at number thirty-three - their highest charting single to date.

"Precious Time" is the band's third single released on Fiction Records, and the band's fifth overall. It was their first single under Fiction not to chart in the UK top 40, peaking at Number 49, and preceded the Colour It In album release.

"Toothpaste Kisses", released on 7 January 2008, it is the fourth track released as a single from the album and The Maccabees's sixth single released overall. The song featured in the advertisement for the Samsung SGH-G800 and also featured in the film Angus, Thongs and Perfect Snogging.
