= Wall of Arms =

Studio album by The Maccabees
- Released: 4 May 2009
- Genre: Indie rock
- Length: 37:08
- Label: Fiction
- Producer: Markus Dravs

The Maccabees chronology
Colour it in (2007)	Wall of Arms (2009)	Given to the Wild (2012)

Wall of Arms is the second studio album by the English indie band The Maccabees, released on 4 May 2009. The album was preceded by the single "Love You Better" on 27 April. The LP was produced by Markus Dravs, who has collaborated with Björk, Arcade Fire and Coldplay in the past.

Wall of Arms was also worked on in various cities including Liverpool and Paris, unlike their first long-player which was recorded in "dribs and drabs" according to frontman Orlando Weeks. The video to the album's first official single, "Love You Better", was uploaded exclusively to ClashMusic.com on 27 March ahead of a 27 April release. A review on the same website reads: "The Maccabees have made sure that no listener is going to leave the experience not feeling touched in some way – by the tonal dexterity, the lyrical openness, or something that’s not so obvious until the third or fourth listen." The album leaked on 26 April 2009.

The album's cover art was created by British artist Boo Ritson, using her technique of coating her subjects with high gloss emulsion and photographing the result.

== Reception ==
Professional ratings
Aggregate scores
Source	Rating
Metacritic	75/100
Review scores
Source	Rating
AllMusic	3.5/5 stars
Clash	(very positive)
Drowned in Sound	(7/10)
The Fly	4/5 stars
Gigwise	4.5/5 stars
God is in the TV	4.5/5 stars
The Guardian	.
The London Paper	4/5 stars
NME	(8/10)
The Observer	4/5 stars
Planet Sound	(8/10)
The Times	3/5 stars

Many professional critics have said that this album, especially the track "No Kind Words", shows a much darker and evolved sound than former album Colour It In:

- "the five-piece have set about traversing the opposite path to recognition, by delivering a distinctly darker second long-player. This shift in tone was showcased early on by the free download single 'No Kind Words'; said song sits dead in the middle of this collection like the itch that you just can’t scratch, oddly pleasurable for all its irritation." - Clash
- "Dismissed as lightweight by some, the band have used their debut as a platform for Wall of Arms, a far more accomplished album that toys with the dreaded 'm' word: maturity. Gone are the playful, youthful lyrics about toothpaste kisses and innocuous fleeting moments with the opposite sex." – musicOMH

Inevitably, comparisons were drawn to Arcade Fire's album Neon Bible, since Markus Dravs produced and used similar techniques on both records:

- "If this all sounds a bit Arcade Fire, note that production credits go to Markus Dravs, who worked on Neon Bible. Thankfully, though, the sound of cynical bandwagon-jumping has been edited out of the mix. In its place are a collection of atmospheric, heartfelt pop songs that frequently fly off at unexpected angles" - The Guardian

== Track listing ==
All tracks by The Maccabees

1. "Love You Better" – 3:20
2. "One Hand Holding" – 3:01
3. "Can You Give It?" – 2:54
4. "Young Lions" – 3:00
5. "Wall of Arms" – 3:04
6. "No Kind Words/Bag of Bones Part A" – 3:39
7. "Dinosaurs" – 3:15
8. "Kiss and Resolve" – 3:07
9. "William Powers" – 3:30
10. "Seventeen Hands" – 3:49
11. "Bag of Bones Part B" – 4.41

== iTunes extended version tracks ==
12. "Empty Vessels" (Single Version) Featuring Roots Manuva – 3.13
13. "Hearts that Strangle" – 1.32
14. "Accordion Song" – 2.49
15. "Sleep Tonight" – 4.04
16. "I Drove All Night" – 3.46

== Singles ==
- "No Kind Words"
- "Love You Better" (27 April 2009)
- "Can You Give It?" (6 July 2009)

== Personnel ==
Credits adapted from Tidal.

The Maccabees

- Orlando Weeks – vocals (all tracks), accordion (8), background vocals (11)
- Felix White – guitar (all tracks), background vocals (11)
- Hugo White – guitar (all tracks), background vocals (11)
- Rupert Jarvis – bass guitar (all tracks), background vocals (11)
- Sam Doyle – drums (all tracks), background vocals (11)

Technical

- Markus Dravs – production (all tracks), mixer (1–15), synthesizer programming (6)
- Iain Harvie – production (16), mixer (16)
- Ruadhri Cushnan – mixer (1–15)
- Bob Ludwig – mastering engineer (1, 2, 3, 4, 5, 6, 7, 8, 9, 10, 11, 13, 14, 15)
- John Davis – mastering engineer (12, 16)
- François Chevallier – engineer (1–15), programmer (11)
- Ewan Davies – engineer (2, 9)

Additional musicians

- Jon Natchez – baritone saxophone (1, 4, 5, 7), tenor saxophone (4, 5, 7, 11, 13)
- Kelly Pratt – flugelhorn (1, 4, 5, 7, 11, 13), trombone (1, 4, 5, 7), trumpet (1, 3, 4, 5, 7)
- Markus Dravs – keyboards (1), background vocals (11)
- Katie Young – background vocals (11)
- Laura-Mary Carter – background vocals (11)
- Rosa Slade – background vocals (11)
