= The Maccabees (band) =

English indie rock band

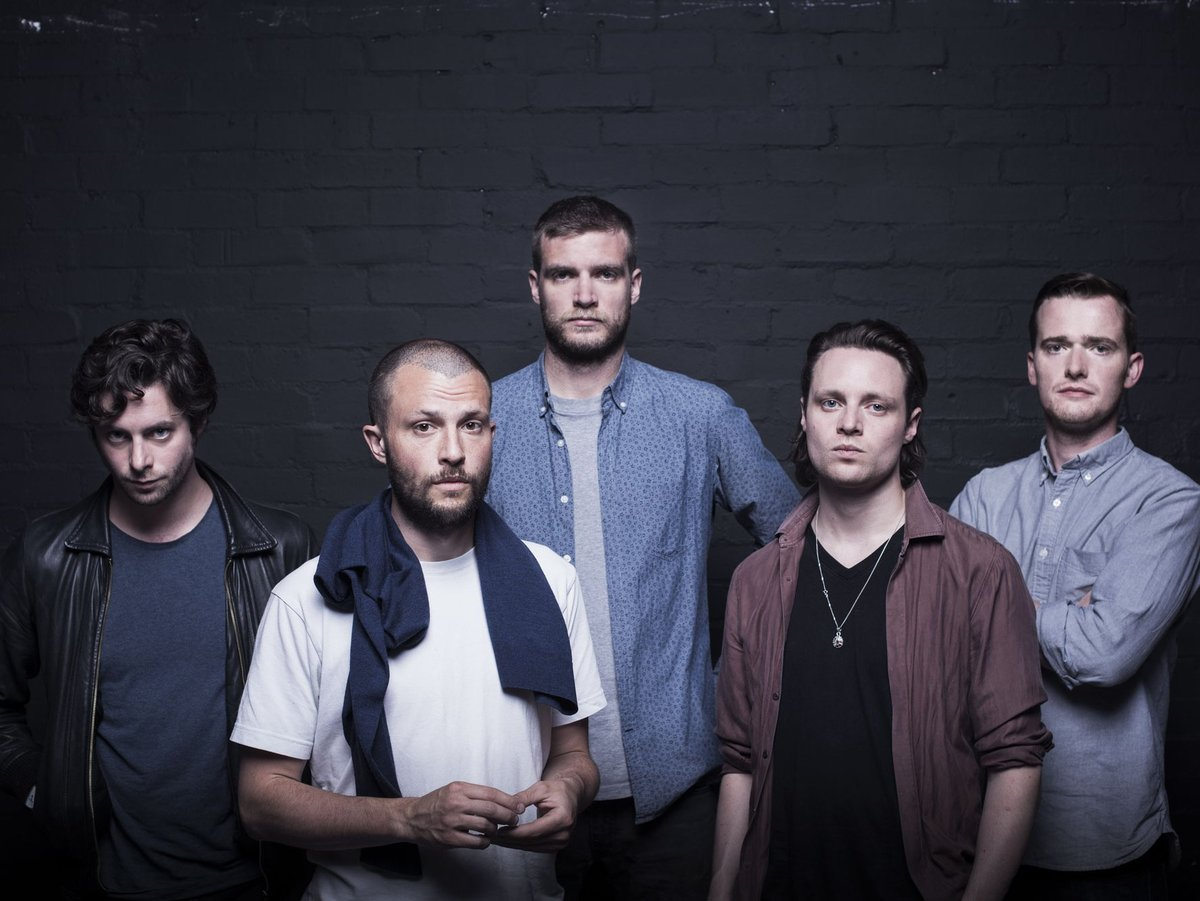
- The Maccabees in 2015 (From left to right: Felix White, Orlando Weeks, Rupert Jarvis, Hugo White, and Sam Doyle.)

Background information
- Origin: London, England
- Genre: Indie rock
- Years active: 2004–2017, 2024–present
- Labels: Fiction; Fierce Panda
- Members: Orlando Weeks; Felix White; Hugo White; Rupert Jarvis; Sam Doyle
- Past members: Robert Dylan Thomas; Elliott Andrews; Will White
- Website: themaccabees.co.uk

The Maccabees are an English indie rock band, formed in 2004 in London. The band consists of Orlando Weeks (vocals, guitar, keyboards), Felix White (guitar, backing vocals), Hugo White (guitar, backing vocals), Rupert Jarvis (bass) and Sam Doyle (drums).

During the band's initial run, they released four studio albums: Colour It In in 2007, followed by Wall of Arms in 2009, Given to the Wild which was released on 9 January 2012 and their last album Marks to Prove It released on 31 July 2015. The band announced their decision to disband in August 2016, with farewell gigs taking place in 2017.

On 25 October 2024, it was announced that the band were reuniting after seven years of inactivity.

== Name ==
The band came up with the name by flicking through books, including the Bible, and looking at names. Despite adopting a name with perceived religious connotations, lead singer Orlando Weeks has more recently affirmed, in an interview on Steve Lamacq's BBC 6 Music show, that none in the band is religious.

== Music career ==
=== 2007–2009: Colour It In ===
Their debut single, "X-Ray", was released on Promise records on 28 November 2005, and received some evening play on London radio station Xfm London. They received little significant exposure, however, until six months later, when they released their second single, "Latchmere", the subject of which is the wave machine at the Latchmere Leisure Centre in Battersea, South London, on Fierce Panda Records in April 2006. This was championed by Radio 1 DJ Steve Lamacq and received airtime on MTV2. The video, directed by Hugh Frost and Samuel Bebbington, also proved an internet hit after it was posted on YouTube. They had their first taste of festivals by playing on the Carling stage of the Leeds/Reading festival in 2006.

The band were signed to major label Fiction Records, and released their debut album Colour It In in May 2007. Because an early copy of the album appeared on the New York Times website, Colour It In became available to download exclusively from iTunes on 16 December, before its physical release on 14 May, in an effort to combat the leak. The single "First Love" was their first to chart in the UK top 40, and was followed by "About Your Dress", which peaked at No. 33. Their album received positive reviews, and charted at No. 24. They then toured the United States with fellow indie group Bloc Party. A full UK tour followed from October 2007, culminating in a sell-out show at the Roundhouse venue in London.

=== 2009–2010: Wall of Arms ===
On the run-up to the release of their second album, the band played two new songs to Steve Lamacq on his "In New Music We Trust" show on Radio 1 in May 2008, "No Kind Words" and "Young Lions". The band also played a string of small venues in the UK to test out new songs, in March and April 2008. The Maccabees performed at Offset Festival in London as well the Underage Festival in August 2008.

On Zane Lowe's Radio 1 show in February 2009, Felix confirmed the name of the follow-up album to be Wall of Arms, an announcement that coincided with the release of the free downloadable track, "No Kind Words". On 16 March, Radio 1 DJ Steve Lamacq played the band's first single from Wall of Arms entitled Love You Better, the video to which was posted exclusively on ClashMusic.com on 27 March.

Wall of Arms was released on 4 May 2009. It entered the UK albums chart at No. 13 and received positive reviews with the NME giving the album 8/10. At the end of the year, Artrocker made the album joint No.1 Album of 2009 along with Yeah Yeah Yeahs' It's Blitz!.

In July 2009, second single "Can You Give It" was released. The Maccabees invited the Dodworth Colliery Band of Barnsley to record a rousing brass version of the single for the B-side. The Guardian interviewed Orlando and Felix during the recording session. The accompanying video for "Can You Give It" was filmed at the famous Coopers Hill annual cheese rolling race in Gloucestershire.

Other performances in 2009 include Reading and Leeds Festivals on 28 and 29 August respectively and Little Noise Sessions on 16 November.

On 3 October 2009, the five-piece band played a gig at Brixton Academy to finish off their Wall of Arms tour. The band pulled in a huge crowd for their homecoming show at the O_{2}, as well as a brass section for many of their songs as they performed their entire 2009 album and a host of tracks from their 2007 debut Colour It In. During the set Felix White declared the Academy as 'the best venue in the world'. The Guardian ran a five star live review of the gig.

In November 2009, The Maccabees collaborated with rapper Roots Manuva on a heady re-working of Wall of Arms album track and live favourite "No Kind Words". The track, newly titled "Empty Vessels", features new lyrics and vocals from fellow south Londoner Roots. It was debuted on Zane Lowe's evening show on Radio One on 11 November. The single release of "Empty Vessels" was made available on iTunes from 24 November 2009 on Fiction Records.

The Maccabees were named as headlines for the Shockwaves NME Awards Tour 2010 with Bombay Bicycle Club, The Big Pink and The Drums in February 2010.

=== 2012–2013: Given to the Wild ===
The Maccabees debuted new song "Child" in Brighton in August 2010, as well as playing the Main Stage at the Reading & Leeds festival 2010, debuting new song titled "Forever I've Known", displaying what seems to be a darker, deeper sound for the band.

They played new songs "Child", "Feel to Follow", "Pelican", "Ayla", "Went Away", "Forever I've Known" and "Grew Up at Midnight" at The Wedgewood Rooms, Portsmouth on 8 August 2011.

On 4 October 2011, the band announced via their blog that their third album, Given to the Wild, would be released on 9 January 2012.

The first single from the album was "Pelican", it was first played on 15 November 2011 on BBC Radio 1 by Zane Lowe. It was released on 9 January 2012 to very favourable reviews, it currently holds a score of 72 on Metacritic. At the 58th Ivor Novello Awards, held at the Grosvenor House Hotel in London on 16 May 2013, "Pelican" won Best Contemporary Song.

The album was at No. 1 on the midweek chart update, at the end of the week it debuted No. 4 on the UK Album Chart, the highest Maccabees release to date there.

On 12 September 2012, the album was nominated for the 2012 Mercury Prize. On 24 October 2012, the album was certified gold in the UK.

In 2015 their song "Grew Up at Midnight" was featured in the film Steve Jobs.

=== 2014–2017: Marks to Prove It and break-up ===
In 2013 The Maccabees announced in an NME article that they were hoping to release a fourth album in early 2014. However, in January 2014 in another article with NME, guitarist Felix White stated, "We started the record at the beginning of 2013. We went into the studio with the idea that it was going to be finished by now. And we've finished two songs. We've got a lot of songs but every time you write something new, it raises the standard." Frontman Orlando Weeks added, "we haven't really come across the songs that set the tone or mood for this record yet, we're kind of shooting in the dark. But I like that: there isn't a specific thing I'm trying to funnel stuff into."

In March 2015, it was announced that The Maccabees were going to release new single "Marks To Prove It" on 11 May through Fiction Records. In May 2015, the band confirmed that Marks To Prove It would feature eleven tracks. The album was recorded in the band's studio in Elephant and Castle and pays tribute to the area.

On 18 May, the band announced that the album would be released on 31 July 2015. "Something Like Happiness" was released as the second single and streamed by the band on 11 June. It was released on 31 July, to coincide with the album.

In August 2016, the band released a statement stating that "After 14 years as a band we have decided to call it a day", with farewell shows to follow in summer 2017.

=== 2017–2024: Solo projects ===
For the first time in January 2018, the founding member and the producer for Maccabees, Hugo White, talked of his memorable time working with the Maccabees and his life as a music producer after the Maccabees disbanded.

On 17 August 2023, Felix White and Hugo White unveiled their first single, "Worn Out Buildings," as part of their new musical project, 86TVs. Band members included their younger brother, Will, and the drummer Jamie Morrison, known for his previous work with the bands Noisettes and Stereophonics. In June 2023, they signed with Parlophone Records.

Vocalist Orlando Weeks released three solo albums following the band's break-up: A Quickening (2020), Hop Up (2022) and LOJA (2024). Weeks also wrote the book, The Gritterman, released in 2017 with an accompanying soundtrack album narrated by actor and comedian Paul Whitehouse.

=== 2024–present: Reunion and future ===
On 23 October 2024, the band deleted previous social media posts and updated their logo, prompting speculation from fans and press of a reunion. Their website was updated with the new logo and a link to sign up to their mailing list for updates. The band confirmed their reunion on 28 October with the announcement that they would be headlining All Points East festival on 24 August 2025. During their reunion tour, they also headlined the Park Stage at Glastonbury Festival.

The band continued their reunion into 2026, announcing several more tour dates: "After we played at Glastonbury and All Points East this year, we thought that might just be it, but everyone had such a good time. It felt so euphoric, so why wouldn't we want to do that again!" On the subject of new music, guitarist Felix White noted: "The answer is, we don't know. Having those shows in next year means we've got enough time to think about it and see which way it's going to go. If The Maccabees keep going beyond that point, we'd want to feel like a functioning band that are making music and are there for a reason. [These gigs] will either be the last Maccabees shows, or we'll try and make some music and see where it goes".

White elaborated: "We're talking about [writing new music]. These shows will be amazing if we don't have new music, but then if something comes up, then it could be really wild. We haven't done the time in the room [yet], but we're talking about doing that. That's the next testing of how robust this situation is going to be moving into that. We're all nervous and a bit excited about what we could do there, but I guess we'll wait and see. We've cleared some time at the start of next year, so we'll see where we get to. The treacherous but exciting thing is that there is no plan. No one really knows, and we're just going to let it be whatever it is. So if it just happens that there is some special music that feels like the continuation of The Maccabees' story, then we'll do it."

== Members ==
- Orlando Weeks – vocals, guitar, keyboards (2004–2017; 2024–present)
- Felix White – guitars, piano, backing vocals (2004–2017; 2024–present)
- Hugo White – guitars, backing vocals (2004–2017; 2024–present)
- Rupert Jarvis – bass (2004–2017; 2024–present)
- Sam Doyle – drums (2008–2017; 2024–present)
- Will White – keyboards, synthesizer, samplers (2010–2013; 2017; 2024–present)

=== Former members ===
- Robert Dylan Thomas – drums (2004–2008)
- Elliott Andrews – drums (2006–2007)

== Discography ==
- Colour It In (2007)
- Wall of Arms (2009)
- Given to the Wild (2012)
- Marks to Prove It (2015)
