= ...There and Then =

Video by Oasis
- Released: 19 November 1996
- Recorded: 4 November 1995 – 28 April 1996
- Genre: Rock; britpop
- Length: 76:50
- Label: Sony Music Distribution

Oasis video chronology
Live by the Sea (1995)	...There and Then (1996)	Familiar to Millions (2000)

...There and Then is a live video consisting of footage taken from three of Oasis' biggest shows from the 1995–96 (What's the Story) Morning Glory? Tour. It was released first on VHS on 14 October 1996, then on DVD on 12 November 1997 and later re-released on DVD on 15 October 2001 which included bonus live audio tracks, and promo videos for "Roll with It" and "Acquiesce".

== Track list ==
All tracks are written by Noel Gallagher, except where noted.

No.	Title	Length
1.	"Programme Start"
2.	"The Swamp Song"	3:23
3.	"Acquiesce"	3:49
4.	"Supersonic"	4:41
5.	"Hello"	2:56
6.	"Some Might Say"	4:45
7.	"Roll with It"	3:47
8.	"Morning Glory" (Acoustic)	3:09
9.	"Round Are Way"	4:25
10.	"Cigarettes & Alcohol"	4:02
11.	"Champagne Supernova"	8:44
12.	"Cast No Shadow"	3:58
13.	"Wonderwall"	3:36
14.	"The Masterplan"	4:43
15.	"Don't Look Back in Anger"	4:23
16.	"Live Forever"	4:14
17.	"I Am the Walrus" (Lennon–McCartney)	6:45
18.	"Cum on Feel the Noize" (Holder, Lea)	5:30

Bonus tracks, 2001 DVD
No.	Title	Length
19.	"Roll with It"
20.	"Acquiesce"

=== Notes ===
- Tracks 2, 3, 6, 7, 9, 12, 13, 14, 15, 16 and 18 were recorded at Maine Road, Manchester, England on 28 April 1996
- Tracks 4, 5, 8, 10 and 11 were recorded at Earls Court, London, England on 4 November 1995
- Track 17 was recorded at Earls Court, London, England on 5 November 1995.

=== Bonus audio CD ===
Early copies of the VHS contained a bonus 3-track audio CD.

1. "Wonderwall" (Acoustic) (Recorded at Earls Court, London, England on 4 November 1995)
2. "Cigarettes & Alcohol" (Recorded at Maine Road, Manchester, England on 28 April 1996)
3. "Champagne Supernova" (featuring John Squire of the Stone Roses) (Recorded at Knebworth Park, Stevenage, Hertfordshire, England on 11 August 1996)

"Wonderwall" and "Champagne Supernova" were also included as bonus audio tracks on the ...There and Then DVD Reissue from 2001.

== Personnel ==
- Liam Gallagher – vocals
- Noel Gallagher – lead guitar, vocals
- Paul "Bonehead" Arthurs – rhythm guitar
- Paul McGuigan – bass guitar
- Alan White – drums, percussion

== Charts ==
Chart (1996)	Peak position
UK Music Videos (OCC)	1

== Certifications ==
Region	Certification	Certified units/sales
Argentina (CAPIF)	Platinum	8,000^{^}
United Kingdom (BPI)	8× Platinum	400,000^{*}
United States (RIAA)	Gold	50,000^{^}
^{*} Sales figures based on certification alone.^{^} Shipments figures based on certification alone.
