= Wonderwall =

1995 single by Oasis

Single by Oasis

from the album (What's the Story) Morning Glory?
- B-side: "Round Are Way"; "The Swamp Song"; "The Masterplan"
- Released: 30 October 1995
- Recorded: May 1995
- Studio: Rockfield (Rockfield, Wales)
- Genre: Alternative rock; Britpop; pop rock
- Length: 4:19 (album version); 3:48 (radio edit)
- Label: Creation
- Songwriter: Noel Gallagher
- Producers: Owen Morris; Noel Gallagher

Oasis singles chronology
"Morning Glory" (1995)	"Wonderwall" (1995)	"Don't Look Back in Anger" (1996)

Music video
- "Wonderwall" on YouTube

(What's the Story) Morning Glory? track listing
- 12 tracks: 1. "Hello"; 2. "Roll with It"; 3. "Wonderwall"; 4. "Don't Look Back in Anger"; 5. "Hey Now!"; 6. Untitled; 7. "Some Might Say"; 8. "Cast No Shadow"; 9. "She's Electric"; 10. "Morning Glory"; 11. Untitled; 12. "Champagne Supernova"

"Wonderwall" is a song by English rock band Oasis, released by Creation Records on 30 October 1995 as the fourth single (third released in the UK) from the band's second studio album (What's the Story) Morning Glory?. Described by lead guitarist and songwriter Noel Gallagher, who wrote the song and co-produced it with Owen Morris, as being about "an imaginary friend who's gonna come and save you from yourself", the song's title was inspired by George Harrison's solo album Wonderwall Music, and it was originally intended to be recorded on a wall outside Rockfield Studios, though this idea was shelved for a studio recording.

"Wonderwall" was a commercial success and is one of the band's most famous tracks. It reached the top 10 in 20 countries, topping the charts of Australia and New Zealand and peaking at No. 2 on both the UK Singles Chart and the Irish Singles Chart. In North America, it entered the top 10 in Canada and the United States, reaching No. 5 and No. 8, respectively, thus becoming the band's sole top-40 entry on the latter country's main Billboard Hot 100 chart, becoming their biggest US hit. The single was certified nine-times platinum by the British Phonographic Industry (BPI) and 12-times platinum by the Australian Recording Industry Association (ARIA). Its music video, directed by Nigel Dick, won British Video of the Year at the 1996 Brit Awards.

"Wonderwall" remains one of the band's most popular songs. In Australia, it was voted No. 1 on the alternative music radio station Triple J's Hottest 100 of 1995 and "20 Years of the Hottest 100" in 2013. Many artists have also covered the song, such as Ryan Adams, Cat Power, and Brad Mehldau. In October 2020, it became the first song from the 1990s to reach one billion streams on Spotify. It became the anthem for the England national football team during the 2026 FIFA World Cup.

== Inspiration and writing ==
The song was originally titled "Wishing Stone". Gallagher told NME in 1996 that "Wonderwall" was written for Meg Mathews, his then-girlfriend and later wife. However, after Gallagher and Mathews divorced in 2001, he said the song was not about her: "The meaning of that song was taken away from me by the media who jumped on it, and how do you tell your Mrs it's not about her once she's read it is? It's a song about an imaginary friend who's gonna come and save you from yourself." Liam Gallagher also said he feels the song is a callback to the time when he and his brother would write notes and thoughts on the wallpaper in their bedrooms as kids: "But obviously that wasn't meaningful enough for Noel ... so he decided to say it was about some girl." The song's final title was inspired by George Harrison's solo album Wonderwall Music.

== Recording and production ==
The song was originally planned to be recorded on a "ten foot" wall outside Rockfield Studios. A snippet of the original recording can be heard at the start of (What's the Story) Morning Glory?'s opening track "Hello" with birdsong in the background. In a documentary, Noel recalled: "I remember saying... I've got this song called Wonderwall – and I want to record it on a wall." This sparked an arrangement of ladders and microphones worth thousands of pounds built around the wall: "I remember a lot of sheep were watching me do Wonderwall, I don't know who was more freaked out, me or them".

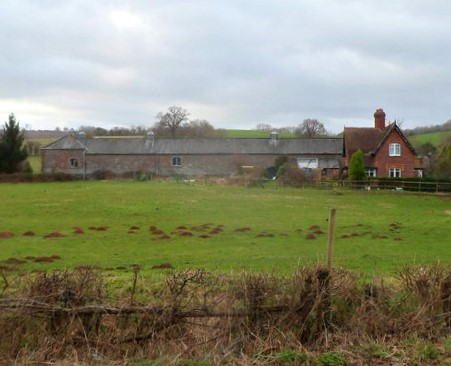
Rockfield Studios, where the song was recorded

In the end, the outdoor version was shelved for Liam to record his vocal in the studio instead. Recording took place during a two-week stint with the rest of the Morning Glory album in May 1995. Owen Morris produced the song in a half-day along with Gallagher, using a technique known as "brickwalling" to intensify the sound of the song. Liam Gallagher served as lead singer on the song after Noel had given him a choice between "Wonderwall" and "Don't Look Back in Anger", another single from the album, with Noel singing lead vocals on the latter. All of the band's members except bassist Paul "Guigsy" McGuigan contributed to the recording, with Noel playing bass instead of McGuigan. This decision displeased Liam, who told Morris, "That's not Oasis."

On the track, Paul "Bonehead" Arthurs plays a mellotron, a primitive analogue sampling keyboard invented in the 1960s. As Oasis looked back to the 1960s and 70s for inspiration, they drew from the Beatles which had popularised the instrument with their use of it on the song "Strawberry Fields Forever". The cello preset was used for the track. The root notes of the minor chord progression are played on repeat from around a minute into the song, and gives a mournful hum to bridge the dark overtones of the verse and brighter chorus.

Instead of normal drum sticks, Alan White used Pro-Mark Hot Rods which are made of multiple thin wooden rods strapped together, which provide a softer and more diffuse sound. As part of his What Makes This Song Great? series, Youtuber, musician and producer Rick Beato notes in his video about "Wonderwall" (around 5:00): "This is kind of what you do when you're in a rock band, and playing with sticks is too heavy for a section, but playing with brushes sounds too much like jazz and doesn't really carry the track enough."

"Wonderwall" is written in the key of F♯ minor and is set in common time with a moderate dance groove. Liam Gallagher's voice ranges from an E_{3} to an F♯_{4} in the song. With a capo on the second fret of the guitar, the song's main riff is Em7–G–Dsus4–A7sus4 as the third and fourth fingers are kept on the third frets of the top two strings.

== Live performances ==
Noel Gallagher debuted the song on UK television backstage at Glastonbury, and it was broadcast on Channel 4 on 24 June 1995. The song was not performed by the band during their headline performance the night before. The song went on to be regularly played on the (What's the Story) Morning Glory? Tour where it was typically played and sung solo by Noel acoustically. On occasions however (including the Maine Road and Knebworth gigs) it was played by the full band acoustically with Liam on vocals. This song was also performed during the 2012 Summer Olympics closing ceremony by Liam Gallagher and his post-Oasis band Beady Eye.

Since Oasis split up, both Noel and Liam have continued to play the song as part of Noel Gallagher's High Flying Birds and Liam's solo career, respectively. Both have often varied the presentation of the song, sometimes being performed in stripped down acoustic versions, whilst other times more full band arrangements have been performed. It was also played during their reunion tour in 2025.

== Critical reception ==
The song was received generally well by critics. In 1995, Steve Baltin from Cash Box named "Wonderwall" Pick of the Week, describing the song as "a perfect example of melodic pop." He added, "Following the more uptempo riff of 'Morning Glory', this single will remind listeners of the anthemic single 'Live Forever', a track that generated massive airplay on multiple formats last year. Look for the same results for this lovely near ballad. A simple, sweet song, it shows why Oasis is rapidly becoming one of music's great singles bands." Kevin Courtney from Irish Times declared it as a "genuine Oasis gem", "with its aching string arrangements and evocative vocals".

Michael Bonner from Melody Maker named it Single of the Week, praising it as "a mesmeric declaration of love — haunting, beautiful and effortlessly simple — and, unless you've been locked in a coal cellar for the last two months, you should know it forwards, backwards and sideways by now", while another Melody Maker editor, David Stubbs, took a negative view of the song – "'Wonderwall', with its explicit George Harrison reference, doesn't bother to conceal another nod at The Beatles, but the real problem here is that Liam doesn't seem capable of modulating his voice to suit the pensively orchestrated backdrop — a bit of a subtlety deficiency."

Pan-European magazine Music & Media wrote, "A swirling rock song that slowly builds to epic proportions. Nicely chiming acoustic guitars and psyched-up strings support Liam Gallagher's trademark declamatory and plaintive vocals. Not the easiest song for EHR, but a sure grower." John Robinson from NME commented, "'Wonderwall' instead turns out to be the best example of Liam's indispensability to Noel as we are plunged into the depths of a doomed urban romance. Fires have gone out, wills to live have departed, yet we still witness Liam questioning whether Maybe you could be the one to save me. And yet the entirely twisted delivery turns it from a slightly sappy idea into a fantastically bleak song, adding an all-consuming anger to the sense of desperation." In a separate review, Robinson felt it "is one of Oasis' best records because it manages to be immensely robust while still being one of Noel's most lyrically personal songs". Andrew Harrison from Select wrote, "'Wonderwall' is a near acoustic song that wears many signs of its maturity, but heavily. There is a (good) attempt to resonate personal failure with the redemptive power of The Beatles ("Backbeat, the word is on the street/That the fire in your eyes is out"). Liam goes flat once too often on the chorus." Leesa Daniels from Smash Hits gave it a top score of five out of five and named it "Oasis' version of a love song." She added, "Absolutely beautiful." Another Smash Hits editor, Mark Frith, praised it as a highlight of the album, "mid-paced, brilliantly sung by Liam and, if it wasn't for Queen ['Heaven for Everyone'], a No. 1 hit!"

== Cover art and release ==
The sleeve artwork was inspired by the paintings of the Belgian surrealist René Magritte, and was shot on Primrose Hill in London by Michael Spencer Jones. The hand holding the frame is that of art director Brian Cannon. The original idea was to have Liam in the frame before Noel vetoed that idea whilst the shoot was taking place. Noel stumbled across the photo shoot while on his way to Creation Records in a cab. He started shouting and eventually got out of the cab to confront Jones, who explained they were shooting the cover to "Wonderwall". Noel replied: "What, with our fucking kid [Liam] on the cover? I don't think so. It's a fucking love song. There's no way our kid's going on the fucking cover. You're all wasting your time," before getting back in the cab.

The shoot was rescheduled for the next day, and it was decided a female figure was necessary. A Creation Records employee, Anita Heryet was asked to stand inside the frame. Jones shot the photo on infrared black and white film: "So you create another layer. Suddenly she becomes part of the environment. It goes to a situation where you're not looking at her, as the viewer – she’s looking at you, which is the way I wanted it to be. It worked. The cover to 'Wonderwall' is one of my favourites."

The single was released on 30 October 1995, with B-sides of "Round Are Way", "The Swamp Song" and "The Masterplan". It was also featured on Oasis' second album, (What's the Story) Morning Glory? released earlier in the same month. It was the fourth single of the album.

== Music video ==
Liam Gallagher looks into the camera with lights reflecting off his glasses, in the black and white music video

The original music video to the song conceived by Johanna Bautista was filmed by British music video and film director Nigel Dick at Unit 217B in Woolwich, London, on 30 September 1995. The filming of the promotional video took place during the brief period when bassist Guigsy quit the band due to nervous exhaustion, and was replaced by Scott McLeod, who appears in the video along with the four other members of the band. The song won British Video of the Year at the 1996 Brit Awards.

== In popular culture ==
In 1996, Oasis refused permission to have a parody by The Smurfs called "Wondersmurf" be released.

The song is used by several association football clubs. It is used by Minnesota United of the MLS as its team song. The club's overarching fan organisation is called MNWonderwall. "Wonderwall" is also played after all Manchester City F.C. home games. "Wonderwall" is the pre-match song for Australian A-League Men side Adelaide United. During the 2026 FIFA World Cup, it was sung by supporters of the England national football team after every win.

On 7 April 2011, Mr. 305 artist Jamie Drastik released the song "Save Me" which heavily samples "Wonderwall". It is the lead single from Jamie's mixtape Champagne and Cocaine. The song also features a verse from Drastik's mentor and Mr. 305 boss Pitbull. Drastik performed "Save Me" all around the world, including on the Planet Pit World Tour. The song achieved major radio success all across the US. It is currently the most popular song from Champagne and Cocaine. A part of the song can be heard during the final episode of the BBC series Ashes to Ashes on a Betamax video showing how WPC Shaz Granger died in 1995.

=== Meme ===
The song has become the subject of various memes in the decades after its release. The phrase "Anyway, here's Wonderwall" originated in a 2013 video, which has amassed almost 500,000 views as of 2026. The phrase, which has been used in subsequent memes essentially pokes fun at the ubiquity of the song in every guitarist's repertoire due to its simplicity. Christopher Hill argues in The Voice Mag: "The Wonderwall meme isn't about the song; it's about the player ... there is an implied discouragement of new guitarists from trying to learn the piece: it becomes a 'cringe' activity." Some guitar stores have banned people playing "Wonderwall" like other popular hits such as "Stairway to Heaven", "Smoke on the Water" and "Seven Nation Army".

== Chart and sales performance ==
"Wonderwall" reached the No. 2 spot in both Ireland and the United Kingdom in October and November 1995. It finished at No. 10 on the year-end chart for 1995. The track has sold and streamed 4.8 million units in the UK as of November 2024, certifying the song nine-times platinum and making it Oasis' biggest-selling song in their homeland. In August 2024, in light of the announcement of the band's reunion tour, "Wonderwall" re-entered at number 17 on the UK Singles Chart. On 5 September 2025, the song spent its 100th week on the UK chart.

In the United States, the song peaked at No. 1 on the Modern Rock Tracks chart for a then-unprecedented ten weeks and reached No. 8 on the Billboard Hot 100 in March 1996, becoming their only top-10 hit on the latter chart. It has sold 2.9 million copies in the US as of July 2026. "Wonderwall" also proved to be a major hit in Australia and New Zealand, claiming the No. 1 spot in both countries. In Canada, the song reached No. 5 on the RPM 100 chart and topped the RPM Alternative 30 ranking. In October 2020, it became the first song from the 1990s to reach one billion streams on Spotify.

== Awards and accolades ==
- The American magazine The Village Voice's Pazz & Jop critics' poll ranked "Wonderwall" at No. 11 on its annual year-end poll in 1995. The following year, "Wonderwall" was ranked at No. 4, tied with Pulp's "Common People".
- In the Grammy Awards of 1997, the band received a nomination for Best Rock Vocal Performance by a Duo or Group, and Noel Gallagher picked up an additional nomination for Best Rock Song, winning neither.
- In May 2005, "Wonderwall" was voted the best British song of all time, in a poll of over 8,500 listeners conducted by Virgin Radio.
- In August 2006, "Wonderwall" was named the second-greatest song of all time in a poll conducted by Q Magazine, finishing behind another Oasis song, "Live Forever".
- In 2006, U2's guitarist The Edge named "Wonderwall" one of the songs he most wishes he'd written.
- In May 2007, NME magazine placed "Wonderwall" at No. 27 on its list of the 50 Greatest Indie Anthems Ever.
- On 28 June 2007, NME stated that Alex James, bassist of Blur, who had been long-standing rivals with Oasis, said: "Wish I'd written it. He's got a great voice, Liam (Gallagher)".
- In July 2009, "Wonderwall" was voted at No. 12 in the Hottest 100 of all time countdown poll, conducted by Australian radio station Triple J. More than half a million votes were cast.
- In Australia, it was voted No. 1 on the alternative music radio station Triple J's Hottest 100 of 1995 and "20 Years of the Hottest 100" in 2013.
- In February 2014, the song was voted No. 36 of The 500 greatest songs of all time, according to NME.
- In March 2016, "Wonderwall" was voted the greatest British song of all time by Radio X listeners.
- In September 2021, Rolling Stone placed the song at No. 95 on its list of the 500 Greatest Songs of All Time.

== Track listings ==
All tracks are written by Noel Gallagher, except where noted.

UK single
No.	Title	Length
1.	"Wonderwall"	4:18
2.	"Round Are Way"	5:42
3.	"The Swamp Song"	4:19
4.	"The Masterplan"	5:23
Total length:		19:52

US single
No.	Title	Length
1.	"Wonderwall"	4:14
2.	"Round Are Way"	5:41
3.	"Talk Tonight"	4:11
4.	"Rockin' Chair"	4:33
5.	"I Am the Walrus (Live Glasgow Cathouse June 1994)" (Beatles cover)	8:14
Total length:		26:53

== Personnel ==
Oasis

- Liam Gallagher – vocals, tambourine
- Noel Gallagher – acoustic and electric guitars, bass, piano
- Paul "Bonehead" Arthurs – Mellotron (cello)
- Alan White – drums

Additional performer

- Owen Morris – Kurzweil strings

== Charts ==
=== Weekly charts ===
Chart (1995–1996)	Peak position
Australia (ARIA)	1
Austria (Ö3 Austria Top 40)	6
Belgium (Ultratop 50 Wallonia)	7
Belgium (Ultratop 50 Flanders)	7
Canada Retail Singles (The Record)	28
Canada Hit Parade (The Record)	3
Canada Contemporary Hit Radio (The Record)	1
Canada Top Singles (RPM)	5
Canada Rock/Alternative (RPM)	1
Denmark (Tracklisten)	9
El Salvador (El Siglo de Torreón)	7
Estonia (Eesti Top 20)	20
Europe (Eurochart Hot 100)	8
Europe (European AC Radio)	13
Europe (European Alternative Rock Radio)	1
Europe (European Hit Radio)	3
Finland (Suomen virallinen lista)	11
France (SNEP)	10
Germany (GfK)	17
Hungary (Mahasz)	8
Iceland (Íslenski Listinn Topp 40)	2
Ireland (IRMA)	2
Israel (IBA)	4
Italy (Musica e dischi)	14
Italy Airplay (Music & Media)	8
Netherlands (Dutch Top 40)	9
Netherlands (Single Top 100)	8
New Zealand (Recorded Music NZ)	1
Norway (VG-lista)	5
Scottish Singles Sales (Official Charts)	2
Sweden (Sverigetopplistan)	12
Switzerland (Schweizer Hitparade)	17
UK Singles (Official Charts)	2
UK Airplay (Music Week)	1
UK Indie (Music Week)	1
US Billboard Hot 100	8
US Adult Alternative Airplay (Billboard)	5
US Adult Contemporary (Billboard)	36
US Adult Pop Airplay (Billboard)	30
US Alternative Airplay (Billboard)	1
US Dance Singles Sales (Billboard)	17
US Mainstream Rock (Billboard)	9
US Pop Airplay (Billboard)	10
US Cash Box Top 100	6
Zimbabwe (ZIMA)	9

Chart (2024–2026)	Peak position
Argentina Hot 100 (Billboard)	36
Australia (ARIA)	55
Bolivia (Billboard)	4
Brazil Hot 100 (Billboard)	25
Chile (Billboard)	13
Colombia Hot 100 (Billboard)	85
Croatia International Airplay (Top lista)	58
Czech Republic Singles Digital (ČNS IFPI)	17
Ecuador Streaming (Promúsica)	2
Global 200 (Billboard)	4
Greece International (IFPI)	27
Iceland (Billboard)	16
Ireland (IRMA)	10
Israel (Mako Hitlist)	77
Italy (FIMI)	27
Japan Hot Overseas (Billboard Japan)	11
Lithuania (AGATA)	94
Luxembourg (Billboard)	15
Panama Streaming (PRODUCE)	14
Peru Streaming (Promúsica)	3
Portugal (AFP)	9
Slovakia Singles Digital (ČNS IFPI)	50
Spain (Promusicae)	26
Sweden (Sverigetopplistan)	3
UK Singles (Official Charts)	2
US Billboard Hot 100	27
US Hot Rock & Alternative Songs (Billboard)	6

=== Monthly charts ===
Monthly chart performance
Chart (2026)	Peak position
Brazil Streaming (Pro-Música Brasil)	47
Panama Streaming (PRODUCE)	40

=== Year-end charts ===
Chart (1995)	Position
Europe (European Alternative Rock Radio)	24
Iceland (Íslenski Listinn Topp 40)	28
Sweden (Topplistan)	82
UK Singles (OCC)	10
UK Airplay (Music Week)	45

Chart (1996)	Position
Australia (ARIA)	19
Belgium (Ultratop 50 Flanders)	37
Belgium (Ultratop 50 Wallonia)	38
Brazil (Crowley)	16
Canada Top Singles (RPM)	26
Canada Rock/Alternative (RPM)	2
Europe (Eurochart Hot 100)	31
Europe (European Hit Radio)	39
Germany (Media Control)	80
Israel (IBA)	5
Netherlands (Dutch Top 40)	52
Netherlands (Single Top 100)	98
New Zealand (RIANZ)	29
Sweden (Topplistan)	90
UK Singles (OCC)	51
UK Airplay (Music Week)	28
US Billboard Hot 100	56
US Mainstream Rock Tracks (Billboard)	38
US Modern Rock Tracks (Billboard)	6
US Top 40/Mainstream (Billboard)	43

Chart (2018)	Position
Portugal (AFP)	168

Chart (2019)	Position
Portugal (AFP)	177

Chart (2021)	Position
UK Singles (OCC)	76

Chart (2022)	Position
UK Singles (OCC)	80

Chart (2023)	Position
UK Singles (OCC)	78

Chart (2024)	Position
UK Singles (OCC)	75

Chart (2025)	Position
UK Singles (OCC)	86

=== Decade-end charts ===
Chart (2010–2019)	Position
UK Singles (OCC)	78

== Certifications ==
Region	Certification	Certified units/sales
Australia (ARIA)	14× Platinum	980,000^{‡}
Brazil (Pro-Música Brasil)	Diamond	250,000^{‡}
Denmark (IFPI Danmark)	2× Platinum	180,000^{‡}
Germany (BVMI)	2× Platinum	1,200,000^{‡}
Italy (FIMI) sales since 2009	4× Platinum	280,000^{‡}
Mexico (AMPROFON)	2× Diamond+3× Platinum	780,000^{‡}
New Zealand (RMNZ)	8× Platinum	240,000^{‡}
Norway (IFPI Norway)	Gold	
Portugal (AFP)	5× Platinum	50,000^{‡}
Spain (Promusicae)	4× Platinum	240,000^{‡}
United Kingdom (BPI)	9× Platinum	5,600,000
United States (RIAA)	Gold	2,900,000
Streaming
Greece (IFPI Greece)	2× Platinum	4,000,000^{†}
^{*} Sales figures based on certification alone.^{‡} Sales+streaming figures based on certification alone.^{†} Streaming-only figures based on certification alone.

== Release history ==
Region	Date	Format(s)	Label(s)	Ref(s).
United Kingdom	30 October 1995	7-inch vinyl; CD; cassette	Creation	
United Kingdom	6 November 1995	12-inch vinyl	Creation	
United States	14 November 1995	Contemporary hit radio	Epic	
Australia	20 November 1995	CD; cassette	Creation	
Japan	23 November 1995	CD	Epic	

== The Mike Flowers Pops version ==
"Wonderwall"

Single by the Mike Flowers Pops

from the album A Groovy Place
- B-side: "Son of God"; "Theme from Memory Man"
- Released: 18 December 1995
- Genre: Easy listening
- Length: 2:40
- Label: London
- Songwriter: Noel Gallagher
- Producers: Adrian Johnston; Mike Roberts

The Mike Flowers Pops singles chronology
"Wonderwall" (1995)	"Light My Fire" / "Please Release Me" (1996)

Music video
- "Wonderwall" on YouTube

British band the Mike Flowers Pops released an easy listening version of "Wonderwall" that reached No. 2 on the UK Singles Chart—just as the Oasis original had done two months earlier—during Christmas 1995. On New Year's Day 1996, it earned a silver certification from the British Phonographic Industry (BPI) for shipments exceeding 200,000 copies. This cover also peaked within the top 10 of the charts in Denmark, Ireland and Sweden.

Noel Gallagher mentioned that when BBC Radio 1 premiered the song, they jokingly claimed that they had found "the original version of Wonderwall". Gallagher, who had been in America at the time, was surprised to be asked by one of his record company's executives if he had actually written the song.

=== Charts ===
==== Weekly charts ====
Chart (1995–1996)	Peak position
Australia (ARIA)	48
Denmark (IFPI)	5
Europe (Eurochart Hot 100)	8
Iceland (Íslenski listinn Topp 40)	18
Ireland (IRMA)	10
Netherlands (Single Top 100)	40
New Zealand (Recorded Music NZ)	29
Norway (VG-lista)	13
Scottish Singles Sales (Official Charts)	1
Sweden (Sverigetopplistan)	5
UK Singles (Official Charts)	2

==== Year-end charts ====
Chart (1995)	Position
UK Singles (OCC)	47

=== Certifications ===
Region	Certification	Certified units/sales
United Kingdom (BPI)	Silver	200,000^{^}
^{^} Shipments figures based on certification alone.

== Bring Me the Horizon version ==
"Wonderwall"

Single by Bring Me the Horizon

from the album Spotify Singles
- Released: 30 January 2025
- Length: 4:00
- Label: Sony; RCA
- Songwriter: Noel Gallagher
- Producers: Dan Lancaster; Oliver Sykes

Bring Me the Horizon singles chronology
"Top 10 Statues That Cried Blood" (2024)	"Wonderwall" (2025)	"Slave to the Rithm" (2026)

Music video
- "Wonderwall" on YouTube

British rock band Bring Me the Horizon released a cover of "Wonderwall" as part of the Spotify Singles series, putting their own metal twist on the song in 2025. Frontman Liam Gallagher responded to the cover positively, calling it "absolutely incredible". When interviewed at the BRIT Awards, the band responded to Gallagher's positive reception to their rendition, stating they were "surprised" and expected him to "slag it off". They also revealed that they wanted to cover "Wonderwall" because it was one of Sykes' favourite songs. All royalties generated from the song's streams were donated to the Teenage Cancer Trust.

It peaked at number 30 on the UK Rock & Metal Singles Chart and number 11 on the US Hot Hard Rock Songs chart.

=== Track listing ===
Spotify Singles
No.	Title	Writer(s)	Length
1.	"Wonderwall - Spotify Singles"	Noel Gallagher	3:43
2.	"Youtopia - Spotify Singles" (Earthcore remix)	Oliver Sykes; Lee Malia; Matt Nicholls; Zakk Cervini; Sione Teumohenga; Daisuke Ehara
Total length:			7:40

=== Lyric video ===
A lyric video was released alongside the song, exclusively to Spotify Premium users. It was later published to YouTube, on 13 February 2025. It parodies the original Oasis music video and a still frame of it serves as the single's cover art.

=== Charts ===
Chart performance for "Wonderwall"
Chart (2025)	Peak position
UK Rock & Metal (OCC)	30
US Hot Hard Rock Songs (Billboard)	11

== Other cover versions ==
Many artists have also covered the song, such as Ryan Adams, Cat Power, and Brad Mehldau. Ryan Adams' version, first performed in 2001, and later released in 2003 on Love Is Hell pt. 1 EP, was well received by Noel Gallagher. It was featured in The O.C. episode "The Heartbreak". It was featured in the final scenes of the Smallville Season 3 episode "Velocity" and the first season of the Israeli documentary series Couchsurfers. In an interview with Spin, Gallagher said "I think Ryan Adams is the only person who ever got that song right."

Paul Anka covered the song on his swing album Rock Swings, released in 2005 and was used as figure skater Paul Fentz's backing track during his 2018 Winter Olympics performance in Pyeongchang, South Korea. This version sparked an internet meme at the time.

American rapper Jay-Z often has his crowds sing "Wonderwall" after his song "Jockin' Jay-Z", which includes a reference to Noel Gallagher's criticism of the rapper's involvement in the typically rock-centric Glastonbury Festival in 2008. It launched a war of words between Jay-Z and Oasis, with Oasis' rhythm guitarist Gem Archer describing Jay Z's actions as akin to an "eight-year-old girl". After Oasis broke up, Jay Z later claimed he would like to work with Liam Gallagher.

=== Mashups ===
"Wonderwall" was featured in the popular mashup "Boulevard of Broken Songs" mixed by Party Ben in late 2004, which also contained parts of both Travis's "Writing to Reach You" (which contains the line "Radio is playing all the usual / what's a Wonderwall anyway?") and Green Day's "Boulevard of Broken Dreams". In late 2006, Gallagher accused Green Day of 'ripping off' "Wonderwall", saying "If you listen, you'll find it is exactly the same arrangement as "Wonderwall". They should have the decency to wait until I am dead [before stealing my songs]. I, at least, pay the people I steal from that courtesy".

Neil Cicierega's mashup albums Mouth Silence and Mouth Moods feature tracks that are mashups of "Wonderwall" titled "Wndrwll" and "Wallspin", the former a humorous remix featuring "Everywhere You Look" and the latter a mashup with "You Spin Me Round (Like A Record)".

== See also ==
- List of best-selling singles in Australia
- List of number-one singles in Australia during the 1990s
- List of RPM Rock/Alternative number-one singles (Canada)
- List of number-one singles in 1996 (New Zealand)
- Number one modern rock hits of 1995
- Number one modern rock hits of 1996
