= (What's the Story) Morning Glory? =

1995 studio album by Oasis

Studio album by Oasis
- Released: 2 October 1995
- Recorded: February – June 1995
- Studios: Rockfield (Rockfield, Wales)
- Genres: Britpop; rock
- Length: 50:06
- Label: Creation
- Producers: Owen Morris; Noel Gallagher

Oasis chronology
Definitely Maybe (1994)	(What's the Story) Morning Glory? (1995)	Be Here Now (1997)

Singles from (What's the Story) Morning Glory?
- 1. "Some Might Say" Released: 24 April 1995; 2. "Roll with It" Released: 14 August 1995; 3. "Morning Glory" Released: 18 September 1995; 4. "Wonderwall" Released: 30 October 1995; 5. "Don't Look Back in Anger" Released: 19 February 1996; 6. "Champagne Supernova" Released: 13 May 1996

Alternative cover
- 30th anniversary edition cover

(What's the Story) Morning Glory? is the second studio album by the English rock band Oasis. Released on 2 October 1995 by Creation Records, it was produced by Owen Morris and the group's lead guitarist and songwriter Noel Gallagher. The structure and arrangement style of the album was a significant departure from the band's previous album, Definitely Maybe (1994). Gallagher's compositions were more focused in balladry and placed more emphasis on "huge" choruses and string arrangements. Morning Glory was the group's first album with drummer Alan White, who replaced Tony McCarroll (though McCarroll still appeared on the album, drumming on the track "Some Might Say").

The album propelled Oasis from being a crossover indie act to a worldwide rock phenomenon, and is seen by critics as a significant record in the timeline of British indie music. Morning Glory sold a record-breaking 345,000 copies in its first week in the UK before going on to spend 10 weeks at number one on the UK Albums Chart. It was also the band's breakthrough in the United States, reaching number four on the US Billboard 200 and being certified 4× platinum by the Recording Industry Association of America (RIAA). The album yielded four major hit singles in the band's native Britain: "Some Might Say" and "Don't Look Back in Anger" reached number one, and "Roll with It" and "Wonderwall" peaked at number two; the latter has emerged as the band's biggest-selling UK hit, spending 30 consecutive weeks on the chart. "Champagne Supernova" and "Wonderwall" reached number one on the Billboard Alternative Songs chart. At the 1996 Brit Awards, the album won Best British Album. Over several months in 1995 and 1996, the band supported the album with an extensive world tour, which saw them play to among the largest audiences ever at the time.

Although a commercial success, its initial critical reception was lukewarm; many reviewers deemed it inferior to Definitely Maybe, criticising the songwriting and production. However, critical opinion of the album reversed dramatically in the ensuing months and years, with critics recognising its strengths and its "populist appeal". Despite some views since that the album is overrated, Morning Glory is still considered a seminal record of both the Britpop era and the 1990s in general. It has appeared on several lists of the greatest albums in rock music, and at the 2010 Brit Awards, it was named the greatest British album since 1980. It has sold over 22 million copies worldwide, making it one of the best-selling albums of all time. As of July 2025, the album has been certified 19× platinum by the British Phonographic Industry (BPI) for earning 5.3 million units in the United Kingdom. In July 2026, the Official Charts Company certified (What's the Story) Morning Glory? as the best-selling studio album in UK history with 6.2 million units.

== Background and recording ==
"Some Might Say" was the first track written and recorded for Morning Glory, with recording taking place between 24 and 26 February 1995 at Loco Studios in Wales. The track proved problematic to record: the backing track was recorded in one take after Noel Gallagher and Morris drunkenly listened to the demo and decided the new version was played too fast, and Noel woke the rest of the band to re-record it. The backing track was faster than intended, with what Morris described as "a really bad speed up during the first three bars of the first chorus", but the take had to be used because those involved were impressed with Liam Gallagher's vocals, and Morris had to mix the track three times, using delay and other processing to hide the mistakes. The single was released on 24 April and went in at number one on the UK Singles Chart a week later; that same day, original Oasis drummer Tony McCarroll's departure was announced on their website.

By 2 May 1995, the band had found a replacement in Alan White, and six days later Oasis began recording Morning Glory at Rockfield Studios in Wales, with Owen Morris and Noel Gallagher producing. By the time they had finished in June 1995, Oasis were on the brink of becoming one of the most popular bands in the UK; the August 1995 "Battle of Britpop", in which Oasis and Blur had a chart battle over their respective singles "Roll with It" and "Country House" would propel them to mainstream awareness.

Despite the friction between the Gallagher brothers, Owen Morris reflected in 2010 that: "The sessions were the best, easiest, least fraught, most happily creative time I've ever had in a recording studio. I believe people can feel and hear when music is dishonest and motivated by the wrong reasons. Morning Glory, for all its imperfection and flaws, is dripping with love and happiness." Paul Weller joined them in the studio and provided lead guitar and backing vocals for "Champagne Supernova", and harmonica for the two untitled tracks known as "The Swamp Song". Noel wrote the last song for the album, "Cast No Shadow", on the train as he returned to the studio; the track was written for his good friend Richard Ashcroft.

Morris claimed the album was recorded in 15 days, at a pace of one song a day, with the first five tracks recorded being "Roll with It", "Hello", "Wonderwall", "Don't Look Back in Anger" and most of "Champagne Supernova", respectively. When the album was finished, Morris said it would "wipe the field with any competition ... It's astonishing. It's the Bollocks for this decade." Creation Records boss Alan McGee was similarly enthused, saying that "You just cannot slag this record. It's gonna speak to real, working-class lads in a way that a Suede or Radiohead could only dream of doing." The album's title was inspired by Noel's friend Melissa Lim answering the phone with the phrase, which is itself derived from a line in the song "The Telephone Hour" from the film Bye Bye Birdie.

The brickwall mastering technique used during the recording of the album has led to some journalists claiming that it was responsible for initiating the loudness war, as its heavy use of compression, first widely used by Morris on Definitely Maybe, was leaps and bounds beyond what any other album up until then had attempted. Music journalist Nick Southall, who has written extensively on the loudness war, commented, "If there's a jump-the-shark moment as far as CD mastering goes then it's probably Oasis." In Britpop and the English Music Tradition, Andy Bennett and Jon Stratton noted that as a result of this technique "the songs were especially loud. [Liam] Gallagher's voice is foregrounded to the point that it appears to grow out of the mixes of the songs, exposing itself to execute a pseudo-live quality."

== Composition ==
The music on (What's the Story) Morning Glory? has been characterised by commentators as rock, and Oasis as an essential part of Britpop culture. Music critic John Harris commented in his music history Britpop!: Cool Britannia and the Spectacular Demise of English Rock that much of the music seemed to be "little more inspired than a string of musical hand-me-downs". Among the musical cues Harris noted on the album were Gary Glitter's "Hello, Hello, I'm Back Again", John Lennon's "Imagine" ("Don't Look Back in Anger"), the theme to the 1970s children's programme You and Me and the Beatles' "With a Little Help from My Friends" ("She's Electric"), and the influence of R.E.M.'s "The One I Love" on "Morning Glory". One song, "Step Out", bore such a close resemblance to the song "Uptight (Everything's Alright)" by Stevie Wonder that it was removed from the album shortly before release due to the threat of legal action. Musicologist Allan F. Moore compares "She's Electric" to the Beatles' "When I'm Sixty-Four", writing that both songs can be claimed by an older generation.

In Britpop ..., Bennett and Stratton analysed Liam Gallagher's vocal style in significant detail, stressing its importance to the songs of the album; "[Liam's] Mancunian accent blends into a register and timbre that works the gestural contours of the melody and lyrics." Bennett and Stratton went on to conclude that Liam's 'over-personalized' style on songs such as "Wonderwall" resulted in "a beautiful sense of sentimentality that bespeaks the despondency of a generation. This occurs through the narrative structure of the song, vocal production, and the conventions of the singer's cultural context." Music critic Derek B. Scott remarked "a Beatles-influenced vocal harmony that includes falsetto and echoing of words is heard in 'Cast No Shadow'".

Noel Gallagher summed up his own perspective on the album's aesthetic in an interview with Rolling Stone in 1995; "Whilst [Definitely Maybe] is about dreaming of being a pop star in a band, What's the Story is about actually being a pop star in a band." The album has a notable anthemic theme to its songs, differing from the raw-edged rock of Definitely Maybe. The use of string arrangements and more varied instrumentation in songs such as "Don't Look Back in Anger" and "Champagne Supernova" was a significant departure from the band's debut. This style had first been implemented by the band on their fifth single, "Whatever", released in December 1994. It was produced in conjunction with the London Symphony Orchestra, resulting in a much more pop-oriented and mellower sound; this would be the template that would come to define many of the songs on What's the Story. In the BBC documentary Seven Ages of Rock, former NME chief editor Steve Sutherland noted that "with Morning Glory, [Noel] began to take seriously the notion of being the voice of a generation".

== Cover ==
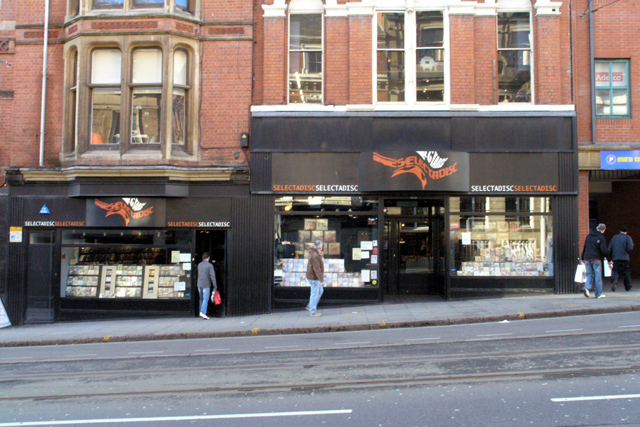
The cover features the London branch of Nottingham-based record store chain Selectadisc (Nottingham branch pictured).

The cover is a picture of two men passing each other on Berwick Street in London. The two men are London DJ Sean Rowley (facing the camera) and album sleeve designer Brian Cannon (back to the camera). The album's producer Owen Morris can be seen in the background, on the left footpath, holding a box containing the album's master tape in front of his face. The location was chosen because the street was a popular location for record shops at the time. The cover cost £25,000 to produce. In the documentary Squaring the Circle: The Story of Hipgnosis, Noel Gallagher expresses his displeasure with the cover, admitting that he had not paid enough attention to the art design process. Long after the album's release, he recalls asking "Who okayed that [cover]?" Only to be told "Er, you did."

== Promotion ==
While "Some Might Say", a number one hit, had been released in April, the single chosen to precede the album's release was "Roll with It", planned for release on 14 August, six weeks before the album was due to hit the shelves. This was an unorthodox method for the time, contrasting the standard industry procedure of releasing the lead single three weeks before its parent album. Blur's management had become worried that this would hinder the chances of the group's forthcoming "Country House" single reaching number one the following week. As a reaction, Food Records pushed the release of "Country House" back a week. The NME hailed this oncoming chart battle as a "British Heavyweight Championship" between the two bands and thus started what became known as "The Battle of Britpop".

The event triggered an unprecedented amount of exposure for both bands in national newspapers and on television news bulletins, supposedly symbolising the battle between the middle class of the south and the working class of the north. In the midst of the battle a Guardian newspaper headline proclaimed "Working Class Heroes Lead Art School Trendies". "Country House" outsold "Roll with It" by 54,000 and topped the singles chart for a fortnight. Overall singles sales that week were up by 41 per cent. In 2005, John Harris reflected on the importance of the event in popularising Britpop; "(as) Blur's "Country House" raced Oasis' "Roll with It" to the top of the charts, just about every voice in the media felt compelled to express an opinion on the freshly inaugurated age of Britpop."

During a promotional interview in September, the month before the album was released, Noel spoke about the rivalry with Damon Albarn and Alex James from Blur, and was quoted in the 17 September edition of The Observer saying he hoped "the pair of them would catch AIDS and die because I fucking hate them two." Although Noel recanted and said that AIDS is no laughing matter, the quote caused a storm of controversy, with Noel having to write a letter of apology; he later confessed that "my whole world came crashing down in on me then". However, in an interview with The Guardian in 2005, Blur's guitarist Graham Coxon said that he bore no malice towards Oasis. "At least they were outright about it. They weren't pretending to like us and then slagging us off, which is what we'd been used to. In that way, I quite appreciated them."

== Release ==
(What's the Story) Morning Glory? was released on 2 October 1995. The album sold quickly; the Daily Express reported the day after release that central London HMV stores were selling copies at a rate of two per minute. At the end of the first week of sales, the album had sold a record-breaking 345,000 copies, making it (at the time) the second-fastest-selling album in British history, behind Michael Jackson's Bad.

After the fourth single from the album, "Wonderwall", hit the top ten in several countries, including stays at number one in Australia and New Zealand and achieving a peak of number eight in the United States, the album began to enjoy prolonged international success. Eventually, the album had a five-week run at the top of the Australian albums chart and an eight-week run at the top of the New Zealand albums chart before topping charts in Canada, Ireland, Sweden and Switzerland. The album was also making significant waves in the US market, thanks in part to the success of the "Wonderwall" and "Champagne Supernova" singles on American modern rock radio. Both songs reached number one on the Modern Rock Tracks chart and stayed there for ten and five weeks respectively. By early 1996, What's the Story was selling 200,000 copies a week, eventually peaking at number four and being certified four times platinum by the end of the year for shipments of over four million units. "Wonderwall" also topped the Australian and New Zealand singles charts.

=== Battle of Britpop ===
The album's release alongside Blur's The Great Escape came at the height of the so-called "Battle of Britpop". Despite some genuine enmity between the two bands, this was a primarily media-constructed pitting of the more classic rock-focused, working-class northern band Oasis against the middle-class, musically more eclectic Blur. Released around the same time as (What's the Story?) Morning Glory, The Great Escape was initially widely praised by critics, far more so than Oasis' effort. However, as Oasis gained popularity and acclaim, critical consensus around The Great Escape was revised, with Q magazine even apologising for its original review. BBC Music writer James McMahon recalled how the "critical euphoria" surrounding the album lasted "about as long as it took publishers to realise Oasis would probably shift more magazines for them". The media's switch to Oasis has led to the band's critical acclaim being questioned in the years since Britpop. Additionally, the critical lauding awarded by numerous critics to Oasis out of a desire to grow sales of their own publications, rather than genuinely reviewing the album for its strengths and weaknesses alone, is recognised as a leading factor in the alleged "over-hype" of Morning Glory's follow up Be Here Now.

== Tour ==
The band embarked on what would become a 103 show world tour in support of the album over a period of several months in 1995 and 1996. The tour started on 22 June 1995 with a pre-Glastonbury festival warm-up gig at the 1,400 capacity Bath Pavilion, which featured the debut of new drummer Alan White and several new songs off the album, and ended on 4 December 1996 at the 11,800 capacity Mayo Civic Centre in Rochester, Minnesota, USA, and included concerts at Earls Court in November 1995 and Cardiff International Arena in March 1996. The tour had many disruptions and cancellations due to Noel walking out of the group twice, and Liam pulling out of a US leg.

In September 1995, bass player Paul "Guigsy" McGuigan walked out on the group after he was subjected to a flurry of verbal abuse from Liam while doing interviews in Paris. McGuigan cited nervous exhaustion as the reason for his departure. Scott McLeod of The Ya-Yas was brought in as his replacement; though, despite playing a string of gigs with the band and appearing in the video for the "Wonderwall" single, McLeod was unable to adapt to the frenetic celebrity lifestyle, duly returning to Manchester halfway through an American promotional tour for the album. The band played a few dates, including an appearance on Late Show with David Letterman, as a four-piece, before McGuigan was convinced to return for the group's Earls Court shows in early November. When the band broke up for a brief time in late 1996, several US tour dates and the entire Australia and New Zealand leg had to be cancelled.

As the band began to reach the peak of their popularity, several large open-air concerts were organised in the UK during 1996, including two gigs at Manchester City football stadium Maine Road, two nights at Loch Lomond in Scotland, and two nights at Knebworth House in front of a record 125,000 people each night; an event that would come to be acknowledged as the height of the Britpop phenomenon, with one journalist commenting; "(Knebworth) could be seen as the last great Britpop performance; nothing after would match its scale." At the time, the concerts were the biggest gigs ever held for a single band on UK soil, and to date remain the largest demand ever for a British concert; with reportedly over 2.5 million applications for tickets. The Earl's Court and Maine Road gigs were filmed and later released as the Oasis VHS/DVD ...There and Then.

== Critical reception ==
Professional ratings
Contemporary reviews
Review scores
Source	Rating
Chicago Tribune	3/4 stars
Entertainment Weekly	A−
The Guardian	4/5 stars
Los Angeles Times	3.5/4 stars
NME	7/10
Q	3/5 stars
Rolling Stone	4/5 stars
Select	4/5
Spin	6/10
The Sydney Morning Herald	2/5 stars

(What's the Story) Morning Glory? was released to lukewarm reviews from the mainstream music press. Contemporary reviewers expressed disappointment at the album's perceived inferiority to Definitely Maybe, taking aim at the "banal lyrics" and the unoriginal nature of the compositions. David Cavanagh of Q magazine said of the lyrics: "They scan; they fill a hole; end of story. They [say] nothing much about anything." Andy Gill of The Independent commented that "She's Electric" is "laddism of a tiresomely generic kind", while "Roll with It" is "drab and chummy". In Spin, Chuck Eddy wrote that the band had eschewed the "Bowie glitter" of their debut for "generic classic rock", while Sydney Morning Herald critic Shane Danielsen felt the Gallaghers lacked the ability to sing or "produce classics". While stating that "Some Might Say" was "the best single of the year", David Stubbs of Melody Maker was critical of the album as a whole; "What's the Story [sounds] laboured and lazy. On this evidence, Oasis are a limited band ... they sound knackered."

NME was more enthusiastic, with the magazine's John Robinson writing that the album shows Oasis pursuing "an altogether different direction; away from the conscience-free overloaded hedonism towards an understanding of its consequences". Rolling Stone's Jon Wiederhorn wrote that "What's the Story is more than a natural progression, it's a bold leap forward that displays significant musical and personal growth." He went on to note that the "stormy" relationship between Liam and Noel proved to be one of the album's strengths; "tension and instability have been inherent traits of great rock teams ... for Oasis, the addition of shared genes gives their songs extra impact and dimension." Los Angeles Times critic Robert Hilburn welcomed the album as a counterpoint to the prevailing "despair" of the decade's rock music. The album finished 10th in the voting for The Village Voice's annual Pazz & Jop critics' poll. The poll's curator Robert Christgau initially assessed it as "phony Beatlemania"; he later gave it a two-star honourable mention, indicating a "likable effort that consumers attuned to its overriding aesthetic or individual vision may well enjoy", and quipped "give them credit for wanting it all—and (yet another Beatles connection!) playing guitars". Select ranked the album at number two on its end-of-year list of the 50 best albums of 1995.

In his book Britpop!, John Harris concluded that the initial negative reviews of the time missed the album's universal strengths. "Those who fussed about the music's more artful aspects were missing the point. The fact that [Noel's] songs contained so many musical echoes seemed to couch the album in an air of homely reassurance." Harris believed that the "ordinary" nature of some of the album's songs "turned out to be part of its deeply populist appeal".

== Legacy ==
Professional ratings
Retrospective reviews
Review scores
Source	Rating
AllMusic	5/5 stars
Encyclopedia of Popular Music	5/5 stars
Entertainment Weekly	A
Mojo	4/5 stars
Pitchfork	8.9/10
Q	5/5 stars
Record Collector	4/5 stars
Rolling Stone	5/5 stars
The Rolling Stone Album Guide	5/5 stars
Spin	4.5/5 stars

(What's the Story) Morning Glory? is considered an important record of the Britpop era and one of the best albums of the nineties, and it appears in several lists as one of the greatest albums of all time. Rob Sheffield, writing in The Rolling Stone Album Guide (2004), called the album "a triumph, full of bluster and bravado but also moments of surprising tenderness", adding that it "capped a true golden age for Britpop". Rolling Stone ranked the album at 378 on its 2012 list of "the 500 Greatest Albums of All Time" and at 157 on its 2020 list. Spin included it at 79 in their list of "The 300 Best Albums of 1985–2014". The album's enduring popularity within the UK was reflected when it won the British Album of 30 Years award at the 2010 Brit Awards. The award was voted by the public to decide the greatest Album of the Year winner in the history of the Brit Awards. The album was also included in the book 1001 Albums You Must Hear Before You Die. It was voted number 21 in Colin Larkin's All Time Top 1000 Albums. The Encyclopedia of Popular Music stated that "it was undeniably a gigantic album".

On the other hand, some have considered What's the Story overrated. FasterLouder writer Max Easton argued that its "lasting place in '90s folklore is less about the quality of the album, and more about the celebrity status and faux imagery attached to it". Easton saw all 12 tracks as "variations on only a couple of good ideas". Musicradar felt the initial lukewarm reviews of the album were accurate, adding that "its place on countless 'best ever' lists is wholly unjustified. Even Noel Gallagher admits that Definitely Maybe is a superior record". Noel Gallagher has noted What's the Story as an overrated work, expressing a level of dissatisfaction with its production values, and stating that "some of the songs are not as great as people think they are"; he outright dismissed "Roll with It" as a "shit" song. Ultimate Guitar readers named What's the Story as one of the 20 most overrated albums in history.

What's the Story became the best-selling album of the decade in the UK, with its nineteen platinum certifications from the British Phonographic Industry for earning 5.3 million units in the United Kingdom. It was also certified four times platinum by the Recording Industry Association of America. The nineteen platinum certifications in the UK were the highest ever awarded to a single record until Adele's 21, released in 2011. It has sold over 22 million copies worldwide, making it one of the best-selling albums of all time. In July 2026, the Official Charts Company certified (What's the Story) Morning Glory? as the best-selling studio album in UK history with 6.2 million units.

What's the Story propelled Oasis from being a crossover indie act to a worldwide rock phenomenon after the momentum of the critically acclaimed Definitely Maybe. It has been pinpointed by music critics as a significant record in the timeline of British indie music, demonstrating just how far into the mainstream independent music had ventured. In 2005, John Harris noted the significance of the album and "Wonderwall" in particular to Britpop's legacy. "When (Oasis) released Wonderwall, the rules of British music were decisively changed. From hereon in, the lighter-than-air ballad became obligatory, and the leather-trousers era of rock'n'roll was over." The album's success in Britain resulted in Oasis becoming a cultural ubiquity for a brief period, featuring in tabloid newspapers on an almost daily basis and breaking sales records for live concerts.

== Track listing ==
=== Original release ===
All tracks are written by Noel Gallagher, except where noted.

No.	Title	Writer(s)	Length
1.	"Hello"	N. Gallagher, Gary Glitter, Mike Leander	3:21
2.	"Roll with It"		3:59
3.	"Wonderwall"		4:18
4.	"Don't Look Back in Anger"		4:48
5.	"Hey Now!"		5:41
6.	Untitled (also known as "The Swamp Song – Excerpt 1" (Note: "Untitled" or "The Swamp Song" was originally called "The Jam". When Paul Weller (of the band the Jam) contributed harmonica and guitar, it was decided to change the title.))		0:44
7.	"Some Might Say"		5:29
8.	"Cast No Shadow"		4:51
9.	"She's Electric"		3:40
10.	"Morning Glory"		5:03
11.	Untitled (also known as "The Swamp Song – Excerpt 2")		0:39
12.	"Champagne Supernova"		7:27
Total length:			50:00

=== Vinyl version ===
Side one
No.	Title	Length
1.	"Hello"	3:21
2.	"Roll with It"	3:59
3.	"Wonderwall"	4:18
Total length:		11:38

Side two
No.	Title	Length
1.	"Don't Look Back in Anger"	4:48
2.	"Hey Now!"	5:41
3.	Untitled (also known as "The Swamp Song — Excerpt 1")	0:44
4.	"Bonehead's Bank Holiday"	4:03
Total length:		15:16

Side three
No.	Title	Length
1.	"Some Might Say"	5:29
2.	"Cast No Shadow"	4:51
3.	"She's Electric"	3:40
Total length:		14:00

Side four
No.	Title	Length
1.	"Morning Glory"	5:03
2.	Untitled (also known as "The Swamp Song — Excerpt 2")	0:39
3.	"Champagne Supernova"	7:27
Total length:		13:09

=== Singles box set ===
(What's the Story) Morning Glory?

Box set by Oasis
- Released: 4 November 1996
- Recorded: 1995
- Genres: Rock, Britpop
- Length: 81:59
- Label: Creation
- Producers: Owen Morris, Noel Gallagher

Oasis box set chronology
Definitely Maybe (1996)	(What's the Story) Morning Glory? (1996)

The (What's the Story) Morning Glory? box set was released on 4 November 1996, featuring four discs of singles, including B-sides, and one disc of interviews. The album charted at number 24 on the UK Albums Chart.

All songs written by Noel Gallagher, except "Cum On Feel the Noize" by Noddy Holder and Jim Lea; "Step Out" co-written by Stevie Wonder, Henry Cosby and Sylvia Moy.

Disc one
No.	Title	Length
1.	"Interviews"	18:22
Total length:		18:22

Disc two
No.	Title	Length
1.	"Some Might Say"	5:29
2.	"Talk Tonight"	4:21
3.	"Acquiesce"	4:25
4.	"Headshrinker"	4:38
Total length:		18:53

Disc three
No.	Title	Length
1.	"Roll with It"	3:59
2.	"It's Better People"	3:59
3.	"Rockin' Chair"	4:36
4.	"Live Forever" (Live at Glastonbury Festival, 1995)	4:40
Total length:		17:14

Disc four
No.	Title	Length
1.	"Wonderwall"	4:18
2.	"Round Are Way"	5:42
3.	"The Swamp Song"	4:15
4.	"The Masterplan"	5:23
Total length:		19:38

Disc five
No.	Title	Length
1.	"Don't Look Back in Anger"	4:47
2.	"Step Out"	3:40
3.	"Underneath the Sky"	3:20
4.	"Cum on Feel the Noize"	5:09
Total length:		16:56

==== Charts ====
Chart (1996)	Peak position
Scottish Albums (Official Charts)	28
UK Albums (Official Charts)	24

==== Certifications ====
Region	Certification	Certified units/sales
United Kingdom (BPI)	Silver	60,000^{*}
^{^} Shipments figures based on certification alone.

=== 2014 reissue ===
As part of a promotional campaign entitled Chasing the Sun, the album was re-released on 29 September 2014. The 3-disc deluxe edition includes remastered versions of the album and its associated b-sides from the four UK singles. Bonus content includes 5 demo tracks, and live choices taken from the band's iconic gigs at Earls Court, Knebworth Park and Maine Road.

All tracks are written by Noel Gallagher, except where noted.

2014 reissue disc 1: (What's the Story) Morning Glory?
No.	Title	Writer(s)	Length
1.	"Hello"	Noel Gallagher, Gary Glitter, Mike Leander	3:23
2.	"Roll with It"		3:59
3.	"Wonderwall"		4:18
4.	"Don't Look Back in Anger"		4:49
5.	"Hey Now!"		5:41
6.	Untitled (also known as "The Swamp Song – Excerpt 1")		0:44
7.	"Some Might Say"		5:27
8.	"Cast No Shadow"		4:54
9.	"She's Electric"		3:40
10.	"Morning Glory"		5:03
11.	Untitled (also known as "The Swamp Song – Excerpt 2")		0:39
12.	"Champagne Supernova"		7:30
Total length:			50:13

Japanese bonus tracks (SICP-4152)
No.	Title	Length
13.	"Hello" (Demo)	3:15
14.	"Wonderwall" (Live at Knebworth Park)	4:07
Total length:		57:22

2014 reissue disc 2: B-Sides & Extra Tracks
No.	Title	Writer(s)	Original single	Length
1.	"Talk Tonight"		"Some Might Say" (1995)	4:24
2.	"Acquiesce"		"Some Might Say"	4:29
3.	"Headshrinker"		"Some Might Say"	4:42
4.	"It's Better People"		"Roll with It" (1995)	4:01
5.	"Rockin' Chair"	N. Gallagher, Chris Griffiths	"Roll with It"	4:40
6.	"Step Out"	N. Gallagher, Stevie Wonder, Henry Cosby, Sylvia Moy	"Don't Look Back in Anger" (1996)	3:45
7.	"Underneath the Sky"		"Don't Look Back in Anger"	3:25
8.	"Cum On Feel the Noize"	Jim Lea, Noddy Holder	"Don't Look Back in Anger"	5:13
9.	"Round Are Way"		"Wonderwall" (1995)	5:45
10.	"The Swamp Song"		"Wonderwall"	4:23
11.	"The Masterplan"		"Wonderwall"	5:26
12.	"Bonehead's Bank Holiday"		Vinyl-only bonus track	4:03
13.	"Champagne Supernova" (Brendan Lynch mix)		Previously unreleased	6:59
14.	"You've Got to Hide Your Love Away"	John Lennon, Paul McCartney	Some Might Say EP (Japan only)	2:18
Total length:				1:03:33

2014 reissue disc 3: Unreleased demos and live recordings
No.	Title	Length
1.	"Acquiesce" (live at Earls Court, London on 4 November 1995)	3:55
2.	"Some Might Say" (demo. Recorded at soundcheck Club Quattro Tokyo, Japan on 14 September 1994)	4:04
3.	"Some Might Say" (live at Roskilde Festival, Denmark on 30 June 1995)	5:07
4.	"She's Electric" (demo. Recorded at Mauldeth Road West Studio, Manchester)	3:03
5.	"Talk Tonight" (live at Bath Pavilion on 22 June 1995)	3:43
6.	"Rockin' Chair" (demo. Recorded at Mauldeth Road West Studio, Manchester)	4:05
7.	"Hello" (live at Roskilde Festival, Denmark on 30 June 1995)	3:24
8.	"Roll with It" (live at Roskilde Festival, Denmark on 30 June 1995)	4:08
9.	"Morning Glory" (live at Roskilde Festival, Denmark on 30 June 1995)	4:48
10.	"Hey Now!" (demo. Recorded at soundcheck Club Quattro Tokyo, Japan on 14 September 1994)	3:08
11.	"Bonehead's Bank Holiday" (demo. Recorded at soundcheck Club Quattro Tokyo, Japan on 14 September 1994)	2:09
12.	"Round Are Way" (MTV Unplugged. Royal Festival Hall, London on 23 August 1996)	4:52
13.	"Cast No Shadow" (live at Maine Road, Manchester on 27 April 1996)	4:06
14.	"The Masterplan" (live at Knebworth Park, Hertfordshire on 10 August 1996)	4:56
Total length:		55:28

=== 2025: 30th anniversary reissue ===
To mark the 30th anniversary of the original release, the album was reissued on 3 October 2025. The reissue includes the remastered original album packaged with one additional disc containing five unplugged recordings produced and mixed by Noel Gallagher and Callum Marinho from the original masters.

2025 reissue disc 2
No.	Title	Length
1.	"Cast No Shadow" (Unplugged)	5:01
2.	"Morning Glory" (Unplugged)	4:35
3.	"Wonderwall" (Unplugged)	4:12
4.	"Acquiesce" (Unplugged)	4:02
5.	"Champagne Supernova" (Unplugged)	6:29

== Personnel ==
Oasis

- Liam Gallagher – vocals (1–3, 5, 7–10, 12), tambourine
- Noel Gallagher – lead guitar, acoustic guitar, backing vocals, lead vocals (4), Mellotron, piano, EBow, bass (3, 6, 8, 9, 11), production
- Paul "Bonehead" Arthurs – rhythm guitar (all except 3), Mellotron, piano, Hammond organ (4)
- Paul "Guigsy" McGuigan – bass (1, 2, 4, 5, 7, 10, 12)
- Alan "Whitey" White – drums, percussion (all except 7)

Additional musicians

- Tony McCarroll – drums (7)
- Brian Cannon – keyboards (10)
- Owen Morris – Kurzweil strings (3, 4), Mellotron (12)
- Paul Weller – lead guitar (6, 11, 12), backing vocals (12), harmonica (6, 11), whistle (12)

Additional personnel

- Owen Morris – production
- Neil Dorfsman – multichannel mixing (SACD version)
- David Swope – assistant mixing (SACD version)
- Barry Grint – original audio mastering at Abbey Road Studios
- Vlado Meller – mastering (SACD version)
- Michael Spencer Jones – photography
- Brian Cannon – artwork, design
- Mathew Sankey – assistant design

== Charts ==
=== Weekly charts ===
Chart (1995–1996)	Peak position
Australian Albums (ARIA)	1
Austrian Albums (Ö3 Austria)	3
Belgian Albums (Ultratop Flanders)	7
Belgian Albums (Ultratop Wallonia)	3
Canada Top Albums/CDs (RPM)	1
Danish Albums (Hitlisten)	3
Dutch Albums (Album Top 100)	4
Estonian Albums (Eesti Top 10)	7
European Albums (Music & Media)	1
Finnish Albums (Suomen virallinen lista)	8
French Albums (SNEP)	8
German Albums (Offizielle Top 100)	3
Hungarian Albums (MAHASZ)	32
Icelandic Albums (Tónlist)	1
Irish Albums (IRMA)	1
Italian Albums (FIMI)	5
Japanese Albums (Oricon)	8
New Zealand Albums (RMNZ)	1
Norwegian Albums (VG-lista)	5
Portuguese Albums (AFP)	6
Scottish Albums (Official Charts)	1
Spanish Albums (AFYVE)	1
Swedish Albums (Sverigetopplistan)	1
Swiss Albums (Schweizer Hitparade)	1
UK Albums (Official Charts)	1
US Billboard 200	4
US Cash Box Top 100 Albums (Billboard)	3
Zimbabwean Albums (ZIMA)	5

Chart (2014)	Peak position
US Top Catalog Albums (Billboard)	11
US Indie Store Album Sales (Billboard)	18
US Vinyl Albums (Billboard)	3

Chart (2024–2026)	Peak position
German Rock & Metal Albums (Offizielle Top 100)	1
Greek Albums (IFPI)	15
Irish Independent Albums (IRMA)	15
Japanese Hot Albums (Billboard Japan)	13
US Independent Albums (Billboard)	12
US Top Rock & Alternative Albums (Billboard)	24

=== Year-end charts ===
Chart (1995)	Position
Australian Albums (ARIA)	56
Belgian Albums (Ultratop Wallonia)	63
European Albums (Music & Media)	41
French Albums (SNEP)	34
Swedish Albums & Compilations (Sverigetopplistan)	21
UK Albums (OCC)	2

Chart (1996)	Position
Australian Albums (ARIA)	4
Austrian Albums (Ö3 Austria)	19
Canadian Albums (RPM)	4
Dutch Albums (Album Top 100)	29
European Albums (Music & Media)	3
French Albums (SNEP)	18
German Albums (Ofizielle Top 100)	17
New Zealand Albums (RMNZ)	2
Spanish Albums (AFYVE)	27
Swedish Albums & Compilations (Sverigetopplistan)	43
Swiss Albums (Schweizer Hitparade)	10
UK Albums (OCC)	3
US Billboard 200	13

Chart (1997)	Position
UK Albums (OCC)	35

Chart (1998)	Position
UK Albums (OCC)	119

Chart (1999)	Position
UK Albums (OCC)	160

Chart (2005)	Position
UK Albums (OCC)	133

Chart (2010)	Position
South Korean International Albums (Circle)	33

Chart (2011)	Position
South Korean International Albums (Circle)	56

Chart (2012)	Position
South Korean International Albums (Circle)	34

Chart (2013)	Position
South Korean International Albums (Circle)	69

Chart (2014)	Position
South Korean International Albums (Circle)	53

Chart (2015)	Position
South Korean International Albums (Circle)	49

Chart (2016)	Position
South Korean International Albums (Circle)	66

Chart (2017)	Position
South Korean International Albums (Circle)	70
UK Albums (OCC)	57

Chart (2018)	Position
South Korean International Albums (Circle)	63
UK Albums (OCC)	50

Chart (2019)	Position
UK Albums (OCC)	53

Chart (2020)	Position
Irish Albums (IRMA)	45
UK Albums (OCC)	21

Chart (2021)	Position
UK Albums (OCC)	28

Chart (2022)	Position
UK Albums (OCC)	29

Chart (2023)	Position
UK Albums (OCC)	35

Chart (2024)	Position
UK Albums (OCC)	24

Chart (2025)	Position
Belgian Albums (Ultratop Flanders)	151
UK Albums (OCC)	7

=== Decade-end charts ===
Chart (1990–1999)	Position
UK Albums (OCC)	1

Chart (2010–2019)	Position
UK Vinyl Albums (OCC)	7

== Certifications and sales ==
Region	Certification	Certified units/sales
Argentina (CAPIF)	Gold	30,000^{^}
Australia (ARIA)	9× Platinum	630,000^{‡}
Austria (IFPI Austria)	Gold	25,000^{*}
Belgium (BRMA)	Gold	25,000^{*}
Brazil (Pro-Música Brasil)	Platinum	250,000^{‡}
Canada (Music Canada)	8× Platinum	800,000^{^}
Denmark (IFPI Danmark)	7× Platinum	140,000^{‡}
Finland (Musiikkituottajat)	Gold	27,540
France (SNEP)	Platinum	300,000^{*}
Germany (BVMI)	Gold	250,000^{^}
Hong Kong (IFPI Hong Kong)	Gold	10,000^{*}
Ireland (IRMA)	6× Platinum	90,000^{^}
Italy (FIMI) sales for 1995–96	Platinum	150,000
Italy (FIMI) sales since 2009	3× Platinum	150,000^{‡}
Japan (RIAJ)	Platinum	200,000^{^}
Netherlands (NVPI)	Gold	50,000^{^}
New Zealand (RMNZ)	3× Platinum	45,000^{‡}
Norway (IFPI Norway)	Platinum	50,000^{*}
Singapore (RIAS)	Gold	5,000^{*}
Spain (Promusicae)	2× Platinum	200,000^{^}
Sweden (GLF)	Platinum	100,000^{^}
Switzerland (IFPI Switzerland)	Gold	25,000^{^}
Thailand	Gold	20,000
United Kingdom (BPI)	19× Platinum	6,200,000
United States (RIAA)	4× Platinum	5,500,000
Summaries
Europe (IFPI)	6× Platinum	6,000,000^{*}
^{*} Sales figures based on certification alone.^{^} Shipments figures based on certification alone.^{‡} Sales+streaming figures based on certification alone.

== See also ==
- List of best-selling albums
- List of best-selling albums in the United Kingdom
- Loudness war
