= She's Electric =

1995 promotional single by Oasis

Promotional single by Oasis

from the album (What's the Story) Morning Glory?
- Released: 2 October 1995
- Recorded: May 1995
- Studio: Rockfield (Monmouth, Wales)
- Genre: Britpop; folk rock
- Length: 3:40
- Label: Creation
- Songwriter: Noel Gallagher
- Producers: Owen Morris; Noel Gallagher

Lyric video
- "Oasis - She's Electric (Official Lyric Video)" on YouTube

(What's the Story) Morning Glory? track listing
- 12 tracks: 1. "Hello"; 2. "Roll with It"; 3. "Wonderwall"; 4. "Don't Look Back in Anger"; 5. "Hey Now!"; 6. Untitled; 7. "Some Might Say"; 8. "Cast No Shadow"; 9. "She's Electric"; 10. "Morning Glory"; 11. Untitled; 12. "Champagne Supernova"

"She's Electric" is a song by English rock band Oasis. It is the ninth track on their 1995 album (What's the Story) Morning Glory?

== Background ==
"She's Electric" first appeared on Oasis' 1995 album (What's the Story) Morning Glory? It was intended to be released on the band's debut album Definitely Maybe, but was replaced by the song "Digsy's Dinner" which they believed was a better live song. The song is notable for its storytelling lyrics and singer Liam Gallagher's vocal performance which includes falsetto. Portions of the song's verse also carry an identical melodic and bass line as the verse of "Lady Madonna", albeit transposed.

A lyric video for the song was released on 2 October 2018, 23 years to the day of the album's release.

== Personnel ==
- Liam Gallagher – lead vocals, tambourine
- Noel Gallagher – lead guitar, backing vocals, bass
- Paul "Bonehead" Arthurs – rhythm guitar, piano
- Alan White – drums, percussion

== Reception ==
"She's Electric" reached number 11 in the United Arab Emirates. NME ranked "She's Electric" 51st among Oasis songs.

== Certifications ==
Region	Certification	Certified units/sales
United Kingdom (BPI)	2× Platinum	1,200,000^{‡}
^{‡} Sales+streaming figures based on certification alone.

"She's Electric" was certified 2× Platinum in the UK; along with "Cast No Shadow" (Silver), it is one of the two non-singles on the album which received a certification.

== Sources ==
- Moore, Allan F. (1997). The Beatles: Sgt. Pepper's Lonely Hearts Club Band. New York City: Cambridge University Press. ISBN 978-0-521-57381-8.
