= Liz Carey =

American actress (born 1978)

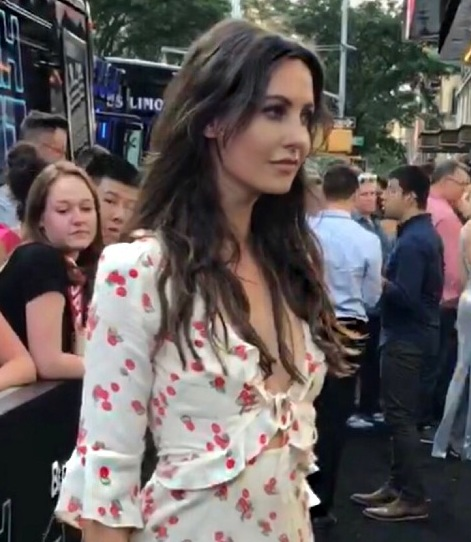
- Carey at the New York premiere of Rough Night, 2017
- Born: January 25, 1978 (age 48)
- Occupations: Actress; model; comedian; podcaster; writer
- Years active: 1995–present
- Spouse: Alan White (m. 1997; div. 2004)

Liz Carey (born January 25, 1978) is an American actress, comedian, podcaster and writer.

== Career ==
After moving to California from Ohio at age 17, Carey pursued a career in modelling and was signed to Wilhelmina Models. In December 1995, while on the set of the music video for the British band Oasis' "Don't Look Back in Anger" single, she met the Oasis drummer, Alan White, as she was also one of the models for the music video. They married in 1997 and divorced in 2004.

In 2006, Carey designed a range of handbags for her clothing line Bird. The name of the company later had to be changed to Liz Carey handbags after a legal dispute with Juicy Couture, after it launched its own line with the same name in 2009.

After she launched her career covering the red carpet for E! News, Carey broke into comedy through her role as Craig Ferguson's sidekick on The Late Late Show. Shortly after, she was on Comedy Central's The Showbiz Show with David Spade and has since written and performed many sketches for Funny or Die. From 2011 to 2014, she was a series regular on Chelsea Lately, and is a contributing writer to various publications, including The Hive and New York magazine.

As an actress, Carey has appeared on CBS' Elementary and CBS All Access' Strange Angel. She has recurred on Netflix's Love and ABC's Super Fun Night with Rebel Wilson, and has had guest spots on series including CBS' 2 Broke Girls. She has appeared in films including The 40-Year-Old Virgin, Spanglish, Walk of Shame and Alexander and the Terrible, Horrible, No Good, Very Bad Day. She performed with Miles Teller in Bleed for This and with Mark Wahlberg in Peter Berg's Deepwater Horizon.

Carey was a writer and actor for Fameless with David Spade and the co-host of the podcast Girlboss Radio with the Nasty Gal founder, Sophia Amoruso.

== Filmography ==
=== Film ===
Year	Title	Role	Notes
2004	Spanglish	Hostess at John's Restaurant	
2005	The 40-Year-Old Virgin	Bar Girl	
2006	The Dog Problem	Angry Ketchup Waitress	
2006	Hollywood	Franny	
2007	Bunny Whipped	Jewelry Model	
2013	Movie 43	Sitara	Uncredited
2014	Back in the Day	Angie Kramer	
2014	Walk of Shame	Jordan	
2014	Behaving Badly	Woman at Strip Club	
2014	Alexander and the Terrible, Horrible, No Good, Very Bad Day	Yoga Instructor	
2015	Day Out of Days	Jesse	
2015	Bleed for This	Charity	

=== Television ===
Year	Title	Role	Notes
2013	2 Broke Girls	Hippie Hat Girl	Episode: "And the Soft Opening"
2014	Super Fun Night	Dede	2 episodes
2016	Typical Rick	Tonya	Episode: "Up in the Club"
2019	Strange Angel	Connie	Episode: "The Wheel of Fortune"
2019	Elementary	Diana Long	Episode: "On the Scent"
2021	Curb Your Enthusiasm	Carly	Episode: "What Have I Done?"
