= Morning Glory (Oasis song) =

1995 single by Oasis

Single by Oasis

from the album (What's the Story) Morning Glory?
- B-side: "It's Better People"; "Rockin' Chair"; "Live Forever" (live)
- Released: 18 September 1995 (Note: Released as a commercial single only in Australia, New Zealand and Japan.)
- Genre: Britpop; rock
- Length: 5:03
- Label: Creation; Epic
- Songwriter: Noel Gallagher
- Producers: Owen Morris; Noel Gallagher

Oasis singles chronology
"Roll with It" (1995)	"Morning Glory" (1995)	"Wonderwall" (1995)

Music video
- "Morning Glory" on YouTube

(What's the Story) Morning Glory? track listing
- 12 tracks: 1. "Hello"; 2. "Roll with It"; 3. "Wonderwall"; 4. "Don't Look Back in Anger"; 5. "Hey Now!"; 6. Untitled; 7. "Some Might Say"; 8. "Cast No Shadow"; 9. "She's Electric"; 10. "Morning Glory"; 11. Untitled; 12. "Champagne Supernova"

"Morning Glory" is a song by the English rock band Oasis, written by Noel Gallagher and included on the band's second album, (What's the Story) Morning Glory?, in September 1995. It was given a commercial single release only in Australia, New Zealand, and Japan, and it was also a radio single in the United States and Canada. In North America, it was the first song of the album to receive significant play on modern rock radio stations, which "Some Might Say" and "Roll with It" had not achieved.

== Content ==
=== Lyrics and themes ===
Critics have long noted the song’s overt drug imagery (e.g., “chained to the mirror and the razor blade”) and its nod to the Beatles’ “Tomorrow Never Knows.” The full line in its parent album's name is present in the chorus' lyrics.

=== Musical style ===
Kenneth Partridge said of the riff that opens "Morning Glory" that it is "strikingly similar" to that of "The One I Love" by American rock band R.E.M.

== Critical reception ==
Retrospective assessments have typically highlighted “Morning Glory” as one of the band’s ferocious mid-90s rockers. In a 2020 ranking of Oasis songs for The Guardian, Alexis Petridis placed it at No. 4, calling it “potent, feral and aggressive.” Later retrospectives note its enduring status on the parent album as a brash counterpoint to the ballads.

== Music video ==
The song's accompanying video was directed by Jake Scott. Its opening exterior shots feature Balfron Tower in Poplar, East London, intercut with scenes of the band performing in a small flat while residents noisily protest outside. The video concludes with all the tenants gathering around the door, beating on it and yelling, just as the band finishes playing and packs up their instruments.

== Legacy and media ==
A Dave Sardy remix of “Morning Glory” appeared on the Goal! (Music From The Motion Picture) soundtrack (2005). Contemporary reviews noted the inclusion, with mixed views on the new mix. The track has also remained among the album’s most-played cuts in the streaming era, reflecting its continued visibility alongside the ballads.

Professional wrestler Nick Aldis used the song as his entrance music at Night 1 of WWE SummerSlam on 1 August 2026 in his one-off match for the wrestling promotion. According to Aldis, as a child, he had visualised that the song would be a "killer" entrance music.

== Other releases ==
- In October 2005, a remix of the song was released on the soundtrack to the movie Goal!. It was done by Don't Believe the Truth producer Dave Sardy.
- The song is included on Oasis' compilation album Stop the Clocks. On the original album, the song segues into the 40-second untitled track, which in turn segues into "Champagne Supernova". This is the same thing that happens on Stop the Clocks, except the untitled track is not included, leaving the water sounds from "Morning Glory" to directly segue into "Champagne Supernova".

== Track listings ==
Australian CD and cassette single; Japanese CD single

1. "Morning Glory"
2. "It's Better People"
3. "Rockin' Chair"
4. "Live Forever" (live at Glastonbury '95, 23 June 1995)

== Personnel ==
Oasis

- Liam Gallagher – vocals, tambourine
- Noel Gallagher – lead guitars, backing vocals
- Paul "Bonehead" Arthurs – rhythm guitar
- Paul "Guigsy" McGuigan – bass
- Alan White – drums, percussion

Additional musician

- Brian Cannon – keyboard

== Charts ==
=== Weekly charts ===
Weekly chart performance for "Morning Glory"
Chart (1995)	Peak position
Australia (ARIA)	25
Canada Rock/Alternative (RPM)	4
New Zealand (Recorded Music NZ)	29
Scottish Singles Sales (Official Charts)	84
UK Singles (OCC)	147
US Alternative Airplay (Billboard)	24

Chart (2025)	Peak position
Japan Hot Overseas (Billboard Japan)	16

=== Year-end charts ===
1995 year-end chart performance for "Morning Glory"
Chart (1995)	Position
Australia (ARIA)	76
Canada Rock/Alternative (RPM)	18

== Certifications ==
Certifications for "Morning Glory"
Region	Certification	Certified units/sales
Australia (ARIA)	Gold	35,000^{^}
United Kingdom (BPI)	Platinum	600,000^{‡}
^{^} Shipments figures based on certification alone.^{‡} Sales+streaming figures based on certification alone.

== Release history ==
Release dates and formats for "Morning Glory"
Region	Date	Format(s)	Label(s)	Catalogue	Ref.
Australia	18 September 1995	CD	Creation; Epic	662488 2	
United States	26 September 1995	Contemporary hit radio	Epic	—N/a	
