= Some Might Say =

1995 single by Oasis

Single by Oasis

from the album (What's the Story) Morning Glory?
- B-side: "Talk Tonight"; "Acquiesce"; "Headshrinker"
- Released: 24 April 1995
- Recorded: 24–26 February 1995
- Studio: Loco, Wales
- Genre: Britpop; rock
- Length: 5:28
- Label: Creation
- Songwriter: Noel Gallagher
- Producers: Owen Morris; Noel Gallagher

Oasis singles chronology
"Rock 'n' Roll Star" (1995)	"Some Might Say" (1995)	"Roll with It" (1995)

(What's the Story) Morning Glory? track listing
- 12 tracks: 1. "Hello"; 2. "Roll with It"; 3. "Wonderwall"; 4. "Don't Look Back in Anger"; 5. "Hey Now!"; 6. Untitled; 7. "Some Might Say"; 8. "Cast No Shadow"; 9. "She's Electric"; 10. "Morning Glory"; 11. Untitled; 12. "Champagne Supernova"

Music video
- "Some Might Say" on YouTube

"Some Might Say" is a song by the English rock band Oasis. It was released by Creation Records as the first single from their second studio album, (What's the Story) Morning Glory? (1995), on 24 April 1995. The song was written by the band's lead guitarist Noel Gallagher. It became the band's first UK number one single, debuting atop the Official Singles Chart on 30 April 1995, displacing Take That's "Back for Good". The single was also the last to feature all five original members, as drummer Tony McCarroll was fired one week after its release.

The single release was also named an EP in the Stop the Clocks booklet. It is thus one of the only Oasis singles to officially be also categorised an extended play.

== Background ==
"Some Might Say" was the earliest song written for (What's the Story) Morning Glory?. The band recorded a demo of the track in July 1994 at Maison Rouge Studios, during the recording of the single "Whatever" with producer Owen Morris. The original demo version of the song lasts 6:33 while the final version is 5:26 long.

In a 2016 interview, Noel Gallagher said he preferred the demo version of "Some Might Say" over the final version, describing the demo as "dirtier and sleazier" than the Oasis version which is "more Britpop". The demo version was later released as a bonus track on the Japanese CD single. The track was also inspired by the song "Fuzzy" by Grant Lee Buffalo. Its b-side "Headshrinker" was the last Oasis track to feature original drummer Tony McCarroll, whose firing was publicly announced on 30 April. The rest of the tracks on the album feature his replacement, Alan White, on drums. Oasis performed the song on two episodes of Top of the Pops, the first being McCarroll's final performance with the band and the second being White's first.

== Single artwork ==
The sleeve artwork was created by Brian Cannon of Microdot. It was shot on 23 January 1995, on the disused platform of Cromford railway station in Derbyshire, England, with much of the imagery being inspired by lyrics taken from the single. The overall concept was based on the lyrics, "... standin' at the station, in need of education in the rain"; education being required to learn the station was, at the time, disused.

It features Cannon's father with a wheelbarrow - which he created by welding a wheel and handles onto a sink - full of fish, from the lyrics, "The sink is full of fishes". Cannon's mother is also present, holding a mop, as well as Carla Knox, barmaid of Cannon's local pub. The silverware on Knox's head is a play on the lyric, "She's got dirty dishes on her brain." Liam Gallagher can be seen on the bridge whilst Noel can be viewed with a watering can on the platform. Matthew Sankey, Cannon's aide, plays a homeless man, a reference to the lyrics "... the man who cannot shine" and "... the man who lives in hell". Cannon considers the art to be his favourite of all the Oasis sleeves he designed.

== Critical reception ==
David Stubbs from Melody Maker named the song Single of the Week, writing, "'Some Might Say' is Oasis' best yet. Initially, like some, I thought Oasis were merely Mancunian chancers keeping The Stone Roses' seat warm but now I'm utterly hooked on those hooks. This just climbs and climbs and then the way that note just hangs there in the final crescendo and trails off, onward and upward, all the way to heaven...aahhh!!" Both Leesa Daniels and Jordan Paramor from Smash Hits gave it a top score of five out of five. Daniels named it "a complete knicker elastic-snapping rock tune", and said, "This is tremendous. It's one of those tunes where you'll hit the dancefloor, rip all your clothes off and get taken away for being a public nuisance." In 2024, Paste and Rolling Stone ranked "Some Might Say" number four and number ten, respectively, on their lists of the greatest Oasis songs.

In later appraisals, the track has been highlighted as a key Oasis single: Paste ranked it fourth in the band’s catalogue in 2024, while Rolling Stone placed it tenth on its 2024 list of the 40 best Oasis songs.

== Promotional video ==
A planned promo video shoot was reportedly abandoned when Liam Gallagher failed to attend; a compilation using pre-existing clips (including "Cigarettes & Alcohol" and "Supersonic") was circulated instead.

== Track information ==
In an interview promoting the compilation album Stop the Clocks, Noel stated "Some Might Say" is the "archetypical Oasis song" and "defines what Oasis is". He added "Some Might Say"'s B-side, "Acquiesce", was also the song that defined Oasis. In the 2003 documentary Live Forever: The Rise and Fall of Brit Pop, journalist Jon Savage recalls watching Oasis perform "Some Might Say" for the first time on Top of the Pops with tears in his eyes as he believed it marked a turning point in British culture, coinciding with the May local elections where the then-Conservative Government of John Major were trounced.

"Some Might Say" was the 31st-biggest-selling single of 1995 in the UK. It has sold over 1.3 million copies the UK as of April 2026. There is a banner at Etihad Stadium that reads "Some might say we will find a brighter day" in reference to a line of the song.

== Track listings ==
All songs are written by Noel Gallagher except where noted.

=== United Kingdom ===
- CD single (CRESCD 204)
1. "Some Might Say"
2. "Talk Tonight"
3. "Acquiesce"
4. "Headshrinker"
- 7-inch and cassette single (CRE 204, CRECS 204)
1. "Some Might Say"
2. "Talk Tonight"
- 12-inch single (CRE 204T)

A1. "Some Might Say"
B1. "Talk Tonight"
B2. "Acquiesce"

=== Australia ===
- CD single (HES 664059 2)
1. "Some Might Say"
2. "Listen Up"
3. "Bring It On Down" (live)

=== Japan ===
- CD single (ESCA 6251)
1. "Some Might Say" – 5:27
2. "Talk Tonight" – 4:21
3. "Acquiesce" – 4:24
4. "Headshrinker" – 4:39
5. "Some Might Say" (demo) – 6:47
6. "You've Got to Hide Your Love Away" (Lennon–McCartney) – 2:16

=== B-sides ===
All of the single's original B-sides were included on The Masterplan album. "Talk Tonight" was recorded the previous year, in the October 1994 sessions for the "Whatever" single's b-sides, but was saved for the band's next single. It is one of many acoustic B-side tracks sung by Noel and was inspired by the near-breakup of the band in Los Angeles in September 1994, when Noel walked out without telling anyone and headed for San Francisco. Noel was inspired to write the song after he met a girl while in San Francisco and talked to her for hours about his troubles with the band and life. "Acquiesce" was released as part of the Stop the Clocks EP in promotion of their compilation album, Stop the Clocks.

"Headshrinker", a fast tempo punk rockesque track, was originally written in 1992. Although rarely performed live, it became a fan favourite and, in 2022, Liam released it as part of his Down by the River Thames live album recorded in 2020 when the COVID-19 pandemic caused venue closures. "Listen Up" was originally released as a B-side to "Cigarettes & Alcohol". "Bring It On Down - (Live)", a recording from the band's first ever radio session in 1993, was originally released as a B-side to "Shakermaker". Noel's rendition of the Beatles track "You've Got to Hide Your Love Away" was later recorded during a radio session one month after the release of (What's the Story) Morning Glory?.

== Personnel ==
- Liam Gallagher – vocals, tambourine
- Noel Gallagher – lead guitar, backing vocals
- Paul Arthurs – rhythm guitar
- Paul McGuigan – bass
- Tony McCarroll – drums

== Charts ==
=== Weekly charts ===
Chart (1995)	Peak position
Belgium (Ultratop 50 Wallonia)	33
Europe (Eurochart Hot 100)	3
Finland (Suomen virallinen lista)	9
Iceland (Íslenski Listinn Topp 40)	3
Ireland (IRMA)	3
Israel (IBA)	30
Japan (Oricon)	43
Netherlands (Single Top 100 Tip)	10
Scottish Singles Sales (Official Charts)	1
Sweden (Sverigetopplistan)	7
UK Singles (Official Charts)	1
UK Indie (Music Week)	1

Chart (2014)	Peak position
US Hot Singles Sales (Billboard)	1

=== Year-end charts ===
Chart (1995)	Position
Iceland (Íslenski Listinn Topp 40)	38
Sweden (Topplistan)	84
UK Singles (OCC)	31

== Certifications ==
Region	Certification	Certified units/sales
United Kingdom (BPI)	2× Platinum	1,300,000
^{‡} Sales+streaming figures based on certification alone.

== Release history ==
Region	Date	Format(s)	Label(s)	Ref.
United Kingdom	24 April 1995	7-inch vinyl; CD; cassette	Creation	
Japan	13 July 1995	CD	Epic Japan	

== Appearances in other media ==
- "Some Might Say" is a playable track in both Guitar Hero World Tour and the European version of Guitar Hero: On Tour. The song, as it appears on Guitar Hero, is the full version without the early fade from the album edit, which is not available on any other official or promotional Oasis release.
- It is played in an episode of Jonathan Creek, "The Reconstituted Corpse".
- Oasis gave permission for Labour candidate Andy Burnham to use the song during his campaign for the 2026 Makerfield by-election.
