= Roll with It (Oasis song) =

1995 single by Oasis

Single by Oasis

from the album (What's the Story) Morning Glory?
- B-side: "It's Better People"; "Rockin' Chair"
- Released: 14 August 1995
- Studio: Rockfield (Monmouth, Wales)
- Genre: Rock; Britpop; stadium rock
- Length: 3:59
- Label: Creation
- Songwriter: Noel Gallagher
- Producers: Owen Morris; Noel Gallagher

Oasis singles chronology
"Some Might Say" (1995)	"Roll with It" (1995)	"Morning Glory" (1995)

(What's the Story) Morning Glory? track listing
- 12 tracks: 1. "Hello"; 2. "Roll with It"; 3. "Wonderwall"; 4. "Don't Look Back in Anger"; 5. "Hey Now!"; 6. Untitled; 7. "Some Might Say"; 8. "Cast No Shadow"; 9. "She's Electric"; 10. "Morning Glory"; 11. Untitled; 12. "Champagne Supernova"

Music video
- "Oasis - Roll With It (Official HD Remastered Video)" on YouTube

"Roll with It" is a song by the English rock band Oasis. Written by lead guitarist Noel Gallagher, it was released on 14 August 1995 as the second single from their second studio album, (What's the Story) Morning Glory? (1995).

The release date of "Roll With It" coincided with that of Blur's "Country House". The synchronicity—amplified by weeks of media focus on the bands' rivalry—framed the singles as a head-to-head for number one in the UK. Official Charts Company later characterised the contest as one of the most prominent in chart history, with Blur ultimately outselling Oasis by around 50,000 copies in the first week.

== 'Battle' with Blur ==
"Roll with It" received a great deal of attention when Food Records, the label of Britpop rivals Blur, moved the original release date of the single "Country House" to beat it on the charts, sparking what came to be known as "The Battle of Britpop". The British media had already reported an intense rivalry between the two bands and this clash of releases was seen as a battle for the number one spot. The media sensation was spurred on by verbal attacks from the respective camps (in particular the Gallagher brothers, Damon Albarn and Alex James), that extended beyond the music industry to the point where the two bands were regularly mentioned on the evening news. In particular, public imagination was sparked by the contrast between the "working class" Oasis and the "middle class" Blur. In the end, Blur's "Country House" single sold 274,000 copies to Oasis' 216,000 copies of "Roll with It". The singles charted at number 1 and number 2 respectively.

In 2019, Noel Gallagher reflected on the battle on Dermot O'Leary's Reel Stories, dismissing both songs as "shit". He suggested that a chart race between Oasis's "Cigarettes & Alcohol" and Blur's "Girls & Boys" would have had greater merit: "'Roll With It' has never been played by anybody since the band split up".

== Critical reception ==
The AllMusic editor Stephen Thomas Erlewine described 'Roll with It' as "an assured stadium rocker that unabashedly steals the crown from Status Quo". David Stubbs from Melody Maker wrote, "This isn't the mounting cascade of manna and adrenalin that was 'Some Might Say' or 'Acquiesce'. It's subdued by comparison, a light shower after that musical thunderstorm, something for us to kick through the puddles to until their next mighty moment of precipitous pop. Rolling along, marking time, fair enough." A reviewer from Music & Media said, "When was it that dance fans predicted the end of rock? By going two steps back to the '60s Oasis takes it six steps forward. So roll over you sceptics, "my my, hey hey, rock 'n' roll is to stay."" Mark Sutherland from NME wrote, "Have no fear, you will la-la-la-like it. It is, after all, a pretty good record." Andrew Harrison from Select named it "Oasis' weakest single, but still far from the Quo travesty of legend, even if the song might conjure visions of flying wetlook perms." Leesa Daniels from Smash Hits gave it two out of five and named it "the weakest track" of the album, "and Liam sounds like he's got a sore throat."

== Legacy and retrospective views ==
In a 2019 BBC programme, Noel Gallagher looked back on the 1995 chart race and dismissed both "Roll with It" and Blur's "Country House", suggesting that an earlier pairing ("Cigarettes & Alcohol" versus "Girls & Boys") would have been a fairer contest. The Official Charts Company has since described the Blur–Oasis showdown as one of the most famous chart battles in its history, emblematic of the mid-1990s Britpop era.

== Top of the Pops performance ==
When Oasis played "Roll with It" on chart show Top of the Pops on 17 August 1995, they were required to mime the song, and in doing so the Gallagher brothers switched roles with Liam pretending to play guitar and Noel pretending to sing (equipped with Liam's tambourine).

== Marketing ==
The single artwork features a photograph of the band on the beach at Weston-super-Mare. Many potential locations were examined along the Somerset and Avon coastline (Oasis were playing Glastonbury that weekend, so a beach within striking distance of the festival site had to be found).

== Track listing ==
- UK CD single (CRESCD 212)
1. "Roll with It"
2. "It's Better People"
3. "Rockin' Chair"
4. "Live Forever" (Live at Glastonbury '95)
- UK 7-inch single (CRE 212)

A. "Roll with It"
B. "It's Better People"

- UK 12-inch single (CRE 212T)

A1. "Roll with It"
B1. "It's Better People"
B2. "Rockin' Chair"

- UK cassette single (CRECS 212)
1. "Roll with It"
2. "It's Better People"
- Australian CD single (662325 5)
1. "Roll with It"
2. "Talk Tonight"
3. "Acquiesce"
4. "Headshrinker"

Note 1: "Headshrinker" was a B-side of the band's previous UK single "Some Might Say" and was one of the last tracks to feature original Oasis drummer Tony McCarroll.
Note 2: "Live Forever" was recorded live at the Glastonbury Festival on 23 June 1995.

== Personnel ==
- Liam Gallagher – lead vocals, tambourine
- Noel Gallagher – lead guitar, acoustic guitar, backing vocals
- Paul Arthurs – rhythm guitar
- Paul McGuigan – bass guitar
- Alan White – drums, percussion

== Charts ==
=== Weekly charts ===
Chart (1995–1996)	Peak position
Australia (ARIA)	48
Canada Rock/Alternative (RPM)	17
Europe (Eurochart Hot 100)	6
Europe (European Hit Radio)	14
Finland (Suomen virallinen lista)	5
Iceland (Íslenski Listinn Topp 40)	3
Ireland (IRMA)	2
Israel (IBA)	21
Norway (VG-lista)	18
New Zealand (Recorded Music NZ)	17
Scottish Singles Sales (Official Charts)	1
Sweden (Sverigetopplistan)	3
UK Singles (Official Charts)	2
UK Airplay (Music Week)	8

Chart (2025)	Peak position
Japan Hot Overseas (Billboard Japan)	13

=== Year-end charts ===
Chart (1995)	Position
Iceland (Íslenski Listinn Topp 40)	45
Sweden (Topplistan)	86
UK Singles (OCC)	20

== Certifications ==
Region	Certification	Certified units/sales
United Kingdom (BPI)	2× Platinum	1,200,000^{‡}
^{‡} Sales+streaming figures based on certification alone.

== Release history ==
Region	Date	Format(s)	Label(s)	Ref.
United Kingdom	14 August 1995	7-inch vinyl; CD; cassette	Creation	
Japan	7 September 1995	CD	Epic	
