= Cast No Shadow (song) =

Song by Oasis

from the album (What's the Story) Morning Glory?
- Released: 2 October 1995
- Recorded: May–June 1995
- Studio: Rockfield Studios, Gwent, Wales
- Genre: Britpop
- Length: 4:51
- Label: Creation
- Songwriter: Noel Gallagher
- Producers: Owen Morris and Noel Gallagher

(What's the Story) Morning Glory? track listing
- 12 tracks: 1. "Hello"; 2. "Roll with It"; 3. "Wonderwall"; 4. "Don't Look Back in Anger"; 5. "Hey Now!"; 6. Untitled; 7. "Some Might Say"; 8. "Cast No Shadow"; 9. "She's Electric"; 10. "Morning Glory"; 11. Untitled; 12. "Champagne Supernova"

Music video
- "Oasis - Cast No Shadow (Official Lyric Video)" on YouTube

"Cast No Shadow" is a song by English rock band Oasis from their 1995 album (What's the Story) Morning Glory?.

== Background and lyrics ==
Noel Gallagher wrote the song for his friend Richard Ashcroft, lead singer of The Verve; in the sleeve notes of the album, Gallagher dedicated the song "to the genius of Richard Ashcroft". According to Gallagher, the line "Bound with [all] the weight of all the words he tried to say" refers to Ashcroft seeming to be unhappy and trying too hard at the time. Ashcroft later said that he considered the song to be "a great honour". "Cast No Shadow" was originally intended to be a B-side, but this changed when the song turned out to be better than expected. "Cast No Shadow" was the last song written for the album; the track was composed by Gallagher while he was riding the train to return to the recording studio in Wales. Gallagher referred to the song's lyrics as "the best words I ever wrote."

== Musical style and reception ==
"Noel wrote this sparkling blues-tinged ballad for buddy Richard Ashcroft of the Verve, and the specificity might account for why the lyrics and overall presentation ring so true. Noel isn't really equipped to handle the big cosmic questions, but when he's writing about a musician who has trouble saying what's on his mind, he's spot on."

— Kenneth Partridge of Billboard magazine

Gallagher initially wanted the song to sound like Pink Floyd, particularly their album Wish You Were Here and its title track, which shared the same opening chords as "Cast No Shadow". The song has a complex and unconventional drumming rhythm compared to other Oasis tracks from the same era. Kenneth Partridge of Billboard magazine called the song a "sparkly blues-tinged ballad." Music critic Derek B. Scott remarked, "a Beatles-influenced vocal harmony that includes falsetto and echoing of words is heard in 'Cast No Shadow'". Nathan Stephens-Griffin from the band Martha stated about the song, "compared to some of the more classic Britpoppy ones, it has a really cool melancholy, dark, epic vibe." The magazine Mojo said that the song "was an uncharacteristically gentle reflection on his [Noel Gallagher's] difficulties with expressing any deep emotion, both personally and in his lyrics."

== Personnel ==
- Liam Gallagher – lead vocals, tambourine
- Noel Gallagher – lead acoustic guitar, bass, Mellotron, EBow, backing vocals
- Paul "Bonehead" Arthurs – acoustic guitar
- Alan White – drums, percussion

== Certifications ==
Region	Certification	Certified units/sales
United Kingdom (BPI)	Gold	400,000^{‡}
^{‡} Sales+streaming figures based on certification alone.

"Cast No Shadow" was certified Gold in the UK; along with "She's Electric" (2x Platinum), it is one of the two non-singles on the album which received a certification.
