= Back in the Day (2014 film) =

- Directed by: Michael Rosenbaum
- Written by: Michael Rosenbaum
- Produced by: Kim Waltrip
- Starring: Morena Baccarin; Danielle Bisutti; Liz Carey; Emma Caulfield; Sarah Colonna; Jay R. Ferguson; Mike Hagerty; Isaiah Mustafa; Kristoffer Polaha; Michael Rosenbaum; Nick Swardson; Harland Williams
- Cinematography: Bradley Stonesifer
- Edited by: Sandy S. Solowitz
- Music by: Rob Danson
- Distributed by: Screen Media Films
- Release date: January 17, 2014
- Running time: 94 minutes
- Country: United States
- Language: English

Back in the Day is a 2014 American comedy film, directed and written by Michael Rosenbaum. It is distributed by Screen Media Films. When Jim Owens makes a surprise visit to his high school reunion, all hell breaks loose. Hilarity ensues as he wrangles his now-married friends together for one last hurrah. Cruising the old strip, seeking vengeance on an old high school principal and nearly breaking up a wedding gets Jim into hot water with his friends and their wives. Back in the Day is written and directed by Michael Rosenbaum and stars Rosenbaum, Morena Baccarin, Nick Swardson, Harland Williams, Sarah Colonna, and Isaiah Mustafa. The film was produced by Kim Waltrip.

== Cast ==
- Michael Rosenbaum as Jim Owens
- Morena Baccarin as Laurie
- Kristoffer Polaha as Len Brenneman
- Isaiah Mustafa as T
- Harland Williams as Skunk
- Emma Caulfield as Molly
- Liz Carey as Angie Kramer
- Sarah Colonna as Carol
- Nick Swardson as Ron Freeman
- Danielle Bisutti as Annette Taylor
- Jay R. Ferguson as Mark
- Mike Hagerty as Principal Teagley

== Reception ==
On Rotten Tomatoes the film has a rating of 11% based on reviews from 9 critics, with an average rating of 3.4/10 based on 7 reviews. On Metacritic, the film has a score of 7 out of 100 based on reviews from 5 critics, indicating "overwhelming dislike".
