= Starclub =

English rock band (1991–1994)

- Origin: Maidstone, Kent, England
- Genre: Alternative rock
- Years active: 1991–1994
- Label: Island
- Spinoffs: Paint; Rialto; The Longshadows
- Members: Owen Vyse; Steve French; Julian Taylor; Alan White

Starclub were an early 1990s rock band from England, consisting of Owen Vyse (lead vocals, guitar, Hammond organ, keyboards), Steve French (guitar, backing vocals), Julian Taylor (bass, backing vocals) and Alan White (drums, percussion).

== History ==
Vyse, French and Taylor grew up playing music together in Maidstone in Kent, and were known then as the Shoes. They were heavily influenced by the Beatles and formed a quartet with Alan Ware on drums. The highlight of this early incarnation, while the members attended Oakwood Park Grammar School and Maidstone Grammar School, was playing to a sellout crowd at the local Hazlitt Theatre.

The Shoes continued to play gigs, mainly in London, until Island Records offered them a deal. Their new name referenced the famous Star-Club venue in Hamburg, which had been synonymous with the Beatles.

Starclub's eponymous 1993 album, produced by Chris Hughes (Tears for Fears, Adam and the Ants), was recorded with several different drummers, but Alan White was recruited as a full-time member and toured with the band that year. Georgie Fame guested on the tracks "Forever" and "The Question".

The single "Hard to Get" was a radio hit in the United States, reaching No. 10 on the Billboard Modern Rock Tracks chart.

The album received several positive reviews. In March 1993, Washington Post critic Mike Joyce said, ""Britain's Starclub has a similarly expansive view of the pop-rock world, though it is not nearly as fond of Top 40 novelties. Vibrant guitars, sweeping harmonies and an occasional funk groove are more to its liking. Because lead singer Owen Vyse sounds a lot like Paul Rodgers, comparisons with the British bands Free and Bad Company are inevitable, but Starclub's new self-titled album (on Island) is eclectic enough to make the reference moot".

The band were unexpectedly dropped by Island and split in 1994.

== Later projects ==
Soon after Starclub ended, Vyse and White formed the band Paint with Julian Taylor; White was replaced by Tam Johnstone when he left to join Oasis. Paint recorded for the Sacred label, but distributor Sony pulled the single before its release for unknown reasons. Vyse also played with Echo & the Bunnymen, and wrote and recorded with other artists for film and TV, including the movies The Crush (1993) and Still Crazy (1998) as well as the Channel 4 series The Young Person's Guide to Becoming a Rock Star (1998).

White played with Oasis from 1995 through 2004, performing on four studio albums, two compilation albums and one live album during his tenure with the band. White has since been inactive save for a 2008 live performance as guest drummer for Trio Valore, his brother Steve White's band.

French and Gin Blossoms vocalist Robin Wilson released an album in 2006 as the Longshadows.

Taylor was a member of Rialto throughout that band's 1997–2000 duration.

== Members ==
- Owen Vyse – lead vocals, guitar, Hammond organ, keyboards
- Steve French – guitar, backing vocals
- Julian Taylor – bass, backing vocals
- Alan White – drums, percussion

== Discography ==
=== Studio albums ===
- Starclub (1993, Island Records)

=== Singles ===
- "Let Your Hair Down" (1992, Island) AUS: #147
- "Hard to Get" (1993, Island)
