= The Longshadows =

American-British alternative rock superduo (2005–2006)

- Origin: New York City–Phoenix
- Genres: Alternative rock
- Years active: 2005–2006
- Label: Indie
- Past members: Steve French; Robin Wilson
- Website: Official Longshadows site

The Longshadows were a musical collaboration between Gin Blossoms vocalist Robin Wilson and composer/producer Steve French (formerly of Britpop band Starclub).

== History ==
The duo met when their respective bands toured the US in the early 1990s. After French relocated to New York, he began writing and recording a body of work that he would eventually ask Wilson to sing on. The result was the Simple Minded Way album, released in 2006 on the Uranus Laboratories label. It received critical acclaim.

In a July 2006 review, Ink19.com said, "The pop of Simple Minded Way is a slight departure from Wilson's day job band, with the album written and produced by Steve French -- formerly of Brit band Star Club. Yet the collaboration of Wilson's voice and French's songs gels incredibly well on almost every song, most notably on standout track, "Wishing We Weren't So", the melancholic "Weight On My Mind" and the Sixties-influenced "Sail On". The rousing chorus of "To Saione" reveals the perfect musical chemistry The Longshadows possess and the title track is yet another strong track with a slow-burning melody. The return of the Gin Blossoms will be much anticipated by fans, but Simple Minded Way provides ample evidence that other musical avenues could be exploited by Wilson in the future if the reunion does not go according to plan".

Michael Laskow of TAXI said, "Along with Wilson's singing, the key to the Longshadows' identity is a dynamic and atmospheric guitar sound based on open tunings. The just-completed album, which bares the working title Simple Minded Way, demonstrates that French (who plays and programs all the parts himself) is an equally adept producer, creating rich soundscapes out of his intricate electric and acoustic work and momentum-inducing grooves, which conspire to push Wilson's lush vocals in intriguing new directions. The appeal of the album is that it's at once resonantly distinctive and comfortingly familiar".

On the heels of the album's release came the reunion and touring schedule of Wilson's primary band, Gin Blossoms, thus placing the Longshadows on hold.

== Studio albums ==
- Simple Minded Way (2007, Uranus Laboratories)
