= Don't Look Back in Anger =

1996 single by Oasis

Single by Oasis

from the album (What's the Story) Morning Glory?
- B-side: "Step Out"; "Underneath the Sky"; "Cum On Feel the Noize"
- Released: 19 February 1996
- Recorded: May 1995
- Studio: Rockfield (Monmouth, Wales)
- Genre: Britpop; rock
- Length: 4:48
- Label: Creation
- Songwriter: Noel Gallagher
- Producers: Noel Gallagher; Owen Morris

Oasis singles chronology
"Wonderwall" (1995)	"Don't Look Back in Anger" (1996)	"Champagne Supernova" (1996)

Music video
- "Don't Look Back in Anger" on YouTube; "Don't Look Back in Anger" (US version) on YouTube

(What's the Story) Morning Glory? track listing
- 12 tracks: 1. "Hello"; 2. "Roll with It"; 3. "Wonderwall"; 4. "Don't Look Back in Anger"; 5. "Hey Now!"; 6. Untitled; 7. "Some Might Say"; 8. "Cast No Shadow"; 9. "She's Electric"; 10. "Morning Glory"; 11. Untitled; 12. "Champagne Supernova"

"Don't Look Back in Anger" is a song by the English rock band Oasis, released on 19 February 1996 by Creation Records as the fifth single (fourth released in the UK) from their second studio album, (What's the Story) Morning Glory? (1995). "Don't Look Back in Anger" was written by the lead guitarist and chief songwriter, Noel Gallagher, and produced by Gallagher and Owen Morris. It was the first Oasis single with lead vocals by Noel, who had previously only sung lead on B-sides, instead of his brother, Liam. Noel later sang lead vocals on six other singles.

The single was the second Oasis song to reach number one on the UK singles chart, and it was certified seven times platinum in the UK. The music video was directed by Nigel Dick, featuring Oasis performing at a mansion with a large group of women. Critically, the song received positive reviews. It is one of Oasis's signature songs and has been played at almost every live show. In later decades, it has been included in retrospective rankings of best songs, and has been described as an "anthem" by critics in various contexts.

== Background and writing ==
In a 2019 Esquire interview, Noel Gallagher said, "I remember writing it in Paris on a rainy night. We had just played a strip club: our set finished, the strippers came on. We were nothing, an insignificant little band. And I remember going back to my hotel room and writing it, and thinking, 'That'll be pretty good when we record it.' If I'd have known that night what I know now about people playing it at fucking funerals and weddings, I'd never have finished the song. Too much pressure."

In August 2007, Gallagher told Uncut, "We were in Paris playing with the Verve, and I had the chords for that song and started writing it. We were due to play two days later. Our first-ever big arena gig, it's called Sheffield Arena now. At the sound check, I was strumming away on the acoustic guitar, and [Liam] said, 'What's that you're singin'?' I wasn't singing anyway, I was just making it up. And [Liam] said, 'Are you singing, "So Sally can wait"?' And I was like—that's genius! So I started singing, 'So Sally can wait.' I remember going back to the dressing room and writing it out. It all came really quickly after that. (The title) just popped out." The title is a combination of David Bowie's 1979 song "Look Back in Anger" and the 1967 Bob Dylan documentary Dont Look Back. It is also a reference to John Osborne's 1956 play Look Back in Anger, which explores themes of empty gestures and moral surrender.

=== First performance ===
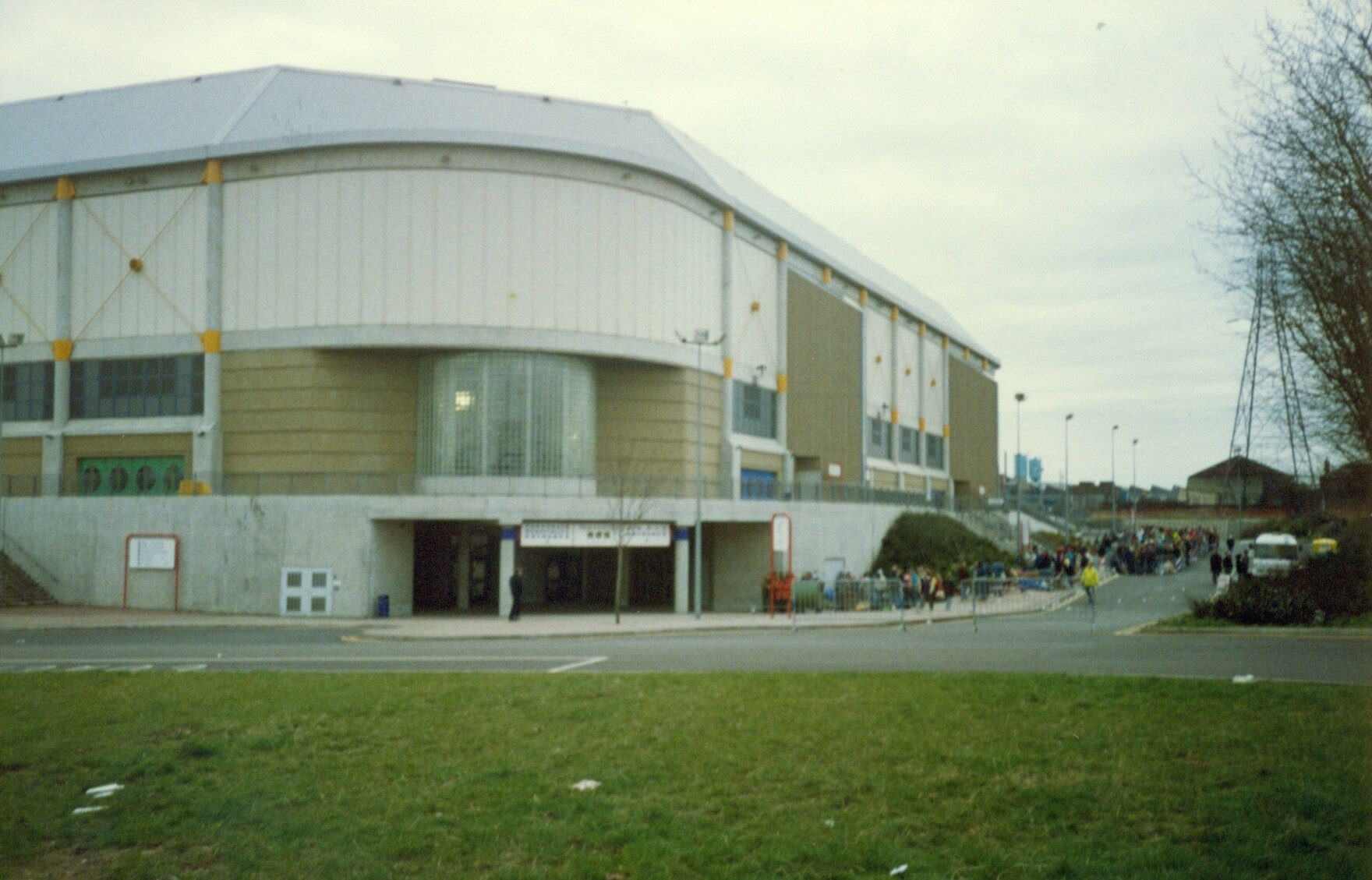
Sheffield Arena pictured in 1993

Gallagher was so excited about the potential of the song that he used an acoustic set to perform the unfinished version, with differences in the arrangement and with a few slight lyrical changes, at an Oasis concert at Sheffield Arena on Saturday, 22 April 1995. Before he performed, Noel told the 12,000-member crowd: "I'm gonna play a brand new one – I only wrote it on Tuesday! No one's heard this before." He then noted, "I haven't got a title for it yet either" as he began to play.

== Recording ==
The song was recorded at Rockfield Studios as part of (What's the Story) Morning Glory? in May–June 1995. Several days of recording had already taken place at the studio. After playing "Wonderwall" and "Don't Look Back in Anger" to Liam, Noel asked him which one he wanted to sing on. Studio engineer Nick Brine recalled: "Noel was going to sing 'Wonderwall', then Liam was going to sing 'Wonderwall', then Noel said OK I'll sing 'Don't Look in Anger' and then Liam wanted to sing 'Don't Look Back In Anger' - there was a debate as to who was going to sing what."

Eventually, Liam chose "Wonderwall", which was recorded without problems. When it came time to record "Don't Look Back in Anger", Liam felt redundant and went to the local pub at Monmouth. Later, he returned with a crowd of around 30 drunken 'friends' who disrupted the session. Alan McGee, the boss of Creation Records described it as "half of fucking Monmouth" in the room, and "complete strangers playing with £30,000 worth of guitars". He continued: "one of them asks for the number of a cab and Noel kicks them out. A punch-up ensues, and Noel chases Liam out with a cricket bat." Oasis' photographer, Michael Spencer Jones described the situation as "A Victorian fistfight on Rockfield's lawn ... It was chaos and the scene of devastation in Liam's room afterwards was like nothing I'd ever seen ... It was like a nuclear explosion had gone off." He further said: "the band quickly disappeared - and everyone was thinking 'is that it? is it over?'" Producer Owen Morris recalled: "The next morning, Noel had left. The band was over. The album dead. No one knew if he was coming back. We were all gutted."

Three weeks after the fight, Noel returned, and the band finished the song and the album on schedule. Studio owner Kingsley Ward said of the incident, "We rang the record company and they said 'we thought they'd been banned' ... We didn't care less. They're lovely boys. They came back, paid the damage about 800 quid, apologised and went in that studio and did one of the greatest records in the world afterwards. It showed this band had something going for them."

== Lyrics ==
The opening line "Slip inside the eye of your mind" is a likely reference to the English rock band Small Faces' song "My Mind's Eye". Gallagher said some lines were taken from John Lennon: "I got this tape in the United States that had apparently been burgled from the Dakota Hotel and someone had found these cassettes. Lennon was starting to record his memoirs on tape. He's going on about 'trying to start a revolution from me [sic] bed, because they said the brains I had went to my head.' I thought, 'Thank you, I'll take that!'" The line "revolution from me bed" refers to Lennon's notorious bed-ins in 1969 as Gallagher was reading Revolution in the Head: The Beatles' Records and the Sixties published in 1994.

In a September 1995 interview, before the song was released, Gallagher explained that the lines "Stand up beside the fireplace/Take that look from off your face" were from when his mother Peggy used to say something similar when she lined the three boys up for their annual Christmas photo to send to their grandmother in Ireland. In a later interview, Noel recalled that he vividly remembered her saying, "Take that stupid look off your face".

=== Meaning ===
In 1995, Gallagher said, "It's about not being upset about the things you might have said or done yesterday, which is quite appropriate at the moment. It's about looking forward rather than looking back. I hate people who look back on the past or talk about what might have been." In a 2018 interview with WXPN, Gallagher explained: "It started off as a song of defiance, about this woman: She's metaphorically seeing the diary of her life pass by, and she's thinking, 'You know what? I have no regrets.' She's raising a glass to it."

In 2005, Gallagher said that he was so high on drugs when he created the song that he had no idea what the lyrics were about: "I get the odd night when I'm halfway through "Don't Look Back in Anger" when I say to myself. 'I still don't know what these words mean!'" This sentiment has also been echoed by journalists. In 2024, Dominic Green of the Washington Examiner described the lyrics as "passionate but almost meaningless", while Simon Hattenstone of The Guardian said in 2008 "[the song is] loaded with emotional meaning, and yet virtually meaningless in [itself]...(why is Sally waiting, who exactly is looking back in anger?)"

==== Sally ====
Of the character "Sally" referred to in the song, Gallagher commented, "I don't actually know anybody called Sally. It's just a word that fit, y'know, might as well throw a girl's name in there." Gallagher said that the character "Lyla", from Oasis's 2005 single, is Sally's sister. In the interview on the DVD released with the special edition of Stop the Clocks, he also revealed that a girl approached him and asked him if Sally was the same girl mentioned on the Stone Roses song "Sally Cinnamon". Gallagher did not have the heart to tell her that it was not, but he said he wished he had thought of that first.

== Composition and structure ==
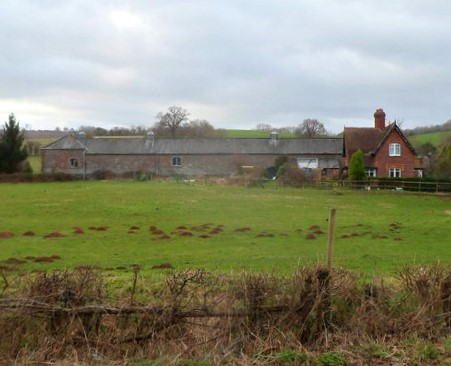
Rockfield Studios, where the song was recorded

The piano in the introduction of the song strongly resembles Lennon's "Imagine". As Oasis are often criticised for borrowing parts of other artists' songs, Gallagher commented on the intro's similarity to "Imagine":

In the case of "Don't Look Back in Anger"—I mean, the opening piano riff's "Imagine". Fifty per cent of it's put in there to wind people up, and the other 50% is saying, "Look, this is how songs like 'Don't Look Back in Anger' come about—because they're inspired by songs like 'Imagine'." And no matter what people might think, there will be some 13-year-old kid out there who'll read an interview and think, "'Imagine'? I've never heard that song." And he might go and buy the album, you know what I mean?

In an interview with Q in 1997, Gallagher said he took the main riff from David Bowie's "All the Young Dudes", saying: "Absolutely. Course. I've had two songs out of that now: 'Don't Look Back in Anger' and 'Stand by Me'. And he's still not sued me yet." Many commentators have noted that the song uses Johann Pachelbel's 17th-century "Canon in D" chord progression throughout, with a slight variation in the final bar. The chord progression of "Canon in D" is the following: I, V, vi, iii, IV, I, IV, V, while "Don't Look Back in Anger" is the following: I, V, vi, iii, IV, V – omitting the I and IV from the second bar.

As part of his What Makes This Song Great? series, Youtuber, musician, and producer Rick Beato notes in his video about "Don't Look Back in Anger" (around 4:40) how Gallagher finishes particular phrases in the song—an initial rising tone before falling off towards the end—for the words "mind", "find", and "play" in the first verse, which he describes as "caps". He explains, "if it didn't have those, it wouldn't sound like each individual phrase had come to an end, it's like a little concluding, it's the punctuation that finishes each phrase." He again notes the style for the words "been" and "seen". Beato also notes that the vocal melody of "All the Young Dudes" in Bowie's song of the same name is also appropriated using guitar in the chorus and outro of "Don't Look Back in Anger". NME noted the solo is taken from Primal Scream's "Damaged", which was itself heavily inspired by 1960s Rolling Stones recordings.

In the early 1990s, Gallagher had been invited to record with Paul Weller at The Manor Studio in Oxford, to perform on his track "I Walk on Gilded Splinters". Gallagher said of his time there: "He played me his song, 'Wings of Speed', and that was the feel I tried to get on 'Don't Look Back in Anger.'" Gallagher has also said of the song, "It reminds me of a cross between "All the Young Dudes" and something the Beatles might have done." Musician, historian, and cultural researcher Ari Katorza described the song as a "surrealist dream-like song with Beatlesque diatonic descending chords sequences".

=== "Mystery chord" ===
Over many years, a chord in the pre-chorus of the song was a source of debate as multiple sources provided different interpretations of the chord. The chord in question comes after Noel Gallagher strikes a G major during the line "Stand up beside the fireplace". The following line, where Gallagher sings "Take that look from off your face" is described as a G♯ diminished in the official Oasis songbook, but was challenged by critics as lacking the dissonance of the chord played in the recording. On 7 June 2023, Gallagher appeared on a video with That Pedal Show on YouTube, which featured him playing the song. Guitarist and YouTuber Chris Buck posted a video three days after That Pedal Show's video, in which he analyses Gallagher's fingering of the chord, confirming "It's an E dominant 7 with a G♯ in the bass", which is written as E7/G♯. Buck also commented that the official G♯ dim never sounded totally right to his ears.

== Cover art and release ==
The single's picture sleeve contains a photo by Brian Cannon. He intended the cover as a homage to an incident where Ringo Starr, having briefly left the Beatles in 1968 during the recording of the White Album, was persuaded to return, and George Harrison decorated Starr's drum kit in red, white, and blue flowers to show their appreciation. Michael Spencer Jones, an Oasis photographer, said: "Noel thought this would make an interesting idea for a cover, and so we had the band's equipment covered in thousands of red, white and blue flowers, the colours of the Union Jack. It was going to be an overhead shot and I had a scaffolding tower erected but I decided to shoot it at eye-level so that the bass drum with its Union Jack swirl could feature more prominently. The white piano was a reference to John Lennon." Cannon notes they had 10,000 carnations imported from Holland and dyed 3,000 of them blue for the shoot.

The B-side "Step Out" was originally intended for the (What's the Story) Morning Glory? album but was taken off after Stevie Wonder requested 10 per cent of the royalties as the chorus bore a similarity to his song "Uptight (Everything's Alright)". Because of this, Wonder, Henry Cosby, and Sylvia Moy received credit for writing the song, along with Noel, who decided to release it as a B-side. The song's chart success coincided with its usage at the end of the final episode of the BBC television drama Our Friends in the North. The show's producers had included the track without knowing it was going to be released as a single.

== Critical reception and legacy ==
"Don't Look Back in Anger" was generally met with critical praise, and it became a commercial hit. However, critic David Stubbs from Melody Maker attacked the song in 1995, "It's Oasis at their least incandescent, another outing for the chamber orchestra, supposedly elegiac but actually coming across as jaded and shagged. The chorus sounds like a Mott the Hoople reunion gig." while Andrew Harrison from Select praised it as "superior" and "sung beautiful by Noel." He felt the song "captures a wistful mood of confusion and loss, but you're never sure what it's all about." Leesa Daniels from Smash Hits gave the single five out of five, writing "Noel's turn to have a go at the singing lark, and by God it's fantastic! A rip-roaring, fist-punching-the-air type of anthem."

In 1996, editor Helen Lamont, also from Smash Hits, gave the single five out of five. She named it "a new rock 'n' roll classic, imagine that." Larry Flick from Billboard said: "Noel Gallagher reveals a deft sense of timing and craft that turn his improprieties into masterful pop gems." While The Stud Brothers of Melody Maker stated, "From its 'Imagine' intro to its storming conclusion this is, as we all already know, a very good song indeed." Music Week rated it five out of five and named it Single of the Week, writing, "Cheekily opening with John Lennon's 'Imagine' riff, another Beatles-inspired single which will turn on the fans on Brits day." In December of that year, Melody Maker ranked "Don't Look Back in Anger" number 31 in their list of "Singles of the Year".

=== Legacy ===
In a 2006 readers' poll conducted by Q magazine, it was voted the 20th-best song of all time. In May 2007, NME placed "Don't Look Back in Anger" at No. 14 in its list of the "50 Greatest Indie Anthems Ever". In 2012, it was ranked number one on a list of the "50 Most Explosive Choruses" by NME, and the same year it was voted the fourth-most-popular No. 1 single of the last 60 years in the UK by the public in conjunction with the Official Charts Company's 60th anniversary. In 2015, Rolling Stone readers voted it the second-greatest Britpop song after "Common People" by Pulp. In 2016, AU Review rated it at number 88 on their list of 101 best songs of all time. On 29 May 2017, Absolute Radio 90s broadcast a programme counting down the top 50 songs written by Noel Gallagher to mark his 50th birthday, with "Don't Look Back in Anger" voted No. 1. In August 2020, the song was voted as the greatest song of the 1990s by listeners of Absolute Radio 90s as part of celebrations for the station's tenth anniversary.

In a 2023 interview with Radio X, Noel compared the song to "Hey Jude" by the Beatles in terms of its impact: "You're kind of obliged to at least give it a go. 'Don't Look Back in Anger' – I don't think I'd be allowed out of the venue if I didn't play that. It's kind of like my 'Hey Jude.'" Australian National University's School of Music professor Samantha Bennett commented in 2024: "I think 'Don't Look Back in Anger' is one of their most accomplished songs from a writing perspective". She continued: "It is an anthem and features what University of Chester professor Ruth Dockwray calls 'unifying' attributes. Its huge, ascending chorus top-line follows the last descending line of the bridge, 'burn my heart out'. So there's a sense of both music and lyrics fading out before a massive rise, which has a hugely uplifting effect." In 2025, "Don't Look Back in Anger" became Oasis's second song to hit a billion streams on Spotify, after "Wonderwall".

== Chart performance ==
The song reached No. 1 in the singles charts of Ireland and the United Kingdom, and it was a moderate success by reaching the top 60 in various countries. The song was the 10th-biggest-selling single of 1996 in the UK. It is Oasis's second-biggest-selling single in the UK (after "Wonderwall"), going seven times platinum in the process. The song returned to the UK charts in 2017 following Chris Martin and Jonny Buckland's cover version at the One Love Manchester concert, reaching No. 25. "Don't Look Back in Anger" is Oasis's sixth-biggest Billboard hit in the US, reaching the No. 10 spot on the Modern Rock Tracks for the week of 22 June 1996.

== Music video ==
A frame from the song's music video showing the mansion, Noel's outfit, and a 1983 Wine Red Epiphone Riviera guitar

The accompanying music video for "Don't Look Back in Anger" was directed by British music video and film director Nigel Dick and features Patrick Macnee, the actor who played John Steed in the 1960s television series The Avengers, apparently a favourite of Oasis. It was filmed at Arden Villa, 1145 Arden Road in Pasadena, California, on 4 December 1995. It features the band being driven by Macnee in a black cab to a mansion similar to the Playboy Mansion and performing the song there; a group of women dressed in white also occasionally lip sync to the lyrics. Noel Gallagher plays a 1983 Wine Red Epiphone Riviera guitar in the video. In addition to the Beatles references in the music itself, he also wears John Lennon-style round glasses with red lenses.

In a 2022 promotional film, Noel recalled director Nigel Dick's vision of Alan White "[looking] like he was playing drums floating in the swimming pool". After seeing the scene for himself, Noel noted, "Right, because to me it fucking looks like he's just sat on a white table." Dick responded, "Yeah, but it won't look like that when we finish". Noel continued: "Of course, when it was finished, he looks like he's playing drums on a fucking white table."

There are two uploads of the music video on YouTube. One was posted by the band themselves in 2008 with over 310 million views, and another was posted in collaboration with Vevo in 2014 with over 160 million views. A slightly different and lesser-known variant of the video intended for American audiences was produced, depicting scenes from the first video concurrently in original form alongside shots from other camera angles.

== Live performances ==
The song became a favourite at Oasis's live performances and has been played at nearly every Oasis show since its release. Noel Gallagher encouraged the crowd to sing along and often kept quiet during the first chorus, allowing the fans it sing instead while he played the song's guitar part. During the Dig Out Your Soul Tour, Noel abandoned the song's previous, full-band live arrangement in favour of a much slower, primarily acoustic arrangement. From 2008 through to Oasis's break-up, the song was performed by Gallagher on his Gibson J-200 acoustic guitar, backed up by Gem Archer on electric guitar, Jay Darlington playing keyboards and Chris Sharrock playing tambourine. On 11 and 12 July 2009, during performances of the song at London's Wembley Stadium, Gallagher did not sing a word; instead, he stood back, played guitar, and allowed the crowd to sing the entire song. Since 2011, he has alternated between the acoustic version and the original arrangement when playing the song with his solo project, Noel Gallagher's High Flying Birds. In June 2017, Liam Gallagher performed an a cappella version of the song at Glastonbury, making it the first time he had performed the song rather than Noel. During the band's Live 25 tour, it was the second song played in the encore and the final song sung by Noel.

=== Manchester Arena bombing ===
So, it starts off as a song about no regrets, and then it's ended up as this anthem of defiance about not being dragged down to the level of terrorists.

— Noel Gallagher, 2018, Interview with wxpn

Following the Manchester Arena bombing on 22 May 2017 in the band's hometown of Manchester, the song was used by the people of Manchester in remembrance of the bombing's 22 victims and to show the city's spirit. The song became an unofficial "anthem" for the city. The song was sung by students of Manchester's Chetham's music school on 23 May, and on 25 May it was spontaneously sung by the crowd gathered for a minute of silence in the city centre. The woman who started the singing told The Guardian, "I love Manchester, and Oasis is part of my childhood. 'Don't Look Back in Anger'—that's what this is about: we can't be looking backwards to what happened, we have to look forwards to the future." The song re-entered the charts, along with Ariana Grande's "One Last Time", which was No. 1 on the iTunes single charts as of 26 May. On 27 May, the song was performed as a tribute by 50,000 audience members at a performance by the Courteeners in Manchester.

It was performed by Coldplay's Chris Martin and Jonny Buckland on either side of Ariana Grande at the One Love Manchester concert on 4 June 2017. Martin introduced the song by saying, "Ariana, you've been singing a lot for us, so I think we in Britain want to sing for you. This is called 'Don't Look Back in Anger', and this is from us to you". It was also performed by the military band of the French Republican Guard on 13 June 2017, at the France versus England football match at the Stade de France, as a tribute to the victims of the attacks in Manchester and, more recently, London.

== Track listing ==
All songs were written by Noel Gallagher except where noted.

- UK CD and cassette single
1. "Don't Look Back in Anger"
2. "Step Out" (Gallagher, Wonder, Cosby, Moy)
3. "Underneath the Sky"
4. "Cum On Feel the Noize" (Holder, Lea)
- UK 7-inch single

A. "Don't Look Back in Anger"
B. "Step Out" (Gallagher, Wonder, Cosby, Moy)

- UK 12-inch single

A1. "Don't Look Back in Anger"
B1. "Step Out" (Gallagher, Wonder, Cosby, Moy)
B2. "Underneath the Sky"

- US CD and cassette single
1. "Don't Look Back in Anger"
2. "Cum On Feel the Noize" (Holder, Lea)

== Personnel ==
Personnel are adapted from Pearson/Edexcel teaching material, a Paul "Bonehead" Arthurs interview, and MusicRadar.

- Noel Gallagher – lead vocals; lead and acoustic guitars; EBow
- Liam Gallagher – tambourine, backing vocals
- Paul "Bonehead" Arthurs – piano; rhythm guitar, Mellotron, Hammond organ
- Paul "Guigsy" McGuigan – bass guitar
- Alan White – drums; percussion

== Charts ==
=== Weekly charts ===
1996 weekly chart performance for "Don't Look Back in Anger"
Chart (1996)	Peak position
Australia (ARIA)	19
Belgium (Ultratop 50 Wallonia)	35
Canada Hit Parade (The Record)	19
Canada Contemporary Hit Radio (The Record)	19
Canada Top Singles (RPM)	24
Canada Rock/Alternative (RPM)	2
Czech Republic (IFPI CR)	8
Denmark (IFPI)	8
Europe (Eurochart Hot 100)	8
Europe (European AC Radio)	11
Europe (European Alternative Rock Radio)	1
Europe (European Hit Radio)	4
Finland (Suomen virallinen lista)	3
France (SNEP)	24
Germany (GfK)	57
Iceland (Íslenski Listinn Topp 40)	4
Ireland (IRMA)	1
Israel (IBA)	1
Italy (Musica e dischi)	17
Netherlands (Dutch Top 40)	33
Netherlands (Single Top 100)	30
New Zealand (Recorded Music NZ)	20
Norway (VG-lista)	19
Scottish Singles Sales (Official Charts)	1
Sweden (Sverigetopplistan)	2
Switzerland (Schweizer Hitparade)	27
UK Singles (Official Charts)	1
UK Airplay (Music Week)	1
UK Indie (Music Week)	1
US Billboard Hot 100	55
US Alternative Airplay (Billboard)	10
US Pop Airplay (Billboard)	33
US Cash Box Top 100	33
Zimbabwe (ZIMA)	8

2013 weekly chart performance for "Don't Look Back in Anger"
Chart (2013)	Peak position
Japan Hot 100 (Billboard)	29

2024–2025 weekly chart performance for "Don't Look Back in Anger"
Chart (2024–2026)	Peak position
Global 200 (Billboard)	92
Ireland (IRMA)	6
Italy (FIMI)	88
Japan Hot Overseas (Billboard Japan)	5
Portugal (AFP)	197
Sweden Heatseeker (Sverigetopplistan)	10
UK Singles (Official Charts)	9

=== Year-end charts ===
1996 year-end chart performance for "Don't Look Back in Anger"
Chart (1996)	Position
Brazil (Crowley)	86
Canada Rock/Alternative (RPM)	39
Europe (Eurochart Hot 100)	54
Europe (European Hit Radio)	16
Iceland (Íslenski Listinn Topp 40)	44
Israel (IBA)	17
Sweden (Topplistan)	83
UK Singles (OCC)	11
UK Airplay (Music Week)	4
US Modern Rock Tracks (Billboard)	58

2025 year-end chart performance for "Don't Look Back in Anger"
Chart (2025)	Position
UK Singles (OCC)	88

== Certifications ==
Certifications for "Don't Look Back in Anger"
Region	Certification	Certified units/sales
Australia (ARIA)	5× Platinum	350,000^{‡}
Brazil (Pro-Música Brasil)	Platinum	60,000^{‡}
Denmark (IFPI Danmark)	Platinum	90,000^{‡}
Italy (FIMI)	2× Platinum	200,000^{‡}
Japan (RIAJ) Digital single	Platinum	250,000^{*}
New Zealand (RMNZ)	3× Platinum	90,000^{‡}
Spain (Promusicae)	Platinum	60,000^{‡}
United Kingdom (BPI)	7× Platinum	4,200,000^{‡}
^{*} Sales figures based on certification alone.^{‡} Sales+streaming figures based on certification alone.

== Release history ==
Release dates and formats for "Don't Look Back in Anger"
Region	Date	Format(s)	Label(s)	Ref(s).
United Kingdom	19 February 1996	7-inch vinyl; CD; cassette	Creation	
Japan	22 February 1996	CD	Epic	
United Kingdom	26 February 1996	12-inch vinyl	Creation	
United States	23 July 1996	Contemporary hit radio	Epic	
