= Bath Pavilion =

Multi-purpose venue in Bath, England

Coordinates: 51.3812°N 2.3537°W

Pavilion
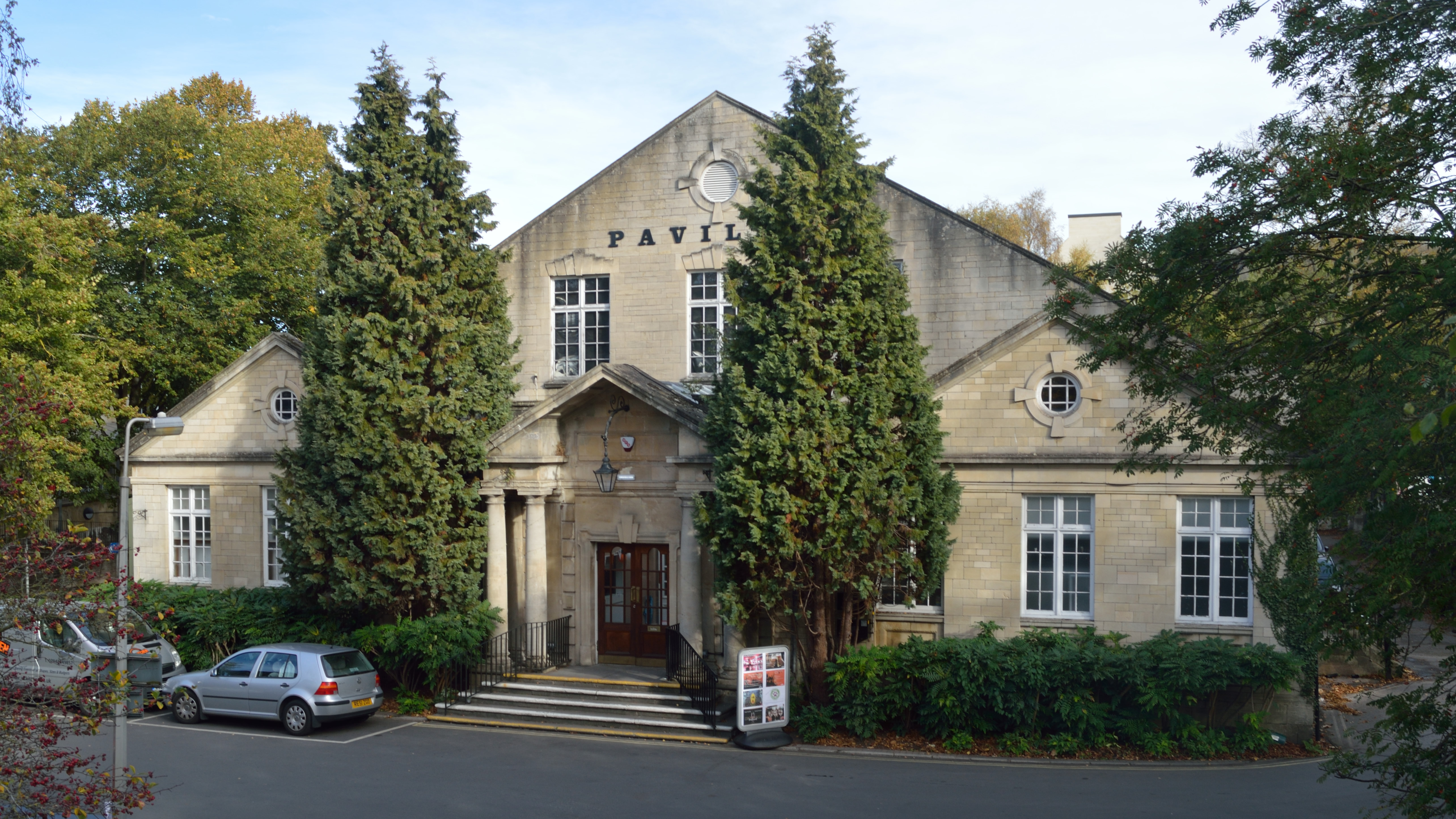
- Former names: Somerset County Skating Rink
- Address: North Parade Road; Bath, Somerset; England
- Capacity: 1400
- Opened: 1910

Website
- www.better.org.uk/venue-hire/venues/bath-pavilion

The Pavilion (also known as Bath Pavilion) is a multi-purpose venue in Bath, England. Originally opened as a skating rink, it later became a music hall and wedding venue.

== History ==
In September 1910, the building opened as the Somerset County Skating Rink on North Parade Road. It was built on land that was part of the Bathwick Estate. During World War I, the building was used for the assembly of airplane parts. After an unsuccessful attempt to sell the Bathwick Estate in 1921, the Recreation Ground was purchased by leaseholders, and the skating rink remained occupied by "Aircraft Limited" until 1930.

The building was purchased by the local City Council. It was renamed the Pavilion and reopened as a music concert hall in November 1930.

In the 1960s, the Pavilion hosted some of the biggest names in rock and roll such as the Beatles, the Rolling Stones, Jimi Hendrix, Pink Floyd, and Led Zeppelin.

During the COVID-19 pandemic, the building was used as a NHS vaccination site in 2022.

== Notable performers ==
Notable musical acts that performed at the Pavilion include:

- The Beatles
- The Rolling Stones
- The Troggs
- Ike & Tina Turner
- The Jimi Hendrix Experience
- The Kinks
- Pink Floyd
- Small Faces
- Led Zeppelin
- The Who
- Art Garfunkel
- Oasis
- Stereophonics
- Coldplay
- Franz Ferdinand
- The Doves
- The Coral
- Lily Allen
