= David Stubbs =

British music journalist (born 1962)

- Born: 13 September 1962 (age 64); London, England
- Education: University of Oxford
- Occupation: Music journalist

David Stubbs (born 13 September 1962) is a British music journalist. He grew up in Leeds and in the early 1980s was a student at the University of Oxford, where he was a close friend of fellow journalist Simon Reynolds. The two were part of the Oxford-based collective that in 1984 launched the pop journal Monitor and then in 1986 both joined Melody Maker as staff writers.

Stubbs remained at Melody Maker for a dozen years. He combined his serious writing career with writing the humorous "Talk Talk Talk" section, which featured the character of "Mr Agreeable".

== Career ==
Stubbs has written for Vox magazine, the NME (late 1990s and early 2000s), and as editor of The Wire, Uncut, The Guardian, The Times and the football magazines Goal and When Saturday Comes, where in the guise of the "Wing Commander", Stubbs covered England's ill-fated World Cup campaign, followed by their failure to qualify for Euro 2008; the reports were sufficiently popular for Stubbs to augment them with further characters. He has also contributed to many of the themed special editions of Uncut. He has written about musicians such as Jimi Hendrix and Eminem in the Stories Behind Every Song series.

In 2009, his book on 20th century avant-garde music was published, entitled Fear of Music: Why people get Rothko but don't get Stockhausen (Zero Books, Winchester: UK, 2009), which was the subject of an evening of lectures at the Tate Britain. The title may have been taken from the third studio album by Talking Heads, Fear of Music. He was among 42 who contributed essays to the bestselling The Atheist's Guide To Christmas, which also featured Richard Dawkins, Derren Brown, David Baddiel and Charlie Brooker.

In 2014, Stubbs published a comprehensive critical history of German krautrock of the 1970s, Future Days: Krautrock and the Building of Modern Germany. This was followed in 2018 by a similarly large-scale study of electronic music, Mars by 1980.

== Publications ==
- Cleaning Out My Closet: Eminem : the Stories Behind Every Song, Thunder's Mouth Press, 2003
- Fear of Music: Why People Get Rothko But Don't Get Stockhausen, Zero Books, 2009, ISBN 1-8469-4179-2
- Send Them Victorious: England's Path to Glory 2006-2010, Zero Books, 2010
- Future Days: Krautrock and the Building of Modern Germany, Faber and Faber, 2014
- 1996 and the End of History, Repeater Books, 2016
- Mars by 1980, Faber & Faber, 2018
- Future Sounds: The Story of Electronic Music from Stockhausen to Skrillex, Faber & Faber, 2018
- Different Times: A History of British Comedy, Faber & Faber, 2023, ISBN 9780571353460
