= Brian Cannon =

British graphic designer, music manager and director

Brian Cannon (born 1966) is a British graphic designer, art director, photographer, band manager and music video director. His Microdot graphic design company created the album cover for Oasis' debut album, Definitely Maybe in 1994.

Two of Cannon's record sleeve designs—Definitely Maybe (#14) and "This Is Music" (#79)—featured in Q magazine's "The Hundred Best Record Covers Of All Time" list published in 2001. He is noted for "his grandiose, ridiculously time-consuming (photo) shoots", and has produced a number of record sleeves for UK number one albums, including Urban Hymns (The Verve) and 1977 (Ash), along with two further Oasis albums—(What's The Story) Morning Glory? and Be Here Now.

He has also designed record sleeves for Ruthless Rap Assassins, Suede and Super Furry Animals, and is the former manager of the now-defunct Scottish experimental rock group, The Beta Band.

Cannon was given The Lifetime Achievement Award by the global Annual Design Awards in November 2011.
