= Alan White (Oasis drummer) =

English retired drummer (born 1972)

- Born: Alan Victor White; 26 May 1972 (age 54); Lewisham, London, England
- Genres: Britpop, rock
- Occupation: Drummer
- Years active: 1987–2004, 2008
- Formerly of: Starclub; Paint; Oasis
- Spouse: Liz Carey (m. 1997; div. 2004)

Alan Victor "Whitey" White (born 26 May 1972) is a retired English drummer, best known as the drummer of the rock band Oasis from 1995 to 2004. Before Oasis, he was the drummer of Starclub from 1991 to 1994.

He joined Oasis in April 1995 after the band's original drummer Tony McCarroll was removed, and is the longest-serving drummer in Oasis's history, performing on four studio albums, a B-side compilation, and two live albums during his tenure. He was recommended to Noel Gallagher by Gallagher's friend Paul Weller. Notably, Alan's brother, Steve, had been a longtime drummer for Weller. White left Oasis in early 2004 and was replaced by Zak Starkey, drummer of the Who and son of the Beatles' drummer Ringo Starr.

== Career ==
=== Idha, Starclub and Dr Robert (1987–1995) ===
In 1988, White auditioned to join future Oasis member Gem Archer's band Whirlpool. "He came down and just blew us all away," remembers Archer. "I thought he was mega but the others were worried what a 15-years-old kid on the road and on the lager would be like. I rang his dad and told him: 'Sorry. But don't worry he's fantastic. He'll go all the way.' And he did. It was the weirdest day when he welcomed me to Oasis. And he hasn't let me forget it." White also played drums on Andy Bell's then-wife Idha's debut solo studio album Melody Inn, forming a connection with another future Oasis member. It was at this session that Noel Gallagher first heard him playing, though he was recommended to Noel by Paul Weller. Prior to joining Oasis, White drummed with London-based band Starclub and also for Dr Robert, lead vocalist of The Blow Monkeys.

=== Oasis (1995–2004) ===
White replaced original Oasis drummer Tony McCarroll in April 1995 and was immediately "thrown in the deep end", joining the band the very next day to perform a playback of "Some Might Say" in front of a national TV audience on BBC One's long running music programme Top of the Pops. One of White's first live shows with Oasis was in front of a massive crowd at the Glastonbury Festival in June 1995.

Until the arrival of Andy Bell in the autumn of 1999, White was the only Southerner in Oasis, which was otherwise from Manchester. Initially known as 'Whitey', he was later re-christened 'Dave' by the band because he once served himself a drink from an unattended bar, therefore resembling the character Dave from "The Winchester" in the '70s TV series Minder. White commented on the "North/South divide" saying it was not that bad, but "for ages I was the 'Cockney cunt' and they were the 'Manc fuckers'". In his book, What's the Story? Ian Robertson (who served as Oasis' tour manager from 1994 to 1995) stated that White was also known by the phrase "Alan White – He's alright". White was also entrusted with the job of being Liam Gallagher's 'official' drinking partner and was also said to be his best friend in the band. Together, the pair were known as 'Bert and Ernie', named after the Sesame Street characters. In December 2002, Liam and White were involved in a high-profile brawl in a German bar. Consequently, Liam allegedly lost some of his front teeth, and White needed a brain scan after suffering minor head injuries. Both were arrested by the authorities and were released only after the band's management paid for their bail.

Noel Gallagher has stated that White had a far greater significance to the band than a mere session and touring drummer, claiming that he helped immensely in the recording process. Noel also said that when he wrote a song, he would play it to White who would often adapt the rhythm of the song or advise Gallagher on possible changes in the tempo. On the other hand, Oasis producer Owen Morris described White as "essentially a jazz drummer" who "was always shuffling away on his snare [...] and never hitting the basic back beats in a big dumb rock and roll way", feeling that he did not understand Oasis' sound as well as McCarroll.

At the time of his departure White was the longest-serving member in Oasis beside the Gallaghers (he was later passed by Gem Archer and Andy Bell) and passed through thick and thin with the brothers despite being struck down several times with bouts of alleged tendinitis during his later years with the band. White performed on four of Oasis' studio albums: (What's the Story) Morning Glory? (1995), Be Here Now (1997), Standing on the Shoulder of Giants (2000), and Heathen Chemistry (2002). He also played on the majority of band's B-sides, some of which were released on the record The Masterplan (1998).

== Legacy ==
In 2026, he and original Oasis drummer Tony McCarroll were both named as members of the band due to be inducted into the Rock and Roll Hall of Fame in November 2026

== Personal life ==
White married American actress and model Liz Carey on 13 August 1997 at Studley Priory Hotel, Oxfordshire. They had met on the set of the "Don't Look Back in Anger" music video in December 1995, as Carey was one of the models for the music video. They divorced in 2004.

White later had a son with a woman named Charlie, sold their London home in 2013, and moved with them to the country.

Steve White, Alan's older brother, played with Weller in The Style Council and various other famous musicians, including The Who. Because of this connection, Alan said, his brother greatly impacted his development as a drummer. Other influences include Keith Moon, Ringo Starr, Chad Smith, Mick Avory, and John Bonham.

== Discography ==
=== Dr Robert ===
- Bethesda (1995)

=== Oasis ===
Studio albums

- (What's the Story) Morning Glory? (1995)
- Be Here Now (1997)
- Standing on the Shoulder of Giants (2000)
- Heathen Chemistry (2002)

Live albums

- Familiar to Millions (2000)
- Knebworth 1996 (2021)

Compilation albums

- The Masterplan (1998)
- Stop The Clocks (2006)
- Time Flies... 1994-2009 (2010)
