= Don't Believe the Truth Tour =

2005–2006 concert tour by Oasis

- Tour by Oasis
- Oasis during the 2005–06 touring period
- Location: Asia; Australia; Europe; North America; South America
- Associated album: Don't Believe the Truth
- Start date: 10 May 2005
- End date: 31 March 2006
- Legs: 10
- No. of shows: 123

Oasis concert chronology
- Heathen Chemistry Tour (2002–03); Don't Believe the Truth Tour (2005–06); Dig Out Your Soul Tour (2008–09)

The Don't Believe the Truth Tour was a concert tour by the English rock band Oasis in support of their sixth album Don't Believe the Truth (2005). The world tour began with a run of warm-up shows in May 2005, including a widely covered date at London's Astoria, and continued through arena, festival and stadium appearances across Europe, North America, Asia, Oceania and South America before concluding in March 2006.

The tour marked the group's first major outing following the departure of drummer Alan White who was replaced by touring drummer Zak Starkey.

== Background ==
In early coverage of Oasis's May 2005 warm-up performances, reviewers framed the dates as a high-profile re-introduction ahead of the release of Don't Believe the Truth and the band's summer stadium commitments. The Astoria set, for example, combined older material ("Bring It On Down", "Morning Glory", "Live Forever") with new songs from the forthcoming album, reflecting the band's emphasis on premiering new material while retaining a hits-heavy core.

The tour itinerary mixed headline concerts with major festival appearances (including Hurricane Festival, Southside Festival, and Summer Sonic) and a set of large UK outdoor shows in late June and July 2005.

In North America, Oasis played a mixture of amphitheatres and arenas in 2005, quickly selling out Madison Square Garden in New York City.

== Critical reception ==
Contemporary coverage often framed the 2005 warm-up dates as a high-profile re-introduction for Oasis ahead of the wider world tour, with reviewers noting that sets typically paired established singles with unreleased new songs.

== Touring personnel ==
- Liam Gallagher – lead vocals
- Noel Gallagher – lead guitar, vocals
- Gem Archer – guitar
- Andy Bell – bass guitar
- Zak Starkey – drums

== Set list ==
This set list is representative of the performance on 2 July 2005 in Manchester, England. It does not represent all concerts for the duration of the tour.

"Fuckin' in the Bushes" (tape)

1. "Turn Up the Sun"
2. "Lyla"
3. "Bring It On Down"
4. "Morning Glory"
5. "Cigarettes & Alcohol"
6. "The Importance of Being Idle"
7. "Little by Little"
8. "A Bell Will Ring"
9. "Acquiesce"
10. "Songbird"
11. "Live Forever"
12. "Mucky Fingers"
13. "Wonderwall"
14. "Champagne Supernova"
15. "Rock 'n' Roll Star"

Encore

16. Guess God Thinks I'm Abel"
17. "The Meaning of Soul"
18. "Don't Look Back in Anger"
19. "My Generation"

Other songs performed:

1. "Headshrinker"
2. "Stop Crying Your Heart Out"
3. "Love Like a Bomb"
4. "The Masterplan"
5. "Talk Tonight"
6. "Supersonic"

== Tour dates ==
List of 2005 concerts
Date	City	Country	Venue
10 May 2005	London	England	London Astoria
12 May 2005	Milan	Italy	Alcatraz
15 May 2005	Edinburgh	Scotland	Usher Hall
22 May 2005	London	England	Clapham Grand
23 May 2005	Paris	France	Olympia
25 May 2005	London	England	The Coronet
26 May 2005	London	England	Carling Apollo Hammersmith
1 June 2005	Madrid	Spain	Aqualung
4 June 2005	Brussels	Belgium	Ancienne Belgique
6 June 2005	Berlin	Germany	Columbiahalle
10 June 2005 (Note: The 10 June 2005 concert in Scheeßel was a part of Hurricane Festival.)	Scheeßel	Germany	Eichenring
11 June 2005 (Note: The 11 June 2005 concert in Tuttlingen was a part of Southside Festival.)	Tuttlingen	Germany	Take-Off GewerbePark
12 June 2005 (Note: The 12 June 2005 concert in Imola was a part of Heineken Jammin' Festival.)	Imola	Italy	Autodromo Enzo e Dino Ferrari
15 June 2005 (Note: The 15 June 2005 concert in Toronto was part of a private show for Molson.)	Toronto	Canada	Kool Haus
17 June 2005	Toronto	Canada	Molson Amphitheatre
18 June 2005 (Note: The 18 June 2005 concert in Rochester Hills was a part of Meadow Brook Music Festival.)	Rochester Hills	United States	Meadow Brook Amphitheatre
20 June 2005	Chicago	United States	UIC Pavilion
22 June 2005	New York City	United States	Madison Square Garden
24 June 2005	Mansfield	United States	Tweeter Center
25 June 2005	Philadelphia	United States	Festival Pier at Penn's Landing
29 June 2005	Glasgow	Scotland	Hampden Park
30 June 2005	Manchester	England	Etihad Stadium
2 July 2005	Manchester	England	Etihad Stadium
3 July 2005	Manchester	England	Etihad Stadium
6 July 2005	Southampton	England	Rose Bowl
9 July 2005	Milton Keynes	England	National Bowl
10 July 2005	Milton Keynes	England	National Bowl
12 July 2005	Newcastle	England	Metro Radio Arena
13 July 2005	Newcastle	England	Metro Radio Arena
16 July 2005	Dublin	Ireland	Marlay Park
5 August 2005 (Note: The 5 August 2005 concert in Odemira was a part of MEO Sudoeste.)	Odemira	Portugal	Zambujeira do Mar
7 August 2005 (Note: The 7 August 2005 concert in Benicàssim was a part of Festival Internacional de Benicàssim.)	Benicàssim	Spain	Benicàssim Castellón
11 August 2005 (Note: The 11 August 2005 concert in Nagoya was a part of Summer Sonic Eve.)	Nagoya	Japan	Nagoya Open Air Park, Summer Sonic Eve
13 August 2005 (Note: The 13 and 14 August 2005 concerts in Osaka and Chiba were part of Summer Sonic Festival.)	Osaka	Japan	WTC Open Air Stadium
14 August 2005	Chiba	Japan	Chiba Marine Stadium
18 August 2005 (Note: The 18 August 2005 concert in Salzburg was a part of FM4 Frequency Festival.)	Salzburg	Austria	Salzburgring
20 August 2005 (Note: The 20 and 21 August 2005 concerts in Chelmsford and Staffordshire were part of V Festival.)	Chelmsford	England	Hylands Park
21 August 2005	Staffordshire	England	Weston Park
8 September 2005	Vancouver	Canada	GM Place
9 September 2005	Everett	United States	Everett Events Center
11 September 2005	Mountain View	United States	Shoreline Amphitheatre
12 September 2005	Los Angeles	United States	Hollywood Bowl
14 September 2005	Chula Vista	United States	Coors Amphitheatre
15 September 2005	Las Vegas	United States	House of Blues
17 September 2005 (Note: The 17 September 2005 concert in San Bernardino was a part of KROQ Inland Invasion.)	San Bernardino	United States	Hyundai Pavilion
18 September 2005	Phoenix	United States	Dodge Theatre
20 September 2005	Denver	United States	Red Rocks Amphitheatre
22 September 2005	Dallas	United States	Smirnoff Music Centre
24 September 2005 (Note: The 24 September 2005 concert in Austin was a part of Austin City Limits.)	Austin	United States	Zilker Park
27 September 2005	Atlanta	United States	HiFi Buys Amphitheatre
29 September 2005	Columbia	United States	Merriweather Post Pavilion
30 September 2005	Cuyahoga Falls	United States	Blossom Music Center
2 October 2005 (Note: The 2 October 2005 concert in New York City was a part of Across the Narrows.)	New York City	United States	Richmond County Bank Ballpark
3 October 2005	Atlantic City	United States	House of Blues
20 October 2005	Hamburg	Germany	Alsterdorfer Sporthalle
21 October 2005	Copenhagen	Denmark	Valby-Hallen
23 October 2005	Rouen	France	Zénith de Rouen
24 October 2005	Brussels	Belgium	Forest National
26 October 2005	Paris	France	Zénith de Paris
27 October 2005	Frankfurt	Germany	Jahrhunderthalle
29 October 2005	Treviso	Italy	Palaverde
30 October 2005	Milan	Italy	Forum di Assago
1 November 2005	Düsseldorf	Germany	Philipshalle
2 November 2005	Amsterdam	Netherlands	Heineken Music Hall
4 November 2005	Barcelona	Spain	Pavelló de la Vall d'Hebron
5 November 2005	Madrid	Spain	Palacio de Deportes de la Comunidad
17 November 2005	Osaka	Japan	Osaka-jō Hall
18 November 2005	Tokyo	Japan	Yoyogi National Gymnasium
20 November 2005	Tokyo	Japan	Yoyogi National Gymnasium
21 November 2005	Tokyo	Japan	Yoyogi National Gymnasium
26 November 2005	Brisbane	Australia	Brisbane Entertainment Centre
28 November 2005	Sydney	Australia	Hordern Pavilion
29 November 2005	Sydney	Australia	Hordern Pavilion
1 December 2005	Melbourne	Australia	Festival Hall
2 December 2005	Melbourne	Australia	Festival Hall
4 December 2005 (Note: The 4 December 2005 concert in Joondalup was a part of Rock It.)	Joondalup	Australia	Arena Joondalup
10 December 2005 (Note: The 10 December 2005 concert in Cardiff was a part of Noise And Confusion 05.)	Cardiff	Wales	Principality Stadium
12 December 2005	Aberdeen	Scotland	Aberdeen Exhibition and Conference Centre
14 December 2005	Glasgow	Scotland	Scottish Exhibition and Conference Centre
15 December 2005	Glasgow	Scotland	Scottish Exhibition and Conference Centre
18 December 2005	Belfast	Northern Ireland	Odyssey Arena
19 December 2005	Belfast	Northern Ireland	Odyssey Arena
21 December 2005	Dublin	Ireland	Point Theatre
22 December 2005	Dublin	Ireland	Point Theatre

List of 2006 concerts
Date	City	Country	Venue
25 January 2006	Oslo	Norway	Oslo Spektrum
26 January 2006	Stockholm	Sweden	Hovet
29 January 2006	Lille	France	Zénith de Lille
30 January 2006	Grenoble	France	Summum
1 February 2006	Vienna	Austria	Gasometer
2 February 2006	Winterthur	Switzerland	Eulachhalle
4 February 2006	Toulouse	France	Zénith de Toulouse
6 February 2006	Florence	Italy	Nelson Mandela Forum
7 February 2006	Rome	Italy	PalaLottomatica
9 February 2006	Sheffield	England	Hallam FM Arena
10 February 2006	Sheffield	England	Hallam FM Arena
13 February 2006	Nottingham	England	National Ice Centre
14 February 2006	Nottingham	England	National Ice Centre
18 February 2006 (Note: The 18 February 2006 concert in Bangkok was a part of 100 Rock Festival.)	Bangkok	Thailand	IMPACT Lakeside
21 February 2006	Seoul	South Korea	Olympic Gymnastics Arena
23 February 2006	Kallang	Singapore	Singapore Indoor Stadium
25 February 2006	Chek Lap Kok	Hong Kong	AsiaWorld-Arena
10 March 2006	Buenos Aires	Argentina	Campo Argentino de Polo
12 March 2006	Santiago	Chile	Velódromo Estadio Nacional
15 March 2006	São Paulo	Brazil	Credicard Hall
20 March 2006	Toronto	Canada	Air Canada Centre
22 March 2006	Milwaukee	United States	Riverside Theater
23 March 2006	Indianapolis	United States	Murat Shrine
25 March 2006	Cincinnati	United States	Taft Theatre
26 March 2006	Nashville	United States	Ryman Auditorium
28 March 2006	Houston	United States	Verizon Wireless Theater
31 March 2006	Mexico City	Mexico	Palacio de los Deportes

=== Rescheduled dates ===
Date	City	Country	Venue	Reason
25 September 2005	Houston	United States	Cynthia Woods Mitchell Pavilion	Hurricane Rita, rescheduled to March 28, 2006
