= Definitely Maybe Tour =

1994–95 concert tour by Oasis

- Tour by Oasis
- Poster with the March and April tour dates
- Location: Asia; Europe; North America
- Associated album: Definitely Maybe
- Start date: 6 February 1994
- End date: 22 April 1995
- Legs: 10
- No. of shows: 143

Oasis concert chronology
- Definitely Maybe Tour (1994–95); (What's the Story) Morning Glory? Tour (1995–96)

The Definitely Maybe Tour was a concert tour by English band Oasis in support of their hugely successful debut album Definitely Maybe. The tour, which spanned the UK, Europe, Japan, the US and Canada, included 143 shows over a period of several months in 1994 and 1995 amidst 10 different tour legs. The tour started on 6 February 1994 with a short concert at Gleneagles, Scotland, during which a live version of "Supersonic" was recorded and then released as a B-side on the "Live Forever" single. and ended on 22 April 1995 at the Sheffield Arena. The latter show featured an incomplete acoustic version of the band's future hit "Don't Look Back in Anger", and was also the last concert to feature original drummer Tony McCarroll.

Definitely Maybe was released midway through the tour in August and was widely acclaimed, propelling Oasis to become one of the foremost British acts and put them squarely at the forefront of the emerging Britpop scene. The Gallagher brothers regularly made tabloid headlines for their frequent fallouts and rockstar lifestyles, and the tour had several disruptions and cancellations. This included an infamous incident in which all of the band except Noel were deported from Amsterdam after starting a skirmish with other passengers on board. Another such occasion occurred when the band used meth with The Brian Jonestown Massacre prior to the 29 September 1994 gig at the legendary Whisky a Go Go in California. The gig was a failure with numerous mistakes and afterwards, Noel left the band for at least a week. He was ultimately tracked down by the band's management and persuaded to continue the tour. Noel wrote the song "Talk Tonight" and "(It's Good) To Be Free" during this time while away from the band. They then headed to The Congress House Studio, Austin, Texas, to record those 2 songs along with "Half the World Away" which was written in during the portion of the tour in Japan.

The Cliffs Pavilion gig on 17 April 1995 was filmed and later released as the Oasis VHS/DVD Live by the Sea.

== Set list ==
This set list is representative of the performance on 19 October 1994 at Lee's Palace in Toronto, Canada. It does not represent the set list at all concerts for the duration of the tour.

1. "Rock 'n' Roll Star"
2. "Columbia"
3. "Fade Away"
4. "Digsy's Dinner"
5. "Shakermaker"
6. "Live Forever"
7. "Bring It On Down"
8. "Up In The Sky"
9. "Slide Away"
10. "Cigarettes & Alcohol"
11. "Married With Children"
12. "Supersonic"
13. "I Am the Walrus"

Other songs performed:

1. "Cloudburst"
2. "I Will Believe"
3. "Listen Up"
4. "Whatever"
5. "Sad Song"
6. "D'Yer Wanna Be A Spaceman?"
7. "Take Me Away"
8. "(It's Good) To Be Free"
9. "Talk Tonight"
10. "Headshrinker"
11. "Don't Look Back in Anger"
12. "Acquiesce"
13. "Some Might Say"

== Tour dates ==
List of 1994 concerts
| Date | City | Country | Venue |
|---|---|---|---|
| 9 March 1994 | Gleneagles | Scotland | Gleneagles Golf Club |
| 23 March 1994 | Bedford | England | The Angel |
| 24 March 1994 | London | England | 100 Club |
| 26 March 1994 | Tunbridge Wells | England | The Forum |
| 27 March 1994 | Oxford | England | Oxford Brookes University Student Union |
| 28 March 1994 | Birmingham | England | Jug of Ale |
| 29 March 1994 | Southampton | England | The Joiners |
| 30 March 1994 | Bristol | England | Fleece |
| 31 March 1994 | Bath | England | The Moles Club |
| 5 April 1994 | Dundee | Scotland | Lucifer's Mill |
| 6 April 1994 | Edinburgh | Scotland | La Belle Angele |
| 7 April 1994 | Glasgow | Scotland | The Tramway |
| 8 April 1994 | Middlesbrough | England | Arena |
| 11 April 1994 | Stoke-on-Trent | England | The Wheatsheaf |
| 12 April 1994 | Leeds | England | Duchess of York |
| 13 April 1994 | Liverpool | England | Lomax |
| 29 April 1994 | Kingston upon Hull | England | The New Adelphi Club |
| 30 April 1994 | Coventry | England | Coventry University |
| 2 May 1994 | Portsmouth | England | The Wedgewood Rooms |
| 3 May 1994 | Newport | Wales | TJ's |
| 4 May 1994 | Derby | England | The Wherehouse |
| 6 May 1994 | Leicester | England | Princess Charlotte |
| 7 May 1994 | Windsor | England | The Old Trout |
| 8 May 1994 | Northampton | England | Roadmender |
| 10 May 1994 | Chelmsford | England | The Army and Navy |
| 11 May 1994 | Cambridge | England | The Boat Race |
| 13 May 1994 | New Cross | England | The Venue |
| 14 May 1994 | Sheffield | England | The Leadmill |
| 1 June 1994 | Birmingham | England | Edward's No. 8 |
| 2 June 1994 | Cardiff | Wales | Cardiff University |
| 3 June 1994 | Ilford | England | The Island |
| 4 June 1994 | London | England | Royal Albert Hall |
| 6 June 1994 | Norwich | England | Norwich Arts Centre |
| 8 June 1994 | London | England | Marquee Club |
| 9 June 1994 | Manchester | England | Hop & Grape |
| 11 June 1994 | Preston | England | Avenham Park |
| 12 June 1994 | Glasgow | Scotland | Cathouse |
| 13 June 1994 | Glasgow | Scotland | Cathouse |
| 18 June 1994 | Brighton | England | East Wing Centre |
| 26 June 1994 | Pilton | England | Glastonbury Festival |
| 1 July 1994 | Leeds | England | The Warehouse |
| 21 July 1994 | New York | United States | Wetlands Preserve |
| 31 July 1994 | Strathclyde Country Park | Scotland | T in the Park |
| 9 August 1994 | Newcastle | England | Riverside |
| 10 August 1994 | Leeds | England | Leeds Irish Centre |
| 11 August 1994 | Wolverhampton | England | Wulfrun Hall |
| 13 August 1994 | Hultsfred | Sweden | Hultsfredsfestivalen |
| 15 August 1994 | Nottingham | England | Rock City |
| 16 August 1994 | London | England | The Forum |
| 18 August 1994 | London | England | Astoria |
| 21 August 1994 | London | England | The Borderline |
| 26 August 1994 | Biddinghuizen | Netherlands | Lowlands |
| 28 August 1994 | Biddinghuizen | Netherlands | Lowlands |
| 31 August 1994 | Buckley | Wales | Tivoli |
| 2 September 1994 | Stockholm | Sweden | Gino |
| 3 September 1994 | Dublin | Ireland | Tivoli Theatre |
| 4 September 1994 | Belfast | Northern Ireland | Limelight |
| 5 September 1994 | Manchester | England | The Haçienda |
| 8 September 1994 | Hamburg | Germany | LOGO |
| 9 September 1994 | Amsterdam | Netherlands | Hotel Arena |
| 13 September 1994 | Tokyo | Japan | Shibuya Club Quattro |
| 14 September 1994 | Tokyo | Japan | Shibuya Club Quattro |
| 15 September 1994 | Tokyo | Japan | Shibuya Club Quattro |
| 16 September 1994 | Tokyo | Japan | Shibuya Club Quattro |
| 18 September 1994 | Osaka | Japan | Shinsaibashi Club Quattro |
| 19 September 1994 | Nagoya | Japan | Nagoya Club Quattro |
| 23 September 1994 | Seattle | United States | Moe's Mo' Rockin' Cafe |
| 24 September 1994 | Portland | United States | Satyricon |
| 26 September 1994 | San Francisco | United States | Bottom of the Hill |
| 27 September 1994 | Sacramento | United States | Melarky's |
| 29 September 1994 | West Hollywood | United States | Whisky A Go Go |
| 14 October 1994 | Minneapolis | United States | Uptown Bar |
| 15 October 1994 | Chicago | United States | Metro |
| 16 October 1994 | Detroit | United States | Saint Andrew's Hall |
| 18 October 1994 | Cleveland Heights | United States | Grog Shop |
| 19 October 1994 | Toronto | Canada | Lee's Palace |
| 21 October 1994 | Boston | United States | Local 186 |
| 22 October 1994 | Pawtucket | United States | The Met |
| 23 October 1994 | Philadelphia | United States | JC Dobbs |
| 26 October 1994 | Washington | United States | 9:30 Club |
| 28 October 1994 | Hoboken | United States | Maxwell's |
| 29 October 1994 | New York | United States | Wetlands Preserve |
| 3 November 1994 | Lille | France | Les Inrockuptibles |
| 4 November 1994 | Paris | France | La Cigale |
| 5 November 1994 | Lyon | France | Transbordeur |
| 6 November 1994 | Marseille | France | Théâtre du Moulin |
| 16 November 1994 | Stockholm | Sweden | Stockholm Palladium |
| 17 November 1994 | Gothenburg | Sweden | Que Club |
| 18 November 1994 | Lund | Sweden | Dairy |
| 20 November 1994 | Berlin | Germany | Loft |
| 21 November 1994 | Hamburg | Germany | Markthalle |
| 23 November 1994 | Frankfurt | Germany | Batschkapp |
| 24 November 1994 | Cologne | Germany | Luxor |
| 25 November 1994 | Amsterdam | Netherlands | Paradiso |
| 27 November 1994 | Essen | Germany | Zeche Carl |
| 28 November 1994 | Brussels | Belgium | L’Orangerie du Botanique |
| 30 November 1994 | Southampton | England | Southampton Guildhall |
| 1 December 1994 | Sheffield | England | Octagon Centre |
| 4 December 1994 | Cambridge | England | Cambridge Corn Exchange |
| 7 December 1994 | Glasgow | Scotland | Barrowlands |
| 11 December 1994 | Wolverhampton | England | Civic Hall |
| 12 December 1994 | Cardiff | Wales | Cardiff Astoria |
| 13 December 1994 | London | England | Hammersmith Palais |
| 17 December 1994 | Liverpool | England | Royal Court Theatre |
| 18 December 1994 | Manchester | England | Manchester Academy |
| 27 December 1994 | Glasgow | Scotland | Barrowlands |
| 29 December 1994 | Brighton | England | Brighton Centre |
| 30 December 1994 | Middlesbrough | England | Town Hall |

List of 1995 concerts
| Date | City | Country | Venue |
|---|---|---|---|
| 28 January 1995 | Seattle | United States | DV8 |
| 29 January 1995 | Vancouver | Canada | Commodore Ballroom |
| 30 January 1995 | Portland | United States | Roseland Theater |
| 1 February 1995 | San Francisco | United States | The Fillmore |
| 3 February 1995 | Hollywood | United States | The Palace |
| 4 February 1995 | San Diego | United States | SOMA |
| 5 February 1995 | Mesa | United States | Nile Theater |
| 7 February 1995 | Salt Lake City | United States | The Bar & Grill |
| 9 February 1995 | Denver | United States | Bluebird Theatre |
| 11 February 1995 | Dallas | United States | Deep Ellum Live |
| 12 February 1995 | Austin | United States | Liberty Lunch |
| 13 February 1995 | Houston | United States | Urban Art Bar |
| 15 February 1995 | Memphis | United States | New Daisy Theatre |
| 17 February 1995 | Carrboro | United States | Cat's Cradle |
| 25 February 1995 | Vancouver | Canada | Commodore Ballroom |
| 3 March 1995 | Asbury Park | United States | The Stone Pony |
| 4 March 1995 | Washington | United States | WUST Music Hall |
| 5 March 1995 | Virginia Beach | United States | The Abyss |
| 7 March 1995 | Philadelphia | United States | Theatre of Living Arts |
| 8 March 1995 | New York | United States | The Academy |
| 10 March 1995 | Providence | United States | Lupo's Heartbreak Hotel |
| 11 March 1995 | Boston | United States | Avalon |
| 12 March 1995 | Montreal | Canada | Club Soda |
| 14 March 1995 | Toronto | Canada | The Phoenix Concert Theatre |
| 15 March 1995 | Cleveland | United States | The Odeon |
| 16 March 1995 | Detroit | United States | Saint Andrew's Hall |
| 18 March 1995 | Indianapolis | United States | Tyndall Armory |
| 19 March 1995 | Chicago | United States | The Vic Theatre |
| 20 March 1995 | Grand Rapids | United States | Orbit Room |
| 24 March 1995 | Minneapolis | United States | First Avenue |
| 25 March 1995 | Milwaukee | United States | The Rave |
| 17 April 1995 | Southend-on-Sea | England | Cliffs Pavilion |
| 20 April 1995 | Paris | France | Bataclan |
| 22 April 1995 | Sheffield | England | Sheffield Arena |

=== Cancellations and rescheduled shows ===
| Date | City | Country | Venue | Reason |
|---|---|---|---|---|
| 18 February 1994 (Note: Supporting The Verve) | Amsterdam | Netherlands | Arena | Ferry incident |
| 30 September 1994 | San Diego | United States | Casbah | Cancelled after infamous Whiskey gig and Noel disappeared to San Francisco |
| 1 October 1994 | Tempe | United States | Boston's Bar and Grille | Cancelled after infamous Whiskey gig and Noel disappeared to San Francisco |
| 3 October 1994 | Salt Lake City | United States | The Bar and Grill | Cancelled after infamous Whiskey gig and Noel disappeared to San Francisco |
| 4 October 1994 | Denver | United States | Mercury Cafe | Cancelled after infamous Whiskey gig and Noel disappeared to San Francisco |
| 6 October 1994 | Dallas | United States | Trees | Cancelled after infamous Whiskey gig and Noel disappeared to San Francisco |
| 8 October 1994 | Austin | United States | Liberty Lunch | Cancelled after infamous Whiskey gig and Noel disappeared to San Francisco |
| 10 October 1994 | St. Louis | United States | Cicero's | Cancelled after infamous Whiskey gig and Noel disappeared to San Francisco |
| 11 October 1994 | Lawrence | United States | The Bottleneck | Cancelled after infamous Whiskey gig and Noel disappeared to San Francisco |
| 12 October 1994 | Springfield | United States | The Bottom Line | Cancelled after infamous Whiskey gig and Noel disappeared to San Francisco |
| 8 December 1994 | Middlesbrough | England | Town Hall | Liam contracted laryngitis, rescheduled to 30 December 1994 |
| 9 December 1994 | Liverpool | England | Royal Court | Liam contracted laryngitis, rescheduled to 17 December 1994 |
| 20 January 1995 (Note: Concert was part of Big Day Out) | Auckland | New Zealand | Mount Smart Stadium | Liam contracted laryngitis |
| 22 January 1995 | Melbourne | Australia | Melbourne Showgrounds | Liam contracted laryngitis |
| 26 January 1995 | Sydney | Australia | Sydney Showground | Liam contracted laryngitis |
| 29 January 1995 | Gold Coast | Australia | Gold Coast Parklands | Liam contracted laryngitis |
| 3 February 1995 | Adelaide | Australia | Adelaide Showground | Liam contracted laryngitis |
| 5 February 1995 | Perth | Australia | Fremantle Oval | Liam contracted laryngitis |
| 9 February 1995 | Kawasaki | Japan | Club Citta | Liam contracted laryngitis |
| 10 February 1995 | Fukuoka | Japan | Scala Espacio | Liam contracted laryngitis |
| 20 February 1995 | Kawasaki | Japan | Club Citta | Liam contracted laryngitis |
