= Heathen Chemistry Tour =

2002–03 concert tour by Oasis

- Tour by Oasis
- Poster for the concert in Düsseldorf, Germany
- Location: Asia; Australia; Europe; North America
- Associated album: Heathen Chemistry
- Start date: 17 June 2002
- End date: 12 March 2003
- Legs: 7
- No. of shows: 94

Oasis concert chronology
- 10 Years of Noise and Confusion Tour (2001); Heathen Chemistry Tour (2002–03); Don't Believe the Truth Tour (2005–06)

The Heathen Chemistry World Tour was a concert tour by the English band Oasis, which took place between 2002 and 2003. The tour was in promotion of their record Heathen Chemistry. While the tour was successful, it was plagued by major incidents including lead singer Liam Gallagher's voice giving out during three of the band's gigs and resulted in him walking off stage and guitarist Noel Gallagher had to take over on vocals, a car crash that left Noel, bassist Andy Bell, and touring keyboardist Jay Darlington in hospital and resulted in the North America leg getting cut short and a bar brawl in Munich, Germany involving Liam, drummer Alan White and several members of their crew that left Liam getting his teeth knocked out and getting fined £35,000, White getting brain scans, and the Germany leg being delayed to March 2003. This is the band's last world tour with White, before his dismissal in January 2004.

== Set list ==
This set list is representative of the performance on 5 July 2002 in London, England. It does not represent all concerts for the duration of the tour.

"Fuckin' in the Bushes" (tape)

1. "Hello"
2. "The Hindu Times"
3. "Hung in a Bad Place"
4. "Go Let It Out"
5. "Columbia"
6. "Morning Glory"
7. "Stop Crying Your Heart Out"
8. "Little by Little"
9. "D'You Know What I Mean?"
10. "Cigarettes & Alcohol"
11. "Live Forever"
12. "Better Man"
13. "She's Electric"
14. "Born on a Different Cloud"
15. "Acquiesce"

Encore

16. "Force of Nature"
17. "Don't Look Back in Anger"
18. "Some Might Say"
19. "My Generation"

Other songs performed:

1. "Supersonic"
2. "Fade Away"
3. "Gas Panic!"
4. "Slide Away"
5. "Champagne Supernova"
6. "Rock 'n' Roll Star"
7. "I Am the Walrus"
8. "Whatever"
9. "The Masterplan"
10. "One Way Road"
11. "Talk Tonight"
12. "Cast No Shadow"
13. "Half the World Away"
14. "Wonderwall"
15. "Hey Hey, My My (Into the Black)"
16. "Bitter Sweet Symphony"
17. "(You've Got) the Heart of a Star"
18. "Married With Children"
19. "Bring It On Down"
20. "Songbird"

== Tour dates ==
List of 2002 concerts
Date	City	Country	Venue	Tickets Sold/Available	Box Office
5 February 2002	Watford	England	Watford Coliseum	—N/a	—N/a
6 February 2002	London	England	Royal Albert Hall	5,267 / 5,267 (100%)	— (Note: The 6 February 2002 concert in London was a part of the Teenage Cancer Trust.)
10 February 2002	Berlin	Germany	Columbiahalle	—N/a	—N/a
26 April 2002	Las Vegas	United States	The Joint	—N/a	—N/a
28 April 2002	Indio	United States	Empire Polo Club	— (Note: The 28 April 2002 concert in Indio was a part of the Coachella Valley Music and Arts Festival.)	
1 May 2002	Florence	Italy	Piazza San Giovanni	—N/a	—N/a
23 May 2002 (Note: The 23 May 2002 concert in Tokyo was a part of MTV Superdry.)	Tokyo	Japan	Zepp Tokyo	—N/a	—N/a
17 June 2002	Lyon	France	Le Transbordeur	—N/a	—N/a
19 June 2002	Barcelona	Spain	Razzmatazz	—N/a	—N/a
21 June 2002	Modena	Italy	Vox Club	—N/a	—N/a
24 June 2002	Berlin	Germany	Columbiahalle	—N/a	—N/a
26 June 2002	Stockholm	Sweden	Cirkus Djurgarden	—N/a	—N/a
29 June 2002	Belfast	Northern Ireland	Odyssey Arena	—N/a	—N/a
30 June 2002	Belfast	Northern Ireland	Odyssey Arena	—N/a	—N/a
2 July 2002	Hull	England	Hull Arena	—N/a	—N/a
3 July 2002	Hull	England	Hull Arena	—N/a	—N/a
5 July 2002	London	England	Finsbury Park	40,562 / 40,562 (100%)	—N/a
6 July 2002	London	England	Finsbury Park	40,562 / 40,562 (100%)	—N/a
7 July 2002	London	England	Finsbury Park	40,562 / 40,562 (100%)	—N/a
10 July 2002	Newcastle	England	Telewest Arena	—N/a	—N/a
11 July 2002	Newcastle	England	Telewest Arena	—N/a	—N/a
13 July 2002	Kinross	Scotland	Balado Airfield	— (Note: The 13 July 2002 concert in Kinross was a part of T in the Park.)	
14 July 2002	Ratoath	Ireland	Fairyhouse Racecourse	— (Note: The 14 July 2002 concert in Ratoath was a part of Witnness.)	
16 July 2002	Vicenza	Italy	Stadio Romeo Menti	—N/a	—N/a
17 July 2002	Lucca	Italy	Piazza Napoleone	— (Note: The 17 July 2002 concert in Lucca was a part of the Lucca Summer Festival.)	
19 July 2002	Bern	Switzerland	Gurten Mountain	— (Note: The 19 July 2002 concert in Bern was a part of Gurtenfestival.)	
21 July 2002	Majorca	Spain	Calvià	— (Note: The 19 July 2002 concert in Bern was a part of Festival Isladencanta.)	
24 July 2002	Vigo	Spain	Parque de Castrelos	—N/a	—N/a
26 July 2002	Rome	Italy	Stadio del Tennis di Roma	—N/a	—N/a
27 July 2002	Rome	Italy	Stadio del Tennis di Roma	—N/a	—N/a
2 August 2002 (Note: Liam's voice gave out halfway during Go Let It Out and Noel did an impromptu acoustic set.)	Fort Lauderdale	United States	Pompano Beach Amphitheater	—N/a	—N/a
4 August 2002	Orlando	United States	Hard Rock Live	—N/a	—N/a
5 August 2002	Atlanta	United States	The Tabernacle	—N/a	—N/a
11 August 2002	New York City	United States	Roseland Ballroom	—N/a	—N/a
13 August 2002	New York City	United States	Beacon Theatre	—N/a	—N/a
14 August 2002	New York City	United States	Beacon Theatre	—N/a	—N/a
16 August 2002	Montreal	Canada	Molson Centre	—N/a	—N/a
17 August 2002	Toronto	Canada	Molson Canadian Amphitheatre	—N/a	—N/a
20 August 2002	Chicago	United States	Chicago Theatre	—N/a	—N/a
21 August 2002	Detroit	United States	Fox Theatre	—N/a	—N/a
7 September 2002	Derry	Northern Ireland	Prehen Playing Fields	—N/a	—N/a
9 September 2002	Aberdeen	Scotland	Press & Journal Arena	—N/a	—N/a
10 September 2002 (Note: Liam's voice gave out halfway during Better Man, he sang Acquiesce before leaving the stage and Noel did an impromptu acoustic encore.)	Aberdeen	Scotland	Press & Journal Arena	—N/a	—N/a
12 September 2002	Edinburgh	Scotland	Edinburgh Corn Exchange	—N/a	—N/a
14 September 2002	Manchester	England	Old Trafford Cricket Ground (Note: Billed as Lancashire County Cricket Club on tickets and posters.)	—N/a	—N/a
15 September 2002	Manchester	England	Old Trafford Cricket Ground	—N/a	—N/a
17 September 2002	Paris	France	Zénith de Paris	—N/a	—N/a
25 September 2002	Tokyo	Japan	Yoyogi National Gymnasium	—N/a	—N/a
26 September 2002	Tokyo	Japan	Yoyogi National Gymnasium	—N/a	—N/a
28 September 2002	Tokyo	Japan	Yoyogi National Gymnasium	—N/a	—N/a
29 September 2002	Tokyo	Japan	Yoyogi National Gymnasium	—N/a	—N/a
1 October 2002 (Note: Liam's voice gave out halfway during Morning Glory and Noel did an impromptu acoustic set.)	Fukuoka	Japan	Marine Messe Fukuoka	—N/a	—N/a
2 October 2002	Osaka	Japan	Osaka-jō Hall	—N/a	—N/a
3 October 2002	Osaka	Japan	Osaka-jō Hall	—N/a	—N/a
5 October 2002	Sendai	Japan	Sendai Gymnasium	—N/a	—N/a
7 October 2002	Hiroshima	Japan	Hiroshima Sun Plaza	—N/a	—N/a
8 October 2002	Nagoya	Japan	Nagoya Rainbow Hall	—N/a	—N/a
11 October 2002	Sydney	Australia	Enmore Theatre	—N/a	—N/a
12 October 2002	Brisbane	Australia	Brisbane Exhibition Ground	— (Note: The 12 October 2002 concert in Brisbane was a part of Livid.)	
14 October 2002	Canberra	Australia	Canberra Royal Theatre	—N/a	—N/a
15 October 2002	Newcastle	Australia	Newcastle Civic Theatre	—N/a	—N/a
17 October 2002	Melbourne	Australia	Forum Theatre	—N/a	—N/a
19 October 2002	Melbourne	Australia	Melbourne Park	— (Note: The 19 October 2002 concert in Melbourne was a part of Livid.)	
20 October 2002	Sydney	Australia	Moore Park	— (Note: The 19 October 2002 concert in Melbourne was a part of Livid.)	
23 October 2002	Melbourne	Australia	Forum Theatre	—N/a	—N/a
10 November 2002	Nottingham	England	National Ice Centre	—N/a	—N/a
11 November 2002	Nottingham	England	National Ice Centre	—N/a	—N/a
13 November 2002	Glasgow	Scotland	Braehead Arena	—N/a	—N/a
14 November 2002	Glasgow	Scotland	Braehead Arena	—N/a	—N/a
16 November 2002	Lille	France	Zénith de Lille	—N/a	—N/a
17 November 2002	Rennes	France	Le Liberté	—N/a	—N/a
19 November 2002	Salamanca	Spain	Pabellón de Würzburg	—N/a	—N/a
20 November 2002	Bilbao	Spain	Pabellón Municipal de Deportes La Casilla	—N/a	—N/a
22 November 2002	Milan	Italy	Forum di Assago	—N/a	—N/a
23 November 2002	Pesaro	Italy	PBA Palasport	—N/a	—N/a
25 November 2002	Zürich	Switzerland	Hallenstadion	—N/a	—N/a
28 November 2002	Stuttgart	Germany	Messe Congress Centrum	—N/a	—N/a
29 November 2002	Frankfurt	Germany	Jahrhunderthalle	—N/a	—N/a
8 December 2002	Cardiff	Wales	International Arena	—N/a	—N/a
9 December 2002	Cardiff	Wales	International Arena	—N/a	—N/a
11 December 2002	Brighton	England	Brighton Centre	—N/a	—N/a
12 December 2002	Plymouth	England	Plymouth Pavilions	—N/a	—N/a
14 December 2002	Sheffield	England	Hallam FM Arena	—N/a	—N/a
16 December 2002	Liverpool	England	Royal Court Theatre	—N/a	—N/a
18 December 2002	Birmingham	England	National Indoor Arena	—N/a	—N/a
19 December 2002	Birmingham	England	National Indoor Arena	—N/a	—N/a

List of 2003 concerts
Date	City	Country	Venue	Tickets Sold/Available	Box Office
5 March 2003	Dublin	Ireland	Point Theatre	—N/a	—N/a
6 March 2003	Dublin	Ireland	Point Theatre	—N/a	—N/a
8 March 2003	Hamburg	Germany	Color-Line Arena	—N/a	—N/a
9 March 2003	Düsseldorf	Germany	Philips Halle	—N/a	—N/a
11 March 2003	Munich	Germany	Munich Zenith	—N/a	—N/a
12 March 2003	Berlin	Germany	Arena Berlin	—N/a	—N/a

=== Cancellations and rescheduled shows ===
Date	City	Country	Venue	Reason
23 July 2002	Salamanca	Spain	Plaza de Toros La Glorieta	Throat infection sustained by Liam
7 August 2002	Indianapolis	United States	Murat Shrine	Cancelled due to band car crash
9 August 2002	Upper Darby Township	United States	Tower Theater	Cancelled due to band car crash
10 August 2002	Boston	United States	Fleet Pavilion	Cancelled due to band car crash
24 October 2002	Manila	Philippines	Araneta Colliseum	Cancelled due to security concerns following terrorist attacks in Bali, Indonesia, and Zamboanga City, Philippines
26 October 2002	Singapore		Singapore Indoor Stadium	Cancelled due to security concerns following terrorist attacks in Bali, Indonesia, and Zamboanga City, Philippines
1 December 2002	Munich	Germany	Zenith	Bar brawl in Munich, rescheduled to 11 March 2003
2 December 2002	Hamburg	Germany	Colour Line Arena	Bar brawl in Munich, rescheduled to 8 March 2003
4 December 2002	Düsseldorf	Germany	Philipshalle	Bar brawl in Munich, rescheduled to 9 March 2003
5 December 2002	Bremen	Germany	Pier 2	
