= 10 Years of Noise and Confusion Tour =

2001 concert tour by Oasis

- Tour by Oasis
- Ticket for the concert in London, England
- Location: United Kingdom
- Start date: 7 October 2001
- End date: 14 October 2001
- No. of shows: 6

Oasis concert chronology
- The Tour of Brotherly Love (2001); 10 Years of Noise and Confusion Tour (2001); Heathen Chemistry Tour (2002–03)

The 10 Years of Noise and Confusion Tour was a concert tour by English band Oasis, which took place between 7 October to 14 October 2001. The tour was to celebrate the band's formation 10 years earlier and was performed in smaller venues compared to the larger venues the band performed in during their rise to prominence.

The band had special guests on stage during the tour with Paul Weller coming on during the London dates and Johnny Marr coming on during the Manchester and Glasgow dates.

The first night in Glasgow was recorded and released as "Oasis: 10 Years of Noise and Confusion" on Sky Box Office, it would also be shown on several music video channels throughout the years before becoming available on Apple TV and Paramount+ in 2023.

== Set list ==
This set list is representative of the performance on 10 October 2001 at Manchester Apollo in Manchester. It does not represent the set list at all concerts for the duration of the tour.

"Fuckin' in the Bushes" (tape)

1. "Go Let It Out"
2. "Columbia"
3. "Morning Glory"
4. "Acquiesce"
5. "Supersonic"
6. "Fade Away"
7. "The Hindu Times"
8. "Half the World Away"
9. "Whatever"
10. "The Masterplan"
11. "Gas Panic!"
12. "Cigarettes & Alcohol"
13. "Live Forever"
14. "Hung in a Bad Place"
15. "Slide Away"
16. "She's Electric"
17. "Champagne Supernova"
18. "Rock 'n' Roll Star"

Encore

19. "Don't Look Back in Anger"
20. "I Am the Walrus"
21. "Roll with It"

Other songs performed:

1. "One Way Road"

== Tour dates ==
| Date | City | Country | Venue | Attendance |
|---|---|---|---|---|
| 7 October 2001 | London | England | Shepherd's Bush Empire | 2,000 / 2,000 |
| 8 October 2001 | London | England | Shepherd's Bush Empire | 2,000 / 2,000 |
| 10 October 2001 | Manchester | England | Manchester Apollo | 3,500 / 3,500 |
| 11 October 2001 | Manchester | England | Manchester Apollo | 3,500 / 3,500 |
| 13 October 2001 | Glasgow | Scotland | Barrowland Ballroom | 1,900 / 1,900 |
| 14 October 2001 | Glasgow | Scotland | Barrowland Ballroom | 1,900 / 1,900 |
