= Plays the Music of Oasis =

Studio album by Royal Philharmonic Orchestra
- Released: 21 October 1997
- Recorded: August 1997
- Studios: CTS Studios, London, England
- Genres: Easy listening Orchestral music
- Length: 59:58
- Label: Music Club

Royal Philharmonic Orchestra chronology
The Royal Philharmonic Orchestra (1997)	Plays the Music of Oasis (1997)	Stars & Stripes: America's Greatest Hits (1997)

Plays the Music of Oasis is an album by the Royal Philharmonic Orchestra, released on 21 October 1997 on the Music Club label. It contains the Orchestra's instrumental renderings of songs by the English rock band Oasis.

== Critical reception ==
Professional ratings
Review scores
Source	Rating
AllMusic	2.5/5 stars
Entertainment Weekly	B
The Indianapolis Star	3/4 stars
Stereo Review	1/5 stars
Uncut	2/5 stars
The Village Voice	C

Plays the Music of Oasis received largely negative reviews. Stephen Thomas Erlewine gave it 2.5 stars out of 5, writing, "The Royal Philharmonic's series of orchestral interpretations of pop music is of dubious merit -- no matter how good the source material is (Beatles, Dylan, Prince), they are albums that were made strictly for their novelty value and Play the Music of Oasis is no exception." J. D. Considine was also highly unfavorable in his review of the album, which he described as "a dozen Oasis songs in dreary, elevator music-style orchestrations". In another negative review, Brett Milano compared Plays the Music of Oasis to similar albums released in the 1960s that consisted of orchestral versions of Beatles songs. Milano wrote, "...it's good to know that some things never change, because the "tribute" by the Royal Philharmonic sounds just as clumsy as any rock/classical crossover that Arthur Fiedler or the Hollyridge Strings ever attempted." Similarly, Mark Jenkins wrote in The Washington Post that "[d]espite the presence of the orchestra, this is just banal instrumental rock."

Scott Bacon of the Indianapolis Star was more favorable in his review of the album, giving it 3 out of 4 stars and stating, "The RPO's timeless take on these numbers made it seem like they really could have been penned by the Beatles". Another relatively favorable review came from Tom Latham, who gave the album a B grade and wrote that "the overall tone of The Royal Philharmonic Orchestra Plays the Music of Oasis is so playful, so reverent of brother Noel’s Beatlesque muse, the set actually works."

== Track listing ==
All tracks written by Noel Gallagher, except where noted.

No.	Title	Length
1.	"Roll with It"	3:54
2.	"Live Forever"	4:46
3.	"Rock 'n' Roll Star"	5:02
4.	"Cigarettes and Alcohol"	4:30
5.	"Shakermaker" (Bill Backer, Roger Cook, Billy Davis, Noel Gallagher)	5:13
6.	"Up in the Sky"	4:43
7.	"Don't Look Back in Anger"	4:48
8.	"Wonderwall"	4:58
9.	"Supersonic"	5:08
10.	"She's Electric"	4:00
11.	"Some Might Say"	5:43
12.	"Champagne Supernova"	7:13
