= Live by the Sea =

Video by Oasis
- Released: 28 August 1995
- Recorded: 17 April 1995 at Cliffs Pavilion, Southend-on-Sea, Essex
- Length: 80:20
- Label: Picture Music International; Big Brother Recordings (reissue)

Oasis video chronology
Live by the Sea (1995)	...There and Then (1996)

Live by the Sea is a live video recording by the English rock band Oasis, released on DVD, VCD, and VHS. It features Oasis' gig at the Southend Cliffs Pavilion on 17 April 1995, as well as the videos for "Rock 'n' Roll Star" and "Cigarettes & Alcohol". The title is a pun on a line from the song "(It's Good) To Be Free".

== History and release ==
The seventeen-track recording was filmed on 17 April 1995 and then released onto VHS on 28 August 1995 and VCD in 1996. Following Big Brother Recordings' purchase of the Oasis catalogue, the album was re-released in 2001 on DVD. The front cover displays the familiar Oasis logo with a blue background instead of a black one, the same logo used on the "Live Forever" single. This is their only live recording release with the drummer Tony McCarroll.

== Track listing ==
All songs by Noel Gallagher, except "I Am the Walrus", by Lennon–McCartney.

1. "Rock 'n' Roll Star"
2. "Columbia"
3. "Digsy's Dinner"
4. "Some Might Say"
5. "Live Forever"
6. "Up in the Sky"
7. "Acquiesce"
8. "Headshrinker"
9. "(It's Good) To Be Free"
10. "Cigarettes & Alcohol"
11. "Married with Children"
12. "Sad Song" *
13. "D'Yer Wanna Be a Spaceman?" * (stopped halfway through due to Noel forgetting the lines of the song)
14. "Talk Tonight" *
15. "Slide Away"
16. "Supersonic"
17. "I Am the Walrus"

Bonus music videos on 2001 DVD

18. "Rock 'n' Roll Star"
19. "Cigarettes & Alcohol"

* Noel Gallagher's solo acoustic set

== Personnel ==
- Liam Gallagher – lead vocals, tambourine
- Noel Gallagher – lead guitar, backing vocals (lead vocals and acoustic guitar during Noel's solo acoustic set)
- Paul "Bonehead" Arthurs – rhythm guitar
- Paul "Guigsy" McGuigan – bass guitar
- Tony McCarroll – drums

== Certifications ==
Region	Certification	Certified units/sales
Australia (ARIA)	Gold	7,500^{^}
United Kingdom (BPI)	3× Platinum	150,000^{^}
^{^} Shipments figures based on certification alone.
