= Roadmender =

Roadmender may refer to:

- The Roadmender, a 1902 Christian spiritual book by Margaret Barber
- Roadmender (nightclub), a nightclub and concert venue in Northampton
