= The Tour of Brotherly Love =

2001 concert tour

Tour of Brotherly Love
- Tour by the Black Crowes, Oasis and Spacehog
- Tour logo
- Location: North America
- Start date: May 11, 2001
- End date: June 11, 2001
- Legs: 1
- No. of shows: 19 (21 scheduled)

Oasis tour chronology
- Standing on the Shoulder of Giants Tour (1999–2001); The Tour of Brotherly Love (2001); 10 Years of Noise and Confusion Tour (2001)

The Tour of Brotherly Love was a concert tour featuring Oasis, The Black Crowes, and Spacehog, three rock bands featuring pairs of brothers: Noel and Liam Gallagher, Chris and Rich Robinson, Royston and Antony Langdon, respectively. The tour's title is a nod to the fact that all three pairs of brothers have been known to fight: sometimes physically, and sometimes even publicly.

Originally scheduled for 21 dates across the United States and Canada, the three bands performed to capacity crowds in medium-sized arenas and concert halls, including a three-night stand at Radio City Music Hall in New York. Prior to the tour's two dates at The Greek Theatre in Los Angeles, The Black Crowes were inducted into the Guitar Center Rockwalk, a walk of fame honoring notable musical acts and artists. Noel Gallagher and Slash were on hand for the ceremony.

Noel Gallagher and Gem Archer of Oasis and the Langdon brothers of Spacehog joined The Black Crowes on stage at the end of most shows on the tour, performing covers of songs by Led Zeppelin, Fleetwood Mac, David Bowie, Pink Floyd and The Rolling Stones. Oasis drummer Alan White missed the tour with a thumb injury and was replaced by older brother Steve White, drummer for Paul Weller.

The May 24 date in Cincinnati, was canceled when the stage, backstage and pavilion of the Riverbend Music Center were flooded by forty-five feet of water from the rising Ohio River. The May 29 show in Pittsburgh, Pennsylvania was canceled because of the tour re-rerouting following the Cincinnati cancellation.

== Setlists ==
Oasis

1. "Go Let It Out"
2. "Columbia"
3. "Morning Glory"
4. "Fade Away"
5. "Some Might Say"/"Acquiesce"
6. "Gas Panic!"
7. "Cigarettes & Alcohol"
8. "Step Out"
9. "Slide Away"
10. "Champagne Supernova"
11. "Don't Look Back in Anger"
12. "I Am the Walrus"

The Black Crowes

1. "Midnight From The Inside Out"
2. "Greasy Grass River"
3. "Sting Me"
4. "Twice As Hard"
5. "Lickin'"
6. "Cursed Diamond"
7. "Soul Singing"
8. "My Morning Song"
9. "Young Old Man"
10. "Cosmic Friend"
11. "Remedy"
12. "Oh Well"

== Tour dates ==
Date	City	Country	Venue
May 11, 2001	Paradise	United States	The Joint @ The Hard Rock Hotel
May 12, 2001	Santa Barbara	United States	Santa Barbara Bowl
May 14, 2001	Los Angeles	United States	Greek Theatre
May 15, 2001	Los Angeles	United States	Greek Theatre
May 17, 2001	Greenwood Village	United States	Coors Amphitheatre
May 19, 2001	Saint Paul	United States	Xcel Energy Center
May 20, 2001	Tinley Park	United States	New World Music Theater
May 22, 2001	Toronto	Canada	Molson Amphitheatre
May 24, 2001	Cincinnati	United States	~~Riverbend Music Center~~ canceled
May 25, 2001	Cuyahoga Falls	United States	Blossom Music Center
May 27, 2001	Wallingford	United States	Oakdale Theater
May 29, 2001	Pittsburgh	United States	~~A. J. Palumbo Center~~ canceled
May 30, 2001	Camden	United States	Tweeter Center at the Waterfront
June 1, 2001	Noblesville	United States	Deer Creek Music Center
June 2, 2001	Clarkston	United States	Pine Knob Music Theatre
June 3, 2001	Corfu	United States	Darien Lake Performing Arts Center
June 5, 2001	Columbia	United States	Merriweather Post Pavilion
June 7, 2001	New York City	United States	Radio City Music Hall
June 8, 2001	New York City	United States	Radio City Music Hall
June 9, 2001	New York City	United States	Radio City Music Hall
June 11, 2001	Mansfield	United States	Tweeter Center for the Performing Arts

== Videos ==
Black Crowes video from The Tour of Brotherly Love at the Greek Theatre in LA (5/15/2001)

== Touring personnel (Black Crowes) ==
Band:

- Chris Robinson – Vocals
- Rich Robinson – Guitars, Vocals
- Steve Gorman – Drums
- Eddie Harsch – Keyboards
- Audley Freed – Guitars
- Andy Hess – Bass

Management:

- Amy Finkle - Tour Manager
- Urie Vega - Assistant Tour Manager
- Stan Green - Production Manager/Lighting Designer
- Ian Day - Stage Manager
- Jeff Dunn - Sound Engineer (FOH)
- Drew Consalvo - Sound Engineer (Monitors)
- Richard Zimmer - Accountant

Crew:

- Jeff Bertush - Lighting Technician/Operator
- Ian Dobson - Lighting Technician
- Kathy Beer - Lighting Technician
- Jim Keegan - Lighting Technician
- Joseph Dougherty - Sound Technician
- Randy Halsing - Sound Technician
- Ed Dracoules - Sound Technician
- Robert Miller - Sound Technician
- Greg Howard - Technician
- John "Noodles" Weber - Technician
- Derek Phelps - Technician
