= Columbia (Oasis song) =

Promotional single by Oasis

from the album Definitely Maybe
- Released: 1993
- Studio: Sawmills Studios, Cornwall
- Genre: Britpop; rock
- Length: 5:24 (White Label Demo); 6:17 (album version); 4:48 (live); 4:47 (Knebworth 1996)
- Label: Creation
- Songwriter: Noel Gallagher
- Producers: Mark Coyle; Owen Morris; Oasis

Definitely Maybe track listing
- 11 tracks: 1. "Rock 'n' Roll Star"; 2. "Shakermaker"; 3. "Live Forever"; 4. "Up in the Sky"; 5. "Columbia"; 6. "Supersonic"; 7. "Bring It on Down"; 8. "Cigarettes & Alcohol"; 9. "Digsy's Dinner"; 10. "Slide Away"; 11. "Married with Children"

Lyric video
- "Columbia" on YouTube

"Columbia" is a song by English rock band Oasis. The song features on their 1994 debut album, Definitely Maybe.

== Writing and recording ==
"Columbia" was one of the first songs Noel Gallagher ever wrote in Oasis, likely dating back to late 1991. The song was named after the Columbia Hotel in London; however, the meaning of its lyrics remain ambiguous. The writing of the song is credited exclusively to Noel. However, Liam Gallagher had involvement in the song's conception, having created the melody and written the chorus during a jamming session.

The song received its live debut on 15 January 1992 at Oasis' second gig at the Boardwalk in Manchester where they opened their set with it. Columbia is the 5th track on Oasis debut album Definitely Maybe.

The song was featured on Oasis' Columbia White Label Demo that got them signed to Alan McGee's label Creation Records, and was also performed at the band's King Tut's Wah Wah Hut gig in which McGee first saw the band. The stripped-down, White Label Demo version of the song, lasting 5:25, is one of the B-sides on Oasis' 1994 debut single "Supersonic".

== Composition and lyrics ==
"Columbia" has a relatively basic composition using a 4/4 time signature at 101 BPM. The song includes a long instrumental coda, and was recorded at Sawmills Studio, Cornwall. The song was initially planned to be an instrumental. When questioned about the lyrics, Noel stated that he wasn't trying to impress anybody with them. Tape delay was used to double up the sound of the drums on the song.

== Release history ==
"Columbia" was first issued as a promotional single in 1993 and was played on BBC Radio 1. before the White Label Demo version of the song was released as B-side to "Supersonic" in 1994. A few months later the polished studio version of it was released as the 5th track on Definitely Maybe. Since then, live performances of the song have been released in 2003 and 2021 as a B-side to "Songbird" and on Knebworth 1996.

== Reception ==
In a ranking of all Oasis songs by NME, "Columbia" placed seventh out of 149 songs whilst in a ranking of all Oasis B-sides from Mojo, the 2003 live performance of "Columbia" (B-side to "Songbird") was ranked 49th out of 57, whilst the White Label Demo being ranked in 11th. Speaking in an interview in 2010, Oasis rhythm guitarist Paul "Bonehead" Arthurs cited "Columbia" as his favourite Oasis song, mainly because its simple chord structure made it easy to play live.

== Commercial performance ==
"Columbia" was originally released as a promotional single in 1993 and, therefore, ineligible to chart in the UK. However, the song was reissued as a CD in 2014 alongside the 20th anniversary release of Definitely Maybe, following which it charted at number 111 in the UK, number 78 in Scotland, and topped the UK Physical singles chart one spot above "Acquiesce", which was also reissued the same week. The song has since been certified silver by BPI.

== Live performances ==
"Columbia" was performed regularly during the Definitely Maybe tour and on occasion on the (What's The Story) Morning Glory? tour including Oasis' two nights at Knebworth Park. It continued to be played occasionally during the Standing on the Shoulder of Giants Tour. It was regularly played during the Tour of Brotherly Love, the 10 Years of Noise and Confusion tour and the Heathen Chemistry tour.

Since their disbandment, Liam Gallagher regularly played it during his solo shows. On 15 and 16 June 2024, during his 30th anniversary album tour at the Co-op Live, he performed the Sawmills Studios version of which includes a 10-second rap. This version is included on the 30th anniversary edition of the Definitely Maybe album released as a single on 13 June 2024.

== Personnel ==
- Liam Gallagher – vocals
- Noel Gallagher – lead guitar
- Paul "Bonehead" Arthurs – rhythm guitar
- Paul "Guigsy" McGuigan – bass guitar
- Tony McCarroll – drums

== Charts ==
Weekly chart performance for "Columbia"
Chart (2014)	Peak position
Scotland (OCC)	78
UK Physical Singles (OCC)	1
UK Singles (OCC)	111

== Certifications ==
Certifications and sales for "Columbia"
Region	Certification	Certified units/sales
United Kingdom (BPI)	Silver	200,000^{‡}
^{‡} Sales+streaming figures based on certification alone.
