= Roadmender (nightclub) =

Live music venue in Lady's Lane, Northampton, England

Coordinates: 52°14′25″N 0°53′57″W

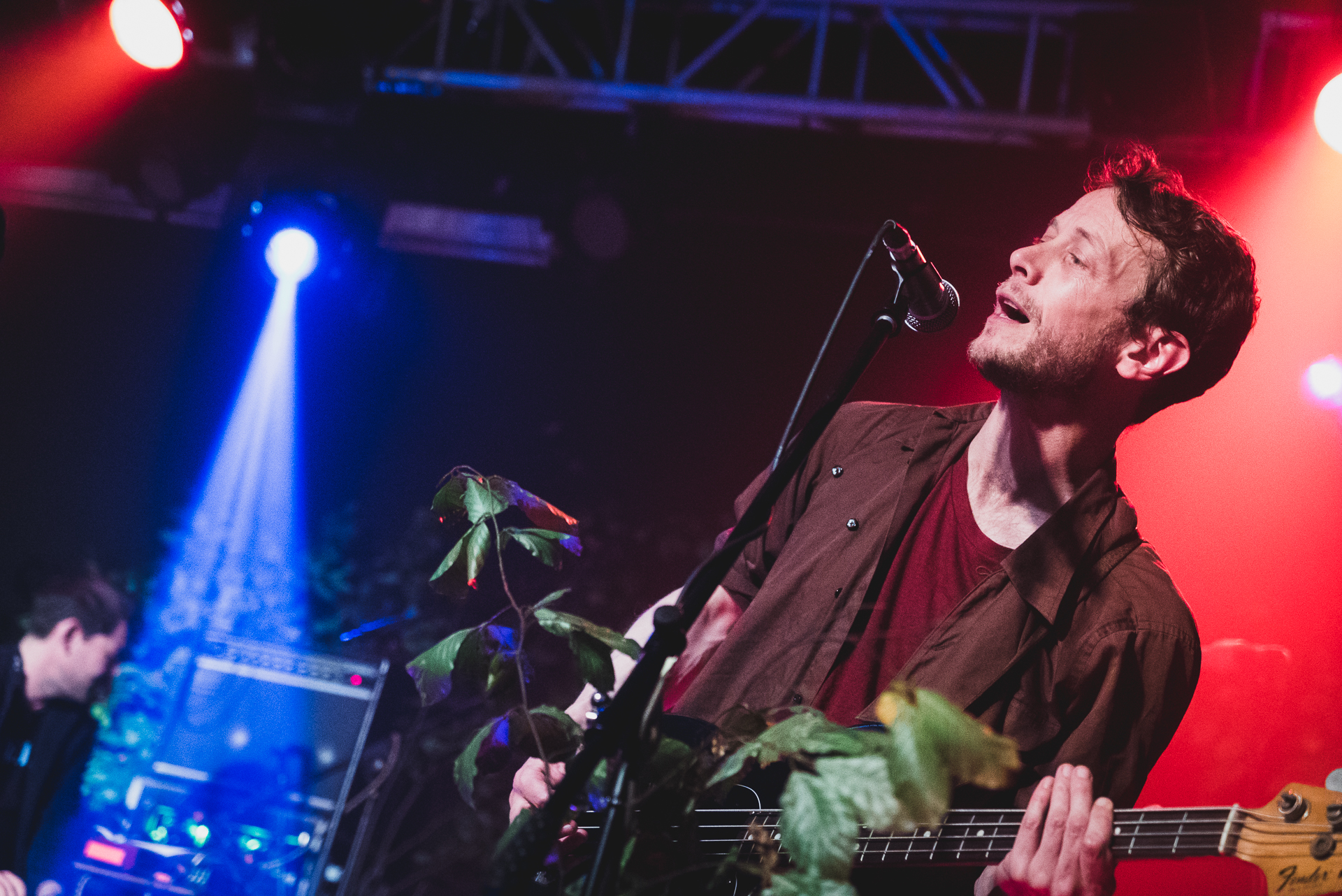
British Sea Power at the Roadmender, 2017

Roadmender (also known as Northampton Roadmender or the Roadmender Centre) is a live music venue in Lady's Lane, Northampton, England. Housed in a former school building, the venue has become an iconic part of the town's cultural landscape. As the only major live venue in Northampton, Roadmender has played a significant role in shaping the experiences of generations of local music enthusiasts. It remains the most recognised indie club remaining in regular operation, particularly following the closures of Bass Clef in 1999 and the Irish Centre in 1997.

== History ==
The Roadmender started life as a youth club built in an entirely different location to the one on which it operates today. Named after the 1902 book by Michael Fairless, the club was established to cater for the "no-collar" boys and girls of the Boroughs area of Northampton. Jill Harrold wrote:

By 1937 the club nearly had 400 members and the club moved its headquarters to Gloucester House in Far Cotton. The departure of founding father Mr Harrison in 1939 didn’t curb the rapid growth of the organisation. The value of Roadmender to the local community was obvious, so money was found for brand new premises despite the imminent war. The Dalgleish-designed building in Ladys Lane which houses Roadmender to this date, opened in October 1940. Back then; the Duke of Gloucester was National President of the Roadmender movement, while Earl Spencer filled the position as President of the Northampton Roadmender Club. However, there is nothing particularly posh about Roadmender, and everyone has been welcomed throughout the years.

In the 1980s, The Roadmender hosted a community arts program that offered activities such as printing, textiles, music and theatre. These activities were primarily aimemd at supporting the disadvantaged young people for whom The Roadmender was originally established.

From the early 1980s to the late 1990s, The Roadmender was the leading music and arts centre in Northamptonshire. As the largest venue for touring bands between London and Birmingham, it became an essential stop for artists such as Radiohead, Metallica, Oasis, Travis and the Manic Street Preachers. However, its prominence declined following a refurbishment in 1999/2000 which reduced the capacity of its main hall from 1,000 to 850.

Formerly a county council funded arts centre with a remit for arts, dance, live and recorded music, The Roadmender has had a varied history facing closure and bankruptcy several times during a long and complicated history.

Its most recent closure occurred in late 2005 when it lost several hundred thousand pounds of council funding which forced its then owners Roadmender Ltd into liquidation. After several failed rescue attempts the brand and building were sold to Purplehaus, the owners of a nearby nightclub The Soundhaus, who rebranded it New Roadmender. Notable performances since its reopening have included Idlewild, The Maccabees, Marillion, Kate Nash, Biffy Clyro, Finch, We Are Scientists, Little Boots (supported by Ellie Goulding), Deftones, Enter Shikari, Happy Mondays, The Dead South and the NME tour.

Senegalese musician Youssou N'Dour played the Roadmender on 18 December 2002.
