= Glasgow Cathouse =

Nightclub in Glasgow, Scotland

Coordinates: 55.8588046°N 4.2568749°W

The Glasgow Cathouse (also known as the Cathouse Rock Club) is a long-established alternative music nightclub on Union Street in Glasgow. It is well known for hosting live gigs, with globally successful, mainstream bands such as Oasis, Pearl Jam and Fall Out Boy have played there in their fledgling years.

The club has also been host to acts such as DragonForce, Lordi, Zebrahead, SOiL, Mr. Bungle, Jayne County and Glenn Hughes.

== History ==
The Cathouse was founded by Donald MacLeod and was launched in 1990 in the now-demolished Hollywood Studios building on Brown Street. The club moved to its current home on Union Street in 1997, and forms part of Hold Fast Entertainment Ltd which also own The Garage.

The Union St property was leased until 2005, but was eventually purchased by Hold Fast Entertainment, and was thoroughly refurbished with a relaunch party at the end of October 2005.

The Cathouse celebrated its 25th birthday in 2015, with a special performance from Anthrax.

In April 2025 it was announced that employees had raised a collective formal grievance against the venue due to issues with working conditions and health and safety.
