= Definitely Maybe =

1994 studio album by Oasis

Studio album by Oasis
- Released: 29 August 1994
- Recorded: 17 December 1993 – 3 May 1994 (Note: "Married with Children" was recorded on a Fostex eight-track recorder in Mark Coyle's living room, but the exact date of recording is unknown.)
- Studios: Clear (Manchester); Out of the Blue (Manchester); Monnow Valley (Rockfield, Wales); Sawmills (Cornwall); Pink Museum (Liverpool); Matrix (London)
- Genres: Britpop; rock
- Length: 51:57
- Label: Creation
- Producers: Owen Morris; Oasis; Mark Coyle; David Batchelor

Oasis chronology
Definitely Maybe (1994)	(What's the Story) Morning Glory? (1995)

Singles from Definitely Maybe
- 1. "Supersonic" Released: 11 April 1994; 2. "Shakermaker" Released: 20 June 1994; 3. "Live Forever" Released: 8 August 1994; 4. "Cigarettes & Alcohol" Released: 10 October 1994

Definitely Maybe is the debut studio album by the English rock band Oasis, released on 29 August 1994 by Creation Records. The album features Noel Gallagher on lead guitar, backing vocals and as chief songwriter, Liam Gallagher on lead vocals, Paul "Bonehead" Arthurs on rhythm guitar, Paul "Guigsy" McGuigan on bass guitar and Tony McCarroll on drums.

The band booked Monnow Valley Studio near Rockfield in January 1994 to record the album; they worked with producer Dave Batchelor, whom Noel knew from his time working as a roadie for the Inspiral Carpets. However, sessions were unsatisfactory, and Batchelor was subsequently fired. In February 1994, the group began re-recording the album at Sawmills Studios in Cornwall, where Noel produced sessions alongside Mark Coyle. The results were still deemed unsatisfactory; in desperation, manager Marcus Russell contacted engineer and producer Owen Morris, who eventually worked on mixing the album at Loco Studios in Wales, and later The Matrix in London, where Liam re-recorded some of his lead vocals. The album was then mastered at Johnny Marr's studio in Manchester.

Definitely Maybe was an immediate commercial success in the United Kingdom, having followed on the heels of the singles "Supersonic", "Shakermaker", and the UK top-ten hit "Live Forever", which was also a success on US modern rock radio. It went straight to number one in the UK Albums Chart and became the fastest-selling debut album in British music history at the time; it went on to be certified 10× platinum by the BPI for sales of over 3 million units. It was also successful in the United States, being certified platinum by the Recording Industry Association of America (RIAA). The album went on to sell over 15 million copies worldwide. It is the only Oasis album to feature all five original members completely; drummer Tony McCarroll was ejected from the band in April 1995.

Upon release, Definitely Maybe received widespread critical acclaim and helped to spur a revitalisation in British pop/rock music in the 1990s. It was embraced by critics for its optimistic themes and rejection of the negative outlook of much of the grunge music of the time and is regarded as a cornerstone of the Britpop genre, having since appeared in many publications' lists of the greatest albums of all time. In 2006, the NME conducted a readers' poll in which Definitely Maybe was voted the greatest album ever. In 2015, Spin included the album in their list of "The 300 Best Albums of 1985–2014". Rolling Stone ranked the album at number 217 on its 2020 list of the 500 Greatest Albums of All Time.

== Background and recording ==
Formerly called the Rain, Oasis was formed in 1991 by Paul "Bonehead" Arthurs, Paul "Guigsy" McGuigan, Tony McCarroll and Liam Gallagher. Liam soon asked his older brother, Noel Gallagher, to join. Despite reports that Noel insisted on total creative control and leadership, he said in 2016: "There is the myth that I kicked open the fucking rehearsal room door to the theme tune to The Good, the Bad and the Ugly and said 'Everybody stop what they're doing. I am here to make us all millionaires', you know? It wasn't that at all". Although Noel wrote all the album's songs, Bonehead said, "I came up with the riff for 'Up in the Sky' and he built the song around that one but generally Noel would arrive with the finished song".

After recording "Supersonic" at the Pink Museum Studios in Liverpool in December 1993, Oasis booked Monnow Valley Studio near Rockfield to record the album in early January 1994. The producer was Dave Batchelor, whom Noel knew from working as a roadie for the Inspiral Carpets. The sessions were unsatisfactory, and Bonehead recalled, "It wasn't happening. [Batchelor] was the wrong person for the job... we'd play in this great big room, buzzing to be in this studio, playing like we always played. He'd say, 'Come in and have a listen.' And we'd be like, 'That doesn't sound like it sounded in that room. What's that?' It was thin. Weak. Too clean."

Additionally, engineer Dave Scott commented, "I couldn't connect with him [Batchelor] artistically or technically, neither could I get any idea from him what his vision for the album was. This made life very difficult for me. I had rarely worked under other producers and when I had, there had always been a collaboration. I think that the lack of direction and different expectations led to an uncoordinated session with too many compromises." Scott described various technical issues that befell the sessions, including defective equipment, poor quality headphones, and excessive sound variation between mixing channels. Batchelor fired him after two clashes while recording "Slide Away", and later informed him that "Slide Away" was the only track kept from the sessions.

The sessions at Monnow Valley were costing £800 a day. As the sessions proved increasingly fruitless, the group began to panic. Bonehead said, "Noel was frantically on the phone to the management, going, 'This ain't working.' For it not to be happening was a bit frightening." Batchelor was fired, and Noel tried to make use of the music already recorded by taking the tapes to a number of London studios. Tim Abbot of Creation Records said while visiting the band in Chiswick, "McGee, Noel, me, and various people had a great sesh [session], and we listened to it over and over again. And all I could think was, 'It ain't got the attack.' There was no immediacy." Liam Gallagher would say years later that the recordings at Monnow Valley were also characterised by the presence of a "ghost".

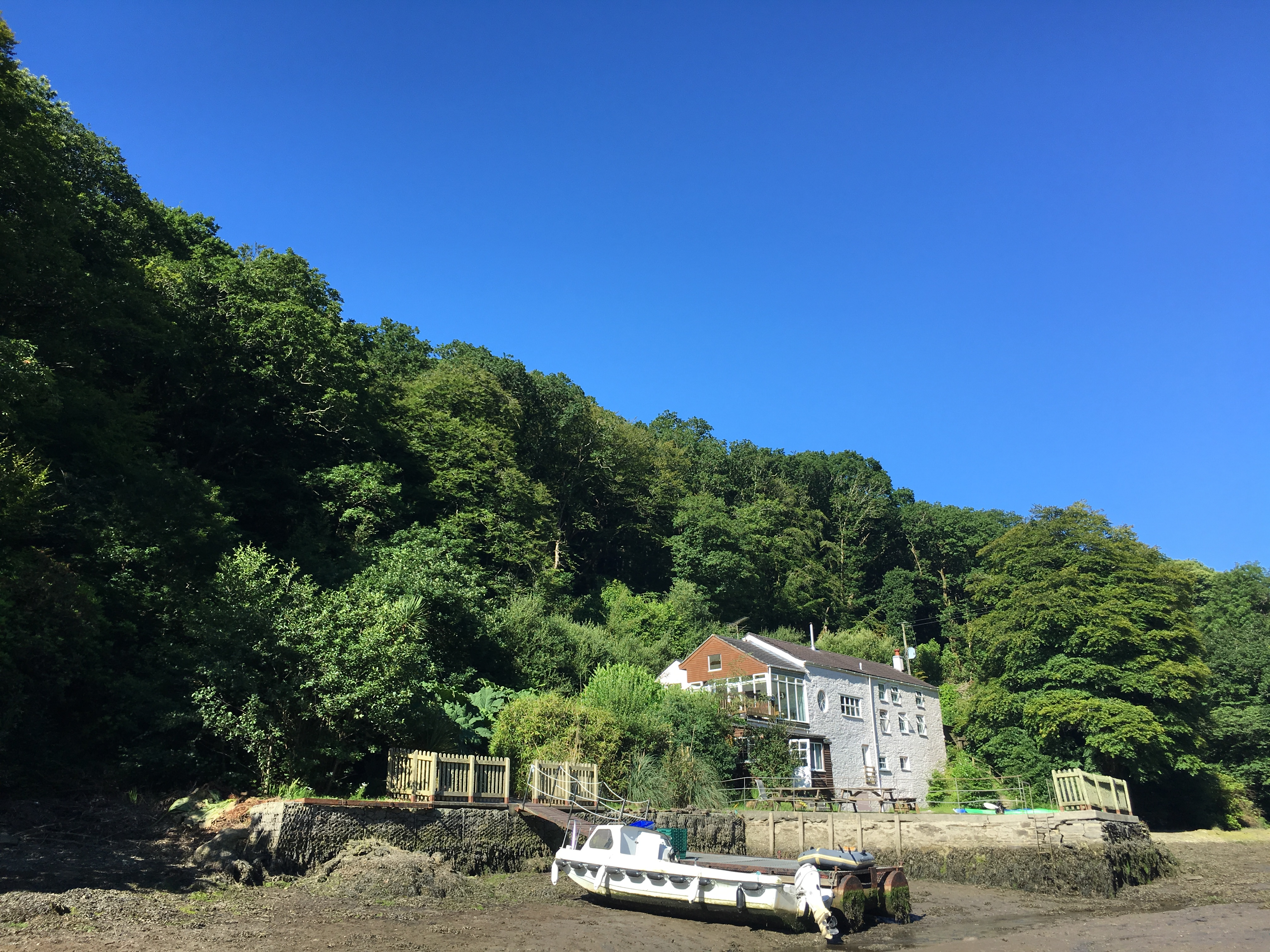
Oasis continued the album's recording sessions at Sawmills Studios in Cornwall in February

In February 1994, the group returned from an ill-fated trip to Amsterdam and set about re-recording the album at Sawmills Studios in Cornwall. This time, Noel produced the sessions alongside Mark Coyle. The group decided to replicate their live sound in the studio by recording together without soundproofing between individual instruments, with Noel overdubbing numerous guitars afterward. Bonehead said, "That was Noel's favourite trick: get the drums, bass, and rhythm guitar down, and then he'd cane it. 'Less is more' didn't really work then." The results were still deemed unsatisfactory, and there was little chance of another attempt at recording the album, so the recordings already made had to be used.

In desperation, the band's manager Marcus Russell contacted engineer and producer Owen Morris, who had mixed the album's songs. Morris recalled after hearing the Sawmills recordings, "I just thought, 'They've messed up here.' I guessed at that stage Noel was completely fucked off. Marcus was like, 'You can do what you like – literally, whatever you want.'" Morris first worked on mixing the album at Loco Studios in Wales in late April, and then The Matrix in London at the start of May. Among Morris's first tasks was to strip away the layers of guitar overdubs Noel had added, although he noted that the overdubs allowed him to construct the musical dynamics of songs such as "Columbia" and "Rock 'n' Roll Star".

After finishing mixing, Morris worked on mastering the album at Johnny Marr's studio in Manchester. He recalled that Marr was "appalled by how 'in your face' the whole thing was" and would question Morris's mixing choices, such as leaving the background noise at the beginning of "Cigarettes & Alcohol". Inspired by Phil Spector's use of tape delay on the drums of John Lennon's song "Instant Karma!" and Tony Visconti's use of the Eventide Harmonizer on the drums of David Bowie's album Low, Morris added eighth-note tape delays on the drums, which lent additional groove to McCarroll's basic beats. Tape delay was employed to double the drums of "Columbia", giving the song a faster rhythm, and tambourines were programmed on several songs to follow McCarroll's snare hits.

Morris also used a technique he had learned from Bernard Sumner while recording the self-titled album by Sumner's group Electronic, routing the bass guitar through a Minimoog and using the filters to remove the high end, which he used to hide imprecise playing, and heavily compressed the final mix to an extent he admitted was "more than would normally be considered 'professional'".

Morris completed his final mix of the record on the vintage Neve console during the bank holiday weekend in May in Studio 5 at Matrix Recording Studios in London's Fulham district. Music journalist John Harris noted, "The miracle was that music that had passed through so many hands sounded so dynamic: the guitar-heavy stew that Morris had inherited had been remoulded into something positively pile-driving."

However, engineer Anjali Dutt criticised the abrasive mix: "Though I don't think that the original mixes were amazing, I did prefer them to the final album, as the relentlessness of the compressed chainsaw guitars just wears you out even if the initial feeling of excitement is invigorating. ... I think his mixes did the job and gave it that much needed excitement and attitude. But it wasn't my kind of sound and found it far too abrasive so I can only recall ever playing a few tracks at a time."

== Cover art ==
The photograph on the front cover of the album was taken by rock photographer Michael Spencer Jones in guitarist Bonehead's house in Didsbury, Manchester. The image was inspired by the back cover of the Beatles' 1966 compilation LP A Collection of Beatles Oldies, and, in the positioning of Liam on the floor, by a visit Spencer Jones had made to the Egyptology section at the Science and Industry Museum. In a 2019 interview, Spencer Jones said that the idea to photograph the band at Bonehead's house came from Noel, who originally wanted the band to be seated around Bonehead's dining table; Spencer Jones instead suggested shooting in the lounge, facing a bay window. He also said that he asked Liam to lie on the floor to draw attention away from the room's wood flooring, which he felt would make the picture look like an advert for varnish. The wine glass to Liam's right was filled with diluted Ribena; although an urban legend suggests that this was used because the band could not afford wine, Spencer Jones explained that it was actually because red wine often turns out black instead of red on pictures.

Spencer Jones asked the band to bring objects of personal value to them to the shoot. Cannon drew inspiration from Jan van Eyck's Flemish Renaissance painting Arnolfini Portrait (1434) for the way it is "littered with visual metaphors", and applied the same significance for the objects on the Definitely Maybe sleeve. According to Spencer Jones, this was Noel's favourite film. A picture of footballer Rodney Marsh playing for Manchester City (the football team of the Gallaghers and McGuigan) is propped against the fireplace. A photograph of footballer George Best can be seen in the window at the behest of Bonehead, a Manchester United fan. A poster (actually the inside of a gatefold sleeve) of Burt Bacharach, one of Noel's idols, is also shown leaning against the side of the sofa on the lower left-hand side of the cover. Bonehead's Epiphone Riviera, which he used on every Oasis recording and gig during his tenure in the band, is propped against the wall. Some writers believe that Oasis were trying to pay homage to the album cover of Pink Floyd's Ummagumma (1969) by placing Bacharach's picture in the same prominent position used for the soundtrack of Vincente Minnelli's film Gigi on Ummagumma.

== Release and promotion ==
Oasis signed to independent label Creation Records in 1993. The limited-edition 12-inch single "Columbia" was released later that year as a teaser for journalists and radio shows, and was unexpectedly picked up by BBC Radio 1, which played it 19 times in the fortnight after its release. The band's first commercial single "Supersonic" was released on 11 April 1994. The following week, it debuted at No. 31 on the British singles chart. The song was followed by "Shakermaker" in June 1994, which debuted at No. 11 and earned the group an appearance on Top of the Pops.

The release of Definitely Maybe was preceded by a third single, "Live Forever", released on 8 August 1994, which became the group's first top 10 single. Oasis's continued success helped Creation ride out a period of tough financial straits; the label was still £2 million in debt, so Tim Abbot was given only £60,000 to promote the upcoming album. Abbot tried to determine how to best use his small budget: "I'd go back to the Midlands every couple of weeks and people I knew would say, 'Oasis are great. This is what we listen to.' And I'd be thinking, 'Well, you lot don't buy singles. You don't read the NME. You don't read Q. How do we get the people to like you?'" Abbot decided to place ads in publications that had never been approached by Creation before, such as football magazines, match programmes, and UK dance music periodicals. His suspicions that Oasis would appeal to these non-traditional audiences were confirmed when the dance music magazine Mixmag, which usually ignored guitar-based music, gave Definitely Maybe a five-star review.

Definitely Maybe was released on 29 August 1994. The album sold 100,000 copies in its first four days. On 4 September, the album debuted at No. 1 on the British charts. It outsold the second-highest album (The Three Tenors in Concert 1994, which had been favoured to be the chart-topper that week), by a factor of 50%. The first-week sales earned Definitely Maybe the record of the fastest-selling debut album in British history. "Cigarettes & Alcohol" was released as the fourth single from the album in October, peaking at No. 7 in the UK, which was then a career high for the band. Noel said "Slide Away" was considered as a fifth single, but he ultimately refused, arguing, "You can't have five [singles] off a debut album."

== Critical reception ==
Professional ratings
Contemporary reviews
Review scores
Source	Rating
Chicago Sun-Times	3.5/4 stars
Fort Worth Star-Telegram	3.5/5 stars
Music Week	5/5 stars
NME	9/10
Q	4/5 stars
Select	5/5
Smash Hits	5/5 stars
Vox	8/10

Definitely Maybe received widespread critical acclaim and was a commercial success, with many critics and listeners welcoming the album's fearless optimism, particularly in an era of rock which was dominated by American grunge which seemed at odds with the album. Noel's songwriting and melodic skills, along with Liam's vocals, received particular praise. Keith Cameron of NME called Noel "a pop craftsman in the classic tradition and a master of his trade" and believed that "the only equivocal thing about Definitely Maybe is its title ... everything else screams certainty ... the fact is that too much heartfelt emotion, ingenious belief and patent songwriting savvy rushes through the debut Oasis album for it to be the work of a bunch of wind-up merchants ... it's like opening your bedroom curtains one morning and discovering that some f—er's built the Taj Mahal in your back garden and then filled it with your favourite flavour of Angel Delight". Melody Maker gave the album its star rating signifying a "bloody essential" purchase, and its critic Paul Lester said, "Of all the great new British pop groups, Oasis are the least playful, the least concerned with post-modern sleights of influence ... Definitely Maybe is 'What the World's Been Waiting For', a record full of songs to live to, made by a gang of reckless northern reprobates who you can easily dream of joining ... If you don't agree it offers a dozen opportunities to believe that 1994 is the best year ever for pop/rock music, then you're wrong".

Stuart Maconie of Q described Definitely Maybe as "an outrageously exciting rock/pop album ... a rutting mess of glam, punk, and psychedelia, you've heard it all before of course, but not since the Stone Roses debut have a young Lancastrian group carried themselves with such vigour and insouciance". Vox's Mike Pattenden stated that "occasionally – and in this voracious, selfish, faddish industry it is only occasionally – something materialises that justifies the endless bullshit that represents its daily diet... the 11 songs that make up Definitely Maybe ... lie shining like so much crystal-cut glass among the debris of the nation's hotel rooms". Writing in Mojo in 1994, Jim Irvin felt the record was "bloody close" to the "punch-yer-lights-out debut they'd intended. Certainly when put next to the flimsy, uncommitted music of most new British bands, Definitely Maybe spits feathers ... Spunky, adolescent rock, vivifying and addictive".

In the US, Rolling Stone included the album in its end-of-year round-up of 1994's most important records, with Paul Evans saying, "Liam Gallagher has God-given cool. And with his brother Noel supplying him with sumptuous rockers, it's easy to see why this quintet is next year's model. Heavier on guitar than Blur or Suede, they're the simpler, catchier outfit." Neil Strauss of The New York Times wrote of the songs; "On its own, each one sounds like a classic, rippling with hard guitar hooks, strong dance beats and memorable choruses."

== Legacy ==
Professional ratings
Retrospective reviews
Review scores
Source	Rating
AllMusic	5/5 stars
Encyclopedia of Popular Music	5/5 stars
Mojo	5/5 stars
Pitchfork	8.8/10
Q	5/5 stars
Record Collector	4/5 stars
Rolling Stone	4.5/5 stars
The Rolling Stone Album Guide	5/5 stars
Spin	4.5/5 stars
Uncut	8/10

Reviewing the 2014 reissue of Definitely Maybe in Mojo, Danny Eccleston stated, "There's nothing more exhilarating than the feeling that something great is about to happen. It's a force that courses, unmanageably, through Oasis' debut album even today... This is transcendental rock'n'roll music that celebrates the moment, not a moment." In his review of the reissue, Rolling Stone critic Rob Sheffield said, "Twenty years on, Oasis' debut album remains one of the most gloriously loutish odes to cigarettes, alcohol, and dumb guitar solos that the British Isles have ever coughed up." The same year, a study of the album by writer Alex Niven was published in Bloomsbury's 33 1/3 series. Niven reviewed the album from a sociopolitical context of Oasis as a working-class answer to four decades of political strife.

In October 2023, Liam Gallagher announced plans to tour and perform Definitely Maybe in full, marking the album's 30th anniversary.

=== Accolades ===
In 1997, Definitely Maybe was named the 14th greatest album of all time in a "Music of the Millennium" poll conducted by HMV, Channel 4, The Guardian, and Classic FM. On Channel 4's "100 Greatest Albums" countdown in 2005, the album was placed at No. 6. In 2006, NME placed the album at No. 3 on its list of the greatest British albums ever, behind the Stone Roses' self-titled debut album and the Smiths' The Queen Is Dead. In a 2006 British poll run by NME and the Guinness Book of British Hit Singles, the album was voted the best album of all time, with the Beatles' Sgt. Pepper's Lonely Hearts Club Band finishing second. Q placed it at No. 5 on its greatest albums of all-time list in 2006, and NME hailed it as the greatest album of all time that same year.

In a 2008 poll conducted by Q and HMV of the greatest British albums of all time, Definitely Maybe placed at No. 1. Rolling Stone ranked the album at No. 217 on its 2020 list of the "500 Greatest Albums of All Time", No. 78 on its 2011 list of the "100 Best Albums of the Nineties", as well as No. 42 on its 2013 list of the "100 Best Debut Albums of All Time". The German edition of Rolling Stone ranked the album at No. 156 on its list of "The 500 Greatest Albums of All Time".

In 2000, the album was voted No. 44 in Colin Larkin's All Time Top 1000 Albums. In July 2014, Guitar World ranked Definitely Maybe at No. 19 on its list of "50 Iconic Albums That Defined 1994". The album was ranked at No. 160 on Spin's "300 Best Albums of the Past 30 Years (1985–2014)" list. In 2017, Pitchfork listed the album at No. 9 on its list of the "50 Best Britpop Albums". On the other hand, it was ranked at No. 4 on the list of most overrated albums ever in a 2005 BBC public poll. The album was also included in the book 1001 Albums You Must Hear Before You Die.

== Track listing ==
All tracks are written by Noel Gallagher.

Definitely Maybe track listing
No.	Title	Length
1.	"Rock 'n' Roll Star"	5:23
2.	"Shakermaker"	5:08
3.	"Live Forever"	4:36
4.	"Up in the Sky"	4:28
5.	"Columbia"	6:17
6.	"Supersonic"	4:43
7.	"Bring It On Down"	4:17
8.	"Cigarettes & Alcohol"	4:49
9.	"Digsy's Dinner" ( (Note: On the North American release, the title of this song is misspelled as "Digsy's Diner".))	2:32
10.	"Slide Away"	6:32
11.	"Married with Children"	3:11
Total length:		51:56

Bonus tracks

Songs not included on most releases
No.	Title	Length
4.	"Cloudburst" (Japanese edition only)	5:22
6.	"Sad Song" (Japanese edition only)	4:27
12.	"Whatever" (Mexican edition only)	6:22

Japanese 2014 Deluxe Edition bonus tracks
No.	Title	Length
12.	"Shakermaker" (Slide Up mix)	5:36
13.	"Bring It On Down" (Monnow Valley version)	4:23
Total length:		1:01:59

=== Vinyl version ===
All tracks are written by Noel Gallagher.

Side one
No.	Title	Length
1.	"Rock 'n' Roll Star"	5:23
2.	"Shakermaker"	5:08
3.	"Live Forever"	4:36
Total length:		15:07

Side two
No.	Title	Length
1.	"Up in the Sky"	4:28
2.	"Columbia"	6:17
3.	"Sad Song"	4:30
Total length:		15:15

Side three
No.	Title	Length
1.	"Supersonic"	4:43
2.	"Bring It On Down"	4:17
3.	"Cigarettes & Alcohol"	4:49
Total length:		13:49

Side four
No.	Title	Length
1.	"Digsy's Dinner"	2:32
2.	"Slide Away"	6:32
3.	"Married with Children"	3:15
Total length:		12:19

=== Singles box set ===
Definitely Maybe

Box set by Oasis
- Released: 4 November 1996
- Recorded: 1993–1994
- Genres: Britpop, rock
- Length: 87:38
- Label: Creation
- Producers: Oasis, Mark Coyle, Owen Morris, Dave Batchelor

Oasis chronology
Definitely Maybe (1996)	(What's the Story) Morning Glory? (1996)

The Definitely Maybe box set was released on 4 November 1996, featuring four discs of singles, including B-sides, and one disc of interviews. The set charted at number 23 on the UK Albums Chart.

All songs written by Noel Gallagher, except "I Am the Walrus" by Lennon–McCartney.

Disc one
No.	Title	Length
1.	"Interviews"	18:22
Total length:		18:22

Disc two
No.	Title	Length
1.	"Supersonic"	4:44
2.	"Take Me Away"	4:30
3.	"I Will Believe" (Live)	3:46
4.	"Columbia" (White label demo)	5:25
Total length:		18:23

Disc three
No.	Title	Length
1.	"Shakermaker"	5:08
2.	"D'Yer Wanna Be a Spaceman?"	2:41
3.	"Alive" (8-track demo)	3:56
4.	"Bring It On Down" (Live)	4:17
Total length:		16:02

Disc four
No.	Title	Length
1.	"Live Forever"	4:36
2.	"Up in the Sky" (Acoustic version)	3:32
3.	"Cloudburst"	5:21
4.	"Supersonic" (Live)	5:12
Total length:		18:41

Disc five
No.	Title	Length
1.	"Cigarettes & Alcohol"	4:49
2.	"I Am the Walrus" (Live)	8:15
3.	"Listen Up"	6:39
4.	"Fade Away"	4:13
Total length:		23:54

=== 2014: 20th anniversary reissue ===
To mark the 20th anniversary of the original release and as part of a promotional campaign entitled Chasing the Sun, the album was released on 19 May 2014, a deluxe edition featured the remastered original album packaged with two additional discs of material. Additionally, a limited edition reproduction of the band's original 1993 demo cassette was also made available to purchase.

2014 reissue disc 2: B-Sides
No.	Title	Original single	Length
1.	"Columbia" (White Label Demo)	"Supersonic" (1994)	5:29
2.	"Cigarettes & Alcohol" (Demo)	Previously unreleased	4:38
3.	"Sad Song"	Previously unreleased	4:30
4.	"I Will Believe" (Live)	"Supersonic"	3:49
5.	"Take Me Away"	"Supersonic"	4:33
6.	"Alive" (Demo)	"Shakermaker" (1994)	3:59
7.	"D'Yer Wanna Be a Spaceman?"	"Shakermaker"	2:42
8.	"Supersonic" (Live)	"Live Forever" (1994)	5:16
9.	"Up in the Sky" (Acoustic Version)	"Live Forever"	3:35
10.	"Cloudburst"	"Live Forever"	5:24
11.	"Fade Away"	"Cigarettes & Alcohol" (1994)	4:16
12.	"Listen Up"	"Cigarettes & Alcohol"	6:43
13.	"I Am the Walrus" (Live at the Glasgow Cathouse. Glasgow, Scotland, June 1994)	"Cigarettes & Alcohol"	8:19
14.	"Whatever"	"Whatever" (1994)	6:23
15.	"(It's Good) to Be Free"	"Whatever"	4:24
16.	"Half the World Away"	"Whatever"	4:22
Total length:			1:18:22

2014 reissue disc 3: Rare Tracks
No.	Title	Length
1.	"Supersonic" (Live at Glasgow Tramshed, Glasgow, Scotland, 7 April 1994)	5:32
2.	"Rock 'n' Roll Star" (Demo)	5:47
3.	"Shakermaker" (Live Paris In-Store Performance)	4:06
4.	"Columbia" (Eden Studios Mix)	5:38
5.	"Cloudburst" (Demo)	5:11
6.	"Strange Thing" (Demo)	5:15
7.	"Live Forever" (Live Paris In-Store Performance)	4:43
8.	"Cigarettes & Alcohol" (Live at Manchester Academy, Manchester, England, 18 December 1994)	3:59
9.	"D'Yer Wanna Be a Spaceman?" (Live at Manchester Academy, Manchester, England, 18 December 1994)	2:47
10.	"Fade Away" (Demo)	4:24
11.	"Take Me Away" (Live at Manchester Academy, Manchester, England, 18 December 1994)	4:16
12.	"Sad Song" (Live at Manchester Academy, Manchester, England, 18 December 1994)	4:30
13.	"Half the World Away" (Live at Tokyo Hotel Room)	3:54
14.	"Digsy's Dinner" (Live Paris In-Store Performance)	2:37
15.	"Married with Children" (Demo)	3:17
16.	"Up in the Sky" (Live Paris In-Store Performance)	3:20
17.	"Whatever" (Strings only)	4:54
Total length:		1:14:10

2014 reissue additional download only tracks
No.	Title	Length
1.	"Live Forever" (Live Gleneagles March ‘94)	4:26
2.	"Digsy's Dinner" (Live Gleneagles March ‘94)	2:24
Total length:		6:50

=== 2024: 30th anniversary reissue ===
To mark the 30th anniversary of the original release, the album was reissued on 30th August 2024. The reissue includes the remastered original album packaged with one additional disc containing the previously discarded original recording session from Monnow Valley along with outtakes from Sawmills Studios and a demo of Sad Song (with Liam Gallagher on vocals).

2024 reissue disc 2
No.	Title	Length
1.	"Rock 'n' Roll Star" (Monnow Valley Version)	6:17
2.	"Shakermaker" (Monnow Valley Version)	4:50
3.	"Live Forever" (Monnow Valley Version)	4:55
4.	"Up In The Sky" (Monnow Valley Version)	4:57
5.	"Columbia" (Monnow Valley Version)	4:50
6.	"Bring It On Down" (Monnow Valley Version)	4:00
7.	"Cigarettes & Alcohol" (Monnow Valley Version)	4:27
8.	"Digsy's Dinner" (Monnow Valley Version)	2:40
9.	"Rock 'n' Roll Star" (Sawmills Outtake)	6:32
10.	"Up In The Sky" (Sawmills Outtake)	4:32
11.	"Columbia" (Sawmills Outtake)	7:17
12.	"Bring It On Down" (Sawmills Outtake)	4:22
13.	"Cigarettes & Alcohol" (Sawmills Outtake)	5:06
14.	"Digsy's Dinner" (Sawmills Outtake)	3:03
15.	"Slide Away" (Sawmills Outtake)	6:03
16.	"Sad Song" (Mauldeth Road West Demo, Nov’ 92)	4:34
Total length:		1:18:25

== DVD ==
Definitely Maybe was released on DVD in September 2004 to mark the tenth anniversary of its original release. It went triple platinum in the UK. The DVD featured an hour-long documentary about the recording of the album featuring interviews with the band and its associates. Also included was the album in its entirety, at 48 kHz, including a remix of "Sad Song" with double tracked vocals during the chorus. "Sad Song" originally only appeared on the UK vinyl and Japanese CD versions of the album, as well as on a French bonus CD included with copies of the album sold at FNAC stores. Other content included live and TV performances of the album's twelve tracks, and the promo videos to "Supersonic" (UK & US versions), "Shakermaker", "Live Forever" (UK & US versions), "Cigarettes & Alcohol" and "Rock 'n' Roll Star". A limited-edition release in the UK and Ireland included a bonus DVD containing more live footage and anecdotes.

There was also an accompanying made-for-TV documentary, entitled There We Were, Now Here We Are ... : The Making Of Oasis. This was broadcast on Channel 4 in the UK at 11:30 pm on Friday, 3 September, three days before the release of the Definitely Maybe DVD. The programme combined existing and unused interview footage from the DVD documentary and focused on the origins of the band, and the four singles from Definitely Maybe. It also included a clip of "All Around the World" performed live at a rehearsal session in the Boardwalk in 1992, five years before it was eventually recorded and released on Be Here Now. The DVD received the NME award for Best Music DVD. The DVD earned Gold status in Australia.

Live versions
No.	Title	Music	Date	Length
1.	"Rock 'n' Roll Star"	Top of the Pops	8 September 1994
2.	"Shakermaker"	Naked City, Las Vegas, Nevada	7 June 1994
3.	"Live Forever"	Glastonbury Festival, Pilton, Somerset, England	26 June 1994
4.	"Up in the Sky"	Metro Chicago, Chicago, Illinois	15 October 1994
5.	"Columbia"	Hammersmith Palais, Hammersmith, London, England	13 December 1994
6.	"Supersonic"	The Word	18 March 1994
7.	"Bring It On Down"	Gleneagles, Scotland	6 February 1994
8.	"Cigarettes & Alcohol"	Southampton Guildhall, Southampton, England	30 November 1994
9.	"Digsy's Dinner"	Buckley Tivoli, Flintshire, Wales	31 August 1994
10.	"Slide Away"	Wetlands Preserve, New York City	21 July 1994
11.	"Married with Children"	Whisky a Go Go, Los Angeles, California	29 September 1994
12.	"Sad Song"	Later... with Jools Holland	10 December 1994

== Personnel ==
Oasis

- Liam Gallagher – vocals, tambourine
- Noel Gallagher – lead guitar, backing vocals, bass guitar on "Up in the Sky" and "Slide Away"
- Paul "Bonehead" Arthurs – rhythm guitar, piano on "Live Forever" and "Digsy's Dinner"
- Paul "Guigsy" McGuigan – bass guitar
- Tony McCarroll – drums

Additional personnel

- Anthony Griffiths – backing vocals on "Supersonic"
- Mark Coyle – production (all except "Slide Away"), mixing on "Supersonic" and "Married with Children", engineering
- Oasis – production (all except "Slide Away")
- Owen Morris – additional production, mixing
- Barry Grint – mastering at Abbey Road Studios, London
- David Batchelor – production on "Slide Away"
- Anjali Dutt – engineering
- Dave Scott – engineering, mixing
- Roy Spong – engineering
- Brian Cannon for Microdot – sleeve concept, design, art direction
- Michael Spencer Jones – photography

== Charts ==
=== Weekly charts ===
Chart (1994–97)	Peak position
Australian Albums (ARIA)	23
Austrian Albums (Ö3 Austria)	27
Belgian Albums (Ultratop Wallonia)	44
Dutch Albums (Album Top 100)	55
Europe (European Top 100 Albums)	10
Finnish Albums (Suomen virallinen lista)	18
French Albums (SNEP)	20
German Albums (Offizielle Top 100)	33
Icelandic Albums (Tónlist)	15
Irish Albums (IRMA)	3
Japanese Albums (Oricon)	34
New Zealand Albums (RMNZ)	5
Norwegian Albums (VG-lista)	34
Swedish Albums (Sverigetopplistan)	4
Swiss Albums (Schweizer Hitparade)	25
UK Albums (Official Charts)	1
UK Independent Albums (Music Week)	1
US Billboard 200	58
US Heatseekers Albums (Billboard)	1
US Albums (Cash Box)	61

Chart (2014–19)	Peak position
German Albums (Offizielle Top 100)	26
Italian Albums (FIMI)	18
Scottish Albums (Official Charts)	3
Spanish Albums (Promusicae)	23

Chart (2024)	Peak position
Australian Albums (ARIA)	10
Austrian Albums (Ö3 Austria)	7
Belgian Albums (Ultratop Flanders)	5
Belgian Albums (Ultratop Wallonia)	9
Danish Albums (Hitlisten)	20
Dutch Albums (Album Top 100)	12
German Albums (Offizielle Top 100)	5
Greek Albums (IFPI)	27
Italian Albums (FIMI)	8
Scottish Albums (Official Charts)	1
Spanish Albums (Promusicae)	14
Swedish Albums (Sverigetopplistan)	17
Swiss Albums (Schweizer Hitparade)	7
UK Albums (Official Charts)	1
US Top Alternative Albums (Billboard)	18

=== Year-end charts ===
Chart (1994)	Position
UK Albums (OCC)	21

Chart (1995)	Position
Belgian Albums (Ultratop Wallonia)	87
European Top 100 Albums (Music & Media)	39
UK Albums (OCC)	18

Chart (1996)	Position
New Zealand Albums (RMNZ)	47
UK Albums (OCC)	22

Chart (1997)	Position
UK Albums (OCC)	93

Chart (2005)	Position
UK Albums (OCC)	184

Chart (2020)	Position
UK Albums (OCC)	67

Chart (2021)	Position
UK Albums (OCC)	86

Chart (2022)	Position
UK Albums (OCC)	75

Chart (2023)	Position
UK Albums (OCC)	57

Chart (2024)	Position
UK Albums (OCC)	20

Chart (2025)	Position
UK Albums (OCC)	24

== Certifications ==
=== Definitely Maybe ===
Region	Certification	Certified units/sales
Australia (ARIA)	2× Platinum	140,000^{‡}
Brazil (Pro-Música Brasil)	Gold	100,000^{‡}
Canada (Music Canada)	Platinum	100,000^{^}
France (SNEP)	2× Gold	200,000^{*}
Italy (FIMI) sales since 2009	Platinum	50,000^{‡}
Japan (RIAJ)	Platinum	200,000^{^}
New Zealand (RMNZ)	Platinum	15,000^{^}
Sweden (GLF)	Gold	50,000^{^}
Switzerland (IFPI Switzerland)	Gold	25,000^{^}
United Kingdom (BPI)	10× Platinum	3,000,000^{‡}
United States (RIAA)	Platinum	1,000,000^{^}
Summaries
Europe (IFPI)	2× Platinum	2,000,000^{*}
^{*} Sales figures based on certification alone.^{^} Shipments figures based on certification alone.^{‡} Sales+streaming figures based on certification alone.

=== Definitely Maybe DVD ===
Region	Certification	Certified units/sales
Australia (ARIA)	Gold	7,500^{^}
United Kingdom (BPI)	3× Platinum	150,000^{^}
^{^} Shipments figures based on certification alone.

== Sources ==
- Harris, John (2004). Britpop!: Cool Britannia and the Spectacular Demise of English Rock. Da Capo Press. ISBN 0-306-81367-X.
