= Cigarettes & Alcohol =

1994 single by Oasis

Single by Oasis

from the album Definitely Maybe
- B-side: "I Am the Walrus" (live); "Listen Up"; "Fade Away"
- Released: 10 October 1994
- Studio: Clear (Manchester, England)
- Genre: Rock; Britpop; blues rock; glam rock
- Length: 4:48
- Label: Creation
- Songwriter: Noel Gallagher
- Producers: Oasis; Mark Coyle; Owen Morris

Oasis singles chronology
"Live Forever" (1994)	"Cigarettes & Alcohol" (1994)	"Whatever" (1994)

Definitely Maybe track listing
- 11 tracks: 1. "Rock 'n' Roll Star"; 2. "Shakermaker"; 3. "Live Forever"; 4. "Up in the Sky"; 5. "Columbia"; 6. "Supersonic"; 7. "Bring It on Down"; 8. "Cigarettes & Alcohol"; 9. "Digsy's Dinner"; 10. "Slide Away"; 11. "Married with Children"

Music video
- "Cigarettes & Alcohol" on YouTube

"Cigarettes & Alcohol" is a song by the English rock band Oasis, written by Noel Gallagher. It was released on 10 October 1994 by Creation Records as the fourth single from their debut album, Definitely Maybe (1994), and their second to enter the UK top ten in the United Kingdom, peaking at number seven, and ultimately spending 82 weeks on the UK Top 100 between 1994 and 1998. On 7 November 2025, 31 years after its release, the song was certified double platinum, indicating 1,200,000 sales.

== Background ==
Whereas the band's first two singles "Supersonic" and "Shakermaker" had used psychedelic imagery, and the third single "Live Forever" used softer chords and tender lyrics, "Cigarettes & Alcohol" demonstrated the rougher musical attitude that Oasis appeared to be promoting. The song proclaims the inherent appeal of cigarettes, alcohol, and other drugs as a remedy to the banality and seemingly futile nature of working-class life. The line "Is it worth the aggravation to find yourself a job when there's nothing worth working for?" taps into a sentiment of disenchantment common in the 1990s. Alan McGee, who discovered the band, boisterously claimed upon first hearing the song that it was "one of the greatest social statements of the past 25 years".

Commentators have long noted that the song’s central guitar figure closely resembles T. Rex’s “Get It On (Bang a Gong)”, with the track drawing on glam-rock sonics; Music & Media flagged the band “go[ing] T-Rex” on release, and later critics have repeated the comparison.

== Critical reception ==
Upon the release, pan-European magazine Music & Media wrote, "Self-proclaimed best band in the world goes T-Rex to underline the big ego statement. The fags and booze archetype R&R lyrics make them as much an attitude band as Primal Scream." Leesa Daniels from Smash Hits gave it a full score of five out of five and named it Best New Single, saying that "it's a monster of a track: with cock-sure vocals over heavy guitars and drums. Everyone in Britain should go out and buy a copy of it!"

== Musical style ==
In a 2014 book on the album entitled Oasis' Definitely Maybe, Alex Niven typified "Cigarettes & Alcohol" as a "twelve-bar blues rock song" and "a classicist boiling-down of the Rolling Stones' rebel rock archetype".

== B-sides ==
The CD release of the "Cigarettes & Alcohol" single includes three B-sides: a cover version of "I Am the Walrus", "Listen Up" and "Fade Away". These three songs were later included on The Masterplan, a compilation of B-sides. An acoustic version of "Fade Away" was released on The Help Album, a charity record, and subsequently on the band's later single "Don't Go Away".

Contrary to the track listing and clarified on subsequent releases (including The Masterplan), "I Am the Walrus" was actually not recorded at the Glasgow Cathouse, but at the Gleneagles Hotel during a conference for Sony music executives, who gathered to hear Creation Records' newly signed artists. The song was recorded during soundcheck, in an empty hall, with no audience, at 10 in the morning. Noel Gallagher stated that the band loved this particular live recording, but strongly disliked the event, which Noel described as "one of them shit things where all the twats in suits get together and they roll on the new signings". The band actually did perform the song at the Cathouse in June 1994 during their Definitely Maybe Tour and had a recording of it, "which sounded quite similar but it was fucking rubbish", according to Noel. They then decided to use the recording from the Gleneagles soundcheck, but credited it as stemming from the Cathouse, adding crowd noise taken from a Faces bootleg album to make it sound like an authentic tour recording. "Because it would look shit if you put 'Live at Sony Seminar in Gleneagles'!", Noel stated. "[W]e thought, 'Fuck it, no-one'll fucking know'. But I always meant to set the record straight one day. Sorry to anyone who bought it on the premise of being at that gig."

== Track listings ==
- Standard CD single
1. "Cigarettes & Alcohol" – 4:48
2. "I Am the Walrus" (live at Glasgow Cathouse, June '94) – 8:15^{[a]}
3. "Listen Up" – 6:39
4. "Fade Away" – 4:13
- 7-inch, cassette, and European CD single
1. "Cigarettes & Alcohol" – 4:48
2. "I Am the Walrus" (live at Glasgow Cathouse, June '94) – 8:15^{[a]}
- 12-inch single

A1. "Cigarettes & Alcohol" – 4:48
B1. "I Am the Walrus" (live at Glasgow Cathouse, June '94) – 8:15^{[a]}
B2. "Fade Away" – 4:13

^{[a]} The song was actually recorded at the Gleneagles Hotel with no audience and has added crowd noise; see "B-sides" paragraph above.

== Personnel ==
Oasis

- Liam Gallagher – vocals, tambourine
- Noel Gallagher – lead guitar
- Paul Arthurs – rhythm guitar
- Paul McGuigan – bass guitar
- Tony McCarroll – drums

Additional personnel

- Mark Coyle – production, engineering
- Oasis – production
- Owen Morris – additional production, mixing
- Barry Grint – mastering at Abbey Road Studios, London
- Anjali Dutt – engineering
- Dave Scott – engineering, mixing
- Roy Spong – engineering

== Charts ==
=== Weekly charts ===
Chart (1994–1996)	Peak position
Europe (Eurochart Hot 100)	30
Ireland (IRMA)	15
Israel (IBA)	40
Scottish Singles Sales (Official Charts)	5
UK Singles (Official Charts)	7
UK Airplay (Music Week)	27

=== Year-end charts ===
Chart (1994)	Position
UK Singles (OCC)	151

== Certifications ==
Region	Certification	Certified units/sales
United Kingdom (BPI)	2× Platinum	1,200,000^{‡}
^{‡} Sales+streaming figures based on certification alone.

== Covers ==
"Cigarettes & Alcohol" was covered by Rod Stewart for his 1998 album When We Were the New Boys, on which it is the opening track as "Cigarettes and Alcohol". His version was a hit on US mainstream rock radio, peaking at number 13 on the Billboard Mainstream Rock Tracks chart and ending 1998 as the chart's 54th-most-successful track. The song was also performed by the Royal Philharmonic Orchestra on Plays the Music of Oasis, which is part of a series of albums with orchestral interpretations of pop music.
