= Supersonic (Oasis song) =

1994 single by Oasis

Single by Oasis

from the album Definitely Maybe
- B-side: "Take Me Away"; "I Will Believe" (live); "Columbia" (demo)
- Released: 5 April 1994
- Recorded: 19 December 1993
- Studio: Pink Museum (Liverpool)
- Genre: Rock; Britpop; hard rock; alternative rock
- Length: 4:43 (album version); 3:40 (radio edit); 5:09 (Knebworth version)
- Label: Creation
- Songwriter: Noel Gallagher
- Producers: Oasis; Mark Coyle

Oasis singles chronology
| "Supersonic" (1994) | "Shakermaker" (1994) |

Definitely Maybe track listing
- 11 tracks: 1. "Rock 'n' Roll Star"; 2. "Shakermaker"; 3. "Live Forever"; 4. "Up in the Sky"; 5. "Columbia"; 6. "Supersonic"; 7. "Bring It on Down"; 8. "Cigarettes & Alcohol"; 9. "Digsy's Dinner"; 10. "Slide Away"; 11. "Married with Children"

Music videos
- "Supersonic" (UK version) on YouTube
- "Supersonic" (US version) on YouTube

"Supersonic" is a song by English rock band Oasis. It was released as their debut single in Ireland on 5 April 1994 and in the United Kingdom on 11 April. It later appeared on their debut studio album, Definitely Maybe (1994). The song was produced by the band and Mark Coyle, their live sound engineer. The single was accompanied by two music videos, one directed by Mark Szaszy and the other by Nick Egan.

"Supersonic" was written by lead guitarist Noel Gallagher and recorded in a single day at the Pink Museum Studio (now the Motor Museum) in Liverpool in mid-December 1993. Despite being technically a demo, it was never re-recorded, and it features Beatles-influenced backing vocals from Tony Griffiths of the band the Real People. According to tour DJ Phil Smith, the song only cost £100 to produce.

"Supersonic" reached number 31 on the UK Singles Chart, number two on the UK Independent Singles Chart, as well as becoming Oasis' first single to chart in the US. It also charted in the top 30 in Ireland and New Zealand, as well as the top 40 in Scotland and France. In 2024, the song was certified double platinum by the British Phonographic Industry (BPI).

== Writing ==
"Supersonic" was written and recorded in a single day at the Pink Museum Studio in Liverpool, on 19 December 1993. It was produced by Oasis with their live sound engineer, Mark Coyle. Guitarist Noel Gallagher claimed he wrote the song in half an hour, (Note: Noel later admitted in a 2008 interview that he wrote "Supersonic" in ten minutes while high on drugs, so with the Oasis first three albums: Definitely Maybe (1994), (What's the Story) Morning Glory? (1995) and Be Here Now (1997).) while his studio colleagues were taking a break from recording to eat a Chinese takeaway. Rather than joining them, Noel remained in the studio backroom working on his guitar riff and finished writing before they returned. Guitarist Paul "Bonehead" Arthurs recalled:

Noel's just sat there with the guitar and he just wrote the music, that will do, and then he wrote the words, any old fucking words and he came back in the room with us, with his guitar and he said, 'Look, I've just written another song.' He started singing it and we nailed it and mixed it that night, rapid, because that's what we'd been doing every night in the Boardwalk, you know, and it sounded massive, absolutely massive.

According to Noel, "Supersonic" was the only Oasis single written in the studio after another song, "Bring It on Down", was discarded.

Additionally, drummer Tony McCarroll wrote in his 2010 book The Truth: "Now, I know that Noel is the main songwriter for Oasis, but there were many instances like this where the band as a whole – and The Real People too – were integral to the composition of a song." (Note: For details, see Recording section.) McCarroll also recounted that Noel did not want to credit brothers Chris and Tony Griffiths of the Real People as co-producers of "Supersonic" or feature the band itself as a guest act on any future Oasis performance, leading to a verbal altercation between Noel and singer Liam Gallagher as well as constant problems with the rest of the band members.

== Recording ==
Following a short local tour with the Verve, Oasis performed at the Krazy House club in Liverpool, supporting the Real People, on 16 December 1993. After the gig, they booked sessions at the Pink Museum with Coyle and engineer Dave Scott for a few days, (Note: The Pink Museum founder, Hambi Haralambous, recalled that Oasis booked the studio for four days, Tony Griffiths and Noel said three days, while Dave Scott stating in an interview that they booked for only two days, Saturday and Sunday; Mark Coyle also confirmed that the sessions took two days.) funded by £300 per day, to record "Bring It on Down" for release as their then-upcoming debut single, at the request of Creation Records owner Alan McGee. However, according to Noel, the intended song recording was abandoned due to a disagreement over McCarroll's drumming. He said: "It would become apparent that session didn't work because our drummer at the time wasn't the most consistent from one fucking bar to the next, never mind one day to the next."

According to Scott, Oasis attempted to record a studio version for "I Will Believe", but he dismissed the result because it sounded like an early 1980s indie pop song. Scott later described the unreleased version as a "shoe-gazer shit". Instead, after unsuccessful attempts to record "I Will Believe", Noel wrote a new song, "Take Me Away", in less than five minutes, and recorded it acoustically in 15 minutes. Noel played an Epiphone acoustic guitar with a half-pint glass, creating a slide guitar sound that Coyle overdubbed through a Roland Space Echo before Scott mixing the track in another five minutes.

On the last day of the sessions after recording "Take Me Away", Oasis began jamming together, attempting to work on an instrumental they had played as a warm-up during the session of "Bring It on Down" and which would become "Supersonic". The jam session began with McCarroll playing a "lazy" drumbeat, which was quickly followed by Bonehead playing rhythm guitar and Liam rattling his tambourine over the beat. Noel soon joined them and played a guitar melody over the rhythm. Meanwhile, Scott asked the Griffiths brothers, who were present at the sessions, to give Oasis musical and technical advice. Instead of recording B-side songs, Tony Griffiths suggested them to develop their jam as it had the potential of a hit single.

After Tony's suggestion, Noel went to the corner and quickly wrote down the lyrics, and then Oasis began recording "Supersonic". To record the song, Scott had to remove a take of "I Will Believe" because he did not have a spare tape. Bonehead used a Gibson SG guitar owned by Scott and a Marshall JCM900 amplifier owned by Chris Griffiths. Noel played an Epiphone Les Paul guitar through a Watkins Dominator MKIII combo amp. For Noel's lead guitar, Scott added additional overdubs by placing the amp in the studio's stone room with close-and-distance microphones and slightly speeding up the tape to thicken the guitar tone over the track. Scott removed McCarroll's hi-hats (Note: The hi-hats are still audioable, but played loosely throughout the song.) to record the tambourine track.

After recording the backing tracks, Liam recorded his vocals in one single take, with Noel guiding him (Note: Contrary to this, McCarroll said that the guide vocals for Liam were done by Tony Griffiths.) and Scott using a Lexicon PCM70 reverb and TC-2290 delay on the vocals. Tony contributed five layers of backing vocals to the song, influenced by the Beatles' backing vocal style. According to Scott, "Supersonic" was recorded and mixed in 11 hours, while Noel said it took eight hours to be completed. (Note: In a 2023 interview on BBC Radio Manchester, Noel amended his account that the recording of the song–including writing and mixing time–took six hours.) Although it was originally based as a demo, it was never re-recorded, and this refers to producer Owen Morris, who later reworked on some other tracks on Definitely Maybe prior to its release. After the recording was finished, the song was introduced to McGee as a potential alternate single; he was impressed. According to tour DJ Phil Smith, "Supersonic" alone cost £100 to produce.

== Composition ==
=== Music ===
"Supersonic" has been classified as a rock, Britpop, hard rock, and alternative rock song, with elements of neo-psychedelia and American grunge music. It contains Blur-like vocals, "brief but smashing" guitar riffs and "catchy melodic" chorus. Along with the Definitely Maybe song "Live Forever", the basic rock rhythm of "Supersonic" is reminiscent of early 1970s music. The song's cascading guitars are influenced by the Sex Pistols' 1977 song "Pretty Vacant", and also draw influences from bands such as the Who, the Rolling Stones, the Beatles, and the Stone Roses.

The song is played in the key of F♯ minor in a 4/4 time signature with a tempo of 104 beats per minute (BPM), while Liam's vocals span a range of E^{3} to F♯^{4}. The chord progression follows a sequence of F♯m^{11}–A^{sus2}–B^{7}. As with "Bring It on Down", the power chord sequence of "Supersonic" is heavily influenced by Nirvana's Nevermind; (Note: In an interview, Noel described Nevermind as one of the greatest albums that still sound like "the future of rock".) according to author Alex Niven, Noel adapted Kurt Cobain's guitar technique (specifically in the Nevermind hits "Smells Like Teen Spirit" and "Come as You Are") by adding phaser effects for his overdubbed lead guitar to produce a "swirling, underwater" guitar sound.

"Supersonic" begins with a simple drumbeat played by McCarroll, followed by an arpeggiated guitar riff played by Noel. During the intro, Noel produces a pick scrape guitar effect; Scott suggested this technique after he "wasn't too happy" with the drum solo intro. According to Scott, he wanted it to sound like the intro to Peter Gabriel's 1980 song "Intruder", but Noel ended up producing a sound that was "slightly different and quicker". Noel's guitar solo has a striking resemblance to the opening riff of "My Sweet Lord" by George Harrison, with a slightly different guitar harmony. However, Noel has denied deliberately copying it.

=== Lyrics ===
I describe it as the "I Am The Walrus" of the '90s. If you listen to "I Am The Walrus," [it's] a big '60s psychedelic mind-fuck of a single. If you listen to "Supersonic," it's round about the same, but it's in 1994 as opposed to 1967. It's a rock song with off-the-wall lyrics. I've written songs that I didn't know what they meant when I was writing them and have become apparent because they've been about a subject in the first place.

— Noel Gallagher on "Supersonic"

The lyrics are often regarded as a distillation of "lumpen" nonsense poetry, with "forced" doggerel rhymes and "half-baked" allusions in multiple lines throughout the song, such as "I'm feeling supersonic / Give me gin and tonic", "He lives under a waterfall / Nobody can ever hear him call", "I know a girl called Elsa / She's into Alka-Seltzer", "And she makes me laugh / I got her autograph", "She done it with a doctor, on a helicopter" and "She's sniffing in a tissue, selling the Big Issue".

The lyrics are "simplistic" and exhort self-confidence, particularly in the opening lines: "I need to be myself / I can't be no-one else". Arun Starkey of Far Out described "Supersonic" as "a triumphant call to arms for those wanting self-determination." Like the Definitely Maybe song "Cigarettes & Alcohol", "Supersonic" has an alcoholism-themed lyric: "Give me gin and tonic"; this line was written after Scott passed Noel a gin and tonic drink for stimulation instead of whiskey or beer, which were giving Noel a headache. The song mentions various vehicles, including cars, submarines, trains and helicopters. It also saw the band's first lyrical nod to their idols, the Beatles: "You can sail with me in my yellow submarine", referring to their 1966 song "Yellow Submarine" or their 1968 film of the same name.

Most of the lyrics were inspired by the few days Noel experienced while Oasis were in Liverpool. For example, the line "Can I ride with you in your BMW?" was inspired by Tony Griffiths' car spotted by Noel. According to Noel, the main inspiration for writing "Supersonic" came from Scott's then nine-year-old Rottweiler dog, Elsa, who was suffering from flatulence and hiding under the mixing desk while the band were working in the studio, hence the lyric "I know a girl called Elsa / She's into Alka-Seltzer". Despite this, even after Noel revealed Elsa's identity, some Oasis fan girls with the same name claimed that the song was inspired by them. Some commentators interpreted the song to be about prostitution, but Noel also denied this, explaining: "It's usually lyricists that will tell you that the words are fucking everything. They are not, the words don't mean shit to anybody. It's the melody is what you remember. We all whistle tunes; it's always about the melody, and that's what I do."

== Release and performance ==
"Supersonic" was released as a single in Ireland on 5 April 1994, in the UK on 11 April, in Japan on 14 July, in Australia on 18 July, and in the US on 11 September; Creation Records issued the song in Ireland, the UK and Australia while Epic Records issued it in Japan and the US. It was included as the sixth track on Oasis' debut album Definitely Maybe, released on 29 August 1994. Upon its release, the single received extensive airplay on several independent radio stations in England, as well as late-night shows on BBC Radio 1. It peaked at number 31 on the UK Singles Chart on the week of 23 April 1994, and stayed there for 60 weeks, half of which came following the commercial success of the band's second album, (What's the Story) Morning Glory?. However, "Supersonic" remained the band's lowest-peaking single until 2015, when "Half the World Away" debuted at number 56.

"Supersonic" debuted on the UK Independent Singles Chart at number three on 30 April 1994, behind "Always" by Erasure and "The Most Beautiful Girl in the World" by Prince, respectively. The song was included on the compilation Indie Top 20: Vol. 20, released in the UK on 28 October 1994 on the label Beechwood Music and sponsored by Melody Maker. A year later, on 1 July 1995, it re-entered and peaked the chart at number two, behind "A Girl Like You" by Edwyn Collins. The CD release of "Supersonic" was included on Oasis' box sets Definitely Maybe Singles and Complete Single Collection '94–'05.

"Supersonic" was Oasis' first single to chart in the US; it debuted on the Billboard Modern Rock Tracks chart at number 33 on the issue dated 1 October 1994, and peaked at number 11 on 10 December, staying on the chart for a total of 16 weeks until 14 January 1995, at number 32. By the end of October 1994, "Supersonic" was played 215 times in total on 38 different American radio stations, and it would become the most-played track on the WENZ Cleveland radio station two months later. It also reached number 38 on the Billboard Album Rock Tracks chart on the issue dated 24 December 1994.

"Supersonic" reached number 92 on the European Hot 100 Singles chart on 30 April 1994. It also charted in other countries including Ireland (24), Scotland (35), France (33), New Zealand (28), and Australia (122). In Japan, a CD extended play (EP), Supersonic, was released by Epic Records Japan on 14 July 1994, reaching number 81 on the Oricon Albums Chart. By February 1995, it had sold 25,000 copies following airplay on J-Wave's Pioneer Tokio Hot 100.

A live performance of the song at the Gleneagles Hotel was recorded and released as a B-side on the UK single release of Live Forever. Liam introduces the song with "Thank you. This is the last one. And it's gonna be the single, so go and buy it."

"Supersonic" was reissued in the UK in 2000 through Big Brother Recordings. The song was included on Oasis' greatest hits albums, Stop the Clocks and Time Flies... 1994–2009. On 19 April 2014, "Supersonic" was reissued as a remastered 12-inch single by Big Brother, as part of the 2014 Record Store Day. As of October 2016, "Supersonic" had sold over 240,000 copies, making it the band's 14th biggest-selling single in the UK, even outselling their 2002 number one single "The Hindu Times", and their 2005 number one hits "Lyla" and "The Importance of Being Idle".

On 12 April 2024, "Supersonic" was reissued on CD, as well as a limited edition, numbered and pearl-colored 7-inch vinyl to mark the 30th anniversary of its release. In 2024, Paste and Rolling Stone ranked "Supersonic" number five and number three, respectively, on their lists of the greatest Oasis songs.

At the 2009 Rock en Seine festival, Bloc Party – a band who had feuded with Oasis – announced to the crowd that Oasis had withdrawn from the event, ultimately disbanding. Guitarist Russell Lissack played the opening riff to "Supersonic" to mark the occasion.

During his UFC ring walks, Tom Aspinall walks out using a snippet of "Supersonic".

== Music videos ==
Two music videos were shot for the song. The first was directed by Mark Szaszy and intended for a British audience that features the song in its entirety. The other video was directed by Nick Egan and uses the American radio edit.

The Szaszy video was shot in January 1994 and features the band performing on top of a hotel opposite King's Cross Station, mostly in black and white and interspersed with shots of planes flying through the sky. It was the first music video the band shot. Noel Gallagher later recalled being surprised by the lack of glamour and preparation for the shoot. This began a pattern in which the band refused to take the video making process seriously and in some cases actively sabotaged the making of future videos.

The Egan video was shot in Cabazon, California during the band's first North American Tour and features the Cabazon Dinosaurs. The video features the Gallagher brothers being driven in a car through the surrounding desert landscape. Some of the footage of the band performing was repurposed for the "Some Might Say" music video when Liam refused to participate in that video's shoot.

== Critical reception ==
Larry Flick from Billboard magazine wrote, "Direct from the U.K., this five-man rock outfit is swimming in flattering press. Drown out the abundant hype and tune in the music, which offers humorous lyrics, euro-grunge guitarwork, and Blur-like vocals. Massive? Maybe. Distinctive? Definitely." Pan-European magazine Music & Media said it has the riff out of Neil Young's "Rocking in the Free World".

== Track listings ==
All tracks were written by Noel Gallagher, except "Shakermaker" co-written by Roger Cook, Roger Greenaway, Bill Backer and Billy Davis.

- UK single and European maxi-single (CD)
- Australian single (CD, cassette) (Note: The same tracks are played on both sides of the cassette tape.)
1. "Supersonic" – 4:46
2. "Take Me Away" – 4:34
3. "I Will Believe" (Note: On the Australian release, the I pronoun is dropped from this track's title, making it "Will Believe".) (live) – 3:46
4. "Columbia" (white label demo) – 5:24
- UK single (12-inch) (Note: Track 1 is on side A of the 12-inch vinyl and tracks 2 and 3 are on side B.)
1. "Supersonic" – 4:46
2. "Take Me Away" – 4:34
3. "I Will Believe" (live) – 3:46
- UK single and French jukebox single (7-inch) (Note: Track 1 is on side A of the 7-inch vinyl and track 2 is on side B.)
- European single (CD)
1. "Supersonic" – 4:41
2. "Take Me Away" – 4:29
- Japanese EP (CD)
1. "Supersonic" – 4:42
2. "Shakermaker" – 5:10
3. "Columbia" (white label demo) – 5:26
4. "Alive" (8-track demo) – 3:57
5. "D'Yer Wanna Be a Spaceman?" – 2:41
6. "I Will Believe" (live) – 3:47
- US single (cassette)
1. "Supersonic" – 4:43
2. "Slide Away" – 6:32

=== Cover ===
The Smiths guitarist Johnny Marr lent Noel Gallagher his 1982 Rickenbacker 330 Jetglo during the recording of Definitely Maybe. It appears on the cover of "Supersonic", lying on the floor.

== Personnel ==
Personnel are adapted from the CD single liner notes except where noted.

Oasis

- Liam Gallagher – lead vocals, tambourine
- Noel Gallagher – lead guitar
- Paul Arthurs – rhythm guitar
- Paul McGuigan – bass guitar
- Tony McCarroll – drums

Additional musicians

- Tony Griffiths (credited as Anthony Griffiths) – backing vocals

Technical

- Oasis – production
- Mark Coyle – production
- Dave Scott – engineering, mixing
- Owen Morris – mastering (album version)
- Vlado Meller – mastering (US CD version)
- Ian Cooper – remastering (2014 reissue)

Sleeve cover

- Brian Cannon (Microdot) – sleeve design, art direction
- Michael Spencer Jones – photography

== Charts ==
=== Weekly charts ===
1994–1995 weekly chart performance for "Supersonic"
| Chart (1994–1995) | Peak position |
|---|---|
| Australia (ARIA) | 122 |
| Europe (Eurochart Hot 100) | 92 |
| France (SNEP) | 33 |
| Ireland (IRMA) | 24 |
| Japan (Oricon) | 81 |
| New Zealand (Recorded Music NZ) | 28 |
| Scottish Singles Sales (Official Charts) | 35 |
| UK Singles (Official Charts) | 31 |
| UK Indie (OCC) | 2 |
| US Alternative Airplay (Billboard) | 11 |
| US Mainstream Rock Airplay (Billboard) | 38 |
| US Commercial Alternative Cuts (CMJ) | 7 |
| US Alternative Top 50 (Radio & Records) | 9 |
| US Rock Tracks Top 60 (Radio & Records) | 37 |

2014 weekly chart performance for "Supersonic"
| Chart (2014) | Peak position |
|---|---|
| US Hot Singles Sales (Billboard) | 18 |

2024 weekly chart performance
| Chart (2024) | Peak position |
|---|---|
| UK Singles Downloads (Official Charts) | 72 |

=== Year-end charts ===
1994 year-end chart performance for "Supersonic"
| Chart (1994) | Position |
|---|---|
| US Alternative (Radio & Records) | 62 |

1995 year-end chart performance
| Chart (1995) | Position |
|---|---|
| UK Singles (OCC) | 206 |
| UK Indie (OCC) | 7 |

1996 year-end chart performance
| Chart (1996) | Position |
|---|---|
| UK Singles (OCC) | 189 |

== Certifications ==
Certifications for "Supersonic"
| Region | Certification | Certified units/sales |
|---|---|---|
| Australia (ARIA) | Gold | 35,000^{‡} |
| New Zealand (RMNZ) | Gold | 15,000^{‡} |
| United Kingdom (BPI) Sales since 2005 | 3× Platinum | 1,800,000^{‡} |
^{‡} Sales+streaming figures based on certification alone.

== Cover versions ==
English rock band the Struts released a live cover of the song in 2023.

American rock band Sponge released a cover of the song in 2024.

== Notes and references ==
=== Sources ===
- Henshaw, Lee (1996). Oasis: Revealed. Parragon Book Service Limited. ISBN 0-75251-859-3.
- Gallagher, Paul; Christian, Terry (1996). Brothers from Childhood to Oasis: The Real Story. Virgin Publishing. ISBN 1-85227-671-1.
- Middles, Mick (1996). Oasis: Round Their Way. Independent Music Press. ISBN 1-89-7783-10-8.
- Masterson, Eugene (1996). The Word on the Street: The Unsanctioned Story of Oasis. Mainstream Publishing. ISBN 1-85158-890-6.
- Mathur, Paul (1997) [First published 1996]. Take Me There: Oasis, the Story. New York, US: The Overlook Press. ISBN 0-87951-853-7.
- Hewitt, Paolo (1997). Getting High: The Adventures of Oasis. US: Hyperion Books. ISBN 0-7868-8228-X.
- Krugman, Michael (1997). Oasis: Supersonic Supernova. US: St. Martin's Press. ISBN 0-312-15376-7.
- Rees, Dafydd; Crampton, Luke (1999) [First published 1996]. "Oasis". In Summers, David (ed.). Q Rock Stars Encyclopedia (2nd ed.). Dorling Kindersley. pp. 720–722. ISBN 0-7513-1113-8.
- Crispin, Nick (2007). Harrop, Sam (ed.). The Little Black Songbook: Oasis. Wise Publications. ISBN 978-1-84772-237-9.
- McCarroll, Tony (2011) [First published 2010]. Oasis: The Truth (2nd ed.). John Blake Publishing. ISBN 978-1-84358-499-5.
- Randall, Lucian (2012). Noel Gallagher: The Biography. John Blake Publishing. ISBN 978-1-85782-956-3.
- Niven, Alex (2014). Oasis' Definitely Maybe. 33⅓. Bloomsbury Publishing. ISBN 978-1-62356-423-0.
- Rachel, Daniel (2014). The Art of Noise: Conversations with Great Songwriters. New York, US: St. Martin's Griffin. ISBN 978-1-250-05129-5.
