= Rock 'n' Roll Star =

1994 promotional single by Oasis

Promotional single by Oasis

from the album Definitely Maybe
- Released: 1995
- Recorded: Spring 1994
- Genre: Rock
- Length: 5:23
- Label: Creation
- Songwriter: Noel Gallagher
- Producers: Oasis; Mark Coyle; Owen Morris

Oasis singles chronology
"Whatever" (1994)	"Rock 'n' Roll Star" (1995)	"Some Might Say" (1995)

Definitely Maybe track listing
- 11 tracks: 1. "Rock 'n' Roll Star"; 2. "Shakermaker"; 3. "Live Forever"; 4. "Up in the Sky"; 5. "Columbia"; 6. "Supersonic"; 7. "Bring It on Down"; 8. "Cigarettes & Alcohol"; 9. "Digsy's Dinner"; 10. "Slide Away"; 11. "Married with Children"

Music video
- "Rock 'n' Roll Star" on YouTube

"Rock 'n' Roll Star" is a song by English rock band Oasis. It is the opening track from their debut album, Definitely Maybe (1994). Like the majority of the band's songs from this era, it was written by lead guitarist Noel Gallagher, who said that "Rock 'n' Roll Star" was one of only three songs in which he wanted to say something: "I've pretty much summed up everything I wanted to say in "Rock 'n' Roll Star", "Live Forever" and "Cigarettes & Alcohol", after that I'm repeating myself, but in a different way".

It was released as a radio single in the States, but did not chart in their native Manchester. The song's video, directed by Nigel Dick, consists of clips of the band performing the song from their Live by the Sea gig at Southend-on-Sea, interspersed with clips of them, filming each other, on Southend Pier, in and around the amusement park, 'Adventure Island' then named 'Peter Pan's Playground' and in the bowling alley, which subsequently burnt down.

The song was featured on the band's 2000 live album and DVD, Familiar to Millions; another live version was recorded at a 2 July 2005 concert at the City of Manchester Stadium and released on the band's single "Let There Be Love" in late 2005.

Liam Gallagher performed the song as part of the One Love Manchester charity concert on 4 June 2017 in aid of those affected by the Manchester Arena bombing. He also played the song on the Definitely Maybe Tour 30 in 2024 as the opening song, like the track listing on Definitely Maybe.

The song was also covered by Lancashire rock band Milltown Brothers (with only keyboardist Barney Williams playing).

== Critical reception ==
Steve Baltin from Cash Box picked the song as Pick of the Week, writing, "If any one song from their debut CD, Definitely Maybe, shows why Oasis have received the warm response they have from American audiences, this is the track. Against a wild but infectious backbeat, singer Liam Gallagher captures the fantasy of adolescents everywhere. Yet, this is more than a dream, it's a statement we will make the fantasy come true. With their dazzling updating of the great pop hooks of the '60s, Oasis are well on their way to reaching the stardom they sing about. Look for this one to be a tremendously effective follow-up to “Live Forever” on Modern Rock outlets everywhere, with selected AOR stations realizing the joy of this track as well. This is what pop music should be."

In 2024, Paste and Rolling Stone ranked "Rock 'n' Roll Star" number twelve and number nine, respectively, on their lists of the greatest Oasis songs.

== Personnel ==
Oasis

- Liam Gallagher – lead vocals, tambourine
- Noel Gallagher – lead guitar, backing vocals
- Paul Arthurs – rhythm guitar
- Paul McGuigan – bass
- Tony McCarroll – drums

Additional personnel

- Mark Coyle – production, engineering
- Oasis – production
- Owen Morris – additional production, mixing
- Barry Grint – mastering at Abbey Road Studios, London
- Anjali Dutt – engineering
- Dave Scott – engineering, mixing
- Roy Spong – engineering

== Charts ==
1995 chart performance for "Rock 'n' Roll Star"
Chart (1995)	Peak position
US Alternative Airplay (Billboard)	36

2024–2025 chart performance for "Rock 'n' Roll Star"
Chart (2024–2025)	Peak position
Japan Hot Overseas (Billboard Japan)	15

== Certifications ==
Certifications for "Rock 'n' Roll Star"
Region	Certification	Certified units/sales
United Kingdom (BPI)	Platinum	600,000^{‡}
^{‡} Sales+streaming figures based on certification alone.
