= Live Forever (Oasis song) =

1994 single by Oasis

- Cover art featuring John Lennon's childhood home at 251 Menlove Avenue in Woolton, Liverpool

Single by Oasis

from the album Definitely Maybe
- B-side: "Up in the Sky" (acoustic); "Cloudburst"; "Supersonic" (live)
- Released: 8 August 1994
- Studio: Clear (Manchester, England)
- Genre: Britpop; rock
- Length: 4:36 (album version); 3:43 (radio edit)
- Label: Creation
- Songwriter: Noel Gallagher
- Producers: Oasis; Mark Coyle; Owen Morris

Oasis singles chronology
"Shakermaker" (1994)	"Live Forever" (1994)	"Cigarettes & Alcohol" (1994)

Definitely Maybe track listing
- 11 tracks: 1. "Rock 'n' Roll Star"; 2. "Shakermaker"; 3. "Live Forever"; 4. "Up in the Sky"; 5. "Columbia"; 6. "Supersonic"; 7. "Bring It on Down"; 8. "Cigarettes & Alcohol"; 9. "Digsy's Dinner"; 10. "Slide Away"; 11. "Married with Children"

Audio sample
- file; help

Music video
- "Live Forever" on YouTube

Music video
- "Live Forever" (US version) on YouTube

"Live Forever" is a song by the English rock band Oasis. Written by Noel Gallagher, the song was released as the third single from their debut album Definitely Maybe (1994) on 8 August 1994, by Creation Records, just prior to that album's release. Inspired by the Rolling Stones' "Shine a Light", "Live Forever" features a basic song structure and lyrics with an optimistic outlook that contrasted with the attitude of the grunge bands popular at the time. Two different music videos were produced to accompany it, directed by Carlos Grasso and Nick Egan. The song was the first Oasis single to enter the top ten in the United Kingdom, and garnered critical acclaim. In 2017, lead singer Liam Gallagher declared it his favourite Oasis song. The British Phonographic Industry certified the song triple platinum in July 2024. Upon Oasis' reunion in August 2024, the song reached a new peak of number eight on the UK Singles Chart.

== Background and recording ==
Noel Gallagher began working on "Live Forever" in 1991, while working for a building company in his hometown of Manchester. After his foot was crushed by a pipe in an accident, he was given a less-strenuous job working in the storeroom, allowing him more time to write songs. One night, he was listening to the Rolling Stones' album Exile on Main St.; while playing one of his own chord progressions, Gallagher noted that it sounded good against one of the vocal melodies from the album: "It was the bit from 'Shine a Light' that goes [sings], 'May the good Lord shine a light on you'", Gallagher recalled. Gallagher incorporated the melody, changing the line to "Maybe I don't really want to know". For a period afterwards, that was the only part of the song Gallagher had completed.

Noel Gallagher presented a fully composed "Live Forever" to the band for the first time in early 1993 during rehearsals. According to drummer Tony McCarroll, the band were openly awed by it. The song was later instrumental in helping the band secure their record deal with Creation Records. Reflecting on when he first heard the song, Creation boss Alan McGee recalled, "It was probably the single greatest moment I've ever experienced with them".

The demo version of "Live Forever" begins with an acoustic guitar intro. While recording the album version, the record's producer Owen Morris cut out this intro and replaced it with a drumbeat played by McCarroll. Morris further cut a second section in Gallagher's guitar solo. Gallagher was bemused by Morris' decision, and jokingly asked him through manager Marcus Russell to "not cut it in half again on the final mix". Morris said that the removed part made him think of "Slash in leather keks with a wind machine on the Grand Canyon".

== Composition ==
"Live Forever" is in the key of G major (varispeeded up by less than half a semitone during mixing) and is based on a G–D–Am–C–D chord progression, with the G chord becoming an Em during the pre-chorus, though the key changes to A minor following the last chorus. The vocal melody only consists of a few notes. The simplistic arrangement of the song "meant the song never resolved". Guitarist Paul Arthurs said, "for me that song could keep going."

The song begins with a voice whistling briefly and saying "Oh yeah", followed by a drum beat that plays unaccompanied for a few measures. An intermingling of the main guitar line, piano notes, and Liam Gallagher's vocals then enter. Each verse begins with Liam singing the phrase "Maybe/I don't really wanna know/How your garden grows/'Cause I just wanna fly", and each verse ends with the falsetto refrain. A guitar solo appears after the second refrain of "You and I are gonna live forever". After the third verse and refrain section, Liam Gallagher repeats the line "Gonna live forever!" four times with 'ache in his voice', followed by one final guitar solo.

The song is interpreted to be an ode to Noel and Liam Gallagher's mother Peggy. In general the lyrics of the song stress an optimistic outlook. Noel Gallagher explained that "At the time ... it was written in the middle of grunge and all that, and I remember Nirvana had a tune called 'I Hate Myself and Want to Die', and I was like ... 'Well, I'm not fucking having that.' As much as I fucking like him [Nirvana frontman Kurt Cobain] and all that shit, I'm not having that. I can't have people like that coming over here, on smack, fucking saying that they hate themselves and they wanna die. That's fucking rubbish. Kids don't need to be hearing that nonsense." While Gallagher has stated he did not intend "Live Forever" as a direct retort to Nirvana or their music (being a professed fan of the band), he contrasted the lives of Cobain and his band at that point, saying, "Seems to me that here was a guy who had everything, and was miserable about it. And we had fuck-all, and I still thought that getting up in the morning was the greatest fuckin' thing ever, 'cause you didn't know where you'd end up at night. And we didn't have a pot to piss in, but it was fucking great, man". Gallagher considers the line "We see things they'll never see" the most important line of the song, explaining that old friends tend to laugh at jokes and stories that "no one else gets".

== Release and reception ==
"This ain't a song, Mr Gallagher, It's a meditation, a moan, a mantra – with a grinding, tarmac-digging, mind-cutter of a melody. Know/grows/play/pain/rain/bone all hit the 9th note over changing chords, then I/play/live/die/I/breath/I/believe/you're/me/see all hammer the 6th above, also over shifting guitar harmonies. Every vowel sound is crushed into a nasal drone. Finally, 'ever' hits a 3rd and a 6th over a flattened seventh chord – this could wake the Pharaohs."

— Dominic King on "Live Forever"

"Live Forever" was released in 1994 as the band's third single, less than a month before the release of their debut album, Definitely Maybe. Like the album cover, the picture sleeve for the single was one of several references to the Beatles that Oasis incorporated into their artwork. In the case of "Live Forever", the sleeve image was a photo of John Lennon's childhood home at 251 Menlove Avenue in the Liverpool suburb of Woolton, taken by rock photographer Michael Spencer Jones.

The song had been part of the band's set for longer than a year at that point, and had amassed so many mentions in reviews of the group that, according to Harris, "its release [as a single] had long seemed inevitable." In its review of the single, pan-European magazine Music & Media wrote, "Is it a fata morgana, or is Oasis for real? We've had so many over-hyped British bands now, that we prefer to take a back seat. But then again we haven't heard such good pop since the La's." They also stated that it "deserves" to be labeled "masterpiece". Martin Aston from Music Week gave it four out of five and named it Pick of the Week in the category of Alternative, saying, "'Live Forever' is another example of the Mancunian's crunchy melody, punchy dynamic and air of brazen confidence, except that the track plays at a more measured pace. 'Live Forever' is definitely Top 10 material but has the potential to go higher." NME found the song to be an improvement over Oasis's previous singles, concluding, "Basically, what thus far looked like obnoxious Manc arrogance suddenly looks like sheer effortlessness. A terrific record."

While Oasis' first two singles, "Supersonic" and "Shakermaker", were modestly received, it was "Live Forever" that "got the world's attention". "Live Forever" became Oasis' first top-ten hit, reaching number ten on the UK Singles Chart in 1994. In 1995, the song charted in the United States, reaching number two and number ten on Billboard's Modern Rock Tracks and Album Rock Tracks charts, respectively. Noel Gallagher commented on the praise given to the song: "People said to me after 'Live Forever', 'Where are you gonna go after that?' And I was like, I don't think it's that good. I think it's a fucking good song, but I think I can do better."

"Live Forever" has garnered additional acclaim years after its release. In 2006, "Live Forever" was named the greatest song of all time in a poll released by Q; the song had ranked ninth in a similar Q poll three years prior. In 2007, "Live Forever" placed number one in the NME and XFM poll of the 50 "Greatest Indie Anthems Ever". Pitchfork labelled the song as Oasis' best-ever track and said of the song: "It's an honest, aspirational sentiment just as the photo of John Lennon's childhood home on the single's sleeve is an honest, tasteful exhibition of fandom." The music site went on to praise the song for its 'fearless optimism'. In Radio X's annual Best Of British Poll, it has won 6 times, in 2018, 2021, 2023, 2024, 2025 and in the 2026 Best Of British 500. In 2024, Paste and Rolling Stone ranked "Live Forever" third and second, respectively, on their lists of the greatest Oasis songs.

In November 2023, a cover of the song by Kotomi and Ryan Elder was used in the Rick and Morty episode "That's Amorte".

== Music videos ==
Two music videos were made for "Live Forever" for British and American airplay. The original video, shot on 24 July 1994, was directed by Carlos Grasso and features unusual imagery such as Liam Gallagher sitting on a chair affixed to a wall, and a number of scenes are devoted to the band burying drummer Tony McCarroll alive. Some of the UK version of the promotional video was filmed at the Strawberry Fields memorial, the area of New York City's Central Park dedicated to John Lennon—the single cover features 251 Menlove Avenue, the childhood home of Lennon. The American video, directed by Nick Egan features the band playing in an office with pictures of the musicians Sid Vicious, Kurt Cobain, Jim Morrison, John Lennon, Brian Jones, Jimi Hendrix, and Marc Bolan, and the footballer Bobby Moore on the wall. Both videos are included on the 2004 Definitely Maybe DVD. The British music video now has over 30 million views on YouTube.

== Live performances ==
"Live Forever" is a crowd favourite to play at concerts. In some concerts, most notably Manchester in 1996, a slideshow of famous deceased musicians Oasis admired—such as Elvis Presley, Jimi Hendrix, Bob Marley, and Sid Vicious—would be displayed behind the band, with a picture of John Lennon always at the end of the slideshow. During the early years, Liam Gallagher would personally sing the falsetto part, "You and I, we're gonna live forever." Noel Gallagher eventually picked up the role of singing the falsetto, as "Liam thought it was a bit gay." On 4 June 2017, Liam performed the song with Coldplay frontman Chris Martin and guitarist Jonny Buckland at the One Love Manchester benefit concert for the victims of the Manchester Arena bombing.

In February 2018, Liam performed the song at the 2018 Brit Awards as tribute to the victims of the Manchester Arena attack as Ariana Grande was unable to attend due to illness.

On 26 March 2022, Liam dedicated his performance of "Live Forever" to Foo Fighters drummer Taylor Hawkins, who died a day prior, during a Teenage Cancer Trust fundraiser at the Royal Albert Hall in London.

On 4 July 2025, during Oasis' first show in nearly sixteen years at Principality Stadium, the song was dedicated to Liverpool F.C. forward Diogo Jota who had died in a car crash the day prior, with a photo of his jersey displayed on-screen as the song came to an end. The song was subsequently dedicated to others who had died during the Live '25 Tour, including Ozzy Osbourne, Ricky Hatton, Gary “Mani” Mounfield, and the victims of the Annunciation Catholic Church shooting.

== Track listings ==
All tracks are written by Noel Gallagher. (Note: Except "I Am the Walrus" written by Lennon–McCartney.)

- UK single (CD)
1. "Live Forever" – 4:38
2. "Up in the Sky" (acoustic) – 3:32
3. "Cloudburst" – 5:21
4. "Supersonic" (live April '94) – 5:13
- UK single (12") (Note: The 12 and 7-inch vinyls feature track 1 as the A-side.)
1. "Live Forever" – 4:38
2. "Up in the Sky" (acoustic) – 3:32
3. "Cloudburst" – 5:21
- UK single (cassette, 7-inch) (Note: Same tracks appear on the two sides of the cassette tape.)
1. "Live Forever" – 4:38
2. "Up in the Sky" (acoustic) – 3:32
- European single (CD)
- Australian single (CD, cassette)
1. "Live Forever" (radio edit) – 3:43
2. "Live Forever" – 4:38
3. "Up in the Sky" (acoustic) – 3:32
4. "Cloudburst" – 5:21
5. "Supersonic" (live April '94) – 5:13
- Dutch single (CD)
1. "Live Forever" (radio edit) – 3:43
2. "Up in the Sky" (acoustic) – 3:32

== Personnel ==
Oasis

- Liam Gallagher – vocals, tambourine
- Noel Gallagher – lead and acoustic guitars
- Paul Arthurs – rhythm guitar, piano
- Paul McGuigan – bass guitar
- Tony McCarroll – drums

Additional personnel

- Mark Coyle – production, engineering
- Oasis – production
- Owen Morris – additional production, mixing
- Barry Grint – mastering at Abbey Road Studios, London
- Anjali Dutt – engineering
- Dave Scott – engineering, mixing
- Roy Spong – engineering

== Charts ==
=== Weekly charts ===
Weekly chart performance for "Live Forever"
Chart (1994–1995)	Peak position
Canada Top Singles (RPM)	70
Europe (Eurochart Hot 100)	30
Ireland (IRMA)	17
Israel (IBA)	37
Netherlands (Dutch Top 40 Tipparade)	8
Netherlands (Single Top 100 Tipparade)	8
New Zealand (Recorded Music NZ)	43
Scottish Singles Sales (Official Charts)	4
UK Singles (Official Charts)	10
UK Airplay (Music Week)	31
UK Indie (Music Week)	1
US Radio Songs (Billboard)	39
US Alternative Airplay (Billboard)	2
US Mainstream Rock (Billboard)	10

Chart (2024–2025)	Peak position
Global Excl. US (Billboard)	153
Ireland (IRMA)	3
Japan Hot Overseas (Billboard Japan)	18
Sweden Heatseeker (Sverigetopplistan)	8
UK Singles (Official Charts)	8

=== Year-end charts ===
Year-end chart performance for "Live Forever"
Chart (1994)	Position
UK Singles (OCC)	122

Chart (1995)	Position
US Modern Rock Tracks (Billboard)	22

== Certifications ==
Certifications for "Live Forever"
Region	Certification	Certified units/sales
Australia (ARIA)	Platinum	70,000^{‡}
Brazil (Pro-Música Brasil)	Gold	30,000^{‡}
Italy (FIMI) sales since 2009	Gold	50,000^{‡}
New Zealand (RMNZ)	Platinum	30,000^{‡}
United Kingdom (BPI) sales since 2004	3× Platinum	1,800,000^{‡}
^{‡} Sales+streaming figures based on certification alone.

== Release history ==
Release dates and formats for "Live Forever"
Region	Date	Format(s)	Label(s)	Ref.
United Kingdom	8 August 1994	12-inch vinyl; maxi-CD	Creation	
Australia	24 October 1994	CD; cassette	Epic	
United States	January 1995	Alternative radio	Epic	
