= Be Here Now Tour =

1997–1998 concert tour by Oasis

- Tour by Oasis
- Poster showing November–December 1997 tour dates
- Location: Asia; Europe; North America; Oceania; South America
- Associated album: Be Here Now
- Start date: 14 June 1997
- End date: 25 March 1998
- Legs: 9
- No. of shows: 82

Oasis concert chronology
- (What's the Story) Morning Glory? Tour (1995–96); Be Here Now Tour (1997–98); Standing on the Shoulder of Giants Tour (1999–2001)

The Be Here Now Tour was a concert tour by English rock band Oasis in support of their third album Be Here Now. The tour, which spanned the UK, Europe, North America, Asia, Oceania, and Latin America, included 85 shows over a period of several months in 1997 and 1998. The tour started on 14 June 1997 in support of U2 at the KROQ Weenie Roast in Irvine, California, United States, and ended on 25 March 1998 at the Sports Palace in Mexico City, Mexico. With most shows being played during the autumn and winter months, a majority of the concerts were staged at indoor arenas and halls, in contrast to the larger outdoor venues typically featured on Oasis' summer tours.

Many performances were audio recorded by either broadcast media or concert attendees and have since been made available on various file-sharing outlets and fan web sites. A handful of performances were also carried by various television outlets throughout the world, including the 14 December concert at the G-Mex in Manchester, England.

Fueled partly by worldwide stardom and drug use, the tour and corresponding album became "infamous" for the amount of excess and spectacle they provided. Accordingly, they marked the end of the cocaine era for Noel Gallagher. He would later say about the craziness and wild year on tour: "I kid you not, there was a sound guy who quit because there was too much 'food'...and I thought 'sure it's not the fucking coke you've been taking'".

As the tour came to an end, the album's reception had changed from rave and outstandingly positive to less-than satisfied and below average reviews with many critics restating that it was weak in comparison to the group's first two records. They did, however, manage to maintain a large cult following in many countries such as Argentina, Brazil, Peru, Russia, Italy, Spain, South Korea and Japan where their public persona would strengthen even more over the subsequent decade. This was the band's last world tour with bassist Paul "Guigsy" McGuigan and rhythm guitarist and keyboardist Paul "Bonehead" Arthurs before both members left the band in 1999. However, Bonehead returned for the Oasis Live '25 Tour.

== Stage setup ==
Oasis had a unique album-themed stage set up for the tour, featuring props and set pieces for the first time in their career. At various points on the tour, stage items included a Rolls-Royce rigged with stage lights, an oversized telephone box, and other items from the Be Here Now album cover.

At the start of many performances, a man outfitted with a tailor suit and top hat would appear onstage to excite the crowd, beckoning them to scream and clap, while the opening piano loop for the song "Be Here Now" began playing over the concert PA. The band then entered onto the stage through a large door in the prop telephone box, which doubled as an entryway to backstage. As the tour progressed, different shows featured varying types and numbers of set pieces, though the "Be Here Now" introduction remained a constant through the duration of performances.

== Set list ==
This set list is representative of the performance on 14 December 1997 at GMEX Arena in Manchester. It does not represent the set list at all concerts for the duration of the tour.

1. "Be Here Now"
2. "Stay Young"
3. "Stand by Me"
4. "Supersonic"
5. "Some Might Say"
6. "Roll with It"
7. "D'You Know What I Mean?"
8. "Don't Look Back in Anger"
9. "Don't Go Away
10. "Wonderwall"
11. "Live Forever"
12. "It's Gettin' Better (Man!!)"
13. "All Around The World"
14. "Fade In-Out"
15. "Champagne Supernova"
16. "Cigarettes & Alcohol"
17. "Acquiesce"

Other songs performed:

1. "Morning Glory"
2. "Cast No Shadow"
3. "Magic Pie"
4. "My Big Mouth"
5. "The Girl in the Dirty Shirt"
6. "Shakermaker"
7. "Heroes"
8. "Whatever"
9. "To Be Someone"
10. "Talk Tonight"
11. "Half the World Away"
12. "Slide Away"
13. "Help!"
14. "Setting Sun"
15. "I Am the Walrus"

== Tour dates ==
Date	City	Country	Venue	Capacity	Notes
United States					
14 June 1997 (Note: The 14 June 1997 concert in Irvine was a part of KROQ Weenie Roast.)	Irvine	United States	Irvine Meadows Amphitheatre	16,085 / 16,085	
18 June 1997	Oakland	United States	Oakland Coliseum	66,990 / 85,000	Supporting U2
19 June 1997	Oakland	United States	Oakland Coliseum	66,990 / 85,000	Supporting U2
Europe					
8 September 1997	Oslo	Norway	Spektrum		
9 September 1997	Stockholm	Sweden	Ericsson Globe		
10 September 1997	Copenhagen	Denmark	Forum Copenhagen		
13 September 1997	Exeter	England	Westpoint Arena	8,000 / 8,000	Sold Out
14 September 1997	Exeter	England	Westpoint Arena	8,000 / 8,000	Sold Out
16 September 1997	Newcastle	England	Metro Radio Arena	10,500 / 10,500	Sold Out
17 September 1997	Newcastle	England	Metro Radio Arena	10,500 / 10,500	Sold Out
19 September 1997	Aberdeen	Scotland	Aberdeen Exhibition and Conference Centre	8,500 / 8,500	Sold Out
20 September 1997	Aberdeen	Scotland	Aberdeen Exhibition and Conference Centre	8,500 / 8,500	Sold Out
22 September 1997	Sheffield	England	Hallam FM Arena	12,000 / 12,000	Sold Out
23 September 1997	Sheffield	England	Hallam FM Arena	12,000 / 12,000	Sold Out
25 September 1997	London	England	Earls Court Exhibition Centre	20,000 / 20,000	Sold Out
26 September 1997	London	England	Earls Court Exhibition Centre	20,000 / 20,000	Sold Out
27 September 1997	London	England	Earls Court Exhibition Centre	20,000 / 20,000	Sold Out
29 September 1997	Birmingham	England	National Indoor Arena		
30 September 1997	Birmingham	England	National Indoor Arena		
North America					
4 October 1997	New York City	United States	Saturday Night Live		
7 October 1997	New York City	United States	Hammerstein Ballroom	3,700 / 3,700	Sold Out
8 October 1997	New York City	United States	Hammerstein Ballroom	3,700 / 3,700	Sold Out
Europe					
3 November 1997	Lille	France	Zénith de Lille		
8 November 1997	Zaragoza	Spain	Pabellon Principe Felipe		
10 November 1997	Madrid	Spain	Palacio de Deportes de La Comunidad		
11 November 1997	Barcelona	Spain	Palau dels Esports		
13 November 1997	Geneva	Switzerland	SEG Geneva Arena		
15 November 1997	Casalecchio di Reno - Bologna	Italy	Palasport		
16 November 1997	Milan	Italy	Forum di Assago		
17 November 1997	Milan	Italy	Forum di Assago		
19 November 1997	Munich	Germany	Olympiahalle		
21 November 1997	Prague	Czech Republic	Sportovní hala		
22 November 1997	Berlin	Germany	Deutschlandhalle		
24 November 1997	Hanover	Germany	Messehalle		
25 November 1997	Frankfurt	Germany	Festhalle		
27 November 1997	Hertogenbosch	Netherlands	Brabanthallen		
28 November 1997	Oberhausen	Germany	König Pilsener Arena		
3 December 1997	Dublin	Ireland	The Point Depot		
4 December 1997 (Note: Noel took over vocals after Liam got a sore throat.)	Dublin	Ireland	The Point Depot		
5 December 1997 (Note: Noel took over vocals after Liam got a sore throat.)	Dublin	Ireland	The Point Depot		
7 December 1997 (Note: The band walked off stage after Wonderwall due to Paul Arthurs getting hit by a bottle.)	Glasgow	Scotland	Scottish Exhibition and Conference Centre	10,000 / 10,000	Sold Out
8 December 1997	Glasgow	Scotland	Scottish Exhibition and Conference Centre	10,000 / 10,000	Sold Out
10 December 1997	Cardiff	Wales	Cardiff International Arena		
11 December 1997	Cardiff	Wales	Cardiff International Arena		
13 December 1997	Manchester	England	GMEX Arena	10,000 / 10,000±	Sold Out
14 December 1997	Manchester	England	GMEX Arena	10,000 / 10,000±	Sold Out
16 December 1997	London	England	Wembley Arena	12,500 / 12,500	Sold Out
17 December 1997	London	England	Wembley Arena	12,500 / 12,500	Sold Out
18 December 1997	London	England	Wembley Arena	12,500 / 12,500	Sold Out
North America					
8 January 1998 (Note: Concert ended after Fade In-Out due to Liam's voice almost giving out.)	Camden, New Jersey	United States	Sony E-Center	6,602 / 6,602	Sold Out
9 January 1998	Fairfax	United States	Patriot Center		
10 January 1998	Pittsburgh	United States	A.J. Palumbo Center		
12 January 1998	East Rutherford	United States	Continental Airlines Arena		
15 January 1998	Toronto	Canada	Maple Leaf Gardens	12,405 / 12,405	Sold Out
17 January 1998	Rosemont	United States	Rosemont Horizon	12,848 / 12,848	Sold Out
18 January 1998	Minneapolis	United States	Northrop Auditorium		
21 January 1998	Burbank	United States	The Tonight Show with Jay Leno		
23 January 1998	Vancouver	Canada	General Motors Place		
24 January 1998	Seattle	United States	Seattle Center Arena	4,914 / 4,914	Sold Out
26 January 1998	San Francisco	United States	Bill Graham Civic Auditorium		
27 January 1998	Los Angeles	United States	Universal Amphitheatre	11,749 / 11,749	Sold Out
28 January 1998	Los Angeles	United States	Universal Amphitheatre	11,749 / 11,749	Sold Out
31 January 1998	Dallas	United States	Bronco Bowl Auditorium		
1 February 1998	Houston	United States	Theatre at Bayou Place		
5 February 1998	West Palm Beach	United States	West Palm Beach Auditorium		
6 February 1998	Orlando	United States	UCF Arena	3,300 / 3,300	Sold Out
8 February 1998	Atlanta	United States	Fox Theatre		
Asia					
18 February 1998	Tokyo	Japan	Nippon Budokan		
19 February 1998	Tokyo	Japan	Nippon Budokan		
20 February 1998	Tokyo	Japan	Nippon Budokan		
22 February 1998	Hong Kong	China	HKCEC Hall 3		
Oceania					
26 February 1998	Perth	Australia	Perth Entertainment Centre		
28 February 1998	Adelaide	Australia	Adelaide Entertainment Centre		
1 March 1998	Melbourne	Australia	Centre Court		
3 March 1998	Sydney	Australia	Sydney Entertainment Centre		
4 March 1998	Sydney	Australia	Sydney Entertainment Centre		
6 March 1998	Brisbane	Australia	Brisbane Entertainment Centre		
9 March 1998	Auckland	New Zealand	Carter Holt Pavilion		
10 March 1998 (Note: Concert ended after Champagne Supernova due to Liam's drunken antics.)	Wellington	New Zealand	Queens Wharf Events Centre		
South America					
14 March 1998	Santiago	Chile	San Carlos de Apoquindo Stadium	15,000±	
17 March 1998	Buenos Aires	Argentina	Luna Park		
18 March 1998	Buenos Aires	Argentina	Luna Park		
20 March 1998	Rio de Janeiro	Brazil	Metropolitan		
21 March 1998	São Paulo	Brazil	Polo de Arte e Cultura de Anhembi	30,000±	
North America					
24 March 1998	Mexico City	Mexico	Palacio de los Deportes	20,000 / 20,000	Sold Out
25 March 1998	Mexico City	Mexico	Palacio de los Deportes	20,000 / 20,000	Sold Out

=== Cancellations and rescheduled shows ===
Date	City	Country	Venue	Reason
4 November 1997	Paris	France	Bercy	Truck driver strike
6 November 1997	Angers	France	Parc des Expositions	Truck driver strike
7 November 1997	Bordeaux	France	Patinoire	Truck driver strike
14 January 1998	Montreal	Canada	Molson Centre	Ice storm
