= Fade Away (Oasis song) =

Song by Oasis

from the album The Masterplan
- A-side: "Cigarettes and Alcohol"
- Released: 18 September 1994
- Recorded: 1993
- Studio: Loco Studios, Wales
- Genre: Punk rock
- Length: 4:13
- Label: Creation Records
- Songwriter: Noel Gallagher
- Producers: Owen Morris, Oasis

"Fade Away" is a song by English rock band Oasis, written by lead guitarist and principal songwriter Noel Gallagher. Originally released as a B-side to the 1994 single "Cigarettes & Alcohol", it was later included on the B-sides compilation album The Masterplan in 1998. Though not released as a standalone single, "Fade Away" gained popularity among fans and became a staple of the band's early sound.

== Background and recording ==
"Fade Away" was recorded in 1993 at Loco Studios in Wales during the sessions for Oasis's debut album, Definitely Maybe. Despite its energy and thematic similarity to other songs on the album, it was ultimately left off the final tracklist. Instead, it appeared as the third B-side on the "Cigarettes & Alcohol" single, released in September 1994.

An acoustic version of the song, with Noel Gallagher as lead singer and Liam Gallagher on backing vocals, was recorded for the 1995 charity compilation Help!, which supported the War Child charity.

== Composition and lyrics ==
The lyrics of "Fade Away" reflect themes of lost youth and disillusionment, echoing Gallagher's working-class upbringing and experiences in 1990s Britain. It's chorus opens with the lines:

"While we're living, the dreams we had as children fade away..."

This line would later be repurposed as the title for the 2009 live album by Noel Gallagher in support of Teenage Cancer Trust The Dreams We Have as Children – Live at the Royal Albert Hall.

== Reception ==
"It's one of Noel's early classics—bitter, loud, and true. You could build a whole album around songs like this."

— Q magazine retrospective review of The Masterplan

Though "Fade Away" was not released as a single, it became a fan favorite and received praise from critics for its energy and lyrical directness. It has since been cited as one of Oasis's best B-sides, alongside tracks like "Acquiesce" and "The Masterplan".

== Live performances ==
"Fade Away" was played regularly during Oasis's early tours and occasionally appeared in acoustic solo sets by Noel Gallagher. The full-band version was part of the setlist during the Definitely Maybe tour, and the acoustic version gained popularity after its inclusion on Help! in 1995. The band included the song in the setlist of their Live '25 tour.

== Personnel ==
=== Oasis version ===
- Liam Gallagher – lead vocals
- Noel Gallagher – lead guitar, backing vocals
- Paul Arthurs – rhythm guitar
- Paul McGuigan – bass guitar
- Tony McCarroll – drums

=== Acoustic version (Help! album) ===
- Noel Gallagher – vocals, acoustic guitar
- Liam Gallagher – backing vocals
- Johnny Depp – guitar
- Kate Moss – tambourine
- Lisa Moorish – backing vocals.

== Legacy ==
"Fade Away" is widely regarded as one of Oasis's strongest B-sides. In fan polls and retrospectives, it often appears near the top of lists highlighting the band's non-album material. Noel Gallagher has cited it as one of his personal favorites from that period.

== Certifications ==
Certifications for "Fade Away"
Region	Certification	Certified units/sales
United Kingdom (BPI) Sales since 2004	Silver	200,000^{‡}
^{‡} Sales+streaming figures based on certification alone.
