= (What's the Story) Morning Glory? Tour =

1995–96 concert tour by Oasis

- Tour by Oasis
- Poster to the concert in Brussels, Belgium
- Location: Asia; Europe; North America
- Associated album: (What's the Story) Morning Glory?
- Start date: 22 June 1995
- End date: 10 September 1996
- Legs: 12
- No. of shows: 100

Oasis concert chronology
- Definitely Maybe Tour (1994–95); (What's the Story) Morning Glory? Tour (1995–96); Be Here Now Tour (1997–98)

The (What's the Story) Morning Glory? Tour was a concert tour by English band Oasis in support of their second album (What's the Story) Morning Glory?. The tour, which spanned the UK, Europe, the U.S., and Canada, included 103 shows over a period of several months in 1995 and 1996 amidst twelve different tour legs and several cancelled legs in the US and Australia/New Zealand. The tour started on 22 June 1995 with a pre-Glastonbury festival warm up gig at the Bath Pavilion which featured the debut of new drummer Alan White and several new songs off the album which wasn't to be officially released until early October, and ended on 10 September 1996 at the Nissan Pavilion in Bristow, Virginia, when the band decided to halt touring to focus on the recording of their anticipated third album, Be Here Now.

The tour is notable for its UK summer leg of 1996 which consisted of several open-air concerts to record crowds. The tour included such venues as Maine Road in Manchester, Loch Lomond in Scotland, Páirc Uí Chaoimh in Ireland and Knebworth Park in England in which the band played to 250,000 people over two nights. Unprecedented for an open-air concert in the UK at the time, the gig also holds the record for the largest ever ticket demand in history with nearly three million (1 in 20 people) ticket applications.

Whilst the tour was taking place, (What's the Story) Morning Glory? had become a worldwide success and Oasis became one of the biggest bands of the era. The Gallagher brothers regularly made tabloid headlines for their frequent fallouts and rockstar lifestyles. The tour had many disruptions and cancellations due to Noel twice walking out of the group, and Liam pulling out of a US leg. When the band broke up for a brief time in late 1996, several US tour dates and the entire Australia and New Zealand leg had to be cancelled. On one such occasion, Oasis were due to perform on MTV Unplugged at the Royal Festival Hall in London when Liam pulled out minutes before the group were to take to the stage; citing a sore throat as to why he could not perform. Noel had to take over lead vocals for the entire performance whilst Liam heckled him from a balcony in the crowd. The band later found out that Liam did not like performing acoustically.

The Earl's Court and Maine Road gigs were filmed and later released as the Oasis VHS/DVD ...There and Then.

== Set list ==
This set list is representative of the performance on 13 April 1996 at Bill Graham Civic Auditorium in San Francisco. It does not represent the set list at all concerts for the duration of the tour.

1. "The Swamp Song"
2. "Acquiesce"
3. "Supersonic"
4. "Hello"
5. "Some Might Say"
6. "Roll with It"
7. "Morning Glory"
8. "Cigarettes & Alcohol"
9. "Champagne Supernova"
10. "Slide Away"
11. "Cast No Shadow"
12. "Whatever"
13. "Wonderwall"
14. "Don't Look Back in Anger"
15. "Live Forever"
16. "I Am the Walrus"

Other songs performed:

- "Shakermaker"
- "Round Are Way"
- "Rock 'n' Roll Star"
- "The Masterplan"
- "Talk Tonight"
- "Listen Up"
- "Columbia"
- "Fade Away"
- "It's Better People"
- "(It's Good) To Be Free"
- "Rockin' Chair"
- "Take Me Away"
- "Cum On Feel the Noize"
- "My Big Mouth"
- "It's Getting Better (Man!!)"

== Tour dates ==
List of 1995 concerts
Date	City	Country	Venue
22 June 1995	Bath	England	Bath Pavilion
23 June 1995	Pilton	England	Glastonbury Festival
30 June 1995	Roskilde	Denmark	Roskilde Festival
3 July 1995	Milan	Italy	Rolling Stone Club
5 July 1995	Lyon	France	Nuits de Fourvière
7 July 1995	Frauenfeld	Switzerland	Out in the Green Festival
8 July 1995	Belfort	France	Eurockéennes
9 July 1995 (Note: Supporting R.E.M.)	Düren	Germany	Badesee
14 July 1995	Irvine	Scotland	Beach Park
15 July 1995	Irvine	Scotland	Beach Park
18 July 1995	Madrid	Spain	Plaza de Toros de Las Ventas
21 July 1995	Zeebrugge	Belgium	Axion Beach Rock
22 July 1995	Slane	Ireland	Slane Festival
21 August 1995	Kawasaki	Japan	Club Citta
22 August 1995	Kawasaki	Japan	Club Citta
23 August 1995	Tokyo	Japan	Liquid Room
25 August 1995	Tokyo	Japan	Garden Hall
26 August 1995	Tokyo	Japan	Garden Hall
28 August 1995	Osaka	Japan	Imperial Hall
29 August 1995	Osaka	Japan	Bayside Jenny
2 October 1995	Blackpool	England	Empress Ballroom
3 October 1995	Stoke	England	Trentham Gardens
5 October 1995	Bournemouth	England	Bournemouth International Centre
6 October 1995	Gloucester	England	Leisure Centre
10 October 1995	Baltimore	United States	Hammerjack's
11 October 1995	New York City	United States	Roseland Ballroom
13 October 1995	Danbury	United States	Tuxedo Junction
14 October 1995	Boston	United States	Orpheum Theatre
16 October 1995	Pittsburgh	United States	Metropol
31 October 1995	Brussels	Belgium	La Luna
4 November 1995	London	England	Earls Court Exhibition Centre
5 November 1995	London	England	Earls Court Exhibition Centre
7 November 1995	Paris	France	Zénith
10 November 1995	Hamburg	Germany	Große Freiheit
12 November 1995	Cologne	Germany	Live Music Hall
14 November 1995	Nantes	France	La Trocardiére
15 November 1995	Lille	France	L'Aéronef
17 November 1995	Leicester	England	Granby Halls
20 November 1995	Stockholm	Sweden	Annexet
24 November 1995	Copenhagen	Denmark	K.B. Hallen
26 November 1995	Manchester	England	NYNEX Arena
29 November 1995	London	England	Brixton Academy
30 November 1995	London	England	Brixton Academy
2 December 1995 (Note: Deck the Hall Ball)	Seattle	United States	Mercer Arena
7 December 1995 (Note: WHFS HFSmas Nutcracker)	Fairfax	United States	Patriot Center
8 December 1995 (Note: Q101 Twisted Xmas)	Chicago	United States	Rosemont Horizon
9 December 1995 (Note: KEGE Holiday Festival)	Minneapolis	United States	Target Center
13 December 1995	Toronto	Canada	The Warehouse
15 December 1995 (Note: Live 105 Green Christmas)	Berkeley	United States	Berkeley Community Theatre
16 December 1995 (Note: KOME Almost Acoustic Christmas)	San Jose	United States	Event Center Arena
18 December 1995 (Note: KROQ Almost Acoustic Christmas)	Los Angeles	United States	Universal Amphitheatre
19 December 1995	West Hollywood	United States	The Viper Room

List of 1996 concerts
Date	City	Country	Venue
10 January 1996	Utrecht	Netherlands	Music Centre
12 January 1996	Munich	Germany	Terminal 1
14 January 1996	Berlin	Germany	Huxley's
15 January 1996	Bielefeld	Germany	PC69
19 January 1996	Whitley Bay	England	Whitley Bay Ice Rink
21 January 1996	Edinburgh	Scotland	Ingliston Exhibition Centre
22 January 1996	Edinburgh	Scotland	Ingliston Exhibition Centre
23 February 1996	Kansas City	United States	Memorial Hall
24 February 1996	St. Louis	United States	American Theater
26 February 1996	Minneapolis	United States	Orpheum Theatre
27 February 1996	Chicago	United States	Aragon Ballroom
1 March 1996	Milwaukee	United States	Eagle's Ballroom
2 March 1996	Lakewood	United States	Lakewood Civic Auditorium
3 March 1996	Detroit	United States	Detroit State Theater
5 March 1996	Indianapolis	United States	Egyptian Room at Old National Centre
7 March 1996	Fairfax	United States	GMU Patriot Centre
9 March 1996	Upper Darby Township	United States	Tower Theater
10 March 1996	Providence	United States	Strand Theatre
13 March 1996	New York City	United States	Paramount Theatre
18 March 1996	Cardiff	Wales	Cardiff International Arena
19 March 1996	Cardiff	Wales	Cardiff International Arena
22 March 1996	Dublin	Ireland	The Point Depot
23 March 1996	Dublin	Ireland	The Point Depot
26 March 1996	Offenbach	Germany	Stadthalle
27 March 1996	Munich	Germany	Terminal 1
29 March 1996	Milan	Italy	Palalido
31 March 1996	Grenoble	France	Summum
2 April 1996	Barcelona	Spain	Zeleste
10 April 1996	Vancouver	Canada	Pacific Coliseum
11 April 1996	Seattle	United States	Mercer Arena
13 April 1996	San Francisco	United States	Bill Graham Civic Auditorium
18 April 1996	Denver	United States	Mammoth Events Center
20 April 1996	Dallas	United States	Bronco Bowl Auditorium
21 April 1996	Austin	United States	Austin Music Hall
23 April 1996	Dublin	Ireland	The Point Theatre
27 April 1996	Manchester	England	Maine Road
28 April 1996	Manchester	England	Maine Road
3 August 1996	Balloch	Scotland	Balloch Country Park
4 August 1996	Balloch	Scotland	Balloch Country Park
7 August 1996	Stockholm	Sweden	Sjöhistoriska Museet
10 August 1996	Stevenage	England	Knebworth Festival
11 August 1996	Stevenage	England	Knebworth Festival
14 August 1996	Cork	Ireland	Páirc Uí Chaoimh
15 August 1996	Cork	Ireland	Páirc Uí Chaoimh
27 August 1996	Rosemont	United States	Rosemont Horizon
30 August 1996	Auburn Hills	United States	The Palace of Auburn Hills
31 August 1996 (Note: Supporting Neil Young)	Barrie	Canada	Molson Park
2 September 1996	Philadelphia	United States	CoreStates Center
6 September 1996	Worcester	United States	The Centrum
7 September 1996	Wantagh	United States	Jones Beach Theater
8 September 1996	Wantagh	United States	Jones Beach Theater
10 September 1996	Bristow	United States	Nissan Pavilion

=== Cancellations and rescheduled shows ===
Date	City	Country	Venue	Reason
20 July 1995	Lisbon	Portugal	Estádio José Alvalade	Mike Mills had abdominal surgery to remove an intestinal adhesion
25 July 1995	Huddersfield	England	Kirklees Stadium	Complete recording for second album
17 October 1995	Buffalo	United States	Ogden Street Concert Hall	Scott McLeod's departure
20 October 1995	Columbus	United States	Unknown venue	Scott McLeod's departure
21 October 1995	Chicago	United States	Riviera Theatre	Scott McLeod's departure
22 October 1995	Royal Oak	United States	Royal Oak Music Theatre	Scott McLeod's departure
28 November 1995	Birmingham	England	Unknown venue	Liam loses his voice
29 November 1995	Cardiff	Wales	Unknown venue	Liam loses his voice
30 November 1995	Sheffield	England	Unknown venue	Liam loses his voice
15 April 1996	Los Angeles	United States	Universal Amphitheatre	Noel catches the flu
16 April 1996	Phoenix	United States	Unknown venue	Noel catches the flu
12 September 1996	Fort Mill	United States	Charlotte Hornets Training Center	
13 September 1996	Atlanta	United States	Omni Coliseum	
15 September 1996	West Palm Beach	United States	West Palm Beach Auditorium	
16 September 1996	Orlando	United States	Orlando Arena	
18 September 1996	Tampa	United States	Sun Dome	
26 September 1996	Düsseldorf	Germany	Mitsubishi Electric Halle	
29 September 1996	Paris	France	Accor Arena	
30 September 1996	Geneva	Switzerland	Geneva Arena	
2 October 1996	Rome	Italy	Palazzo dello Sport	
4 October 1996	Bordeaux	France	La Medoquine	
6 October 1996	Madrid	Spain	Raimundo Saporta Pavilion	
7 October 1996	Barcelona	Spain	Palau dels Esports	
4 November 1996	Los Angeles	United States	Universal Amphitheatre	Begin recording for third album
5 November 1996	Los Angeles	United States	Universal Amphitheatre	Begin recording for third album
11 November 1996	Hawaii	United States	Unknown venue	Begin recording for third album
15 November 1996	Auckland	New Zealand	SuperTop	Begin recording for third album
18 November 1996	Melbourne	Australia	Melbourne Park	Begin recording for third album
19 November 1996	Melbourne	Australia	Melbourne Park	Begin recording for third album
23 November 1996	Sydney	Australia	Sydney Showgrounds	Begin recording for third album
26 November 1996	Brisbane	Australia	Brisbane Entertainment Centre	Begin recording for third album
29 November 1996	Adelaide	Australia	Adelaide Entertainment Centre	Begin recording for third album
2 December 1996	Perth	Australia	Perth Entertainment Centre	Begin recording for third album

== See also ==
- List of highest-attended concerts
