= Let's All Make Believe =

2000 song by Oasis

Song by Oasis
- A-side: "Go Let It Out"
- Released: February 7, 2000
- Genre: Psychedelic rock
- Length: 3:54
- Songwriter: Noel Gallagher
- Producer: Noel Gallagher

"Let's All Make Believe" is a song by the English rock band Oasis. Written by Noel Gallagher and sung by his brother Liam Gallagher, it was released in 2000 as a B-side to "Go Let It Out", the first single from the band's fourth album, Standing on the Shoulder of Giants. It was left off the standard release of the album but appeared on the Japanese edition.

Critics have often read the lyrics as a comment on the strain between the Gallagher brothers and the possible end of the band. The song has appeared in several rankings of Oasis's best B-sides, and writers have described it as an overlooked highlight of the band's later catalogue.

== Background ==
Oasis lost two founding members, rhythm guitarist Bonehead and bassist Guigsy, while recording Standing on the Shoulder of Giants, which left Noel Gallagher to do much of the studio work by himself. He later told the American journalist Chuck Klosterman that the album should never have been made, saying he had reached the end of his drive and inspiration. Gem Archer, formerly of Heavy Stereo, and Andy Bell, formerly of Ride, joined as replacements.

"Let's All Make Believe" was an album session track. It came out in 2000 as a B-side to "Go Let It Out" and was included on the Japanese edition of the album, but not on other versions.

== Composition ==
The song is built on an acoustic strum in D minor, with a guitar effect in the manner of Vic Flick that Andrew Male of Mojo said evoked espionage. Strings enter after the two-minute mark, which Male compared to the arrangements on Sgt. Pepper's Lonely Hearts Club Band. Chris Catchpole, also of Mojo, described the track as bitter psychedelia.

== Lyrics and interpretation ==
Male wrote that the lyrics are almost certainly about the end of a band, written by one brother for the other to sing. He added that they also deal with the difficulty of saying what you mean, and with the need to believe in brotherhood in order to carry on. The refrain imagines everyone pretending that the two are still friends who like each other, and another line refers back to "Acquiesce", an earlier Oasis song about siblings needing one another. Male also found religious faith in the words, and heard the strings as adding a note of hope to the weary mood. He concluded that it is a song about faith, written by someone who had lost it.

Alexis Petridis of The Guardian wrote that the lyrics address atheism and perhaps the tensions among the band's members. Catchpole found it hard to hear the words without thinking of the souring of the relationship at the centre of Oasis. Brice Ezell of PopMatters said the chorus could not help but recall the feuding between the brothers.

== Reception ==
Writing in 2020, Petridis placed the song at number 20 in a list of the 30 best Oasis songs. He called it an understated pleasure and observed that, for Standing on the Shoulder of Giants, the best songs were found among the B-sides. Mojo ranked it 31st in a 2025 list of 57 Oasis B-sides.

In 2024, NME's Tom Howard placed it 36th out of the 149 songs the band had recorded. He asked why it had been kept off the album, and why it was not chosen as the lead single in place of "Go Let It Out". A PopMatters list of the ten best Oasis B-sides, first published in 2012, put it ninth. Ezell argued that it should have been on the album, and called "Go Let It Out" an underwhelming choice as an A-side.

Ahead of the band's 2025 reunion tour, Petridis included the song among his picks for the setlist. He described it as a downbeat and surprisingly good B-side that would suit the apparently shaky relations behind the reunion, while conceding that it was a long shot. Hamish MacBain, co-author of the book A Sound So Very Loud: The Inside Story of Every Oasis Song, told NME that it was one of the great Oasis songs and a very lost track by the standards of the band's catalogue.
