= Stop the Clocks =

Greatest hits album by Oasis
- Released: 20 November 2006
- Recorded: 1993–2005
- Genres: Rock; Britpop
- Length: 87:18
- Label: Big Brother
- Producers: Noel Gallagher; Owen Morris; David Batchelor; Mark Coyle; Mark "Spike" Stent; Dave Sardy; Oasis

Oasis chronology
Don't Believe the Truth (2005)	Stop the Clocks (2006)	Dig Out Your Soul (2008)

Stop the Clocks is a compilation album by English rock band Oasis. It was released on 20 November 2006 by Big Brother Recordings. The "retrospective collection" is an 18-track double album with the featured songs chosen by Noel Gallagher. It was certified 5× Platinum in the United Kingdom.

== Background ==
The album came about due to the end of Oasis' recording contract with Sony BMG Music Entertainment. Noel Gallagher had previously said that the band wouldn't release a greatest hits album unless they were about to split up. In an interview with news.com.au in December 2005, he hinted that Sony were planning to release one anyway, and that despite his misgivings, he would have to get involved with it otherwise it'd be bad. This was clarified in December 2006, when he told The Guardian that when he made it clear to Sony that the band were not going to re-sign to them, the record label decided to release a greatest hits album. Gallagher then explained that he insisted that it had to be a 'best-of' because he felt a compilation of the best singles, album tracks and B-sides would produce a stronger album than a compilation of singles.

To address some fans' concerns that the release of a greatest hits album was a sign that the band were about to finish, based on some of Noel Gallagher's previous comments, the press release for the album confirmed that they were merely taking "a well earned sabbatical prior to starting work on new material, destined for similar levels of success in the future. As such, this is not a full stop, but merely a time out; a dream set list, and a chance for the world to review the immense contribution that Oasis have made and continue to make to rock 'n' roll."

Gallagher stated in an episode of MTV's Gonzo that the album would be more for future generations, as Gallagher himself became interested in artists such as the Beatles through compilation albums.

To celebrate the release of the album, the band unveiled their first full-length film – Lord Don't Slow Me Down, shot during the Don't Believe the Truth world tour, from May 2005 to March 2006, the film was shown in November 2006 around the world in selected picture houses, theatres and cinemas to winners of fans competitions and the press. It was also broadcast on Channel 4 in the UK.

In Japan, a box set was also released of all their singles to coincide with the album.

== Content ==
Stop the Clocks focuses heavily on the band's first two albums, Definitely Maybe and (What's the Story) Morning Glory?, with each contributing five tracks, plus four B-sides (also included on the band's other compilation album The Masterplan) from this era. Only two tracks appear from Don't Believe the Truth, and one track each from Standing on the Shoulder of Giants and Heathen Chemistry. The album does not feature any material from Be Here Now.

When the release of Stop the Clocks was first announced in July 2006, speculation was rife that the unreleased song of the same name would be included on the record as a bonus track. However, Noel Gallagher told fans at a Q&A session that the song was considered for inclusion, but they weren't happy with any of the many versions they have recorded. It would later be released on Noel Gallagher's High Flying Birds' 2011 debut album.

Gallagher also confirmed that the title was chosen to sum up what was described in the initial press release as being "merely a time out; a chance for the world to review the immense contribution that Oasis have made and continue to make to rock 'n' roll." Noel Gallagher revealed in an interview in April 2005 that 'Stop the Clocks' was the original title for the band's early recorded material in early 2004, which turned eventually into Don't Believe the Truth.

Gallagher revealed to Billboard that he was approached about including some new songs on the album as well, but that he opted not to "because it takes the focus away from what you're actually trying to say with a retrospective."

Gallagher told NME in September 2006 that he picked the tracks on the album, and there were about eight songs that "should be on there, but aren't". He explained that his original vision was for a 12-track album on one CD, but, after whittling down from an initial 30+ tracks, the track listing was finalised. He admitted that he had had arguments with people about the track listing but that "someone has to pick the track listing, and I've picked it and that's the end of it. But that must mean we're pretty good, if people are arguing about what's not on it, it's brilliant!"

During an interview on Radio 1 in October 2006, and later during a question and answer session with The Sun, Liam Gallagher, who got a songwriting credit with his "Songbird", claimed that he was happy with the tracks Noel had selected for the album, although he said that he would have liked "Rockin' Chair" and "D'You Know What I Mean?" to be included. Noel, however, admitted that "D'You Know What I Mean?" was to be included on the album up until the moment it was being mastered, explaining that the length of the song "upset the flow of the album".

Songs that the band also wanted to be on the track listing were "Cast No Shadow", "Don't Go Away", "Gas Panic!", "Whatever" and "Little by Little", although they could not fit them in since they felt the record would "drag on" and make it too long, being over the some 18-track idea Noel had planned out. Noel has also said he would have liked to have found a place for "Fade Away", "(It's Good) To Be Free", "Let There Be Love" and "Listen Up".

In the special boxed edition of Stop the Clocks, at the end of the 'Lock the Box' interview, when Liam was told "Whatever" was not included in the track listing, he exclaimed, "Thank fuck for that."

== Cover ==
The cover was designed by Sir Peter Blake, best known for his design of the sleeve for the Beatles' album Sgt. Pepper's Lonely Hearts Club Band.

== Critical reception ==
Professional ratings
Review scores
Source	Rating
AllMusic	4.5/5 stars
Encyclopedia of Popular Music	5/5 stars
MSN Music (Expert Witness)	B+
NME	10/10
MusicOMH	5/5 stars
PopMatters	7/10
Pitchfork	6.5/10
Slant Magazine	4/5 stars
The Times	4/5 stars
Uncut	5/5 stars

Stop the Clocks received generally positive reviews from music critics upon its release. In 2019, NME ranked it at number 7 in its list of the "28 Greatest 'Best Of' Albums".

== Chart performance ==
The album debuted at number two in the UK charts selling over 50,000 copies in its first day of release and 216,000 in its first week of release, surprisingly not selling enough to knock The Love Album, by Irish boy band Westlife off the top spot. By the end of the year Stop the Clocks had sold 898,000 copies in the UK making it the 7th biggest selling album of the year. It also debuted at number 89 on the US Billboard 200, starting with 18,000 units sold. It did however enter the Japanese Oricon album charts at number one, selling 87,462 copies in its first week.

== Track listing ==
All tracks are written by Noel Gallagher, except "Songbird" written by Liam Gallagher.

Disc one
No.	Title	Album	Length
1.	"Rock 'n' Roll Star"	Definitely Maybe, 1994	5:20
2.	"Some Might Say" (edited version)	(What's the Story) Morning Glory?, 1995	5:10
3.	"Talk Tonight"	The Masterplan, 1998; originally a B-side to the "Some Might Say" single/EP, 1995	4:19
4.	"Lyla"	Don't Believe the Truth, 2005	5:10
5.	"The Importance of Being Idle"	Don't Believe the Truth	3:41
6.	"Wonderwall"	(What's the Story) Morning Glory?	4:18
7.	"Slide Away" (edit)	Definitely Maybe	6:14
8.	"Cigarettes & Alcohol"	Definitely Maybe	4:48
9.	"The Masterplan"	The Masterplan; originally a B-side to the "Wonderwall" single/EP, 1995	5:20
Total length:			44:20

Disc two
No.	Title	Album	Length
1.	"Live Forever"	Definitely Maybe	4:35
2.	"Acquiesce"	The Masterplan; originally a B-side to the "Some Might Say" single/EP	4:23
3.	"Supersonic"	Definitely Maybe	4:35
4.	"Half the World Away"	The Masterplan; originally a B-side to the "Whatever" single/EP, 1994	4:14
5.	"Go Let It Out"	Standing on the Shoulder of Giants, 2000	4:41
6.	"Songbird"	Heathen Chemistry, 2002	2:05
7.	"Morning Glory"	(What's the Story) Morning Glory?	5:01
8.	"Champagne Supernova"	(What's the Story) Morning Glory?	7:29
9.	"Don't Look Back in Anger"	(What's the Story) Morning Glory?	4:52
Total length:			41:55

Japanese bonus tracks
No.	Title	Album	Length
10.	"Roll with It"	(What's the Story) Morning Glory?	3:59
11.	"Let There Be Love"	Don't Believe the Truth	5:30
Total length:			51:24

iTunes bonus tracks
No.	Title	Length
1.	"Cast No Shadow" (live at Knebworth House, Knebworth, Hertfordshire, England, 10 August 1996)
2.	"Columbia" (live at Knebworth House, Knebworth, Hertfordshire, England, 11 August 1996)
3.	"Acquiesce" (music video)

An edited version of the untitled eleventh track from (What's the Story) Morning Glory? (without snippets of "The Swamp Song") appears at 4:50 into "Morning Glory", while the last few seconds of the untitled sixth track from the same album appear at the start of "Some Might Say".

=== Limited edition ===
Along with the regular 18-track album, a limited edition set with a bonus DVD was also released. The special edition includes a 32-page booklet, the 40-minute EPK (titled Lock the Box and featuring Noel and Liam talking about the songs on the record), the full-length trailer for Oasis new rockumentary film Lord Don't Slow Me Down, "Champagne Supernova" featuring John Squire live at Knebworth in August 1996, "Fade Away" live at the Chicago Metro, Chicago, Illinois in October 1994, and a picture gallery. It is encased in a gatefold digipak with a slipcase designed to preserve the set.

=== HMV exclusive bonus DVD ===
With orders from HMV.co.uk, a bonus DVD was packaged with the album. The DVD featured two live songs, "Half the World Away (Live at Glasgow Barrowlands, Glasgow, Scotland, 2001)" and "Morning Glory (Live from V2005)".

=== Best Buy exclusive bonus disc ===
At Best Buy stores, the regular two-disc version of the album was packaged with the Stop the Clocks EP as a bonus disc.

Extended play
No.	Title	Length
1.	"Acquiesce"	4:29
2.	"Cigarettes & Alcohol" (demo)	4:38
3.	"Some Might Say" (live 1995)	5:15
4.	"The Masterplan"	5:22
Total length:		19:44

== Personnel ==
=== Oasis ===
- Liam Gallagher – lead vocals (apart from tracks 3, 5, 9, 13 and 18), Acoustic Guitar on track 15, tambourine
- Noel Gallagher – guitars, lead vocals on track 3, 5, 9, 11 (chorus), 13 and 18, Backing Vocals on track 1, 2, 6, 7, 14 and 16, piano, mellotron, bass guitar (6, 7, 9 and 14) .
- Paul Arthurs – guitars, piano, mellotron (tracks 1–3, 6–13, 16–18)
- Paul McGuigan – bass guitar (tracks 1–3, 6, 8, 10-12, 16–18)
- Gem Archer – guitars and keyboards (tracks 4, 5 and 15)
- Andy Bell – bass guitar (tracks 4, 5 and 15)
- Tony McCarroll – drums (track 1, 2, 7, 8, 10 and 12)
- Alan White – drums (tracks 3–6, 9, 11, 14, 16–18)

=== Additional personnel ===
- Zak Starkey – drums (track 4 and 5)
- Owen Morris – bass (13)
- Anthony Griffiths – backing vocals (12)
- Paul Weller – solo guitar (17)

== Promotional material ==
- The Stop the Clocks EP featuring the 1995 b-sides "Acquiesce" and "The Masterplan" was released in promotion of the compilation on 13 November 2006. New promo videos of those two songs were made and circulated to the music channels, but neither of them featured any of the band in person.
- A promo with the Lynch Mob Beats Mix '95 of "Champagne Supernova" was also issued.

== Charts ==
=== Weekly charts ===
Weekly chart performance for Stop the Clocks
Chart (2006)	Peak position
Australian Albums (ARIA)	34
Austrian Albums (Ö3 Austria)	22
Belgian Albums (Ultratop Flanders)	34
Belgian Albums (Ultratop Wallonia)	18
Dutch Albums (Album Top 100)	73
European Albums (Billboard)	7
French Albums (SNEP)	127
German Albums (Offizielle Top 100)	54
Irish Albums (IRMA)	2
Italian Albums (FIMI)	14
Japanese Albums (Oricon)	1
New Zealand Albums (RMNZ)	18
Scottish Albums (Official Charts)	1
Spanish Albums (Promusicae)	42
Swedish Albums (Sverigetopplistan)	29
Swiss Albums (Schweizer Hitparade)	19
UK Albums (Official Charts)	2
UK Album Downloads (Official Charts)	1
US Billboard 200	89

Chart (2008)	Peak position
UK Independent Albums (Official Charts)	1

=== Year-end charts ===
2006 year-end chart performance for Stop the Clocks
Chart (2006)	Position
Irish Albums (IRMA)	18
Japanese Albums (Oricon)	71
UK Albums (OCC)	7

2007 year-end chart performance for Stop the Clocks
Chart (2007)	Position
European Albums (Billboard)	68
UK Albums (OCC)	55

== Certifications and sales ==
Certifications for Stop the Clocks
Region	Certification	Certified units/sales
Australia (ARIA)	Gold	35,000^{^}
Canada (Music Canada)	Gold	50,000^{^}
Ireland (IRMA)	4× Platinum	60,000^{^}
Japan (RIAJ)	Gold	100,000^{^}
New Zealand (RMNZ)	Gold	7,500^{^}
United Kingdom (BPI)	5× Platinum	1,500,000^{^}
^{^} Shipments figures based on certification alone.

== See also ==
- List of best-selling albums of the 2000s (decade) in the United Kingdom
