= Champagne Supernova =

1996 single by Oasis

Single by Oasis

from the album (What's the Story) Morning Glory?
- B-side: "Slide Away"
- Released: 13 May 1996
- Recorded: May 1995
- Genre: Britpop; psychedelic rock
- Length: 7:27 (album version); 5:08 (radio edit)
- Label: Helter Skelter (Note: Released as a single only in Australia and New Zealand, where Helter Skelter Records distributed Oasis singles.)
- Songwriter: Noel Gallagher
- Producers: Owen Morris; Noel Gallagher

Oasis singles chronology
"Don't Look Back in Anger" (1996)	"Champagne Supernova" (1996)	"D'You Know What I Mean?" (1997)

Music video
- "Champagne Supernova" on YouTube

Audio sample
- file; help

"Champagne Supernova" is a song by English rock band Oasis, written by Noel Gallagher. It is the closing track on the band's second studio album, (What's the Story) Morning Glory? (1995), and was released as the sixth and final single from the album in Australia and New Zealand on 13 May 1996 by Helter Skelter. Paul Weller appears as a guest guitarist and backing vocalist on the track. A music video for the song, directed by Nigel Dick, was released in 1996.

Described by Gallagher himself as “probably as psychedelic as I'll ever get", it features a dreamy, anthemic sound characterized by its expansive instrumentation and atmospheric production. The song begins with a gentle, descending guitar riff that sets a reflective mood, gradually building in intensity. As it progresses, layered guitars and a repeating melodica line create a rich soundscape, complemented by a steady drum beat that drives the song forward, accompanied with the vocals of Liam Gallagher, conveying a sense of longing and nostalgia, with lyrics that are both evocative and somewhat abstract.

Although much debate surrounds the meaning of the song, Noel Gallagher originally described how "Champagne Supernova" resonates with him depending on his mood. However, in later interviews, he has stated that he does not really know what the song means and how "it means something different" to everyone.

"Champagne Supernova" is considered by fans and music journalists alike as one of the most defining songs of Oasis and of Britpop. Alexis Petridis, the chief critic of The Guardian, called it the band's greatest song, claiming it was the "perfect epitaph for swaggering mid-90s hedonism." Upon its release, the song became a radio single in the United States, becoming the band's second No. 1 single on the Modern Rock Tracks chart. It also peaked at No. 20 on the Billboard Hot 100 Airplay, becoming the band's third top 40 single on that chart. The song is included on the band's greatest hits album Stop the Clocks and on the US release of Time Flies... 1994–2009. "Champagne Supernova" has also topped several ranked lists of the band's best songs, including from Consequence of Sound, Medium, Uproxx, and Variety. Supernova SN 2003fg was nicknamed "Champagne Supernova" after the song.

== Background ==
Noel Gallagher said in 2005 that he had still not made up his mind as to what the song actually is about, having previously told an NME interviewer in 1995:

It means different things when I'm in different moods. When I'm in a bad mood, being caught beneath a landslide is like being suffocated. The song is a bit of an epic. It's about when you're young and you see people in groups and you think about what they did for you and they did nothing. As a kid, you always believed the Sex Pistols were going to conquer the world and kill everybody in the process. Bands like the Clash just petered out. Punk rock was supposed to be the revolution but what did it do? Fuck all. The Manchester thing was going to be the greatest movement on earth but it was fuck all. When we started, we decided we weren't going to do anything for anybody, we just thought we'd leave a bunch of great songs. But some of the words are about nothing. One is about Bracket the Butler, who used to be on Camberwick Green or Trumpton or something. He used to take about 20 minutes to go down the hall. And then I couldn't think of anything that rhymed with "hall" apart from "cannonball" so I wrote, "Slowly walking down the hall, faster than a cannonball." And people were like, "Wow, man." There's also the line, "Where were you while we were getting high?" because that's what we always say to each other. But the number of people who've started clubs called 'Champagne Supernova' is fucking unbelievable. And the album isn't even released yet.

In a 2009 interview, Gallagher told the following anecdote for The Sunday Times:

This writer, he was going on about the lyrics to 'Champagne Supernova', and he actually said to me, "You know, the one thing that's stopping it being a classic is the ridiculous lyrics." And I went, "What do you mean by that?" And he said, "Well, Slowly walking down the hall, faster than a cannonball — what's that mean?" And I went, "I don't know. But are you telling me, when you've got 60,000 people singing it, they don't know what it means? It means something different to every one of them."

Gallagher recalled his thoughts on the song in a 2020 interview for SiriusXM:

I was on my last tour and I was playing 'Champagne Supernova'. That song is so long, and I often find myself drifting off enjoying the song and thinking, “What fucking does it mean?” You know, “Walking down the hall faster than a cannonball,” what the fuck is all that about? And I should know, ’cause I wrote it, and I haven’t got a clue. And it was somewhere in the north of England that I happened to glance up at the crowd. It was just a sea of teenagers, all young lads, all with their tops off on each other’s shoulders, singing the words of a nonsensical song by a band that were broke up when — they were two years old when the band fucking broke up. So I think to myself sometimes, you know, “That’s what it means." Because we recorded it and it was written while we were still relatively young. It still appeals to young people, and it’s gone through three or four generations now."

== Critical reception ==
"Champagne Supernova" has received critical acclaim since its release. Steve Baltin from Cash Box declared the song as "another guaranteed smash at all of the same outlets that took 'Wonderwall' to the top of the charts. A melodic power ballad, 'Champagne Supernova' overflows with the songwriting talents of Noel Gallagher. Oasis is proving time and time again that there isn't another rock act out there that can touch the group as a singles band." David Stubbs from Melody Maker wrote, "'Champagne Supernova' has been touted as Oasis' 'Day in the Life' with chords trailing through the water like a gondola to Avalon and the reproachful refrain, Where were you when we were getting high?." John Robinson from NME named it "a slightly peculiar epic", adding that "'Champagne Supernova' is basically 'Cigarettes and Alcohol' with a lifestyle of faster cars, better mini-bars, accompanied by the less-than-sober sense of disorientation that has seeped into this album." Andrew Harrison from Select complimented it as "a delightful, chiming tune with guest Paul Weller going totally Brian May on a hilarious bout of solo'ing. It's the spiritual cousin of 'Supersonic'". Leesa Daniels from Smash Hits gave it five out of five, writing, "Mere words are just not good enough to describe this. It starts slow and gentle, then builds until it explodes all over the place and goes completely mental. Then suddenly it slows down again. It's like having your face caressed, then punched, then stroked again. It's an epic and it'll leave you speechless and it will become known as the best Oasis track ever created."

The song has also been positively received in retrospective reviews. In addition to topping multiple ranked lists of the best Oasis songs, it was named the 4th-greatest by NME, and the 7th-greatest by Rolling Stone. In an interview with Radio X in 2024, Oasis co-founder Paul "Bonehead" Arthurs described how he "fell apart" upon hearing the song the first time, "Noel was saying, 'I'll play you a couple of songs that I've written – I think he played us the whole of the next album. The first one he did was 'Champagne Supernova', from start to finish, in the back lounge of the tour bus, at about 8 o'clock in the evening, and I just fell apart. That's the Cancerian in me. It hit me, I was a blubbering wreck on the floor. I heard it really stripped down, it was just Noel's voice and an acoustic guitar, which is not a million miles away from how it came out, but you knew it was a hit. I was that Oasis fan, hearing it for the first time. It was too much."

== Music video ==
The accompanying music video for the song was directed by British music video and film director Nigel Dick and was filmed at Ealing Studios between 15 and 16 February 1996.

== Live performances ==
The song was played at the majority of Oasis concerts. Noel Gallagher has stated, "I think it's the only song, since it was written, that we've played every night". During the band's (What's the Story) Morning Glory? Tour in 1995 and 1996, and the Be Here Now Tour in 1997 and 1998, the song's ending was usually stretched out by five or so minutes, with Noel playing a long improvised guitar solo. An example of one of these performances can be seen on the DVD ...There and Then. Oasis performed the song at the 1996 MTV Video Music Awards. At Oasis' Knebworth performance, Stone Roses guitarist John Squire made a guest appearance.

After Noel's abrupt departure from Oasis in August 2009 and the band's subsequent dissolution, "Champagne Supernova" became the last original song they performed live together; the last song was a cover of "I Am the Walrus" by the Beatles, as was the case with most of their concerts. During Oasis' split, the song was performed by Noel's follow-up band Noel Gallagher's High Flying Birds, Liam's follow-up band Beady Eye, and Liam during his solo career. During their 2025 reunion tour, it was again played as the last song on their setlist.

== Alternative versions ==
Brendan Lynch was hired to produce an alternate mix and a remix. The alternate mix was eventually released on the Deluxe Edition of (What's the Story) Morning Glory? while the remix was issued on the B-side on a promo-only 12" of Oasis' cover of Slade's "Cum On Feel the Noize". Known as the "Lynchmob Beats Mix", this remix has been reissued on promotional material for the band's greatest hits album Stop the Clocks.

Live versions of the track were released on ...There and Then and Familiar to Millions. A "clean" version, editing out the waves sound effects at the start of the track, was released on Assorted, a free CD issued with the January 1996 edition of Q magazine. It is also available on the Time Flies... 1994–2009 retrospective collection.

In 2024, Noel Gallagher created a six-hour, "ambient mixed" version of the song for the Zoë Law: Legends exhibition at the London's National Portrait Gallery, which includes a portrait of Gallagher himself.

A slowed-down version of the song was used in the teaser trailer for The Electric State (2025) and the trailer for Project Hail Mary (2026).

== Track listing ==
- Australian CD and cassette single
1. "Champagne Supernova" (radio edit) – 5:08
2. "Champagne Supernova" (album version) – 7:31
3. "Slide Away" – 6:29

== Personnel ==
=== Oasis ===
- Liam Gallagher – lead vocals, tambourine
- Noel Gallagher – lead guitar, acoustic guitar, backing vocals
- Paul "Bonehead" Arthurs – rhythm guitar
- Paul "Guigsy" McGuigan – bass guitar
- Alan White – drums, percussion

=== Additional personnel ===
- Paul Weller – lead guitar, backing vocals, whistle
- Owen Morris – Mellotron

== Charts ==
=== Weekly charts ===
Chart (1996)	Peak position
Australia (ARIA)	26
Canada Hit Parade (The Record)	10
Canada Contemporary Hit Radio (The Record)	18
Canada Top Singles (RPM)	11
Canada Adult Contemporary (RPM)	46
Canada Rock/Alternative (RPM)	1
Israel (IBA)	9
New Zealand (Recorded Music NZ)	16
US Adult Alternative Airplay (Billboard)	13
US Adult Pop Airplay (Billboard)	33
US Alternative Airplay (Billboard)	1
US Mainstream Rock Airplay (Billboard)	8
US Pop Airplay (Billboard)	10
US Radio Songs (Billboard)	20

Chart (2025)	Peak position
Japan Hot Overseas (Billboard Japan)	18

=== Year-end charts ===
Chart (1996)	Position
Canada Top Singles (RPM)	83
Canada Rock/Alternative (RPM)	18
US Mainstream Rock Tracks (Billboard)	47
US Modern Rock Tracks (Billboard)	19
US Top 40/Mainstream (Billboard)	44

== Certifications ==
Region	Certification	Certified units/sales
Australia (ARIA)	2× Platinum	140,000^{‡}
Brazil (Pro-Música Brasil)	Gold	30,000^{‡}
Italy (FIMI)	Gold	25,000^{‡}
New Zealand (RMNZ)	2× Platinum	60,000^{‡}
United Kingdom (BPI)	4× Platinum	2,400,000^{‡}
United States (RIAA)	Gold	500,000^{*}
^{*} Sales figures based on certification alone.^{‡} Sales+streaming figures based on certification alone.

== Notable cover versions ==
- British Eurodance band Urban Cookie Collective did a dance cover of this song but Noel Gallagher prevented them from releasing it as a single.
- American pop rock band OneRepublic released a cover as a stand-alone single in 2017.
- American alternative trio Ben Folds Five released a live cover of this song as a B-side to their single "Battle Of Who Could Care Less".
- Scala & Kolacny Brothers covered the song in their 2010 album Circle.
- American rapper Machine Gun Kelly and English singer Yungblud released a cover of the song on YouTube in 2020.
- Filipino rock bands Mayonnaise and Suddenly Monday released on 10 October 2019 a collaborated cover of the song which garnered more than 2 million views as of 7 March 2022.
