= Go Let It Out =

2000 single by Oasis

Single by Oasis

from the album Standing on the Shoulder of Giants
- B-side: "Let's All Make Believe"; "(As Long as They've Got) Cigarettes in Hell"
- Released: 7 February 2000
- Genre: Psychedelic rock
- Length: 4:38
- Label: Big Brother
- Songwriter: Noel Gallagher
- Producers: Mark Stent; Noel Gallagher

Oasis singles chronology
"Acquiesce" (1998)	"Go Let It Out" (2000)	"Who Feels Love?" (2000)

Music video
- "Oasis - Go Let It Out (Official Video)" on YouTube

"Go Let It Out" is a song by English rock band Oasis, written by the band's lead guitarist, and chief songwriter, Noel Gallagher. It was released on 7 February 2000 as the first single from their fourth studio album, Standing on the Shoulder of Giants (2000), as well as their first following the departure of rhythm guitarist Bonehead and bassist Guigsy. The song peaked at number one on the UK Singles Chart and was later certified gold for sales and streaming figures exceeding 400,000 units. It also reached number one in Ireland, Italy, and Spain, as well as on the Canadian Singles Chart.

== Background ==
The song samples the drums from Johnny Jenkins' version of Dr. John's "I Walk on Guilded Splinters". Noel described the song as "the closest we came to sounding like a modern day Beatles" in the 'Lock the Box' interview found on the DVD in the special edition of Stop the Clocks (2006). Due to the departure of guitarist Bonehead and bassist Guigsy in the early recording sessions for Standing on the Shoulder of Giants, (Note: Other factors played a part: as work continued on the fourth album, the band lost two of their founding members. Both Paul "Bonehead" Arthurs and Paul "Guigsy" McGuigan announced that they would be leaving Oasis in August 1999.) the track features only Liam Gallagher (vocals), Noel Gallagher (guitar, bass guitar, Mellotron), and Alan White (drums). (Note: They announced two new members - Gem Archer (formerly of Creation band Heavy Stereo) on guitar and Andy Bell (formerly of another Creation band, Ride) on bass. Neither of these members would appear on the album, however. Standing On The Shoulder Of Giants would feature only Noel, Liam, drummer Alan White, plus a number of session musicians.) Oasis were looking for replacements for founding members Bonehead and Guigsy and while Bonehead was replaced with fellow Creation signing and former Heavy Stereo frontman Gem Archer, Guigsy proved harder to replace. Thus the video for "Go Let It Out" had to be filmed with Noel on bass, White on drums, Archer in Noel's role as lead guitarist and Liam in Archer's role as rhythm guitarist.

The B-side "Let's All Make Believe" was placed by Q magazine placing at number one on its list of the '500 best lost tracks' and at number four on its list of songs to download for the month of January 2006. Q magazine said in the description, "If Standing on the Shoulder of Giants had contained this track, it would have probably got another star." The song featured on the Japanese release of the album. In the "Lock the Box" interview, Noel considers "Go Let It Out" to be "head and shoulders" above any other songs he had written during this time, and "up there with some of the best things I've ever done."

== Music video ==
The video was filmed on location in Surrey, England, by director Nick Egan in November 1999. It features Liam singing on a double-decker bus, before disembarking it and entering a field where Noel, Gem and Alan are performing the rest of the song. The video features an unusual lineup of the band, with Liam playing rhythm guitar, Noel playing bass, and Gem playing lead guitar.

== Track listings ==
UK CD and 12-inch single; Australian CD single

1. "Go Let It Out"
2. "Let's All Make Believe"
3. "(As Long as They've Got) Cigarettes in Hell"

UK 7-inch and cassette single

1. "Go Let It Out"
2. "Let's All Make Believe"

Japanese CD single

1. "Go Let It Out"
2. "(As Long as They've Got) Cigarettes in Hell"
3. "Helter Skelter"

== Personnel ==
- Liam Gallagher – vocals, whistle
- Noel Gallagher – electric and acoustic guitars, bass, Mellotron, Hammond organ
- Alan White – drums, drum loop

== Charts ==
=== Weekly charts ===
Chart (2000)	Peak position
Australia (ARIA)	23
Belgium (Ultratip Bubbling Under Flanders)	10
Canada (Nielsen SoundScan)	1
Canada Rock/Alternative (RPM)	5
Europe (Eurochart Hot 100)	4
Finland (Suomen virallinen lista)	5
France (SNEP)	66
Germany (GfK)	31
Iceland (Íslenski Listinn Topp 40)	12
Ireland (IRMA)	1
Italy (FIMI)	1
Italy Airplay (Music & Media)	1
Netherlands (Dutch Top 40)	31
Netherlands (Single Top 100)	36
New Zealand (Recorded Music NZ)	31
Norway (VG-lista)	3
Scottish Singles Sales (Official Charts)	1
Spain (Promusicae)	1
Sweden (Sverigetopplistan)	14
Switzerland (Schweizer Hitparade)	23
UK Singles (Official Charts)	1
UK Indie (Official Charts)	1
US Alternative Airplay (Billboard)	14

=== Year-end charts ===
Chart (2000)	Position
Iceland (Íslenski Listinn Topp 40)	74
Ireland (IRMA)	63
UK Singles (OCC)	36
US Modern Rock Tracks (Billboard)	71

== Certifications ==
Region	Certification	Certified units/sales
United Kingdom (BPI)	Gold	400,000^{‡}
^{‡} Sales+streaming figures based on certification alone.

== Release history ==
Region	Date	Format(s)	Label(s)	Ref.
United States	18 January 2000	Mainstream rock; active rock; alternative radio	Epic	
United Kingdom	7 February 2000	7-inch vinyl; CD; cassette	Big Brother	
Japan	9 February 2000	CD	Epic	
United Kingdom	14 February 2000	12-inch vinyl	Big Brother	

== See also ==
- List of number-one singles of 2000 (Ireland)
- List of number-one hits of 2000 (Italy)
- List of number-one singles from the 2000s (UK)
