= Oasis Live '25 Tour =

2025 concert tour by Oasis

- Tour by Oasis
- Promotional poster for the tour
- Location: Asia; Australia; Europe; North America; South America
- Start date: 4 July 2025
- End date: 23 November 2025
- Legs: 1
- No. of shows: 41
- Supporting acts: Asian Kung-Fu Generation; Ball Park Music; Cage the Elephant; Cast; Otoboke Beaver; Richard Ashcroft
- Attendance: 2.89 million (41 shows)
- Box office: $525.3 million (41 shows)
- Website: oasisinet.com/live/

Oasis concert chronology
- Dig Out Your Soul Tour (2008–2009); Oasis Live '25 Tour (2025); Oasis Live '27 Tour (2027)

The Oasis Live '25 Tour was a concert tour by the English rock band Oasis. It began on 4 July 2025 at the Principality Stadium in Cardiff, Wales, and concluded on 23 November at Estádio do Morumbi in São Paulo, Brazil. The tour marked Oasis's first live appearances since they split in August 2009. Their reunion and the tour were announced on 27 August 2024, two days before the 30th anniversary of their debut album, Definitely Maybe. Initially, seventeen dates across five cities in the United Kingdom and Ireland were announced, including five dates each at Wembley Stadium in London and Heaton Park in Manchester. Three extra dates were announced on 29 August 2024. Further dates were added and the band eventually performed 41 concerts in 14 countries. The announcement of the tour prompted six of Oasis's releases to re-enter the UK charts, including "Live Forever", which reached a new peak position of #8.

General sale tickets were released on 31 August 2024, with users reporting long queue times, 503 error messages, being mistaken for bots, frustrations with dynamic pricing, limited purchasing time windows, and high reseller fees. Around 14 million people were estimated to have submitted requests for 1.4 million tickets for the 17 shows announced at the time across the UK and Ireland. To satisfy demand, Oasis announced multiple additional concert dates in the UK and Ireland, followed by dates in North America, Australia, South America and Asia, for which dynamic pricing was not used. The support acts for the tour included Cast, Richard Ashcroft, Cage the Elephant, Ball Park Music, Asian Kung-Fu Generation and Otoboke Beaver.

The tour grossed $525,282,160 (almost £397.7 million) and was attended by over two million people, making it the second-highest-grossing and third-most-attended tour of 2025. A book with 1,000 photographs from the tour by Simon Emmett was released in May 2026. A documentary chronicling the tour, Oasis: Don't Look Back in Anger, premiered on September 5, 2026. A follow-up tour, the Oasis Live '27 Tour, was announced nine days later, on September 14, 2026.

== Background ==
Oasis formed in Manchester in 1991 and became one of the defining bands of the Britpop era and one of the biggest bands in the world, releasing seven albums in the 1990s and 2000s. Its constant founding members, brothers Liam and Noel Gallagher, have a famously strained relationship. The brothers split acrimoniously in 2009 during their Dig Out Your Soul Tour, between an appearance at V Festival and a scheduled performance at Rock en Seine in Paris on 28 August 2009. After the group disbanded, the Gallagher brothers each formed their own bands, Beady Eye and Noel Gallagher's High Flying Birds, while regularly insulting each other in the press.

== Initial announcement and reactions ==
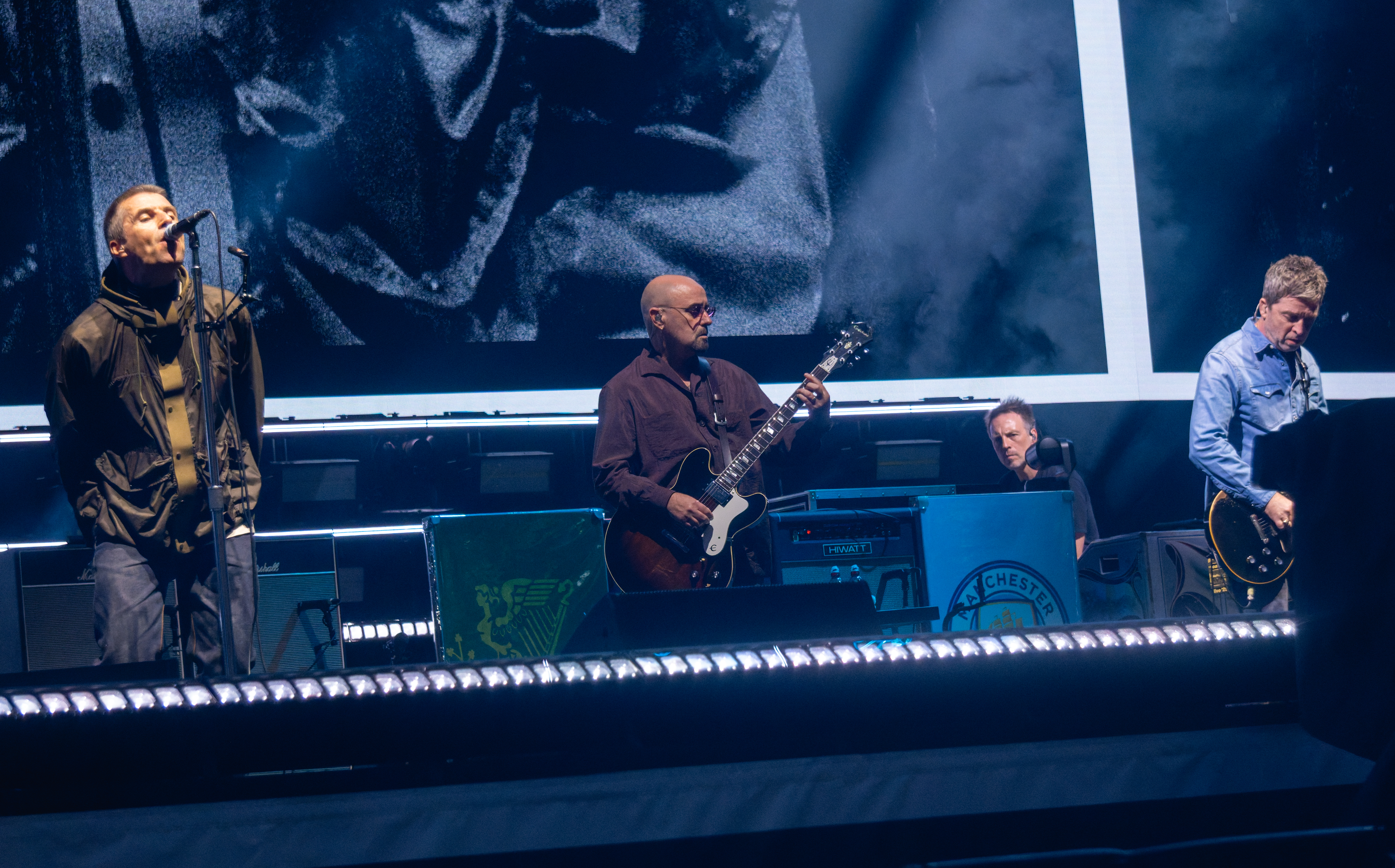
Oasis performing in Cardiff, July 2025

In 2024, around the time of the 30th anniversary of Oasis's debut album, Definitely Maybe, speculation grew that the brothers would reunite. At first Liam denied the stories, though his tweets became more open-ended over time. On 25 August, a 10-second teaser video was shown after Liam's headline set at Reading Festival and Blossoms' show at Wythenshawe Park, with the same teaser video appearing on the band's and both brothers' social media profiles.

On 27 August, two days before Definitely Maybe's anniversary, the band announced a series of dates in the United Kingdom and Ireland between 4 July and 17 August 2025, including five dates each at Wembley Stadium in London and Heaton Park in Manchester. A press release stated that the band planned to visit other continents outside of Europe later that year. Three subsequent dates were announced for 16 July, 30 July, and 12 August due to high demand.

Much of the media reaction focused on the Gallaghers' relationship, increasing the odds of getting tickets, and whether younger female fans deserved to be there. The last of these prompted Noel's daughter Anaïs Gallagher to accuse some fans of ageism and sexism. Alexis Petridis suggested that the brothers' reunion could have been precipitated by Noel's divorce from his wife, which had cost him £20 million. Manchester's nightlife economy adviser Sacha Lord expressed appreciation that the reunion could bring £15 million to the region. The Maldron Hotel chain in Manchester was accused of cancelling bookings in order to resell rooms at inflated prices, prompting them to state that the rooms were overbooked. Live Nation UK came in for criticism from housing activists and politicians in Edinburgh for scheduling that nation's dates during the Edinburgh Festival Fringe, as the city's hotels and Airbnbs were already stretched during its duration.

Some felt that the band's return was an unwelcome 1990s throwback. The Independent's Ashley Davies suggested that fans worried about the Gallaghers assaulting each other should turn their attention to men assaulting women, as the era was notorious for laddishness. The Guardian's Simon Price called Oasis "the most damaging pop-cultural force in recent British history". The same paper's Barbara Ellen wrote on 31 August that, in four days, the band had been "castigated for everything from bad haircuts and 'football crowds' of middle aged fans in parkas and bucket hats who walk funny, to boorishness, sexism, the demise of 90s music culture, and spreading laddism like a virus". She described the tour as "the most controversial band reunion since the Sex Pistols' 1996 Filthy Lucre Tour". Brendan O'Neill wrote on Spiked that he welcomed the reunion due to what he perceived to be the dominance of middle-class artists with conformist views, such as The 1975. During a press conference, the newly elected Prime Minister Keir Starmer welcomed the reunion, stating "I'm glad Oasis are getting back together". During the 2025 Labour Party Conference, Starmer cited "the swagger of Oasis" as one of the things that, in his view, makes Britain great.

On 30 August 2024, Time Flies... 1994–2009, (What's the Story) Morning Glory?, and Definitely Maybe re-entered the UK Albums Chart at numbers 3, 4 and 5, respectively, and "Don't Look Back in Anger", "Wonderwall", and "Live Forever" re-entered the UK singles chart at numbers 16, 17 and 19, respectively. Time Flies and Morning Glory spent a further week at those positions, while Definitely Maybe peaked at number one the following week due to a 30th anniversary re-release; additionally, "Live Forever", "Don't Look Back In Anger", and "Wonderwall" peaked at numbers 8, 9, and 11, respectively. The new "Live Forever" chart position constituted a new peak for the track, as it had only managed number 10 on its original release.

== Sales and subsequent dates ==
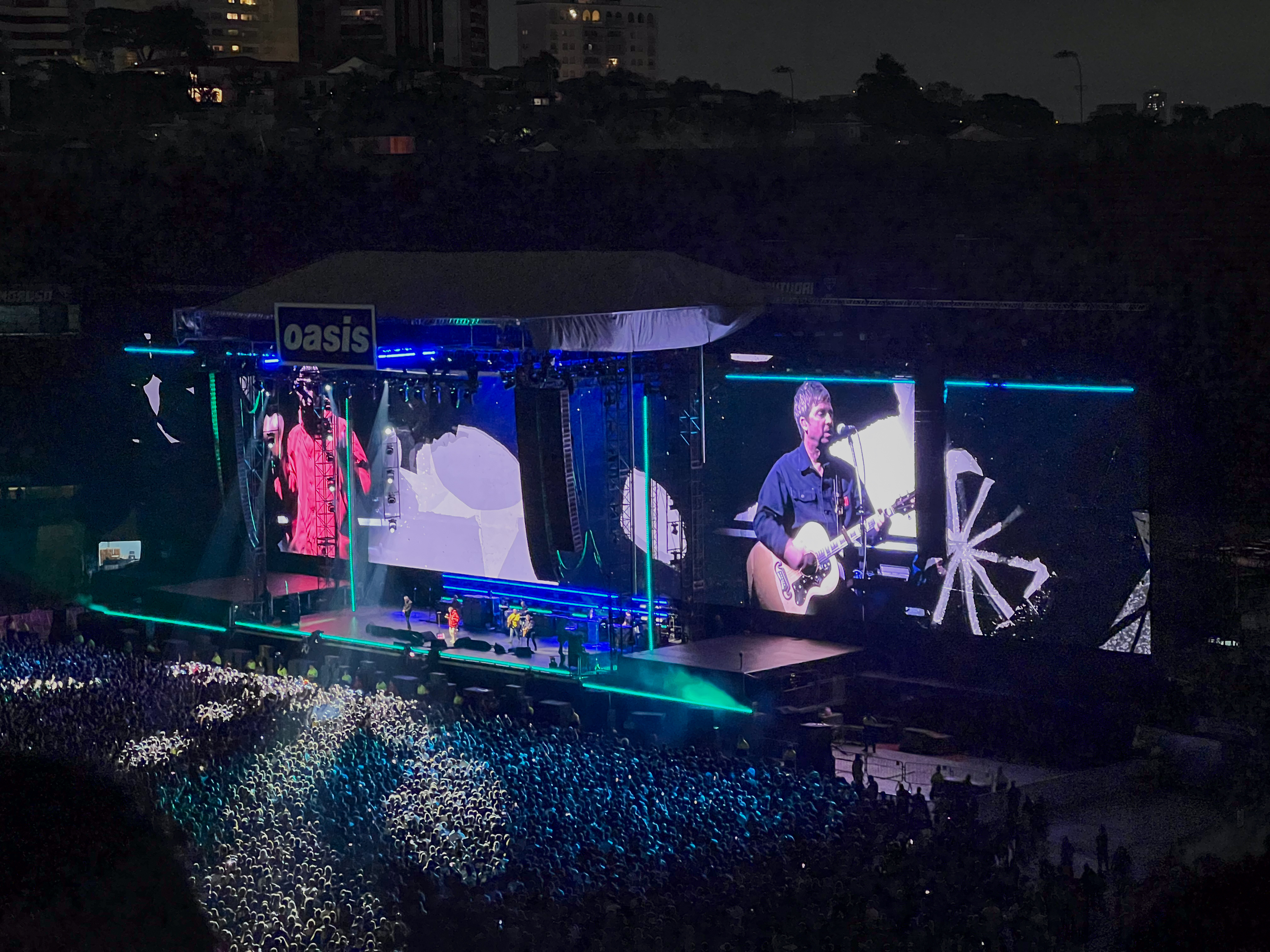
Oasis performing in São Paulo, November 2025

Around 14 million people are said to have joined the scramble for 1.4 million tickets for only 17 shows announced at the time across the UK and Ireland. Between 19:00 and 22:00 on 30 August 2024, select tickets were released during a pre-sale, with seats selling for between £73 and £205, standing tickets for around £150, and premium packages costing up to £506. These tickets went on sale via a ballot, with fans asked how many times they had seen the band and required to identify the name of the band's original drummer, Tony McCarroll. All of the presale codes had been allocated by 14:30 that day. Within minutes of these tickets being released, presale websites were selling them for several thousand pounds; tickets for their 26 July show were being sold for £6,000, prompting responses from the band and the resale company Viagogo. General sale tickets for the Ireland gigs were released at 08:00 BST on 31 August 2024, while sales for the gigs in Great Britain opened an hour later. Sales were handled by Ticketmaster, Gigs and Tours, and See Tickets, while resales were handled by Ticketmaster and Twickets. The tour was promoted by SJM Concerts, MCD Promotions and DF Concerts, all of which had links to Ticketmaster's parent company Live Nation Entertainment. At 13:23 on the day of the public sale, Ticketmaster Ireland announced that their Dublin gigs had sold out, and at 19:00, Oasis tweeted that all tickets had sold out.

Some users reported having over one million people ahead of them in the queue, and others reported waiting in a "queue for the queue". Some users additionally reported 503 error messages and being mistaken for bots. Ticketmaster attracted criticism for selling "In Demand" and "Official Platinum" tickets for inflated dynamic pricing, a practice they defended; The Guardian's Josh Halliday reported having only ninety seconds to make his purchasing decision. As a result of users complaining about their experiences, "#shambles" started trending on X and several hundred fans complained to the Advertising Standards Authority. Twickets also received criticism for their high reselling fees, prompting its founder to announce that they would cap their fees at the lower of "10% + a 1% transactional fee" or £25. On 1 September, Loudersound reported that two nosebleed seats for their 26 July gig were available on Viagogo for £23,603 each, and the Starmer ministry announced that they would probe the practice of dynamic pricing. Three days later, the band announced two additional dates at Wembley Stadium that would have an invitation-only ticket sale, and the day after that, the Competition and Markets Authority launched its own investigation as to whether Ticketmaster broke the law. In late October, the band's promoters announced that they would cancel over 50,000 tickets and put them back on sale at face value via Ticketmaster. In March 2025 the Competition and Markets Authority completed its investigation and said that Ticketmaster "may have misled Oasis fans" with unclear pricing when it put tickets on sale.

On 26 September, NME revealed plans to extend the tour to cities in the Americas, Asia and Oceania; the North American dates were confirmed four days later, while the Australian dates were confirmed on 8 October. Alongside the announcement of the North American dates, the band's management also confirmed in a statement that they would not be implementing Ticketmaster's dynamic pricing system for those shows in an attempt to avoid a repeat of what happened with the UK and Ireland shows. Cage the Elephant were announced as their support act two days later. Upon their release on 4 October, all of the North American dates sold out within an hour. The Independent claimed on 13 October that Richard Ashcroft and Cast would support the band on their UK and Ireland tour, Cast first, though these were not confirmed until 21 and 28 October respectively.

On 4 November, ads started appearing in South American cities along with a post on the band's official social media, teasing an official announcement for the next day. Dates in Buenos Aires, Santiago and São Paulo were officially announced on 5 November. With 132,000 tickets available in total, both Brazilian dates were sold out in under 60 minutes, which prompted rumours of a third and final date in the MorumBIS stadium. On 22 November, Asian shows were announced on the band's official media. Dates for South Korea and Japan were officially confirmed. On 12 March 2025, NME reported that, in addition to the Gallagher brothers, the band for the tour would comprise Andy Bell on bass, Gem Archer and Paul "Bonehead" Arthurs on guitars, and Joey Waronker on drums.

== Set list ==
This set list was taken from the 4 July 2025 concert in Cardiff, Wales.

"Fuckin' in the Bushes" (tape)

1. "Hello"
2. "Acquiesce"
3. "Morning Glory"
4. "Some Might Say"
5. "Bring It On Down"
6. "Cigarettes & Alcohol"
7. "Fade Away"
8. "Supersonic"
9. "Roll with It"
10. "Talk Tonight"
11. "Half the World Away"
12. "Little by Little"
13. "D'You Know What I Mean?"
14. "Stand by Me"
15. "Cast No Shadow"
16. "Slide Away"
17. "Whatever"
18. "Live Forever"
19. "Rock 'n' Roll Star"

Encore

20. "The Masterplan"
21. "Don't Look Back in Anger"
22. "Wonderwall"
23. "Champagne Supernova"

== Tour dates ==
List of 2025 concerts (Note: Attributed to multiple references:)
Date (2025)	City	Country	Venue	Opening act	Attendance	Revenue
4 July	Cardiff	Wales	Principality Stadium	Cast; Richard Ashcroft	140,000	—
5 July	Cardiff	Wales	Principality Stadium	Cast; Richard Ashcroft	140,000	—
11 July	Manchester	England	Heaton Park	Cast; Richard Ashcroft	370,000	—
12 July	Manchester	England	Heaton Park	Cast; Richard Ashcroft	370,000	—
16 July	Manchester	England	Heaton Park	Cast; Richard Ashcroft	370,000	—
19 July	Manchester	England	Heaton Park	Cast; Richard Ashcroft	370,000	—
20 July	Manchester	England	Heaton Park	Cast; Richard Ashcroft	370,000	—
25 July	London	England	Wembley Stadium	Cast; Richard Ashcroft	405,000	—
26 July	London	England	Wembley Stadium	Cast; Richard Ashcroft	405,000	—
30 July	London	England	Wembley Stadium	Cast; Richard Ashcroft	405,000	—
2 August	London	England	Wembley Stadium	Cast; Richard Ashcroft	405,000	—
3 August	London	England	Wembley Stadium	Cast; Richard Ashcroft	405,000	—
8 August	Edinburgh	Scotland	Scottish Gas Murrayfield Stadium	Cast; Richard Ashcroft	210,000	—
9 August	Edinburgh	Scotland	Scottish Gas Murrayfield Stadium	Cast; Richard Ashcroft	210,000	—
12 August	Edinburgh	Scotland	Scottish Gas Murrayfield Stadium	Cast; Richard Ashcroft	210,000	—
16 August	Dublin	Ireland	Croke Park	Cast; Richard Ashcroft	160,000	—
17 August	Dublin	Ireland	Croke Park	Cast; Richard Ashcroft	160,000	—
24 August	Toronto	Canada	Rogers Stadium	Cage the Elephant	100,000	—
25 August	Toronto	Canada	Rogers Stadium	Cage the Elephant	100,000	—
28 August	Chicago	United States	Soldier Field	Cage the Elephant	52,000	—
31 August	East Rutherford (Note: Billed as New Jersey in some promotional material.)	United States	MetLife Stadium	Cage the Elephant; Cast	120,000	—
1 September	East Rutherford	United States	MetLife Stadium	Cage the Elephant; Cast	120,000	—
6 September	Pasadena (Note: Billed as Los Angeles in promotional material.)	United States	Rose Bowl	Cage the Elephant; Cast	180,000	—
7 September	Pasadena	United States	Rose Bowl	Cage the Elephant; Cast	180,000	—
12 September	Mexico City	Mexico	Estadio GNP Seguros	Cage the Elephant	130,000	—
13 September	Mexico City	Mexico	Estadio GNP Seguros	Cage the Elephant	130,000	—
27 September	London	England	Wembley Stadium	Cast; Richard Ashcroft	162,000	—
28 September	London	England	Wembley Stadium	Cast; Richard Ashcroft	162,000	—
21 October	Goyang (Note: Billed as Seoul in promotional material.)	South Korea	Goyang Stadium	—N/a	55,000	—
25 October	Tokyo	Japan	Tokyo Dome	Asian Kung-Fu Generation	110,000	—
26 October	Tokyo	Japan	Tokyo Dome	Otoboke Beaver	110,000	—
31 October	Melbourne	Australia	Marvel Stadium	Ball Park Music	180,000	—
1 November	Melbourne	Australia	Marvel Stadium	Ball Park Music	180,000	—
4 November	Melbourne	Australia	Marvel Stadium	Ball Park Music	180,000	—
7 November	Sydney	Australia	Accor Stadium	Ball Park Music	140,000	—
8 November	Sydney	Australia	Accor Stadium	Ball Park Music	140,000	—
15 November	Buenos Aires	Argentina	Estadio Mâs Monumental	Richard Ashcroft	170,000	—
16 November	Buenos Aires	Argentina	Estadio Mâs Monumental	Richard Ashcroft	170,000	—
19 November	Santiago	Chile	Estadio Nacional Julio Martínez Prádanos	Richard Ashcroft	64,000	—
22 November	São Paulo	Brazil	MorumBIS	Richard Ashcroft	132,000	—
23 November	São Paulo	Brazil	MorumBIS	Richard Ashcroft	132,000	—
Total					2,888,000	£397,700,000

== Personnel ==
Per the Oasis Live '25 Tour programme:

=== Band ===
- Liam Gallagher – lead vocals
- Noel Gallagher – guitar, vocals
- Paul Arthurs – guitar, piano (Note: Absent during both the Asia and Australia legs.)
- Gem Archer – guitar
- Andy Bell – bass
- Joey Waronker – drums

=== Additional musicians ===
- Mike Moore – guitar (Note: Asia and Australia legs only as fill in for Arthurs.)
- Christian Madden – keyboards
- Alastair White – trombone
- Steve Hamilton – saxophone
- Joe Auckland – trumpet
