= The Masterplan (album) =

1998 compilation album by Oasis

Compilation album by Oasis
- Released: 2 November 1998
- Recorded: 1993–1997
- Genre: Britpop
- Length: 66:27
- Label: Creation
- Producers: Owen Morris; Noel Gallagher

Oasis chronology
Be Here Now (1997)	The Masterplan (1998)	Standing on the Shoulder of Giants (2000)

Singles from The Masterplan
- 1. "Acquiesce" Released: 24 April 1998

The Masterplan is a compilation album by the English rock band Oasis. It was released on 2 November 1998 by Creation Records and was the band's final release through the label. The album comprises B-sides that the band had not previously included on an album. Initially intended for release only in regions such as the United States and Japan where the tracks were previously available only on expensive European-import singles, The Masterplan reached number 2 in the UK, where it initially went platinum, and number 51 in the United States. However, it reached the Top 20 in various charts worldwide, selling 3 million copies. It has since been certified triple platinum in the UK. Four songs from the album appear on the 2006 compilation album Stop the Clocks.

== Reception ==
Professional ratings
Review scores
Source	Rating
AllMusic	4.5/5 stars
Chicago Sun-Times	3/4 stars
The Encyclopedia of Popular Music	5/5 stars
Entertainment Weekly	B−
Los Angeles Times	3/4 stars
NME	9/10
Pitchfork	3.7/10 (2000); 8.0/10 (2023)
Q	4/5 stars
Rolling Stone	2.5/5 stars
Spin	4.5/5 stars

The Masterplan received mixed reviews from music critics upon its release. In Rolling Stone, Barney Hoskyns criticised the collection as containing unimaginative songs, with the exceptions of "Half the World Away" and "Headshrinker". Similarly, Matt Diehl of Entertainment Weekly described the compilation as "struttingly inconsistent", also criticising the band's persistent use of Beatles influences. Conversely, Robert Hilburn in the Los Angeles Times offered a more positive review, stating: "virtually all the tunes on The Masterplan are appealing enough to have deserved a spot on one of Oasis' regular albums, and the best rank with the group's finest moments." James Oldham of NME shared similar sentiments, noting that many of the B-sides in the collection were superior to the A-sides they were intended to support. He further observed that the collection highlighted the group's influences, ultimately considering it the band's "third best album". In a 2000 review, Michael Sandlin of Pitchfork was less favourable. While acknowledging that some tracks, such as "Fade Away" and "Headshrinker", were better than certain studio album tracks, he criticised the overall collection as containing largely forgettable outtakes, remarking that "some outtakes are initially scrapped for good reason".

Retrospectively, The Masterplan has received positive reviews, with many considering it one of Oasis' finest works. In 2008, Spin magazine's David Marchese praised The Masterplan as a "greatest hits" collection, featuring "swirling epics, pop-rock confections, [and] headbutt hard rockers". Writing for AllMusic, Stephen Thomas Erlewine offered high praise for the album, stating: "Apart from the sludgy instrumental 'The Swamp Song', there isn't a weak track here, and the brilliant moments are essential not only for Oasis fans, but any casual follower of Britpop or post-grunge rock & roll." On the eve of the collection's 20th anniversary in 2018, Ian King of Stereogum also praised The Masterplan. While he similarly found "The Swamp Song" to be the album's weak point, he noted that the collection features many of the band's best songs. Given the personnel changes the band would undergo following its release, King considers the compilation "the last refuge of the band's dreaming, climbing past; Manchester, Britpop, and all". In 2017, Henry Yates of NME ranked The Masterplan as Oasis' third best album, writing, "by the time this compilation arrived in '98, it came laced with forehead-slapping frustration that Noel didn't hold [these tracks] for a great third album".

== Legacy ==
In 2016, Noel Gallagher, while discussing his disappointment in Be Here Now, expressed regret that the songs included on The Masterplan had been used as B-sides, rather than saved for Oasis studio albums:

It goes back to the fucking giving all those great songs away as B-sides...to write "The Masterplan" and "Half the World Away", "Acquiesce", "It's Good to Be Free", "Headshrinker"...to be as stubborn an idiot as I was, saying 'No, those are the songs that I've written. That's it' is ridiculous. So the germ of the problem lies in me not keeping those songs [for the next album]...

In 2023, The Masterplan marked its 25th anniversary with a reissue, reaching number 2 on the UK Albums Chart. Later in 2023, two songs from the album, "The Masterplan" and "Going Nowhere", were re-recorded by Noel Gallagher's High Flying Birds at Abbey Road Studios.

== Track listing ==
All tracks are written by Noel Gallagher, except where noted.

The Masterplan track listing
No.	Title	Writer(s)	Single	Length
1.	"Acquiesce"		"Some Might Say" (1995)	4:25
2.	"Underneath the Sky"		"Don't Look Back in Anger" (1996)	3:21
3.	"Talk Tonight"		"Some Might Say"	4:21
4.	"Going Nowhere"		"Stand by Me" (1997)	4:39
5.	"Fade Away"		"Cigarettes & Alcohol" (1994)	4:13
6.	"The Swamp Song"		"Wonderwall" (1995)	4:19
7.	"I Am the Walrus" (live, edited by almost 2 minutes)	John Lennon, Paul McCartney	"Cigarettes & Alcohol"	6:25
8.	"Listen Up" (edited by 18 seconds)		"Cigarettes & Alcohol"	6:21
9.	"Rockin' Chair"	N. Gallagher, Chris Griffiths	"Roll with It" (1995)	4:35
10.	"Half the World Away"		"Whatever" (1994)	4:21
11.	"(It's Good) To Be Free"		"Whatever"	4:18
12.	"Stay Young"		"D'You Know What I Mean?" (1997)	5:05
13.	"Headshrinker"		"Some Might Say"	4:38
14.	"The Masterplan"		"Wonderwall"	5:23
Total length:				66:23

== Personnel ==
=== Oasis ===
- Liam Gallagher – lead vocals (1, 2, 5, 7–9, 11–13), tambourine
- Noel Gallagher – lead guitar, acoustic guitar, backing vocals, lead vocals (1, 3, 4, 10, 14), bass (4, 6, 14), piano (2), drums (10), strings and horn arrangements (4, 14), production
- Paul "Bonehead" Arthurs – rhythm guitar (1, 5, 6, 7) acoustic guitar, keyboards (2, 3, 8–11, 14), accordion (11)
- Paul "Guigsy" McGuigan – bass (1, 2, 5, 7–9, 11–13)
- Alan "Whitey" White – drums, percussion (2, 4, 6, 9, 12, 14)
- Tony McCarroll – drums (1, 5, 7, 8, 11, 13)

=== Additional personnel ===
- Mike Rowe – keyboards (4, 12)
- Paul Weller – harmonica, lead guitar (6)
- Nick Ingman – strings and horn arrangements (4, 14)
- Owen Morris – bass (10), production, mixing
- Mike Marsh – mastering at The Exchange

== Charts and certifications ==
=== Weekly charts ===
1998 weekly chart performance for The Masterplan
Chart (1998)	Peak position
Australian Albums (ARIA)	36
Canadian Albums (Billboard)	11
Dutch Albums (Album Top 100)	55
Finnish Albums (Suomen virallinen lista)	32
French Albums (SNEP)	20
German Albums (Offizielle Top 100)	55
Irish Albums (IRMA)	3
Japanese Albums (Oricon)	5
Norwegian Albums (VG-lista)	18
Scottish Albums (Official Charts)	2
Spanish Albums (AFYVE)	34
Swedish Albums (Sverigetopplistan)	20
Swiss Albums (Schweizer Hitparade)	40
UK Albums (Official Charts)	2
US Billboard 200	51

2023 weekly chart performance for The Masterplan
Chart (2023)	Peak position
Belgian Albums (Ultratop Wallonia)	117
Italian Albums (FIMI)	71
Spanish Albums (Promusicae)	96
UK Albums (Official Charts)	2

=== Certifications ===
Certifications for The Masterplan
Region	Certification	Certified units/sales
Canada (Music Canada)	Gold	50,000^{^}
Japan (RIAJ)	Gold	100,000^{^}
United Kingdom (BPI)	3× Platinum	1,000,000+
^{^} Shipments figures based on certification alone.
