= Paul McGuigan =

Paul McGuigan is the name of:

- Paul McGuigan (musician) (born 1971), aka Guigsy, English musician, former bassist in the band Oasis
- Paul McGuigan (director) (born 1963), Scottish filmmaker
