= Headshrinker =

Head shrinker can mean:

- A song by the band Oasis, appearing on the album The Masterplan
- A maker of shrunken heads
- A slang word for a mental health professional such as a psychiatrist or psychotherapist.
- The Headshrinkers, a professional wrestling tag team
