= Slide Away (Oasis song) =

- "Slide Away" promotional single cover

Promotional single by Oasis

from the album Definitely Maybe
- Released: 29 August 1994
- Recorded: Spring 1994
- Studio: Monnow Valley (Rockfield, Wales)
- Genre: Britpop; rock
- Length: 6:32
- Label: Creation
- Songwriter: Noel Gallagher
- Producer: Dave Batchelor

Lyric video
- "Slide Away" on YouTube

"Slide Away" is a song by the English rock band Oasis, taken from their debut studio album Definitely Maybe (1994). It was written by lead guitarist Noel Gallagher and serves as the tenth track on the album. It was also released as a promotional single in certain regions and used as a B-side on a few subsequent singles, including "Whatever" and "Champagne Supernova". It is widely regarded by both fans and critics as one of the band’s best songs. Rolling Stone ranked it 11th on its list of the top 40 Oasis tracks, while The Guardian placed it second.

== Composition and recording ==
=== Writing ===
Noel Gallagher claims he wrote "Slide Away" on a Gibson Les Paul guitar that Johnny Marr sent to him, since he had few guitars available to him at the time. On the Definitely Maybe DVD, he recalls that he took Marr's guitar out of the case, sat down, and "the song wrote itself". Gallagher wrote it about his girlfriend at the time, Louise Jones, and their stormy relationship. He described he and her as "soulmates", and when they ultimately split up in June 1994, Gallagher said, "I don't think I'll ever get over it."

=== Recording ===
During the recording of Definitely Maybe, there was an argument between Noel Gallagher and rhythm guitarist Paul "Bonehead" Arthurs. Gallagher was taken to the pub by bassist Paul "Guigsy" McGuigan, where he calmed down, had a few drinks, went back to the studio and recorded "Slide Away". While McGuigan originally participated in the recording, his bass part was re-recorded by Gallagher.

The song was recorded during the initial Monnow Valley Studio sessions and produced by Dave Batchelor. During recording, Batchelor stood in front of drummer Tony McCarroll and pointed at each of his two crash cymbals in turn, to make sure that McCarroll alternated the cymbals across the stereo image.

Batchelor and the band had an argument about the song's tempo, which was ultimately ended by the suggestion of engineer Dave Scott. The band completed the final take afterwards, but Batchelor was angered and fired Scott over the incident. Scott was later informed by Mark Coyle that "Slide Away" was the only song kept from the Monnow Valley sessions, after being remixed by Owen Morris.

=== Style ===
Recalling the style of "Slide Away", Alex Niven wrote that the song "adopts the classic grunge technique" by combining a "heavy rock base with a melody that alludes to Neil Young and the Beatles".

In an interview on the bonus DVD of Oasis' greatest hits album Stop the Clocks, Noel comments that the track contains his brother Liam's best ever singing.

== Release ==
"Slide Away" was released as the tenth track on Definitely Maybe on August 29, 1994. It subsequently appeared as a B-side on the singles "Whatever" and "Champagne Supernova". In the Stop the Clocks interview, Gallagher claimed that he was told to release it as a fifth single from Definitely Maybe, but he refused, arguing, "You can't have five [singles] off a debut album."

A limited edition UK promotional CD was pressed to celebrate the band's success at the 1995 Brit Awards. The song is included on Stop the Clocks in a slightly different mix. Noel's backing vocals during the bridge are removed, and it is this version that has been included in reissues of Definitely Maybe since.

== Live performances ==
Both of the Gallagher brothers have stated that "Slide Away" should have been played more often at concerts, and despite this it remains a favourite. It was ultimately included on the setlist of the band's 2008-09 Dig Out Your Soul Tour. It was described by guitarist Gem Archer as "the one for the fans".

A live version recorded on 17 April 1995 at the Southend Cliffs Pavilion was included on the video album Live by the Sea.

A live version of the song was released in 2007 on Noel Gallagher's live album The Dreams We Have as Children – Live at the Royal Albert Hall.

Liam Gallagher has performed the song at his solo concerts, most notably at the Glastonbury Festival in 2017 and the Reading and Leeds Festivals in 2024 as well as his Definitely Maybe 30th Anniversary tour.

The track is included on the setlist of Oasis' Live '25 Tour and a version of the song performed at Principality Stadium in Cardiff on July 4 was released as a single.

== Reception ==
"Slide Away" received critical acclaim and remains one of the band's most celebrated tracks by both journalists and fans.

While reviewing Definitely Maybe, NME writer Keith Cameron described "Slide Away" as "a completely heart-rending love song" that showed the band possessing "both the sweetness and tenderness to complement their well-proven hooligan qualities". In his 5-star review of Definitely Maybe, Select critic Andrew Perry called the song a "vision of escape, love and happiness".

NME ranked "Slide Away" at number 57 in its list of "The 100 Greatest Britpop Songs", and subsequently ranked it number 1 in its list of greatest Oasis songs. Paste ranked it number 1, The Guardian ranked it number 2, UPROXX ranked it number 3, The Independent ranked it number 8, and Rolling Stone ranked it number 11 in their respective lists of all-time greatest Oasis songs. GibsonGuitar.com also listed the song as one of Noel Gallagher's best guitar tracks.

Noel claims that "Slide Away" is Paul McCartney's favourite Oasis song.

== Personnel ==
Oasis

- Liam Gallagher – lead vocals, tambourine
- Noel Gallagher – lead guitars, backing vocals, bass
- Paul Arthurs – rhythm guitar
- Tony McCarroll – drums

Additional personnel

- David Batchelor – production
- Owen Morris – additional production, mixing
- Barry Grint – mastering at Abbey Road Studios, London
- Anjali Dutt – engineering
- Dave Scott – engineering, mixing
- Roy Spong – engineering

== Charts ==
Chart performance for "Slide Away"
Chart (2025)	Peak position
Ireland (IRMA)	64
UK Singles (OCC)	31

== Certifications ==
Certifications for "Slide Away"
Region	Certification	Certified units/sales
United Kingdom (BPI)	Platinum	600,000^{‡}
^{‡} Sales+streaming figures based on certification alone.
