= Tuxedo Junction (disambiguation) =

Tuxedo Junction may refer to:

- "Tuxedo Junction", a popular song written by Erskine Hawkins, Bill Johnson, Julian Dash, and Buddy Feyne.
- Tuxedo Junction (film), a 1941 comedy film
- Tuxedo Junction (music venue), a live music venue in Danbury, Connecticut
