= List of number-one singles of 2000 (Ireland) =

This is a list of the Irish Recorded Music Association's Irish Singles Chart Top 50 number-ones of 2000.

Issue date	Song	Artist
1 January	"I Have a Dream"/"Seasons in the Sun"	Westlife
8 January	"I Have a Dream"/"Seasons in the Sun"	Westlife
15 January	"I Have a Dream"/"Seasons in the Sun"	Westlife
22 January	"Born to Make You Happy"	Britney Spears
29 January	"Born to Make You Happy"	Britney Spears
5 February	"Silence"	Delerium
12 February	"Go Let It Out"	Oasis
19 February	"Rise"	Gabrielle
26 February	"Pure Shores"	All Saints
4 March	"Maniac 2000"	Mark McCabe
11 March	"Maniac 2000"	Mark McCabe
18 March	"Maniac 2000"	Mark McCabe
25 March	"Maniac 2000"	Mark McCabe
1 April	"Maniac 2000"	Mark McCabe
8 April	"Maniac 2000"	Mark McCabe
15 April	"Maniac 2000"	Mark McCabe
22 April	"Maniac 2000"	Mark McCabe
29 April	"Maniac 2000"	Mark McCabe
6 May	"Maniac 2000"	Mark McCabe
13 May	"The Bad Touch"	Bloodhound Gang
20 May	"The Bad Touch"	Bloodhound Gang
27 May	"The Bad Touch"	Bloodhound Gang
3 June	"The Bad Touch"	Bloodhound Gang
10 June	"Gotta Tell You"	Samantha Mumba
17 June	"Gotta Tell You"	Samantha Mumba
24 June	"Gotta Tell You"	Samantha Mumba
1 July	"Gotta Tell You"	Samantha Mumba
8 July	"Gotta Tell You"	Samantha Mumba
15 July	"Life Is a Rollercoaster"	Ronan Keating
22 July	"The Real Slim Shady"	Eminem
29 July	"The Real Slim Shady"	Eminem
5 August	"Rock DJ"	Robbie Williams
12 August	"Rock DJ"	Robbie Williams
19 August	"Rock DJ"	Robbie Williams
26 August	"Rock DJ"	Robbie Williams
2 September	"Groovejet (If This Ain't Love)"	Spiller
9 September	"Groovejet (If This Ain't Love)"	Spiller
16 September	"Lady (Hear Me Tonight)"	Modjo
23 September	"Against All Odds"	Mariah Carey featuring Westlife
30 September	"Against All Odds"	Mariah Carey featuring Westlife
7 October	"Against All Odds"	Mariah Carey featuring Westlife
14 October	"Beautiful Day"	U2
21 October	"Beautiful Day"	U2
28 October	"Beautiful Day"	U2
4 November	"My Love"	Westlife
11 November	"My Love"	Westlife
18 November	"My Love"	Westlife
25 November	"Can't Fight the Moonlight"	LeAnn Rimes
2 December	"Can't Fight the Moonlight"	LeAnn Rimes
9 December	"Stan"	Eminem
16 December	"Stan"	Eminem
23 December	"Stan"	Eminem
30 December	"Stan"	Eminem

== See also ==
- 2000 in music
- List of artists who reached number one in Ireland
