= Oasis Live '27 Tour =

2027 concert tour by Oasis

- Tour by Oasis
- Promotional poster for the tour
- Location: Europe; North America
- Start date: 21 May 2027
- End date: 26 September 2027
- Legs: 1
- No. of shows: 42
- Supporting act: Richard Ashcroft

Oasis concert chronology
- Oasis Live '25 Tour (2025); Oasis Live '27 Tour (2027)

The Oasis Live '27 Tour is an upcoming concert tour by the English rock band Oasis. It is set to begin at Celtic Park in Glasgow, Scotland on 21 May 2027. The tour is set to feature forty-two dates across eleven cities in the United Kingdom, continental Europe and the United States, including eleven dates at Manchester's Etihad Stadium and six dates at Knebworth Park their first since their historic appearance at the 1996 Knebworth Festival. Richard Ashcroft is set to be the opening act for all dates.

The tour was announced on 14 September 2026, nine days after the world premiere of the documentary Oasis: Don't Look Back in Anger, which chronicled their 2025 reunion tour. To avoid the controversy surrounding online queue times and dynamic pricing experienced during their previous reunion, the band implemented a pre-registration ticket ballot instead of a standard general sale, with registration closing on 17 September.

== Tour dates ==
List of 2027 concerts
Date (2027)	City	Country	Venue	Opening act	Attendance	Revenue
21 May	Glasgow	Scotland	Celtic Park	Richard Ashcroft	—	—
23 May	Glasgow	Scotland	Celtic Park	Richard Ashcroft	—	—
25 May	Glasgow	Scotland	Celtic Park	Richard Ashcroft	—	—
28 May	Glasgow	Scotland	Celtic Park	Richard Ashcroft	—	—
29 May	Glasgow	Scotland	Celtic Park	Richard Ashcroft	—	—
4 June	Manchester	England	Etihad Stadium	Richard Ashcroft	—	—
6 June	Manchester	England	Etihad Stadium	Richard Ashcroft	—	—
8 June	Manchester	England	Etihad Stadium	Richard Ashcroft	—	—
11 June	Manchester	England	Etihad Stadium	Richard Ashcroft	—	—
12 June	Manchester	England	Etihad Stadium	Richard Ashcroft	—	—
15 June	Manchester	England	Etihad Stadium	Richard Ashcroft	—	—
18 June	Manchester	England	Etihad Stadium	Richard Ashcroft	—	—
19 June	Manchester	England	Etihad Stadium	Richard Ashcroft	—	—
22 June	Manchester	England	Etihad Stadium	Richard Ashcroft	—	—
25 June	Manchester	England	Etihad Stadium	Richard Ashcroft	—	—
26 June	Manchester	England	Etihad Stadium	Richard Ashcroft	—	—
2 July	Munich	Germany	Allianz Arena	Richard Ashcroft	—	—
3 July	Munich	Germany	Allianz Arena	Richard Ashcroft	—	—
6 July	Munich	Germany	Allianz Arena	Richard Ashcroft	—	—
10 July	Barcelona	Spain	Estadi Olímpic Lluís Companys	Richard Ashcroft	—	—
11 July	Barcelona	Spain	Estadi Olímpic Lluís Companys	Richard Ashcroft	—	—
16 July	Amsterdam	Netherlands	Johan Cruijff Arena	Richard Ashcroft	—	—
17 July	Amsterdam	Netherlands	Johan Cruijff Arena	Richard Ashcroft	—	—
20 July (Note: The concert of July 20, 2027, at the Stade de France was originally set to take place on July 24, 2027, but was rescheduled due to railway engineering works near the venue.)	Saint-Denis (Note: Billed as Paris in promotional material.)	France	Stade de France	Richard Ashcroft	—	—
23 July	Saint-Denis	France	Stade de France	Richard Ashcroft	—	—
26 July	Rome	Italy	Stadio Olimpico	Richard Ashcroft	—	—
29 July	Rome	Italy	Stadio Olimpico	Richard Ashcroft	—	—
30 July	Rome	Italy	Stadio Olimpico	Richard Ashcroft	—	—
10 August	Foxborough (Note: Billed as Boston in promotional material.)	United States	Gillette Stadium	Richard Ashcroft	—	—
13 August	Foxborough	United States	Gillette Stadium	Richard Ashcroft	—	—
14 August	Foxborough	United States	Gillette Stadium	Richard Ashcroft	—	—
20 August	Paradise (Note: Billed as Las Vegas in promotional material.)	United States	Allegiant Stadium	Richard Ashcroft	—	—
21 August	Paradise	United States	Allegiant Stadium	Richard Ashcroft	—	—
24 August	Paradise	United States	Allegiant Stadium	Richard Ashcroft	—	—
4 September	Slane	Ireland	Slane Castle	Richard Ashcroft	—	—
5 September	Slane	Ireland	Slane Castle	Richard Ashcroft	—	—
11 September	Stevenage	England	Knebworth Park	Richard Ashcroft	—	—
12 September	Stevenage	England	Knebworth Park	Richard Ashcroft	—	—
18 September	Stevenage	England	Knebworth Park	Richard Ashcroft	—	—
19 September	Stevenage	England	Knebworth Park	Richard Ashcroft	—	—
25 September	Stevenage	England	Knebworth Park	Richard Ashcroft	—	—
26 September	Stevenage	England	Knebworth Park	Richard Ashcroft	—	—
