= Talk Tonight =

Song by Oasis
- A-side: "Some Might Say"
- Released: 24 April 1995
- Recorded: 8 October 1994
- Studio: The Congress House, Austin, Texas
- Genre: Folk rock; Britpop
- Length: 4:21
- Label: Creation
- Songwriter: Noel Gallagher
- Producers: Owen Morris, Noel Gallagher

Lyric video
- "Oasis - Talk Tonight (Official Lyric Video)" on YouTube

"Talk Tonight" is a song by English rock band Oasis, written and sung by the band's lead guitarist Noel Gallagher. It was originally released on 24 April 1995 as the B-side of their UK number one single "Some Might Say" along with "Acquiesce" and "Headshrinker" and appears on the B-side compilation album, The Masterplan, released in November 1998. In the United States, it was released as one of the B-sides to "Wonderwall". This song also appears in remastered form on the 2014 deluxe version of (What's the Story) Morning Glory?.

== Background and inspiration ==
"Talk Tonight" is one of many acoustic B-side tracks sung by Noel. The song was inspired by the near-breakup of the band in autumn 1994, when Noel temporarily quit the band after an infamously poor show at the Whisky a Go Go in Los Angeles. Noel travelled to San Francisco without informing the rest of the band or management, staying with a woman he had befriended during the band's previous show there. According to the sleeve notes to The Masterplan, she talked a distraught Noel "off the ledge" and took him to the park where she had played as a child. It is also mentioned in the Oasis book by Paul Mathurs, Take Me There, that she also had an obsession with Snapple strawberry lemonade, which contributed to the line in the song, "all your dreams are made of strawberry lemonade." In the 2016 documentary film Supersonic, Noel claimed not to remember the woman's name or what she looked like.

In an interview with the San Francisco Chronicle in November 2016, Melissa Lim claimed to be the woman who inspired the song, presenting as proof photos of herself and Noel in San Francisco during the period. Lim stated that she met Noel backstage at Bottom of the Hill in 1994, recalling: "He came over and sat down next to me, I had never been backstage before, so I asked him, 'Where's the afterparty?' And he goes, 'What afterparty? Can I hang out with you tonight?'". Three days later, after a disastrous performance at Whisky a Go Go in Los Angeles, and after a dispute with Liam, Noel went to Lim's apartment in Nob Hill. "He was very upset," said Lim. "I took him in, fed him and tried to calm him down. He wanted to break up the band. We went to Huntington Park to clear his mind. We listened to music. We went record shopping". After bringing back magazines and Snapple Strawberry Lemonade, Lim then convinced Noel to return to Oasis, "San Francisco has a reputation of being a place where bands come to die, like The Band and the Sex Pistols," says Lim. "I wasn't going to let it happen on my watch. I told him, 'You can't leave the band — you're on the verge of something big.'" Regarding Noel stating that he could not remember the woman he wrote the song about, Lim stated "Keith Richards can remember the name of his milkman from when he was 8 years old. I don't know what's going on with Noel, and that's fine. I was a part of something that touched so many people. That's good enough." Lim subsequently attended the band's September 6 show on their Live '25 Tour at the Rose Bowl.

== Other use ==
The song is also featured on the DVD Live by the Sea after Noel makes a mistake on the track "D'Yer Wanna Be A Spaceman?" and abandons the song. The song is also included on Oasis' compilation album Stop the Clocks. Paul Weller played keyboards when Oasis performed this song on Channel 4's The White Room in 1995.

== In media ==
- An extract of the song was used in the 2008 GCSE Music Listening Paper Exam.
- The song was featured in an episode of popular British soap EastEnders at Jase Dyer's funeral.
- The song was performed at Oasis' MTV Unplugged concert in August 1996.

== Personnel ==
- Noel Gallagher – lead and backing vocals, acoustic guitar, handclaps
- Paul Arthurs – acoustic guitar, electric piano, handclaps

== Certifications ==
Region	Certification	Certified units/sales
United Kingdom (BPI)	Gold	400,000^{‡}
^{‡} Sales+streaming figures based on certification alone.
