= The Masterplan (song) =

Single by Oasis
- A-side: "Wonderwall"
- Released: 30 October 1995
- Recorded: September 1995
- Studio: Maison Rouge Studios, London
- Genre: Britpop; baroque pop
- Length: 5:23 (album version); 3:39 (radio edit)
- Label: Creation
- Songwriter: Noel Gallagher
- Producers: Owen Morris; Noel Gallagher

Music video
- "Oasis - The Masterplan" on YouTube

"The Masterplan" is a song by English rock band Oasis. It was written by lead guitarist Noel Gallagher and originally released on 30 October 1995 as a B-side to the single "Wonderwall". Despite its B-side status, it was ranked by The Guardian and The Rolling Stone as one of Oasis' greatest songs.

== Writing and recording ==
The song was written by lead guitarist Noel Gallagher and is sung by Noel and features all band members except lead vocalist Liam Gallagher and Paul "Guigsy" McGuigan (Noel Gallagher plays the bass himself on this track), in addition to an orchestra.

Noel Gallagher has regularly declared "The Masterplan" one of the best songs he has ever written. However, he regrets the fact that it was first released as a B-side, admitting he was "young and stupid" when he made that decision. He also claims that Creation Records boss Alan McGee, upon hearing the song, told Noel it was "too good" to be a B-side. Noel reportedly replied, "Well, I don't write shit songs!". In 2020, he told Music Week, "The singles had to have three B-sides and I was always coming up two songs short. I remember writing The Masterplan at home in Camden and then going to Maison Rouge [Studios] in Fulham the next day and playing it on an acoustic guitar to silence. I'd write The Masterplan, Talk Tonight or Half the World Away and nobody would say, 'Do you want to hold that back?' It's only as the years have gone along that I've realised that was mental. But we were all mad in the '90s – Alan McGee was off his tits and he was running the label."

The song also features a backwards guitar solo after the first chorus. Approximately 30 seconds from the end of the song, Noel can be heard (distortedly) singing the chorus from "Octopus's Garden" by The Beatles.

== Release ==
The song was first released as a B-side to the CD version of "Wonderwall" in October 1995. Its name would be used for the 1998 B-side compilation album, The Masterplan, on which it is featured as the last track.

"The Masterplan" was also included on Oasis' 2006 compilation album Stop the Clocks and the Stop the Clocks EP. A special L. S. Lowry-inspired animated promotional video, complete with a swaggering Liam, was created to promote the album.

The song was performed at the MTV Unplugged concert in August 1996.

== Critical reception ==
In 2024, Paste and Rolling Stone ranked the song number eleven and number eight, respectively, on their lists of the greatest Oasis songs.

== Music video ==
In the animated video, the band walk past Johnny Roadhouse Music, a music shop from which the Gallagher brothers regularly bought equipment at the beginning of their career. It also features on the soundtrack to the Spanish film La Mujer Más Fea del Mundo as well as in an episode of CSI: Miami. It features Maine Road Manchester City’s former ground and where Oasis performed.

== Track listing ==
- German promo CD (HES 4897)
1. "The Masterplan" (radio edit) – 3:39
2. "The Masterplan" (album version) – 5:23

== Personnel ==
- Noel Gallagher – lead and backing vocals, acoustic and electric guitars, bass
- Paul Arthurs – piano
- Alan White – drums, tambourine
- Steve Sidwell, Derek Watkins and John Barclay - trumpets
- Phil Todd and Dave Bishop - tenor saxophones
- Gavyn Wright, Wilf Gibson, Perry Montague Mason and Vaughan Armon - violins
- George Robertson and Bill Hawkes - violas
- Tony Pleeth and Paul Klegg - cellos

== Certifications ==
Region	Certification	Certified units/sales
United Kingdom (BPI)	Platinum	600,000^{‡}
^{‡} Sales+streaming figures based on certification alone.
