= Whatever (Oasis song) =

1994 single by Oasis

Single by Oasis
- B-side: "(It's Good) to Be Free"; "Half the World Away"; "Slide Away"
- Released: 19 December 1994
- Recorded: July 1994
- Studio: Maison Rouge, Chelsea
- Genre: Rock; pop; orchestral pop; pop rock
- Length: 6:21 (single version); 3:58 (radio edit)
- Label: Creation
- Songwriter: Noel Gallagher
- Producers: Owen Morris; Noel Gallagher

Oasis singles chronology
"Cigarettes & Alcohol" (1994)	"Whatever" (1994)	"Rock 'n' Roll Star" (1995)

Music video
- "Whatever" on YouTube

"Whatever" is a song by the English rock band Oasis. Written by the band's lead guitarist Noel Gallagher, it was released on 19 December 1994 by Creation Records as a non-album single. The single was later included on the compilation album Time Flies... 1994–2009. The strings were played by the London Session Orchestra which featured former Electric Light Orchestra violinist Wilfred Gibson.

== Recording ==
The song was recorded in a week-long session at Maison Rouge Studios in Chelsea in July 1994; the session also included "Listen Up", "Fade Away", and a demo of "Some Might Say". The first two days were spent recording the basic track, with the last day being used to record the string sections.

Its main chord progression is G–G/F#–Em7–Dsus4–Cadd9–Dsus4–G–Dsus4.

== Release ==
The Christmas single was released in 1994 as a stand-alone single, bridging the gap between Oasis' debut album, Definitely Maybe, and their second album, (What's the Story) Morning Glory?. "Whatever" has sold 600,000 copies in the United Kingdom as of 2017, receiving a platinum certification from the British Phonographic Industry (BPI). The song re-entered the UK Singles Chart on 20 June 2010 at number 64, due to the release of Time Flies, and was the first time that it had been available to purchase as a music download.

The song was used by Coca-Cola in its 2012 campaign celebrating its 125th anniversary. It was also used in South Korea as the background music for an advertisement for Samsung Life Insurance. In Japan, it was also featured in an advertisement for Asahi Off, a beer product by Asahi Breweries.

== Critical reception ==
Both Melody Maker and NME named 'Whatever' Single of the Week. Melody Maker editor Everett True said the song "is absolutely f***ing stunning — from the strummed acoustic and Rolling Stones-esque sentiments (I'm free to be whatever I...whatever I choose), the f***-off strings and inch-perfect handclaps, right through to the final applause." NME editor Tommy Udo wrote, "'Whatever' is only the best single of 1994, only the best Oasis single of 1994, because I feel reasonably confident that they'll do one better every time. Basically it pisses over everything else. A song to die for, with a descending scale and a f—ing string section: from 'Love Me Do' to 'All You Need Is Love' in under a year. The fact that it sounds like any number of other songs is a mark of the confidence that Oasis have in their songwriting: amateurs borrow, pros steal and look you straight in the eye, unashamed." Music & Media commented, "Anyone who has attended one of their live gigs knows how well they do the Beatles' 'I Am the Walrus'. Backed by a symphony orchestra they now have made their own seaworthy Walrus." Mark Frith from Smash Hits gave the song a full score of five out of five, saying, "They've released this six minute epic complete with violins, sheep noises, hand claps and cheering, undoubtedly with the hope that all their fans will rush out and buy it, making it number one for Xmas." He added, "so, Christmas number three, I'd put money on it."

== Authorship dispute ==
Oasis settled out of court with EMI as the record label claimed that the song borrowed portions of Neil Innes's "How Sweet to Be an Idiot". Innes received a share of the royalties. The portion of the melodic line in question are the eight notes that accompany the lyrics "How Sweet to be an Idiot"/"I'm free to be whatever I" of the Oasis version, appearing 40 seconds after the start of the Innes version.

Innes later made a reference to "Whatever" at the beginning of the song "Shangri-La" by the Rutles, on their 1996 Archaeology album.

== B-sides ==
One of the single's B-sides, "Slide Away", was already featured on their debut album, Definitely Maybe. The other two—"(It's Good) to Be Free" and "Half the World Away"—were later featured on the B-side compilation The Masterplan. "Slide Away" and "Half the World Away" would also be featured on Oasis' 2006 compilation album Stop the Clocks, but "Whatever" itself was not included. "Half the World Away" was chosen as the theme tune to The Royle Family.

== Track listings ==
All tracks were written by Noel Gallagher. (Note: Except "Whatever" written by Gallagher and Neil Innes, and "I Am the Walrus" written by Lennon–McCartney.)

- UK and European single (CD)
1. "Whatever" – 6:21
2. "(It's Good) to Be Free" – 4:18
3. "Half the World Away" – 4:25
4. "Slide Away" – 6:31
- UK single (12-inch)
1. "Whatever" – 6:21
2. "(It's Good) to Be Free" – 4:18
3. "Slide Away" – 6:31
- UK single (cassette, 7-inch)
- French single (CD, 7-inch)
1. "Whatever" – 6:20
2. "(It's Good) to Be Free" – 4:19
- Australian single (cassette)
1. "Whatever" – 6:21
2. "(It's Good) to Be Free" – 4:18
3. "Half the World Away" – 4:25
- Japanese EP (CD)
1. "Whatever" – 6:20
2. "(It's Good) to Be Free" – 4:21
3. "Fade Away" – 4:14
4. "Listen Up" – 6:40
5. "Half the World Away" – 4:23
6. "I Am the Walrus" (live at Glasgow Cathouse, June '94) – 8:16

== Personnel ==
- Liam Gallagher – lead vocals, tambourine
- Noel Gallagher – lead guitar, acoustic guitar, backing vocals
- Paul Arthurs – rhythm guitar, piano
- Paul McGuigan – bass guitar
- Tony McCarroll – drums
- Uncredited – orchestra, handclaps

== Charts ==
=== Weekly charts ===
Chart (1994–1995)	Peak position
Australia (ARIA)	40
Europe (Eurochart Hot 100)	19
Europe (European Hit Radio)	10
Finland (Suomen virallinen lista)	9
France (SNEP)	15
Germany (GfK)	73
Iceland (Íslenski Listinn Topp 40)	3
Ireland (IRMA)	5
Israel (IBA)	10
Italy Airplay (Music & Media)	5
Netherlands (Dutch Top 40 Tipparade)	2
Netherlands (Single Top 100)	48
Scottish Singles Sales (Official Charts)	3
Sweden (Sverigetopplistan)	10
Switzerland (Schweizer Hitparade)	24
UK Singles (Official Charts)	3

Chart (2024–2025)	Peak position
Japan Hot Overseas (Billboard Japan)	11
UK Singles (Official Charts)	36

=== Year-end charts ===
Chart (1994)	Position
UK Singles (OCC)	67

Chart (1995)	Position
Iceland (Íslenski Listinn Topp 40)	18
Israel (IBA)	30
Sweden (Topplistan)	57
UK Singles (OCC)	80

Chart (1996)	Position
UK Singles (OCC)	80

== Certifications ==
Region	Certification	Certified units/sales
United Kingdom (BPI)	2× Platinum	1,200,000^{‡}
^{‡} Sales+streaming figures based on certification alone.

== Release history ==
Region	Date	Format(s)	Label(s)	Ref(s).
United Kingdom	19 December 1994	7-inch vinyl; 12-inch vinyl; CD; cassette	Creation	
Japan	22 December 1994	CD	Epic	
Australia	17 April 1995	CD; cassette	Creation	
