= Acquiesce =

1998 single by Oasis

Promotional single by Oasis

from the album The Masterplan
- A-side: "Some Might Say"
- Released: 12 October 1998 (Note: Released as a promotional single only in North America.)
- Recorded: February 1995
- Studio: Loco (South Wales)
- Genre: Rock; hard rock
- Length: 4:29
- Label: Epic
- Songwriter: Noel Gallagher
- Producers: Owen Morris; Noel Gallagher

Oasis singles chronology
"Don't Go Away" (1998)	"Acquiesce" (1998)	"Go Let It Out" (2000)

Music video
- "Oasis - Acquiesce (Live)" on YouTube

Music video
- "Oasis - Acquiesce" on YouTube

"Acquiesce" is a song by English rock band Oasis, written by Noel Gallagher. The song originally appeared as the B-side to Oasis' first UK number-one single, "Some Might Say", in 1995. It was included on the B-sides compilation album The Masterplan, released in 1998.

== Background ==
Noel Gallagher explained the song's origin in 2006: "It was written going to a studio in Wales to record 'Some Might Say'. The train broke down, and I was stuck for four hours, and I wrote that song. Someone had said 'Acquiesce' on the phone, and I'd written it down". The verses are sung by Liam Gallagher, with the chorus sung by Noel, who said that Liam could not sing the high notes.

Noel Gallagher has said the lyrics are not about him and his brother Liam, a sentiment echoed by Paul Du Noyer in his liner notes of The Masterplan: "The song is about friendship in the widest sense and not, as often speculated, about the Gallagher brothers themselves".

FourFourTwo claimed that in 1995, Oasis was set to record an official song for the football club Manchester City, to be titled "It's Tough Being a Blue When You Come from Where I Do", but this never materialized, and the music was instead used for "Acquiesce".

== Release ==
In October 1998, "Acquiesce" was issued as a radio single in North America to promote the release of The Masterplan. It reached number 24 on the US Billboard Modern Rock Tracks chart, number 20 on the Canadian RPM Alternative 30, and number 44 on the RPM Top Singles chart.

The song was also released as one of the lead tracks to the Stop the Clocks EP, in promotion of their compilation album of which it also appears on, Stop the Clocks.

"Acquiesce" quickly became an Oasis concert staple. Chris True of Allmusic said that the song "arrives with huge guitars and moves with a midtempo swagger and power that are just infectious" and highlights Noel's vocals on the chorus as taking the song to "glorious heights".

"Acquiesce" appeared on the UK Singles Chart for the first time in July 2025, following Oasis' reunion concerts, and peaked at number 17.

== Music video ==
The song's music video is set in Tokyo, though it was filmed in Camden Town, London. It features a Japanese rock band, whose members resemble and share the mannerisms of their Oasis counterparts, performing "Acquiesce" for a frenetic theatre crowd.

== Personnel ==
- Liam Gallagher – lead vocals (verses), tambourine
- Noel Gallagher – lead guitars, acoustic guitar, lead vocals (choruses)
- Paul "Bonehead" Arthurs – rhythm guitar
- Paul "Guigsy" McGuigan – bass
- Tony McCarroll – drums

== Charts ==
Chart (1998)	Peak position
Canada Top Singles (RPM)	44
Canada Rock/Alternative (RPM)	20
US Alternative Airplay (Billboard)	24

Chart (2025)	Peak position
UK Singles (Official Charts)	17

== Certifications ==
Region	Certification	Certified units/sales
United Kingdom (BPI)	Platinum	600,000^{‡}
^{‡} Sales+streaming figures based on certification alone.
