= Tuxedo Junction (music venue) =

Live music venue in Danbury, Connecticut

Coordinates: 41.3960048°N 73.4528926°W

Tuxedo Junction was a 600-capacity live music venue located at 2 Ives Street in Danbury, Connecticut. Ron and Rick Jowdy founded the club in 1985, and sold it in 1998 to Michael Roviello and Al Caccamo, who closed it in 2013. Tuxedo Junction hosted many big-name acts such as Joan Jett, Taylor Dayne, Stephen Stills, 311, Kansas, 38 Special, Blue Öyster Cult, Dark Star Orchestra, Mercyful Fate and Oasis.
