= Tony McCarroll =

English drummer (born 1971)

- Born: Anthony McCarroll; June 4, 1971 (age 55); Levenshulme, Greater Manchester, England
- Genres: Rock; Britpop; alternative rock
- Occupation: Musician
- Instrument: Drums
- Years active: 1991–2000
- Formerly of: Oasis
- Website: tonymccarroll.com

Anthony McCarroll (born 4 June 1971) is an English drummer and one of the founding members of the English rock band Oasis, as their drummer from 1991 until his dismissal in April 1995. He played the drums on their debut studio album, Definitely Maybe, in addition to performing on the singles "Whatever" and "Some Might Say", the latter of which was Oasis's first number-one single from the album (What's the Story) Morning Glory?. In 2026, he was inducted into the Rock and Roll Hall of Fame as a member of Oasis.

== Career ==
=== Oasis ===
McCarroll had met Paul McGuigan while playing for the local football team at a young age. Together with McGuigan's friend Paul Arthurs, they formed a band called the Rain and hired Chris Hutton as their singer, but he was sacked and replaced not long afterwards by Liam Gallagher, whom McCarroll had also known in childhood. Liam decided to change the name of the band to Oasis, inspired by a poster for Inspiral Carpets that was hanging in his room.

Soon afterwards Liam's brother Noel joined the band. McCarroll has stated in his book that he was closely involved in the creation of several of Oasis's songs, including "Supersonic", even though Noel Gallagher was given sole credit as songwriter.

McCaroll was dismissed from Oasis in April 1995 and was replaced by Alan White. Noel Gallagher said, "I like Tony as a geezer, but he wouldn't have been able to drum the new songs."

Oasis producer Owen Morris said of McCarroll, "Tony was quiet and always polite to me, but seemed out of his depth … so I think Tony did well to survive as long as he did in Oasis". Morris described McCarroll's drumming style as "extremely basic", but with timing and tempo that were "almost autistically perfect".

=== Lawsuit against the band ===
In 1999 McCarroll hired solicitor Jens Hills—who had won Pete Best £2 million from the Beatles in 1995—to sue Oasis for £18 million. Arguing that McCarroll was owed his part of the band's five-album deal with Creation, the case hoped to set a legal precedent, as McCarroll would have claimed compensation for two LPs on which he had not played. Eventually, he accepted an out-of-court settlement of £550,000 in March 1999 and agreed to give up future royalties.

== Life after Oasis ==
A 2008 article in Q magazine stated that McCarroll was last seen performing with the band Raika in 2000. His memoir of his time in Oasis, titled Oasis: The Truth, was released in October 2010.

McCarroll was also interviewed for the documentary entitled Oasis: Supersonic in 2016, and the audio was included in the film.

In 2022, McCarroll said the only Oasis concert he attended as a spectator was Oasis's performance at the V Festival, their last show before their initial split in 2009.

== Personal life ==
McCarroll was born in Manchester to Irish parents from Kinnitty, County Offaly and has two children, a daughter and a son.

In August 2021, McCarroll suffered a heart attack, and underwent surgery to insert a coronary stent.
