= Paul McGuigan (musician) =

British retired musician (born 1971)

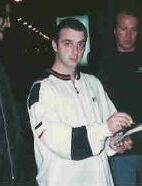
- McGuigan in 1998

Background information
- Also known as: Guigsy; Guigs
- Born: 9 May 1971 (age 55); Manchester, England
- Genres: Britpop; alternative rock
- Occupation: Musician
- Instrument: Bass
- Years active: 1991–2002
- Formerly of: Oasis
- Spouse: Ruth McGuigan (m. 1997)

Paul McGuigan (born 9 May 1971), known as Guigsy (/ˈɡwɪɡzi/ GWIG-zee), is an English retired musician, best known as the original bassist and co-founder of the rock band Oasis.

== Early life ==
McGuigan was born in Manchester, England. He is of Irish Protestant descent and grew up in Levenshulme, Manchester, attending Burnage High School.

== Career ==
In the late 1980s, McGuigan started a band called the Rain with Paul "Bonehead" Arthurs on guitar, Chris Hutton on lead vocals, and Tony McCarroll on drums. After Hutton was fired, McGuigan invited his school friend Liam Gallagher to join on vocals. Liam's brother Noel then joined the band as a guitarist and the primary songwriter, at which point they changed their name to Oasis.

On his simple playing style, McGuigan said in 1995: "When I first started I just played up and down the top string of the bass. Come to think of it, that's what I still do now". The rumour that McGuigan's bass parts were played by Noel Gallagher on Definitely Maybe and (What's the Story) Morning Glory? was dispelled by producer Owen Morris.

McGuigan temporarily left Oasis in August 1995 after the band returned from Japan during their (What's the Story) Morning Glory? Tour, citing a diagnosis of nervous exhaustion. "My body was fucked and my head was gone. Nervous breakdown, whatever you want to call it. The plot got lost," he said. His replacement, Scott McLeod of the Ya Ya's, lasted only a handful of gigs before quitting during an American leg of the tour, citing homesickness. This forced the band to play as a quartet, with Arthurs on bass, for their 19 October 1995 appearance on the Late Show with David Letterman. McGuigan rejoined Oasis before their two concerts at London's Earl's Court in November.

McGuigan left Oasis in 1999, quitting via fax and avoiding phone calls from the band in the following weeks. Noel Gallagher said of McGuigan and the also-exiting Paul Arthurs: "We've got to respect their decision as family men". He was replaced as bassist by Andy Bell. McGuigan's final professional credit came in 2002, playing bass on Cornershop's "Lessons Learned from Rocky I to Rocky III" on the album Handcream for a Generation.

In a 1997 interview, McGuigan said he preferred to stay out of the spotlight: "If people want to knock on my door, I can't stop them, but I'd rather they didn't. I'm happy to play it low-profile". He declined to appear in the 2004 Definitely Maybe DVD documentary, although a polite letter explaining his aversions to interviews and publicity appears as a hidden extra, part of a short segment of Oasis associates giving their views on him. He also declined to appear in the 2016 documentary Oasis: Supersonic, although archive recordings of him were used.

== Personal life ==
McGuigan married his wife Ruth in 1997, and their son Patrick was born later that year. Since leaving Oasis, McGuigan has kept a very low public profile, living with his family in Mill Hill, London. In 2019, Liam Gallagher said he hadn't seen McGuigan since 1999 despite them living "up the road" from each other.

McGuigan is a lifelong supporter of Manchester City FC. In 1996, he told Rolling Stone his hobbies: "Watching football, watching videos about football, reading about football, and talking about football. That's pretty much all I care about". In Oasis: Supersonic, Noel Gallagher quipped that McGuigan's loves were "cricket and Doctor Who, and weed and Man City. I'd say fifth after that was being in Oasis".

In 1997, McGuigan co-wrote a book with journalist Paolo Hewitt about football player Robin Friday, entitled The Greatest Footballer You Never Saw. "The book is not meant to sell thousands of copies and make loads of money," he said. "I just thought it was a story that should be told. That's why there are no pictures of me on the back".

== Discography ==
With Oasis

- Definitely Maybe (1994)
- (What's the Story) Morning Glory? (1995)
- Be Here Now (1997)
- The Masterplan (1998)
