= Paul "Bonehead" Arthurs =

English musician (born 1965)

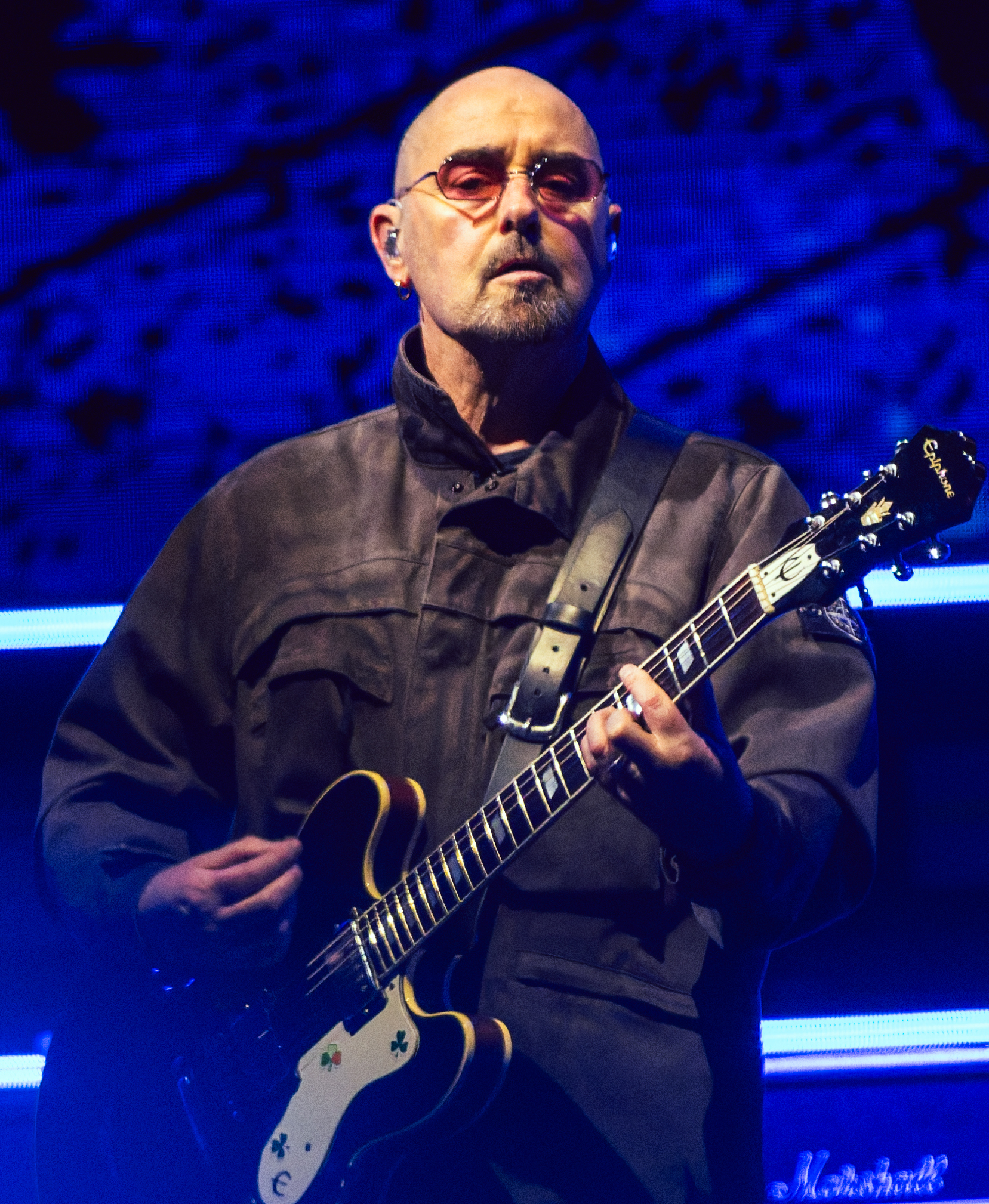
- Arthurs performing with Oasis in September 2025

Background information
- Also known as: Bonehead
- Born: Paul Benjamin Arthurs; 23 June 1965 (age 61); Manchester, England
- Genres: Alternative rock; Britpop; pop rock
- Occupation: Musician
- Instruments: Guitar; keyboards; bass
- Years active: 1991–present
- Member of: Oasis
- Formerly of: Parlour Flames; Phoneys & the Freaks

Paul Benjamin "Bonehead" Arthurs (born 23 June 1965) is an English musician. He is the co-founder and rhythm guitarist of the rock band Oasis. Arthurs played with the band from its inception in 1991 until his departure in 1999, rejoining in 2024 following their reformation.

After Oasis, Arthurs formed Moondog One, released albums as part of two duos, Parlour Flames and Phoneys & the Freaks, and has toured with Oasis offshoot Beady Eye as well as bandmate Liam Gallagher's solo band.

== Early life ==
Arthurs was born in 1965 at Saint Mary's Hospital in Manchester, the son of Irish Catholic parents. He grew up in Longsight until his family moved to Levenshulme at age nine. He went to St. Peter's Roman Catholic Grammar School in the nearby town of Prestwich. He earned the lifelong nickname "Bonehead" at the age of eight after his parents insisted he get very short haircuts. "It was only my mum and dad throughout my life, really, that called me Paul," Arthurs said.

As a youth, Arthurs took lessons on piano and accordion, and learned guitar by borrowing his older brother's model. He left school in 1981 to work as a plasterer, and started his first band, Pleasure and Pain, in 1984. In the late 1980s, while working as a building contractor, he started a band, the Rain, with his friends Paul "Guigsy" McGuigan, Tony McCarroll, and Chris Hutton.

== Career ==
=== Oasis ===
When Hutton was sacked as vocalist, he was replaced by Liam Gallagher, who suggested the band change their name to Oasis. Gallagher and Arthurs teamed up as songwriters, producing songs such as "Life in Vain", "Reminisce", "She Always Came Up Smiling", and "Take Me". (Note: "Take Me", which was recorded only as a demo, was later praised as "great" by Noel Gallagher, who lamented that the band never recorded it for a proper release.) However, the band were still unsuccessful until Liam encouraged his brother Noel, who had just come back from travelling the world as a roadie for Inspiral Carpets, to join the band; the first two songs he presented to the band were "Live Forever" and "All Around the World".

"Bonehead was kind of the glue that held it all together. I would say he was the most forward thinking initially, beause he had been in bands before Oasis. If anything, I would say Bonehead was probably, in the early days, the spirit of Oasis."

— Noel Gallagher in 2015

On his role in Oasis, Arthurs said: "I always used to say to Noel, 'I'll do the rhythm, mate'. He'd say, 'I'm doing these bits. You just do the barre chords'. And no one could do those barre chords or rhythm better than me". He also played keyboards, including piano, Mellotron, and Hammond organ on (What's the Story) Morning Glory? In late 1995, bassist Paul McGuigan briefly left Oasis while suffering from nervous exhaustion, and his replacement, Scott McLeod, quit only a handful of gigs into an American leg of the (What's the Story) Morning Glory? Tour. This forced Oasis to play as a quartet, with Arthurs on bass, for their 19 October 1995 appearance on the Late Show with David Letterman.

Arthurs was originally meant to sing lead vocals on "Bonehead's Bank Holiday", a song included on the vinyl version of (What's the Story) Morning Glory? Arthurs went to the pub to loosen up for the vocal session, but returned so intoxicated and unable to perform that Noel Gallagher's guide vocal remained on the released version. Drunken studio chatter from Arthurs and Liam Gallagher was mixed throughout the song.

Arthurs left the band in 1999, during the recording of Oasis's fourth album, Standing on the Shoulder of Giants. His official statement said he wanted to spend more time with his young family. "Aside from the band, everyone had their own little thing they had to deal with, but no time to deal with it, which sort of made for an atmosphere that wasn't fun anymore," he said. Noel Gallagher initially downplayed Arthurs' departure, saying "it's hardly Paul McCartney leaving the Beatles", though he later said of Arthurs and the also-exiting Paul McGuigan: "We've got to respect their decision as family men". Arthurs was replaced by Gem Archer.

In 2024, it was announced that Arthurs would be rejoining Oasis for their 2025 tour.

=== Post-Oasis ===
In 2001, Arthurs formed Moondog One with Andy Rourke and Mike Joyce of the Smiths, recording several studio tracks before dissolving.

In May 2013, the duo of Arthurs and Vinny Peculiar (Alan Wilkes), dubbed Parlour Flames, released their eponymous album, Arthurs' first since leaving Oasis. Guest musicians included percussionist Che Beresford and brass-player Bob Marsh from Badly Drawn Boy and Anna Zweck from Samson & Delilah on flute and backing vocals.

Arthurs followed his Parlour Flames project up with a new group called Phoneys & the Freaks, started in 2014 with singer/songwriter Alex Lipinski. Their eponymous EP was released in 2014 on Cherry Red Records.

=== Liam Gallagher ===
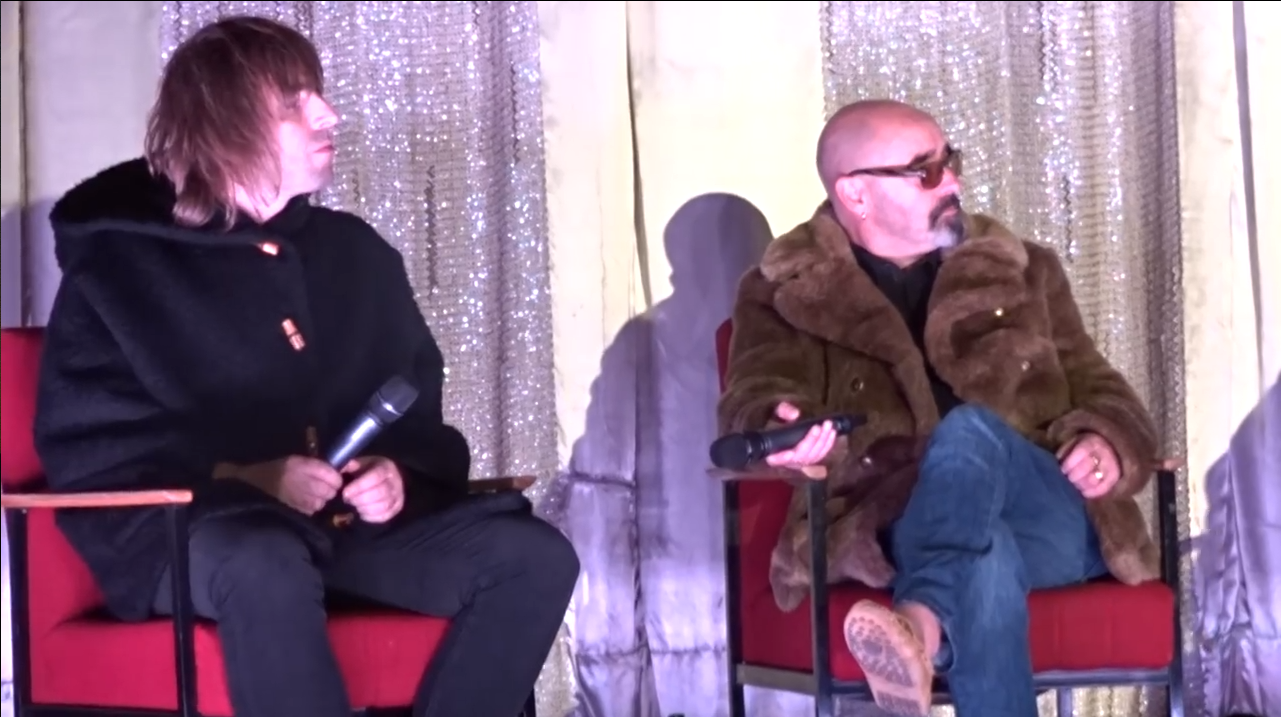
Arthurs (right) with Liam Gallagher at the Berlin premiere of Oasis: Supersonic in 2016

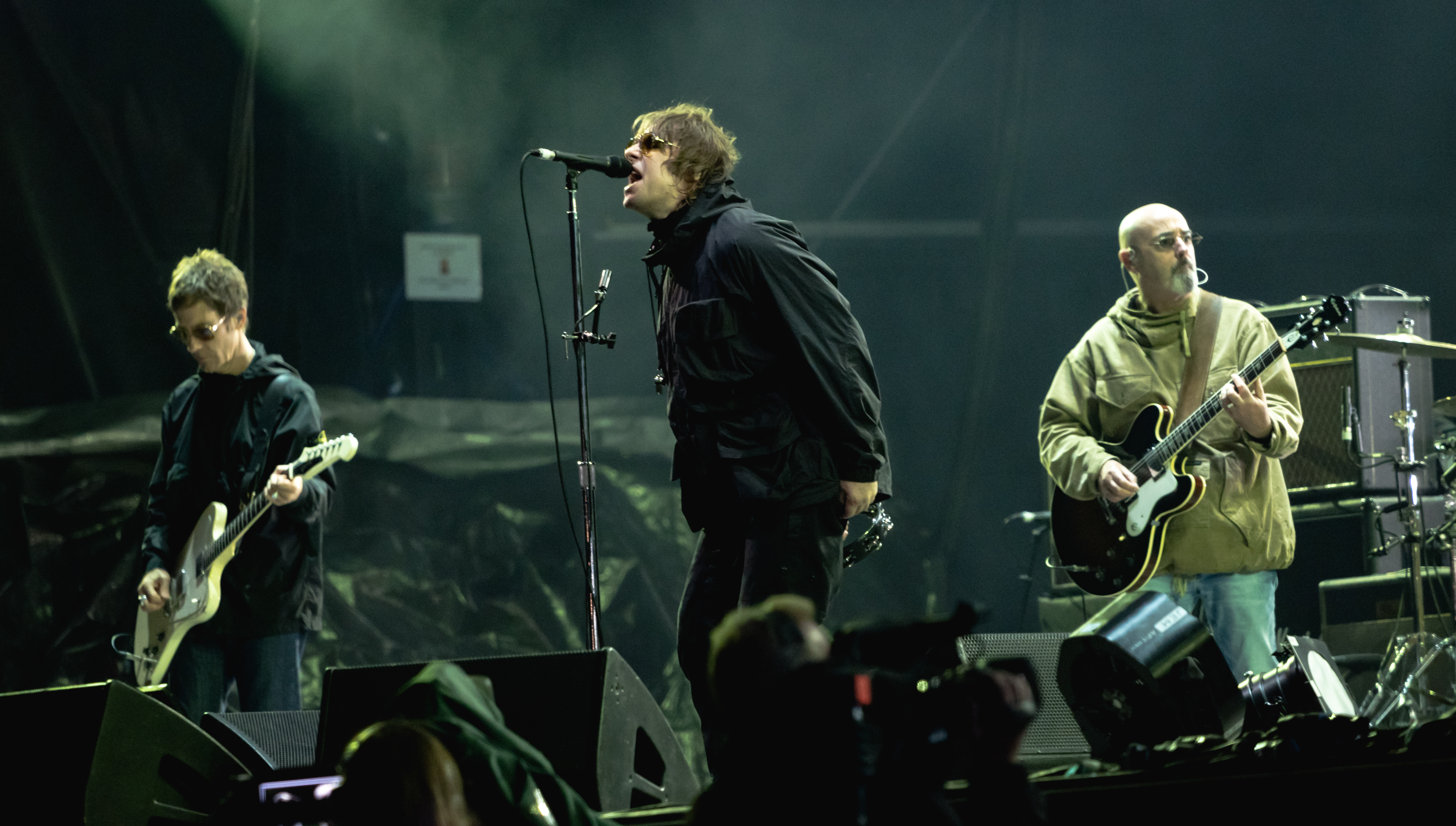
Arthurs (right) performing with Liam Gallagher at the 2021 Reading Festival

In 2013 and 2014, Arthurs performed with Oasis' offshoot Beady Eye, filling in for Gem Archer, who had suffered from a head injury. This led to Arthurs reuniting with Liam Gallagher, playing guitar on the song "Bold" and keyboard on "For What It's Worth" on Gallagher's solo album As You Were. This led to appearances in Gallagher's live backing band from 2017 to 2024, beginning with Gallagher's debut performance at the O2 Ritz in Manchester.

On 22 May 2018, Arthurs performed with Gallagher at the London Stadium as part of Gallagher's support slot for the Rolling Stones. In November 2019, he joined Gallagher to perform Oasis songs during Gallagher's UK and Ireland Why Me, Why Not shows, usually amounting to 10 or 11 songs in a set. In 2020, Arthurs continued to tour with Gallagher, later joining him for a virtual reality concert on 5 December 2020 called "Down by the River Thames".

From 27 to 29 August 2021, Arthurs joined Gallagher to perform his set headlining Reading & Leeds Festivals, playing songs from Gallagher's solo career, as well as Oasis songs. Following a health scare, Arthurs bowed out of Liam's 2022 and 2023 tours, but returned in 2024.

== Equipment ==
Arthurs has used the same 1982 Japanese-made Epiphone Riviera on every Oasis recording and gig throughout his tenure in the band. On the cover of Definitely Maybe, which was shot in Arthurs' living room, the Epiphone is visible propped up against the back wall.

== Personal life ==
Arthurs and his wife Kate are the parents of a daughter and a son. Unlike the Gallagher brothers and McGuigan who are Manchester City supporters, Arthurs is a Manchester United fan.

On 26 April 2022, Arthurs said he had been diagnosed with tonsil cancer and could not join Liam Gallagher on his tour so that he could undergo treatment. On 29 September, Arthurs said he was cancer-free. In October 2025, Arthurs announced he was pulling out of the Asian and Australian legs of the Oasis Live '25 Tour to undergo treatment following a diagnosis of prostate cancer earlier in the year.
