= Nude with Yellow Flower =

Painting by Roy Lichtenstein

- Artist: Roy Lichtenstein
- Year: 1994
- Medium: oil and magna on canvas
- Movement: Pop art
- Dimensions: 233 cm × 183 cm (92 in × 72 in)
- Location: Private collection

Nude with Yellow Flower is a 1994 pop art painting by Roy Lichtenstein. It depicts a nude woman attending the telephone. In 2013, it sold at Christie's for $ 23,643,750.

== See also ==
- 1994 in art
