= The Driver's Seat =

(The) Driver's Seat may refer to:

- Car seat, used by the driver of an automobile
- The Driver's Seat (novel), a 1970 novella by Muriel Spark
- The Driver's Seat (film), a 1974 Italian film based on Spark's novella
- "The Driver's Seat" (The Brady Bunch), a 1974 television episode
- "The Driver's Seat" (Roseanne), a 1993 television episode
- "Driver's Seat", a 1978 song by Sniff 'n' the Tears
- Driver's Seat (sculpture), a 1994 galvanized steel sculpture by Don Merkt

== See also ==
- "Dancin' in the Driver's Seat", a 2018 song by Sonia
- In the Driver's Seat, a 2010 album by Aaron Pritchett
