= Odd Ogg =

Odd Ogg was a toy of the 1960s that was produced by the Ideal Toy Company. The ODD OGG was a half turtle, half frog, and resembled a robotic version of this unique combination. Ideal Toy Company manufactured the ODD OGG in 1962. While ODD OGG might not be as popular as other toys produced by Ideal, such as Kissy doll, Tammy doll, or even the Magic 8 Ball, it is remembered by many baby boomers to this day.

The ODD OGG came with four plastic balls and the objective was for the child to roll them directly into ODD OGG's center. If a child succeeded in doing this, the toy would roll towards them. If a child failed to correctly roll the ball into the underbelly of ODD OGG, then the toy would stick out its tongue and move backwards.
