= 1994 in art =

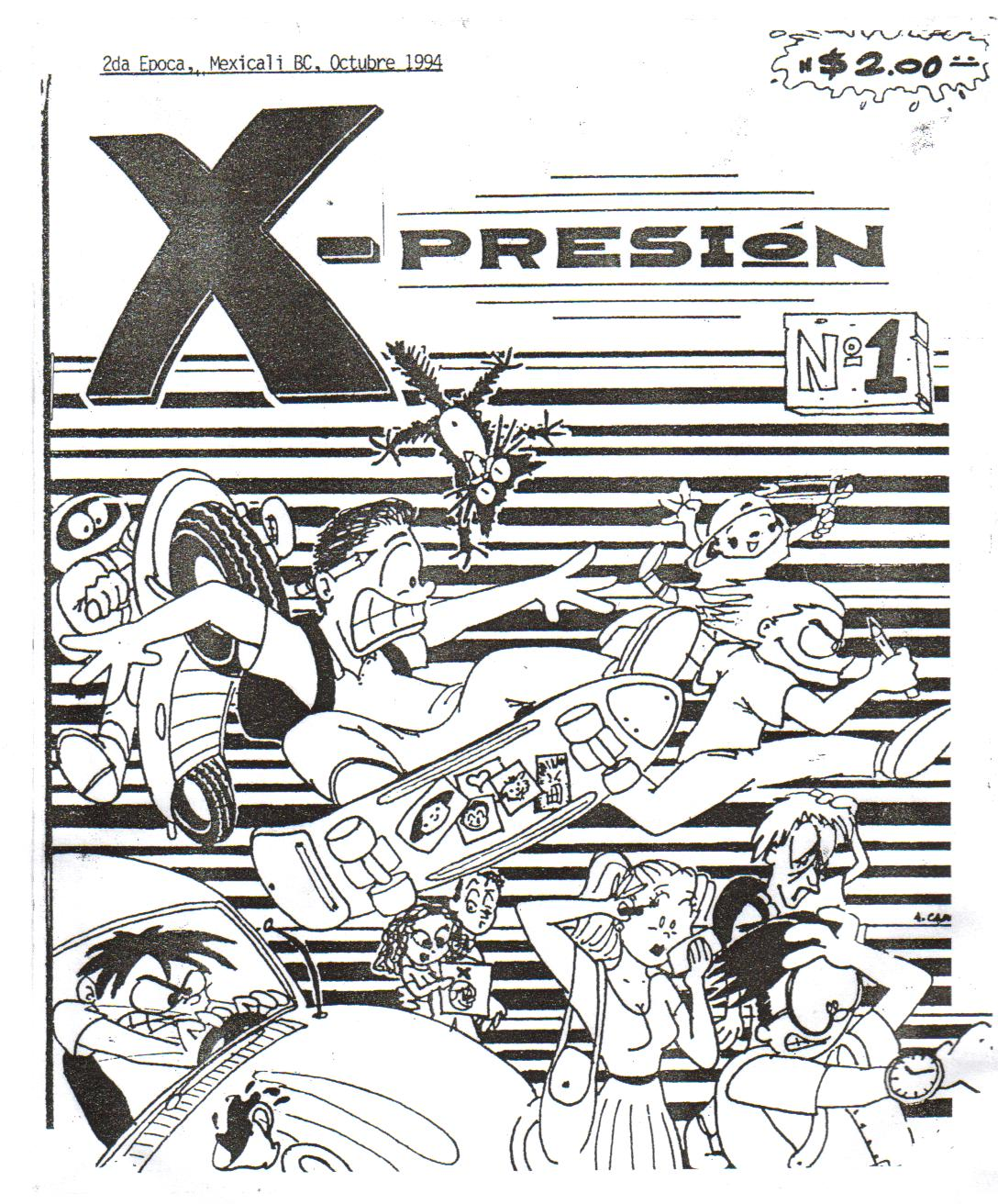
Fanzine created by Armando Camacho.

Events from the year 1994 in art.

== Events ==
- February 12 – Edvard Munch's painting The Scream is stolen, in Oslo (recovered on May 7).
- April 8 – Restoration of the Sistine Chapel frescoes: Michelangelo's The Last Judgment in the Sistine Chapel (Vatican City) is reopened to the public after 10 years of restoration.
- November 26 – The Ministry of Culture and Art in Poland orders exhumation of the presumed grave of absurdist painter, playwright and novelist Stanisław Ignacy Witkiewicz (suicide 1939) in Zakopane. Genetic tests on the remaining bones prove that the body belongs to an unknown woman.

== Awards ==
- Archibald Prize: Francis Giacco – Homage to John Reichard
- Turner Prize: Antony Gormley

== Works ==
- Jake and Dinos Chapman – Great Deeds Against the Dead (sculpture)
- Martin Creed – Work No 88: A sheet of A4 paper crumpled into a ball
- Neil Estern – Statue of Fiorello H. La Guardia (sculpture, New York City)
- Helen Frankenthaler – All About Blue
- Frederick Hart – Statue of Jimmy Carter (sculpture, Atlanta)
- Damien Hirst – Away from the Flock
- Mary Ellen Howe - Pocahontas
- K Foundation – K Foundation Burn a Million Quid (performance art, Jura, Scotland)
- Lee Kelly – Angkor I (sculpture, Lake Oswego, Oregon)
- Sarah Lucas – Au Naturel (assemblage)
- Don Merkt – Driver's Seat (sculpture, Portland, Oregon)
- Odd Nerdrum – Woman Kills Injured Man
- Luis Royo – The Seeds of Nothing
- Rob Turner – Sutton Heritage Mosaic
- Bill Woodrow – In Awe of the Pawnbroker

== Births ==
- July 9 – Akiane Kramarik, American art and poetry prodigy.

== Deaths ==
=== January to June ===
- February 5 – Ben Enwonwu, Nigerian painter and sculptor (b. 1917).
- February 6 – Jack Kirby, American comic book artist, writer and editor (b. 1917).
- February 11 – Max Leognany, French artist (b. 1913).
- February 12 – Donald Judd, American sculptor (b. 1928).
- March 22 – Walter Lantz, American cartoonist and animator (b. 1899).
- April 1 – Robert Doisneau, French photographer (b. 1912).
- April 14 – Jean Joyet, French artist (b. 1919).
- April 27 – Basil Goulandris, Greek shipowner and art collector (b. 1913).
- May 7 – Clement Greenberg, American art critic (b. 1909).
- May 9 – Anni Albers, German American textile artist and printmaker (b. 1899)
- May 12 – Sir Alfred Beit, 2nd Baronet, British politician, art collector and philanthropist and honorary Irish citizen (b. 1903).
- June 15 – Janko Brašić, Serbian painter (b. 1906).

=== July to September ===
- July 3 – Felix Kelly, New Zealand-born British artist (b. 1914).
- July 20 – Paul Delvaux, Belgian painter (b. 1897).
- August 16 – Henry Geldzahler, American museum curator, (b. 1935)
- September – Bruce Ariss, American artist (b. 1911).
- September 23 – Rocco Borella, Italian painter (b. 1920).
- November 4 – Sam Francis, American painter and printmaker (b. 1923).
- November 8 – Marianne Straub, British textile designer (b. 1909).
- November 20 – Umaña, Colombian artist (b. 1908).
- December 31 – Leigh Bowery, Australian performance artist, club promoter, actor, model and fashion designer (b. 1961).

=== Undated ===
- Li Yuan-chia, Chinese-born artist, poet and curator (b. 1929)
