= Tammy (doll) =

Fashion doll created by the Ideal Toy Company

Brand
- Type: fashion doll
- Availability: 1962–1966
- Manufacturer: Ideal Toy Company
- Slogan: The doll you love to dress

Tammy is a 12" fashion doll created by the Ideal Toy Company that debuted at the 1962 International Toy Fair. Advertised as "The Doll You Love to Dress", Tammy was portrayed as a young American teenager, more "girl next door" than the cosmopolitan image of Mattel's Barbie, or American Character Doll Company's Tressy.

== History ==
The doll was loosely based on the character "Tammy" from the 1957 film Tammy and the Bachelor. Tammy was produced in three versions: the first with straight legs, the second released in 1964 with bendable legs, and the final version released in 1965 was an older-looking doll titled "Grown Up Tammy". This doll was also released in an African American version.

In 1965, Tammy's popularity waned and she was discontinued in early 1966.

== Friends and family ==
Dolls released by Ideal that comprised "Tammy's Family" included Mom, Dad, brothers Ted and Pete and sister Pepper. Other "Tammy's Family" companion dolls included Dodi, Salty, Misty, and Montgomery Ward's exclusive Patty and Bud, Tammy's boyfriend, which was produced in small numbers near the time when Ideal ceased production of all Tammy Family dolls.

== Legacy ==
Although production of the Tammy doll was fairly brief, the doll inspired the United Kingdom's bestselling teenage doll, Sindy. Sindy was released in 1963, one year after Tammy, and Pedigree Toys obtained permission to use Tammy's tag line, "The Doll You Love to Dress".

Two conventions have been held in the United States for Tammy collectors.

The doll and its accessories are popular on online auction sites; for example, Tammy's boyfriend Bud sold for $500 on eBay and her original outfits still in their box have sold for $200. However, Tammy did not command the high prices of Barbie – in 2001 a mint Tammy sold on eBay for $90, compared to an early Barbie in similar condition that sold for over $3,000.

In recent years, prices have escalated and Tammy has a big following in Japan. The line of Tammy dolls and outfits, sold exclusively in Japan, now command high prices with American collectors. Tammy in her various formal kimono ensembles reach prices of $300 plus when complete and in mint condition. Brunette dolls, which were produced in smaller quantities, African American dolls and rare outfits such as "Secretary", "On the Avenue" and Tammy's bridal outfit sell for hundreds of dollars.

With the onset success of Tammy dolls, the line has most recently expanded into China. The China line includes various outfits, including the formal slim fitting "Qipao" made of blue satin with black floral print. Another highly popular outfit includes the traditional Chinese Shaolin uniform, available only in orange, representative of the Chinese martial arts of Northern China.
