= Crissy =

Doll

- Ideal Crissy Doll with box, circa 1969
- Type: 18-inch (457.2 mm) doll
- Company: Ideal Toy Company
- Country: United States
- Availability: 1969–1974
- Features: adjustable-length hair

Crissy was an American fashion doll with a feature to adjust the length of its hair. Crissy was created in the Ideal Toy Corporation's prototype department in 1968.

== History and concept ==
The creative idea and realization of a doll that “grows” hair originated not at Ideal Toy Company, but at the American Character Doll Company. The Ideal Corporation obtained the patents for the basic mechanism when they acquired them from the American Character Doll Company after that company's 1968 closure. American Character developed and used the concept as early as 1963 in their "Pre-Teen" Tressy, and later fashion dolls Tressy and Cricket. The patent for a grow hair mechanism awarded to Ideal in 1971 and attributed to inventors Francis Amici, Robert David, and Richard Levine is scarcely different from the original invention used in the 1963 Tressy doll.

=== Operation ===
With the Crissy doll's hair fully or partially extended, turning a knob located on the doll's back retracts the hair into the torso to be wound on an internal rod or spindle. The design of the knob and the body mold form a one-way ratchet which along with internal spring tension serves to hold the hair locked and stationary. Pushing and holding in a button on the doll's abdomen disengages the locking ratchet to allow the hair to be pulled back out of the Doll's Head. From a child's perspective this ability to “grow” hair was the Crissy doll's main appeal, as in play, Crissy had the potential to sport various types of hairstyles by adjusting the hair to different lengths and styling the hair appropriately.

== Marketing and production models ==
After the New York Toy Fair in 1969, Ideal's "Beautiful Crissy" was released to the buying public. Each production year enjoyed some new variations. Production runs of the Crissy doll early in 1969 had adjustable hair that "grew" down to the doll's feet. Later production Crissy dolls in 1969 had hair extending only to hip length. This became the standard length for the later models produced in the following years. Hair quality of both these early dolls tended to be of a coarser or wooly quality than subsequent models.

=== Development and innovation ===
The 1970 model of the Crissy doll had better hair quality, a new aqua mini-dress, and a new box design to depict her attire. Despite these minor alterations, the 1970 Crissy was basically the same doll. The greatest landmark of 1970 is that Crissy was joined by a companion doll, Crissy's shorter 15 inch (380 mm) cousin Velvet. With popularity of the doll increasing accompanied by rising sales, beginning in 1971, Ideal took the initiative to modify their ever-growing Crissy line of dolls. Not only were new models added to the expanding family, but by using new designs and mechanical gimmickry the dolls started "doing things."

==== Movin' Groovin' Crissy ====
The 1971 "Movin' Groovin'" model in her orange jersey mini-dress and orange boots had a swivel-jointed waist. This feature enhanced play value by making the doll more agile and lifelike. This issue is often confused with the "Look Around Crissy" model released in 1972. This doll, who came wearing a jewel-toned taffeta floor-length gown, was different from previous Crissy models as it employed a mechanical apparatus, set in motion by pulling a pull-string. Once again, Ideal's efforts were directed to create a more lifelike doll as "Look Around Crissy" doll's head and waist were geared to turn and give the impression of "looking around" when the doll's string was pulled.

The 1971-73 "Talky Crissy" could play back pre-recorded messages or phrases.

==== Beautiful Crissy with the Swirla-Curler ====
In 1973 Ideal released "Beautiful Crissy with the Swirla-Curler.” This doll came packaged with a hair curling attachment designed to be inserted into the head's opening. This Crissy model came wearing a one-piece dress that was fashioned to look like a white-and-orange plaid jumper with a red-orange blouse underneath.

==== Beautiful Crissy with Twirly Beads ====
The final release of the standard "grow hair" Crissy dolls designed with the aforementioned "button and knob" method of adjusting the hair length came in 1974. This was "Beautiful Crissy with Twirly Beads". She came with a wired hair accessory that resembled two strands of pink and white beads, and she wore a floor-length gown of pink gingham. All production models of the Crissy and Velvet dolls, except for "Talky Crissy" & "Talky Velvet", also had an African-American version doll. The Crissy doll enjoyed immense popularity for over six years. Remaining stock was sold right up through 1975.

== Friends and family ==
=== Gorgeous Tressy ===
In 1970 Ideal produced another 18-inch (460 mm) tall doll which shared the adjustable hair feature. This doll, named "Gorgeous Tressy", was a Sears catalog exclusive. In 1971 "Posin' Tressy" also a Sears catalog exclusive was issued. These Tressy dolls are considered by some collectors as Crissy "family" dolls.

=== Kerry ===
Also in 1971 Ideal released the Crissy "friend" doll, 18 inch (460 mm) tall "Kerry" who was marketed as Beautiful Crissy’s Friend. The Kerry doll has blonde hair and green eyes and was only released in a straight body style. Next came "Brandi" (1972–73) also 18 inch and marketed as a friend/companion doll. The Brandi doll had tanned skin, blonde hair and painted blue eyes. Brandi was only released with a Posin’ body style, meaning the doll had a swivel waist that had limited movement in both the horizontal and vertical planes so the doll could strike various poses for the child at play.

=== Velvet ===
Additionally, "Crissy's Cousin, Velvet," was recreated yearly in several issues from 1970 through 1974, all of which corresponded with the Crissy issues by year. She was also reissued in 1981. Velvet was a 15-inch tall and was released in Caucasian and African American versions. The white Velvet Doll had blonde hair and lavender sleep eyes, while the black Velvet version had black hair and black sleep eyes. "Crissy's Cousin", Velvet had two 15 inch (380 mm) tall friends, "Mia" (1971) and "Dina" (1972–73). The Mia Doll had brunette hair and blue sleep eyes. Mia was only released in a straight body style. The Dina Doll had a tan, blonde hair and painted blue eyes and was only released with a Posin’ body style. Also considered by some collectors as a Crissy "family" doll was "Posin' Cricket" a 1971 Sears catalog exclusive.

=== Velvet's Little Sister, Cinnamon ===
Crissy's smallest cousin was “Velvet's Little Sister” (1972) a 12-inch (300 mm) strawberry blonde child doll. This issue was a Caucasian only doll. In 1973, this doll was released again, but with her own name and new accessories. She was "Cinnamon with a Hairdoodler." In 1974, “Cinnamon with the New Curly Ribbons” was released. The 1973 and 1974 Cinnamon dolls were also created in an African-American version.

=== Baby Crissy ===
One of the other members of the Crissy family of dolls was "Baby Crissy," a large 24 inch (610 mm) doll with adjustable length hair controlled by a simple pull-string. "Baby Crissy" was the size of a nine-month-old which is why to this day, many of these "Baby Crissy" dolls can be found wearing real baby clothes. A “Baby Velvet” doll was a proposed model that was pictured in Ideal's 1974 catalog but never made it to the production stage.

"Baby Crissy" enjoyed huge popularity for many years. The first five years of this doll's production (1973–1977) brought to the buying public the same doll, wearing three different versions of her diaper set- a short dress with matching bloomer-type panties. She was sold barefoot. The doll was recreated and sold again in 1981 and 1982 with exactly the same molds used in the 70's, though dressed in a completely different outfit, again with no shoes, and housed in several differently styled boxes. More dolls that looked totally different were sold with the same name in 1984 and 1985 (by the Ideal Toy Corporation) and again in 1991 (by the View-Master Ideal Group, Inc.) and also in 1995 (created by Tyco Playtime, Inc.).

=== Tara ===
In 1976, Ideal produced a new growing hair doll named "Tara." This doll's face mold had more realistic and ethnically correct African-American features. Although she was marketed much later than any of the other Ideal growing hair dolls, "Tara" was made with the same body, arm and leg molds as the Velvet doll. Tara is considered by some collectors as part of the Crissy "family" of dolls.
