= Super City (toy) =

Construction toy produced by Ideal Toys

The Super City toy is a construction set produced by Ideal Toys in 1967. It is similar to Lego, small plastic pieces which are assembled to create complex structures. However Super City is more oriented to buildings and allows more sophisticated constructions. Children could build skyscrapers, research laboratories and pharmaceutical factories.

Super City is made of plastic frames which connect at the edges with grooves and studs into which fit a variety of wall panels. Frames can be connected at right angles by grooved and flanged columns. Frames are primarily square with some rectangles (half squares) and triangles (diagonally halved rectangles). The inserts are mostly wall finishes in either thin textured and coloured opaque plastic or windows in coloured (and sometimes textured) transparent plastic. There are a few card inserts, generally with printed signs. In addition there are a variety of special inserts and frames including shop windows, bow window, house door with pillars, clock, flag pole, garage door and revolving doors. There are also balconies and canopies. Other cardboard parts include helicopter pads and "building extenders". Roofs are generally intended to be flat (some of the plastic inserts are domed or pyramidal roof lights and panels) but card roofs are supplied for more domestic buildings.

However Super City proved too complicated for young children, and it was almost impossible for small fingers to work with. It was progressively removed from market from 1968.

Douglas Coupland said about Super City: "anything made from Super City looked like a Craig Ellwood, or a Neutra or a Wallace K. Harrison". He also stated that Super City was "the best building kit ever made, possibly even better than Lego".
