= Statue of Fiorello H. La Guardia =

Statue in Manhattan, New York, U.S.

- Artist: Neil Estern
- Year: 2002
- Type: Sculpture
- Subject: Fiorello H. La Guardia
- Location: New York City, New York, U.S.; 40°43′43.22″N 73°59′53.53″W

An outdoor 1994 sculpture of Fiorello La Guardia by Neil Estern was installed in Greenwich Village, New York City, in LaGuardia Gardens, which is located at 547 LaGuardia Place between Bleecker and W. 3rd Street.

== See also ==
- 1994 in art
