= Playpal =

Doll line

Patti Playpal
- Type: Doll
- Invented by: Neil Estern
- Company: Ideal Toy Company; Ashton-Drake Galleries; Danbury Mint
- Country: United States
- Availability: 1959-62; 1981–2003

Patti Playpal, also spelled as Patti Play Pal, was an American line of dolls created by both Neil Estern and Vincent DeFilippo (creator of the "baby face" sculpt Patti) both versions were produced by the Ideal Toy Company during the late 1950s to early 1960s. The dolls head, arms, legs and torso are made from vinyl. The process used for the torso and legs is known as blow molding.

A main selling point of the dolls was their size. At 35 inches (89 cm) they were made and marketed as "companion dolls" to children, and thus are able to share clothing and play with its owner as if it were a real child.

== Variants and similar dolls ==
Besides the original Patti Playpal doll, several variants were also released (a "walking" version and the non-walking version). The doll line had "family members" which included: 32 inches (81 cm) Penny, 32 inches (81 cm) Saucy Walker who also was sold in a 28 inch version, 28 inches (71 cm) Suzy, 24 inches (61 cm) Bonnie, 24 inches (61 cm) Johnny and the 38 inches (97 cm) Peter. A related line, the 38 inches (97 cm) and 42 inches (110 cm) Daddy's Girl dolls, were also released around the same time, representing a 12-year old girl. Special editions, including Playpals modeled after child actresses Shirley Temple and Lori Martin, were also produced.

Owing to the popularity of the line, similar companion dolls and counterfeits were made and marketed by other companies under different names, such as those from Allied Eastern, Sayco, Madame Alexander and numerous other manufacturers.

== Legacy ==
The line was briefly revived in the 1980s with new dolls, among them an African-American Playpal, and in the 2000s by Ashton-Drake Galleries and Danbury Mint, who released a reproduction of the Shirley Temple Playpal doll.
