= Flatsy doll =

Flat dolls made by Ideal Toy Company

Flatsy Doll
- Type: posable flat doll
- Invented by: Hank Kramer
- Company: Ideal Toy Company
- Country: United States
- Availability: 1969–1973
- Materials: vinyl with interior wires
- Features: 3 sizes (Mini, Medium, Fashion)

Flatsy Dolls are flat dolls that were made by Ideal Toy Company from 1969 through 1973. Designed by Hank Kramer, Flatsy Dolls were originally marketed to little girls. Like many vintage dolls, Flatsy dolls are now collector's items.

== Description ==
Flatsys have long hair, which goes to the floor, generally in vivid colors (like bright blue, bright yellow, pink, etc.). They are made of soft vinyl with wires inside the limbs, neck, and body, which make them posable. Their faces have sweet, grinning expressions with eyes looking either to the left or to the right.

The packaging the Flatsy doll is sold in can be used as a decorative picture frame, and the doll is also possible to wear as a pin. In 1969 when Flatsy retailed for $3 Corpus Christi Times described it as "reasonably priced".

Each Flatsy has a "theme" and comes with an accessory and a cardboard liner with a picture in keeping with that theme. They also have a plastic clip to hold the doll in place on the liner card, which also detached for play time.

Commercials for Flatsys featured the theme song: "She's Flat and All That!."

Flats Dolls wear "mod" clothes reflecting the styles of the 1960s. Every Flatsy came with shoes and, in nearly every case, a hat.

== Sizes ==
Flatsys were made in three sizes:

- Mini – c. 2 1/2 inches tall
- Medium – c. 5 inches tall
- Fashion – c. 8 1/2 inches tall

The Minis and Mediums are very similar in appearance (except of course for size), while the Fashions are very tall, thin, and have rooted eyelashes.

== Series ==
=== Mini Flatsies ===
==== 4 Seasons ====
Winter, Spring, Summer, Fall- were available in a triple frame with three dolls with clothing and accessories to fit each season. Dolls were also sold separately in a small Locket shaped frame.

==== Play sets ====
Flowertime, Munchtime, Schooltime, Playtime, Slumbertime- sets of two dolls with an accessory or vehicle to match their theme.

=== Medium Flatsies ===
==== House Series ====
Bonnie, Candy, Casey, Cookie, Dewie, Filly, Judy, Nancy, Rally, Sandy, Suzie and Trixie- each were available in a picture frame that included accessories to match their specific theme and were also sold separately in a smaller locket shaped frame.

==== Candy Mountain Series ====
Soda Fizz sold with the Candy Mountain track. Scoop, Creamy and Cornball sold separately, each with their own car.

==== Flatsyville Series ====
Carrie, Grandma Baker, Keely, Kookie, Munchie, Nana, Shaina and Sleepy each sold in their own house shaped frame with accessories.

==== Sisters ====
Holiday Time, Play Time, Treat Time, and Sleepy Time- sets of one medium sized Flatsy and one Baby Flatsy sister.

==== Spinderella Flatsy ====
Blue, Green, Pink or Yellow- came atop a base that spun when you pulled the string.

=== Fashion Flatsies ===
Ali, Cory, Dale and Gwen- each available with one of three different outfits in a large frame or small box.

== Flatsy Homes ==
=== Flatsy Townhouse ===
A tall multifloor home with furniture.

=== Flatsy Modern House ===
A one story house with a bedroom loft area with furniture.

=== Flatsy at Home ===
A flat foldable house that opened into a bedroom.

== Markings on a genuine Flatsy ==
In order to verify a genuine Flatsy, the Ideal Toy Company branded each one in the back with an oval shape that has the word "Ideal" in it. Below it are the words "©1969 Pat. Pend. Hong Kong." Any variation of this brand indicates a counterfeit or "knock-off". Also, Flatsy's hair is not rooted in the back of head, only on the top. Clones include the Pamela Doll and Linda Doll.

== Reproductions ==
Flatsies were reintroduced in 1994 by Just Toys in a size similar to the original mini Flatsies, then again in 2008 by Schylling in a size more similar to the medium Flatsies.
