= No Way Sis =

Scottish Oasis tribute band

- Origin: Glasgow, Scotland
- Genres: Rock, tribute band
- Past members: Gerry McKay, Joe McKay

No Way Sis were the official Oasis tribute band originating from Glasgow, Scotland.

The band had a Top 40 hit single in the UK in 1996 with their EP I'd Like to Teach the World to Sing, the title track being a cover of the New Seekers song made famous from its use on Coca-Cola advertisements in the 1970s. Oasis's unlicensed use of the tune from the original in their 1994 single "Shakermaker" led to their being successfully sued by The New Seekers. One of the B-sides—"The Quick Sand Song"—was a reference to Oasis'instrumental piece "The Swamp Song".

Oasis's lead guitarist Noel Gallagher heralded No Way Sis as the "second-best band in the world", and he presented his doppelgänger Gerry McKay with the golden Gibson Les Paul guitar he played while recording "Some Might Say".

Between 1995 and 1998, No Way Sis toured the UK and Europe, as well as performing a string of dates in the United Arab Emirates.

As the hysteria surrounding Oasis died down towards the end of the 1990s, the demand for No Way Sis decreased, and they split.

== Discography ==
=== I'd Like to Teach the World to Sing (1996) ===
A UK #27 on 21 December 1996.

- "I'd Like to Teach the World to Sing"
- "The Quick Sand Song"
- "Good Times"
- "I'd Like to Teach the World to Sing (instrumental version)"
