= John F. Kennedy Memorial (Brooklyn) =

Sculpture of John F. Kennedy in Brooklyn, New York, U.S.

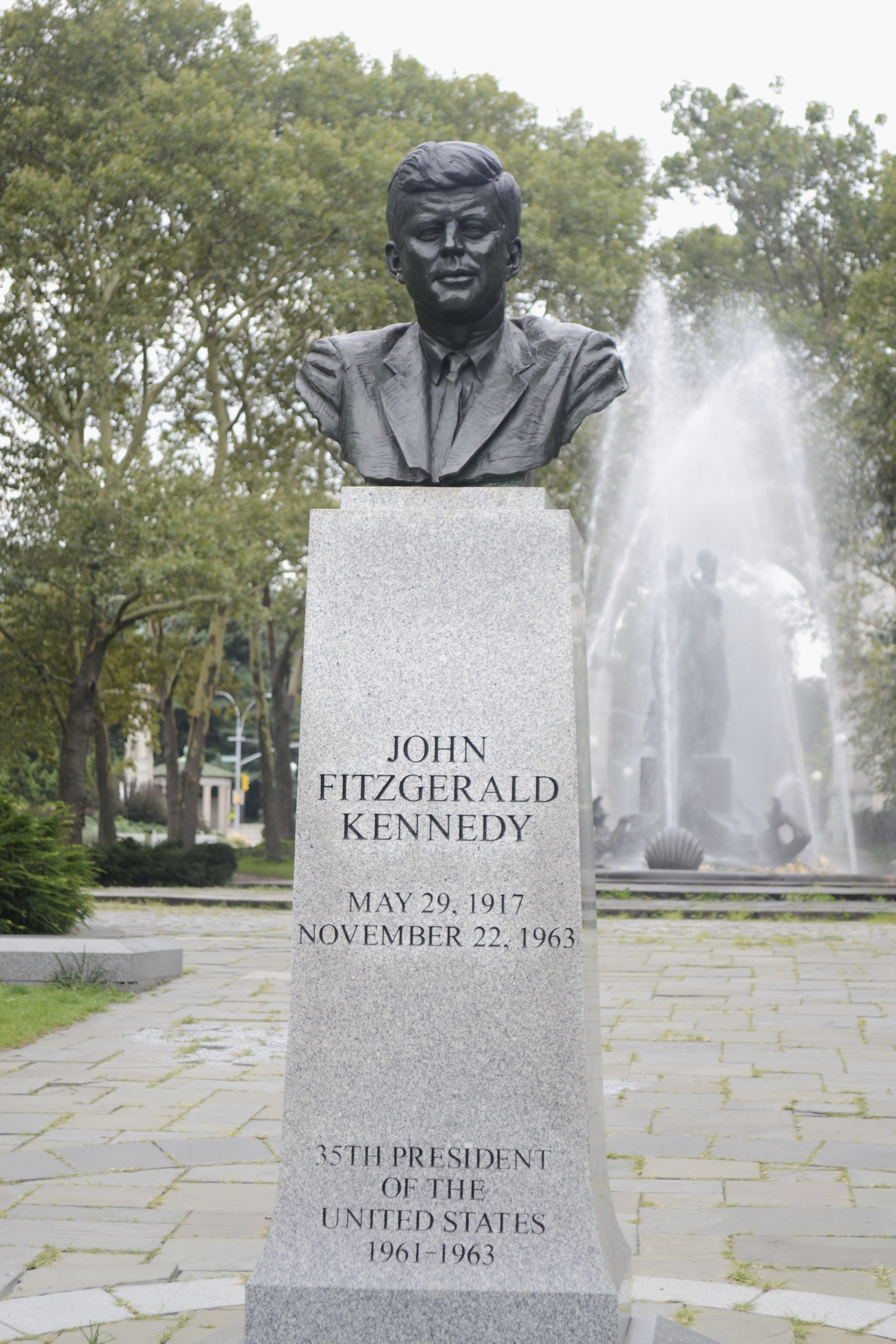
- The memorial in 2017
- Artist: Neil Estern
- Subject: John F. Kennedy
- Location: New York City, New York, U.S.; 40.674269°N 73.970177°W

The John F. Kennedy Memorial by Neil Estern is installed in Brooklyn's Grand Army Plaza, in the U.S. state of New York. It features a bronze bust of John F. Kennedy on a Regal Grey granite pedestal. The current monument was dedicated on August 24, 2010, which replaced one previously dedicated on May 31, 1965.

== See also ==
- List of memorials to John F. Kennedy
- Cultural depictions of John F. Kennedy
