= Betsy Wetsy =

Toy doll

- Type: Drink-and-wet doll
- Company: Ideal Toy Company
- Country: United States
- Availability: 1934–1980s
- Features: "Wetting"; Sleep eyes Jointed limbs

Betsy Wetsy was a "drink-and-wet" doll originally issued by the Ideal Toy Company of New York in 1934. It was one of the most popular dolls of its kind in the Post–World War II baby boom era.

Named for the daughter of Abraham Katz, the head of the company, the doll's special feature was simulating urination after a fluid was poured into her open mouth. Betsy Wetsy was also one of the first major dolls to be produced in African American versions.

== Description ==
Betsy Wetsy was produced with either molded plastic hair, karakul wigs, or brown, blonde, or red plugged hair. It had blue sleep eyes with eyelashes and its arms and legs were jointed. A layette, baby bottles, a plastic bath tub, and other accessories were available.

== History ==
Effanbee had previously manufactured a similar doll, "Dy-dee," and a patent infringement lawsuit resulted. The judge ruled that drinking and urinating are natural movements and cannot be patented.

The doll was made in several sizes in the 1940s. It saw a spike in popularity in the 1950s.

A made-in-China version was issued in the late 1980s by Ideal to boost sales, but the doll never reached the success of the original.

== Other media ==
=== Film ===
Plans for a live-action film adaptation produced by Mattel Films and Aggregate Films were announced in January 2022.

== Legacy ==
In 2003, the Toy Industry Association named Betsy Wetsy to its Century of Toys List, a compilation commemorating the 100 most memorable and most creative toys of the 20th century.
