= The Game of Jaws =

Board game

The Game of Jaws is a 1975 game produced by the Ideal Toy Company. The game is based on the blockbuster film of the same name. Today, the game is rare and is a valuable collector's item. Jaws features a plastic great white shark, as well as 13 junk pieces. The junk pieces are things like tires, human skulls, etc. The game was also released as "Sharky's Diner" many years later. Despite being based on the mature-oriented horror film, the game’s age range was initially 6+ and later changed to 4+. It was remade by the National Entertainment Collectibles Association in 2025 for the film’s 50th anniversary with a more film accurate shark and pieces.

== Gameplay ==
The players put all the junk pieces in the shark's mouth. The weight of the pieces keeps the mouth open. Using a gaff hook, each player then attempts to remove a junk piece from the shark's opened mouth. The first player to successfully remove four junk pieces wins. However, if a player takes a wrong move, the shark's mouth will snap shut. If only two players are playing, the final player to successfully remove five junk pieces wins.

In the 2025 remake of the game by NECA, the shark's mouth is triggered by pressure on its basihyal (similar to a tongue), so if a player presses down onto this part while fishing out the junk pieces, the jaws snap shut.
