= Neil Estern =

American sculptor (1926–2019)

- Born: Neil Carl Estern; April 18, 1926; Brooklyn, New York
- Died: July 11, 2019 (aged 93); Sharon, Connecticut
- Education: Temple University (BFA & BS, education, 1948)
- Occupation: Sculptor

Neil Carl Estern (April 18, 1926 – July 11, 2019) was an American sculptor. Known for his public monuments, Estern's best-known works are his sculptures of Franklin D. Roosevelt, Eleanor Roosevelt, and Fala at the Franklin Delano Roosevelt Memorial in Washington. Estern was also the creator of the doll Patti Playpal.

== Early life ==
Neil Carl Estern was born on April 18, 1926, in Brooklyn, New York to Marc J. and Molly (née Sylbert) Estern. He was interested in sculpting from a young age, playing with clay as a child. Raised in Flatbush, he graduated from the High School of Industrial Art. In 1948, Estern graduated from Temple University's Tyler School of Fine Arts with a BS in education and a BFA. He also studied at the Barnes Foundation and spent time at a foundry in Pietrasanta, Italy.

== Career ==
Estern began as a toymaker, developing the Patti Playpal doll for Ideal Toy Company. He modeled the heads and arms, and his wife Anne designed the wardrobes and worked on the overall concepts.

For much of his career, Estern worked out of a studio in Brooklyn Heights, commonly working in bronze. He also created sculptures of Jimmy Carter (Time, August 18, 1980), J. Edgar Hoover (Life, April 9, 1971), and Princess Diana for covers of Time and Life.

His sculpture of John F. Kennedy in Prospect Park was originally erected on May 31, 1965, on a marble base: Estern's first commissioned monument. Robert F. Kennedy officially unveiled the sculpture. Plaza renovations were started in 2002, and the statue was removed later on October 6, 2003. After small tweaks by Estern, it was re-dedicated in 2010, this time on a granite base as originally intended by Estern, who said that "[m]arble is a very soft material, very rarely used for monuments".

Estern designed the medal for the Raymond E. Baldwin Medal, first awarded in 1981. The 2.5-inch medal is bronze, with the Great Seal of Wesleyan University on one side and Judge Raymond E. Baldwin on the other.

In 1990, Estern recreated three bronze plaques for the restoration of the Sedgwick Memorial at Cornwall Hollow, Connecticut, which had been vandalized the previous year.

Perhaps Estern's best-known work is at the Franklin Delano Roosevelt Memorial, which took decades to complete from inception to dedication. After working on them for over a decade, Estern created three sculptures which are in room 3 of the memorial: Franklin D. Roosevelt, Eleanor Roosevelt, and Fala. Controversially, the nine-foot-tall President Roosevelt figure is depicted sitting in a wheelchair.

In 2002, the statue of Fiorello H. La Guardia was unveiled in Greenwich Village, New York. Estern had been selected to create the monument years earlier, in 1988. LaGuardia is depicted mid-stride by Estern, who spoke positively about the reception to his choice, saying "I got letters from people in all parts of the country who said, 'That's La Guardia.'" Estern based the work on "many, many still photographs and also the frame-by-frame study of many newsreels".

Estern twice served as president of the National Sculpture Society, once from 1994 to January 1997, and again from 2005 to 2007. He was also a member of the Century Association and the Rembrandt Club.

== Personal life and death ==
In 1948, Estern married Anne Graham; the couple had three children, two sons, Peter Estern and Evan Estern, and a daughter, film director Victoria "Tory" Estern Jadow. The Esterns moved to a four-story townhouse on Remsen Street in Brooklyn Heights in 1958.

In his retirement, Estern lived in West Cornwall, Connecticut. On July 11, 2019, Estern died in Sharon, Connecticut, of renal failure.

== Selected works ==
- Bronze relief of Irving Berlin, Music Box Theater, Manhattan, New York; National Portrait Gallery, Washington
- Statue of Fiorello H. La Guardia (2002), Greenwich Village, Manhattan, New York
- 100th Anniversary Plaque (bronze) featuring Frederick Law Olmsted and Calvert Vaux (1966), Prospect Park, Brooklyn, New York
- John F. Kennedy Memorial (1965), Grand Army Plaza, Brooklyn, New York
- Sculpture of Eleanor Roosevelt, National Cathedral, Washington
- Sculpture of Senator Claude Pepper (2003), Pepper Museum, Tallahassee, Florida
- Expulsion From Paradise (1962), Brooklyn Museum

== Awards ==
- Mildred Vincent Prize, National Sculpture Society, 1992
- Greenwich Village Society for Historic Preservation Award (Fiorello H. La Guardia), 1996
- Daniel Chester French Award, National Academy, 1997
- Maynard Award, National Academy, 1999
- Medal of Honor, National Sculpture Society, 2008
