= I Vant to Bite Your Finger =

Board game

- Box cover of first British edition (Ideal, 1979)
- Designers: Charles Phillips; Charlie Leicht
- Publishers: Ideal Toy Company (UK); Hasbro (US)
- Publication: 1979
- Genres: Children's board game

I Vant to Bite Your Finger is a children's board game published by Ideal Toys in collaboration with Hasbro in 1979 in which players must avoid having their finger bitten by a vampire in order to progress.

== Description ==
I Vant to Bite Your Finger is a board game for 2–4 players. The game board shows a path marked through a graveyard marked by 14 red circles. A large plastic depiction of Dracula and a clock stand at the end of the game board.

Each player receives a token. The first player moves their token any number of circles forward, and then moves the clock hand forward by the same number of clicks. The more spaces the player chooses to move, the more clicks the clock receives, and the more chance Dracula will manifest by raising his cloak to reveal his mouth. If Dracula's cloak does not open, the player's token is allowed to stay where it landed. If Dracula's cloak does open, the player must put a finger in Dracula's mouth while another player operates the biting mechanism. If the player's finger is unmarked, the player's token remains where it landed; but if the player's finger is marked by two red dots (washable ink from two small markers) then the player must move their token back to the start. Play continues around the table.

The first player to make it through the graveyard is the winner.

== Publication history ==
I Vant to Bite Your Finger was designed by Charles Phillips and Charlie Leicht, and was published by Ideal Toy Company in the UK in 1979, and by Hasbro in North America the same year (with a different box cover).

== Reception ==
In Toy Wars, Miller G. Wayne called this game an embarrassing failure for Hasbro as it struggled in the 1970s to emulate the success of other game companies.

In Christmas Dodos: Festive Things on the Verge of Extinction, Steve Stack noted that Ideal Toy Company "was responsible for many of the best-selling toys and games of the '60s, '70s and '80s", and gave I Vant to Bite Your Finger as an example. Stack rated this game as 4 out of 5 dodos, indicating it was very difficult to find, and concluded, "Twilight fans should demand it make a comeback."
