= Shaker Maker =

Toy for making figurines

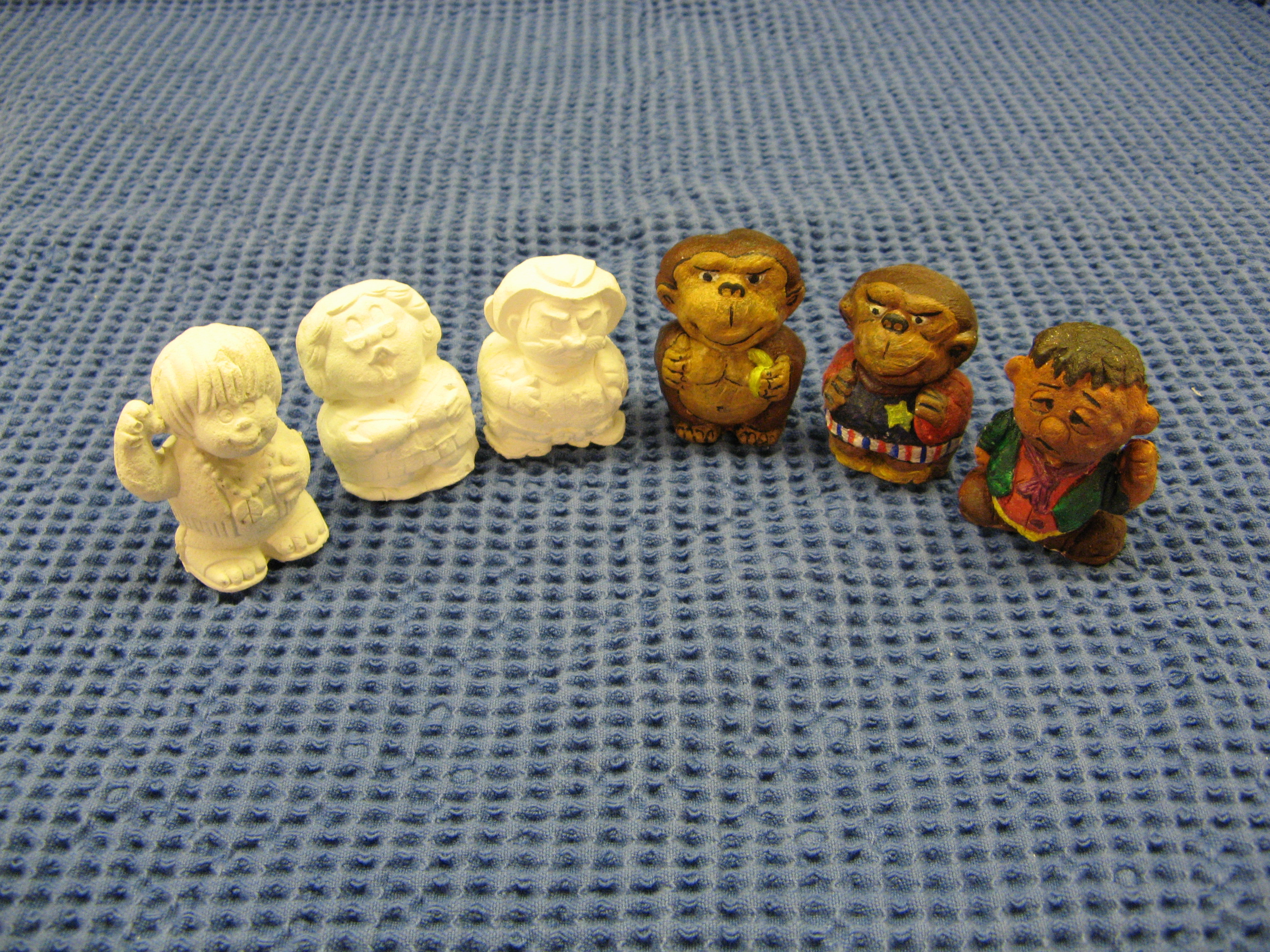
Painted and unpainted figures

Shaker Maker is a toy for making figures. Water and a powder must be mixed in a shaker and after turning the shaker the mixture flows into moulds inside the shaker. Because of fast polymerisation the consistency of the mixture becomes like pudding in seconds. After some days it hardens.

Shaker Maker was invented in the 1970s by the firm Ideal Toy Company. The toy was primarily sold in the US, Canada and some countries in Europe. In the 1990s and the 2000s there were two relaunches of Shaker Maker but these met with less success.

== Principle ==
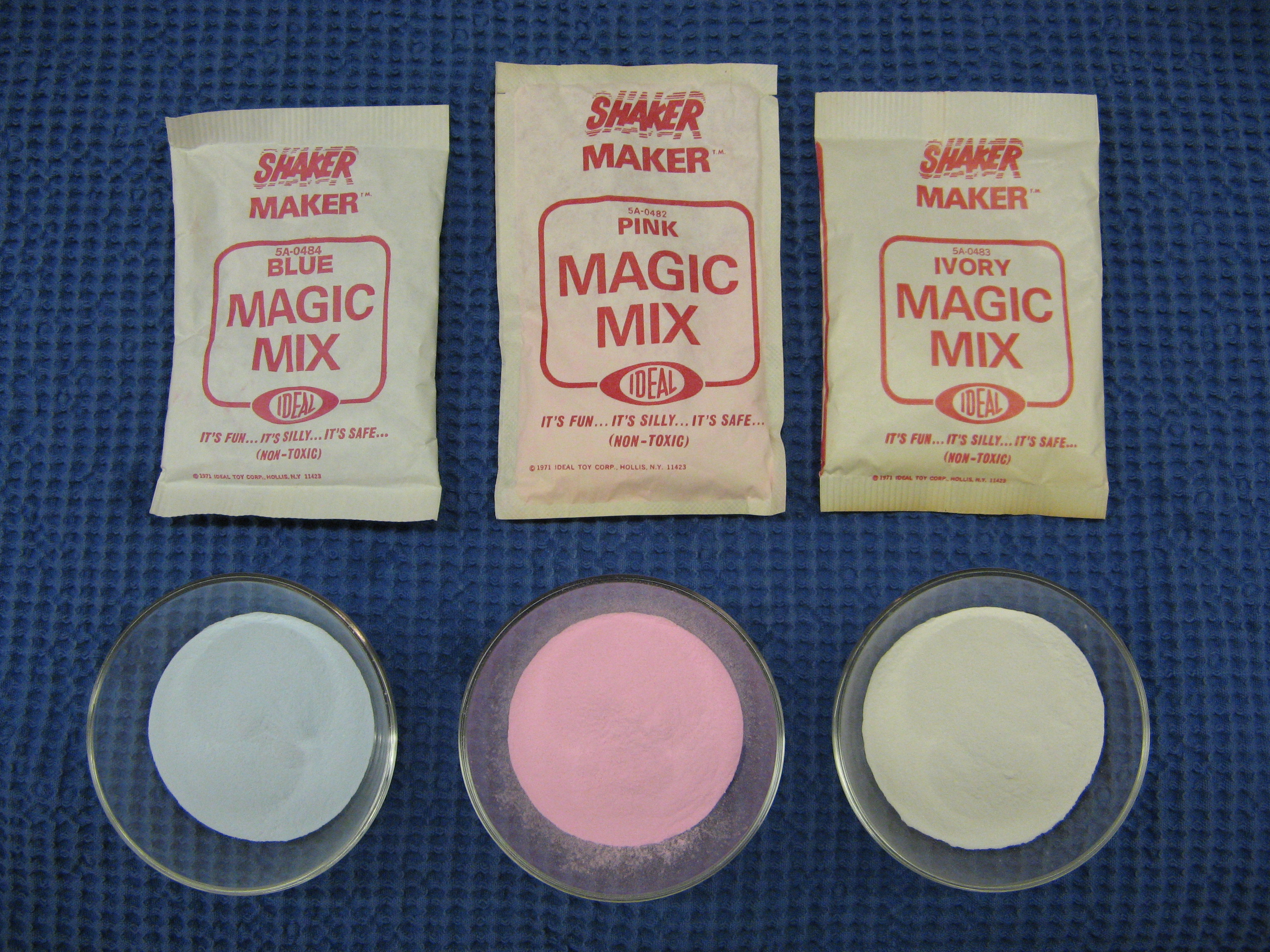
Magic Mix in blue, pink and ivory

Shaker Maker is a toy for children aged four years and older which makes it easy for them to make their own toy figures. The base element is a powder called "Magic Mix" which comes in a range of colours. After mixing with water it has to be shaken. After some seconds the shaker has to be turned so that the mixture can flow into a mould which is installed in the shaker. After five to ten minutes the mixture hardens, and the figures are ready to be taken out of their mould and placed on a drying stand. The figures shrink dramatically as they dry, and final drying can take another few days. When the figures are completely dry they can be painted and decorated.

== History ==
First created by Allen Greenberg and licensed to the Ideal Toy Company, the product appeared in stores in the early 1970s. In the early 1990s, Toymax, a New York-based company, licensed it from Greenberg and started producing it again. After that it was reissued by the Canadian firm Spin Master in 2003, and later by Flair.

== Sets ==
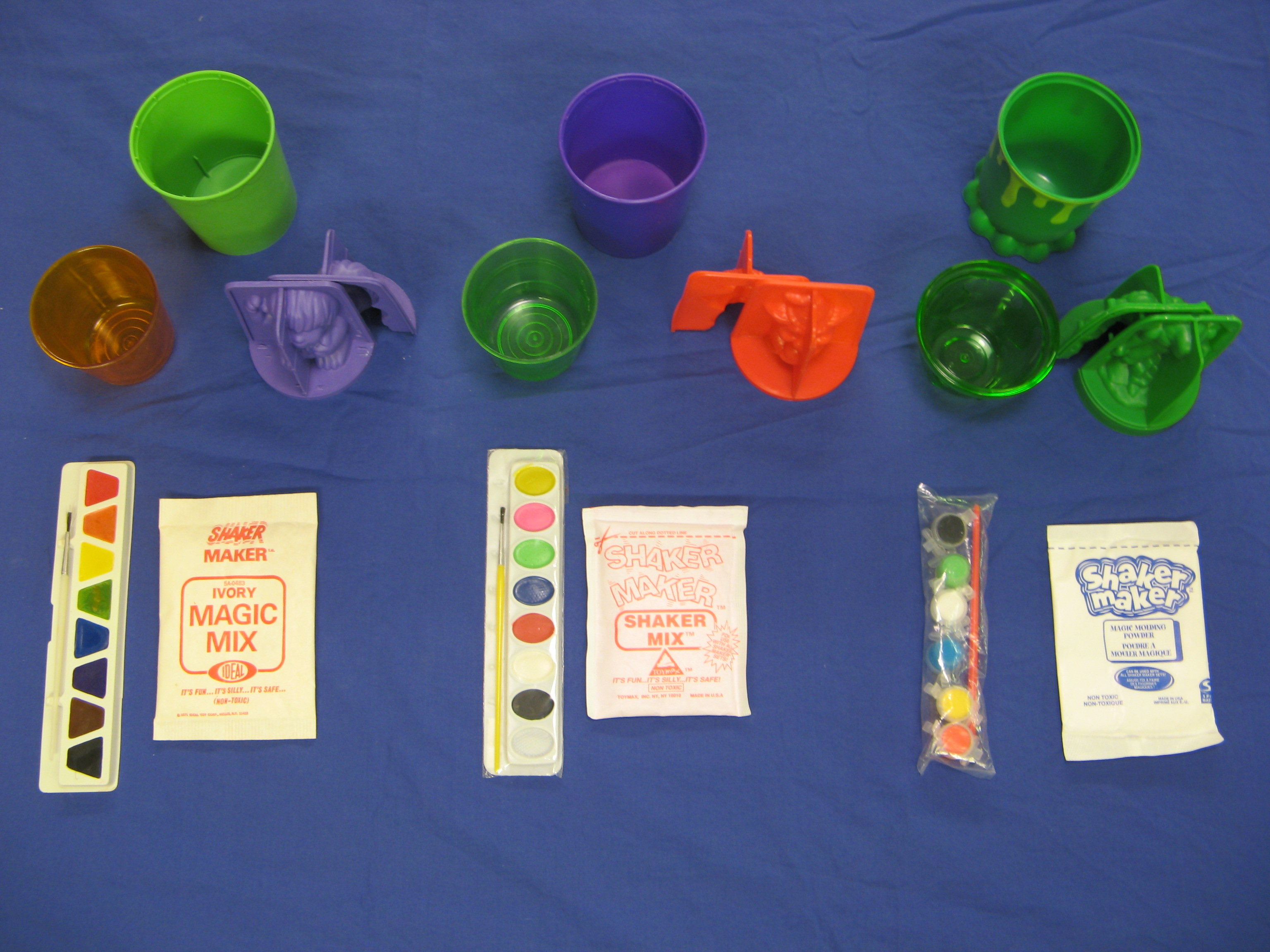
from left: Ideal, Toymax, Spin Master

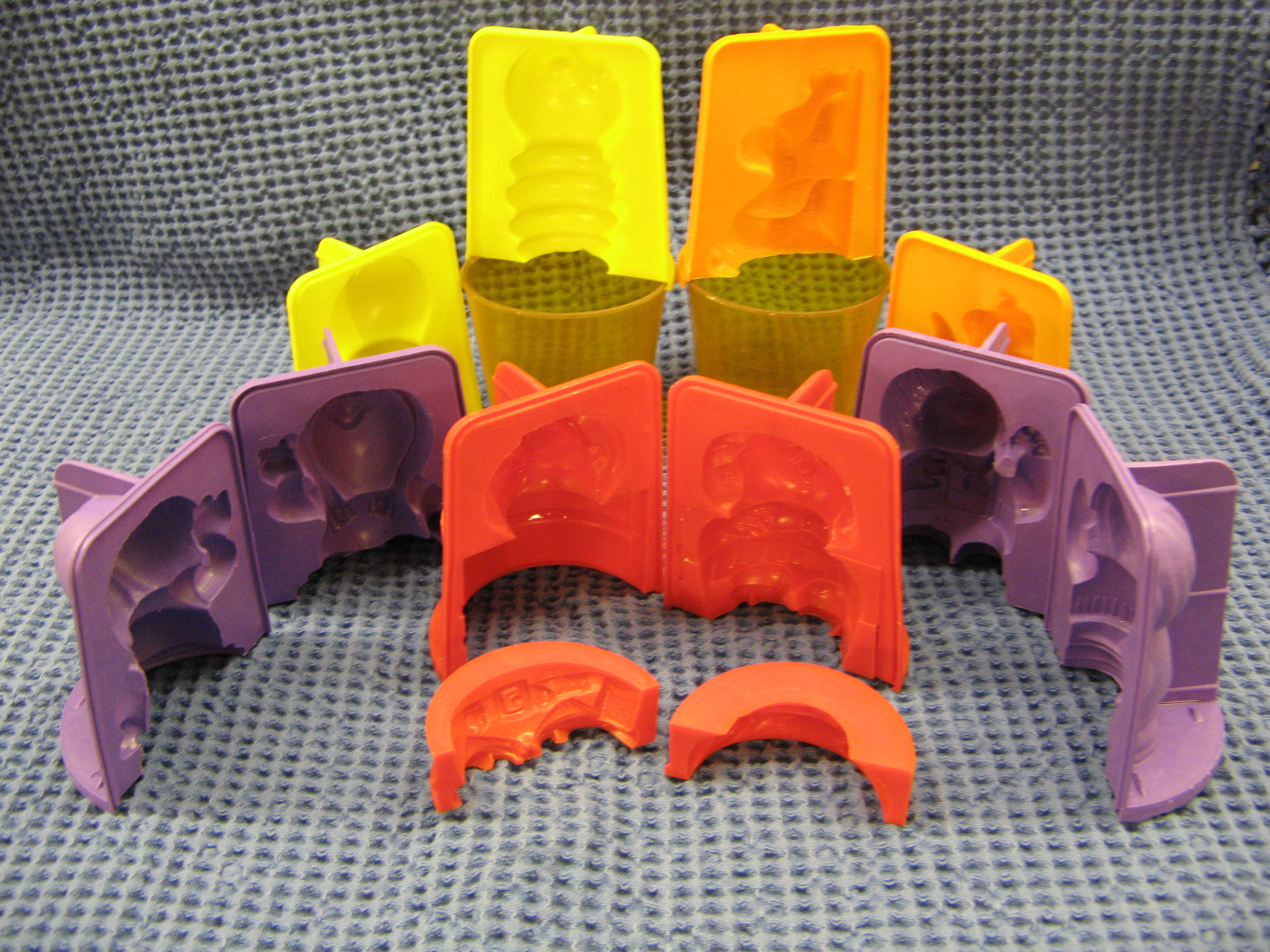
Molds of Ideal

The sets of Ideal and Toymax are compatible. A sample of sets:

=== Ideal ===
- People Series No. 1 (1971): Hippies.
- Disney characters (1972): Mickey Mouse, Donald Duck and Pluto
- The Flintstones characters (1973)
- Switchables (1973)
- Batman Playset
- The Magic Roundabout characters - Florence, Dougal and Zebedee (1974)
- The Wombles characters (1975)
- Hairy Bunch (Glow in the Dark)

=== Toymax ===
- Trolls
- Monsters
- Shrunken Headz

=== Spin Master and Flair Create ===
- Spider-Man
- Care Bears
- Hulk
- Disney Princess
- Dinosaurs
- Favourite Pets
- Scooby-Doo
- Batman
- Ben 10
- The Simpsons
- Dennis the Menace
- Disney Fairies
- Star Wars
- Toy Story
- Minnie Mouse
- Tatty Teddy
- Doctor Who
- Dora the Explorer
- Gormiti
- Tree Fu Tom
- Puppy In My Pocket
- Bakugan Battle Brawlers
- Superman
- Teenage Mutant Ninja Turtles

== Miscellaneous ==
English band Oasis has a song Shakermaker on their 1994 album Definitely Maybe. The song contains a number of references to British culture and children's toys of the 1970s, including Shaker Maker.
