= Motorific =

Toy car line

Motorific is the brand name of a line of battery-operated slot car toys and related accessories marketed by the Ideal Toy Company from 1964 to the early 1970s. It differed from traditional slot car sets in that the cars were powered independently by a pair of AA batteries, rather than by an electrical connection to the track.

The cars ran on slotted plastic track which was snapped together in various layouts, ranging from a simple oval to elaborate patterns, some featuring jumps and hazards ("Motorific Torture Track"). Switches were available; they were designed so that a regardless of the direction from which a vehicle entered the switch, it could exit through either of the other two tracks, and so that as the vehicle passed through the switch, it would reverse the position of the switch, so that if it entered again through the same branch, without the position being manually changed, it would take the opposite path.

After removing and inverting the detachable slot-car pin, the cars could also be run on the floor, with the front wheels steerable into one of three set positions (left, center, right), held by small detents on the reverse side of the pin.

Although some playsets were marketed to feature competitive play between two operators ("Racerific"), in truth there was little allowance for competition since there was no operator control over speed.

Motorific vehicles and accessories remain popular as collectibles, particularly with baby boomer toy aficionados.

== Marketing ==
Ideal introduced the Motorific line in 1964 as "The New Quick-Change Motor Toy", offering a variety of popular car body styles that were interchangeable with common snap-on chassis and electric motors. Each of the three elements were sold separately and as sets in various combinations, as well as being packaged with a variety of track layouts.

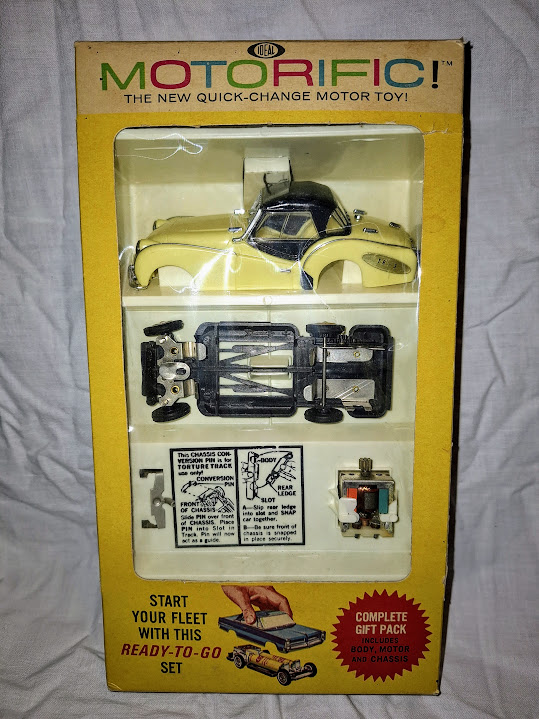
An Ideal Motorific Triumph TR-3 in its original package.

The interchangeable bodies rode on a plastic chassis, with a removable "CU-24" motor. It was powered by two AA batteries which mounted in the chassis. An "On-Off" switch was on the bottom of the chassis. A removable metal conversion pin would slide on the front part of the chassis, in order to make the car usable on a Motorific (or regular slot car) track.

Motorific tracks were produced in three different types: Torture Tracks, Action Highway Sets and Racerific Sets. The initial release in 1964 included Torture Tracks, the largest of which were the Giant Detroit and the GTO.

"Action Highway" track sections included an intersection with a traffic signal on one corner: it could be set to allow vehicles to take either straight path through the intersection (it did not permit turns), while physically blocking the slot for the other straight path; the signal was geared to rotate, presenting a green indication to the open path, and a red indication to the blocked one. Another section was a construction zone with an animated flagman (controlled by a concealed magnet on an arm under the track): when a vehicle entered the track section, a turntable built into the track would act as a treadmill, causing the flagman to move across the road before the vehicle was allowed to proceed. Yet another section was a trailer terminal, with various mechanical devices that would semiautomatically hitch or unhitch a semi-trailer, and reverse the direction of the tractor_unit. There was also a collapsing bridge section, complete with a detour.

The following Action Highway sets were sold by Ideal from smallest to largest: Action Highway 77; Action Highway Cross Country (Ideal Canada) and Action Highway Midnight Freight which both included a Construction Site; Action Highway 87 which included a Construction Site and a short bypass highway; Action Highway 88 which included an elevated road and a collapsing bridge; Action Highway 95 (Sears) and Action Highway 1 (Ideal Australia), which both included an elevated seven piece highway, an intersection and a two-way Service Station; Action Highway 97 which included a Construction Site, an elevated road, a short bypass highway and a Mystery Warehouse; Action Highway 98 which included a Construction Site, an intersection and a Truck Terminal; Action Highway Midnight Special which included a Construction Site, an elevated road, and a lighted Loading Crane Platform; Action Highway 99 which included an elevated seven piece highway, an intersection, a collapsing bridge and a Billboard Speed Trap with operating siren and 1963 Mercury Marauder State Police car; Action Highway 100 which included a Construction Site, an elevated road and a Truck Terminal; Action Highway Midnight Express which included an elevated seven piece highway, a Truck Terminal and a lighted Loading Crane Platform; Action Highway 101 which included a Construction Site, an intersection, an elevated seven piece highway, a Truck Terminal and a Mystery Warehouse. Each of the smaller Action Highway sets came with one truck. The larger sets came with a truck and a car. The sets with a Truck Terminal or lighted Loading Crane Platform (98, 100, 101 Midnight Special and Midnight Express), came with a Semi-Truck and trailer, (blue cab with yellow reefer for 98, 100 and 101 or green cab and orange stake bed for the Midnight series which also had "Real operating headlights"), instead of a truck. Midnight Express also included a yellow reefer with a black top as well as the orange stake bed trailer.

There were 10 different Motorific trucks for the Highway sets. An 11th twin truck (Refrigerator Van "Suburban") with working cargo doors was also produced. The following trucks either came with or were available for purchase for use with the Action Highway sets: Fire Patrol Pumper, Mighty Hauler Dump Truck, Mighty Mixer Cement Truck, Refrigerator Van "Suburban" with "Real operating headlights", Refrigerator Van "Suburban" working cargo doors, Refrigerator Van "Suburban", Tri-Cola Delivery Truck, Thruway Service Wrecker, Stake Truck, Highway Maintenance, and Troop Transport.

A special custom edition of the Motorific Torture Track was sold through Flying A (now Getty) gas stations in 1966, consisting of three individual sets with custom Flying A signs for the hazards.

In the first two years of distribution, there were 18 different Motorific car body styles offered for sale. Subsequently, a large number of styles became available in a "Motorific Custom Cars" line. The original models included the Thunderbird, Continental, Corvette, Rolls-Royce, Mercury, Ford Truck, Imperial, Cadillac, Ford Wagon, Grand Prix, Impala, and Jaguar XKE.

Later releases included the Aston Martin, Barracuda, Riviera, Camaro, Duesenberg Phantom, Dune Buggy, Ferrari Berlinetta, 1957 Chevrolet, Ford Hot Rod, Mustang, Karmann Ghia, Mercedes Benz, Cougar, Woody Wagon, and Triumph TR-3.

The "Racing Car" series included the Chaparral, Ferrari 250, Ford J, Ford Mark I, Mako Shark, and Porsche GT. This series featured a beefier chassis than the original cars, with larger wheels and tires.

Ideal later introduced a smaller-scale car line more suited to racing ("Mini-Motorific"), as well as sets featuring Motorific trucks ("Action Highway") which ran on wider-sized track, and a line of motorized boats ("Boaterific").

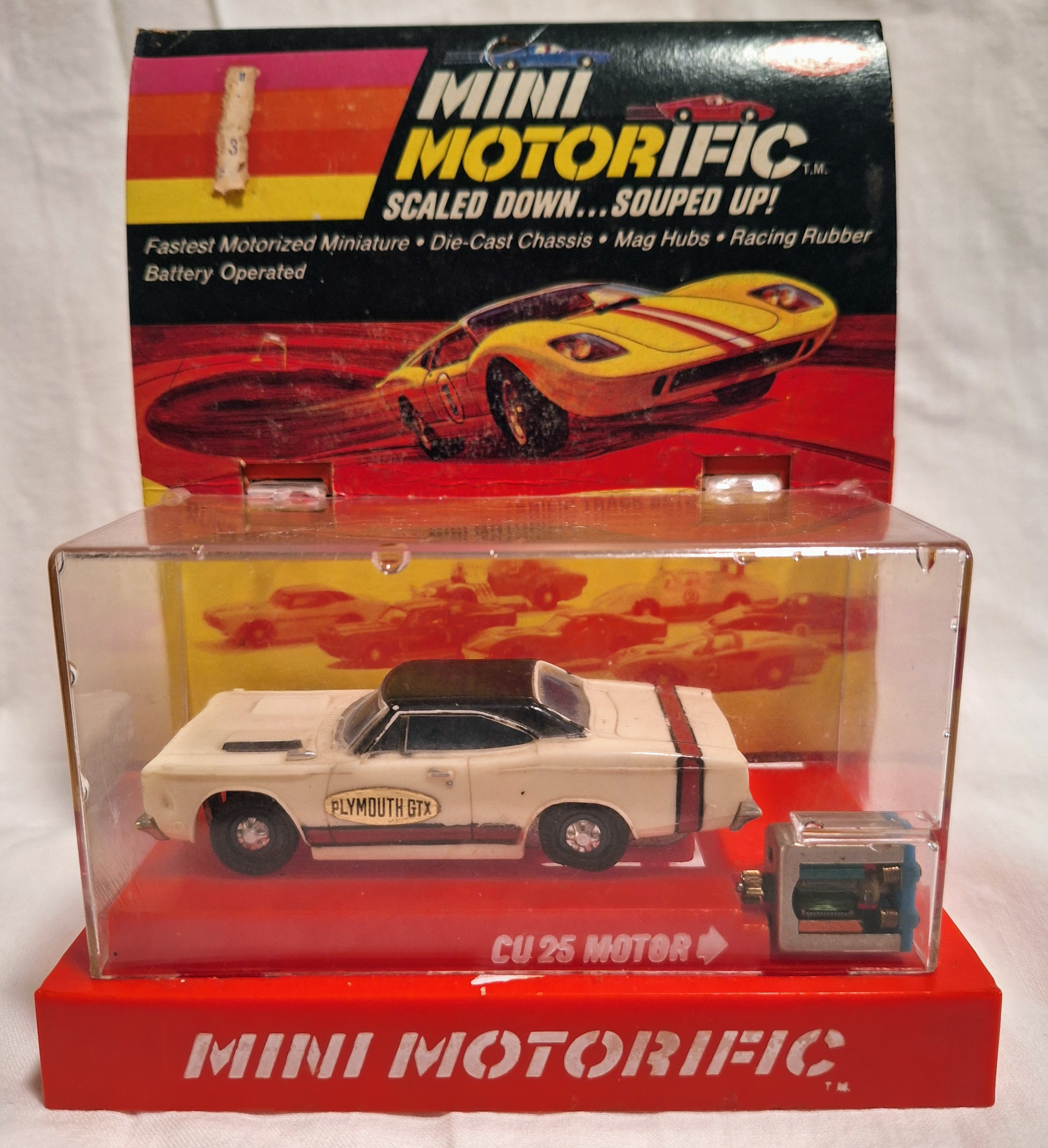
An Ideal Mini Motorific Plymouth GTX in its original package.

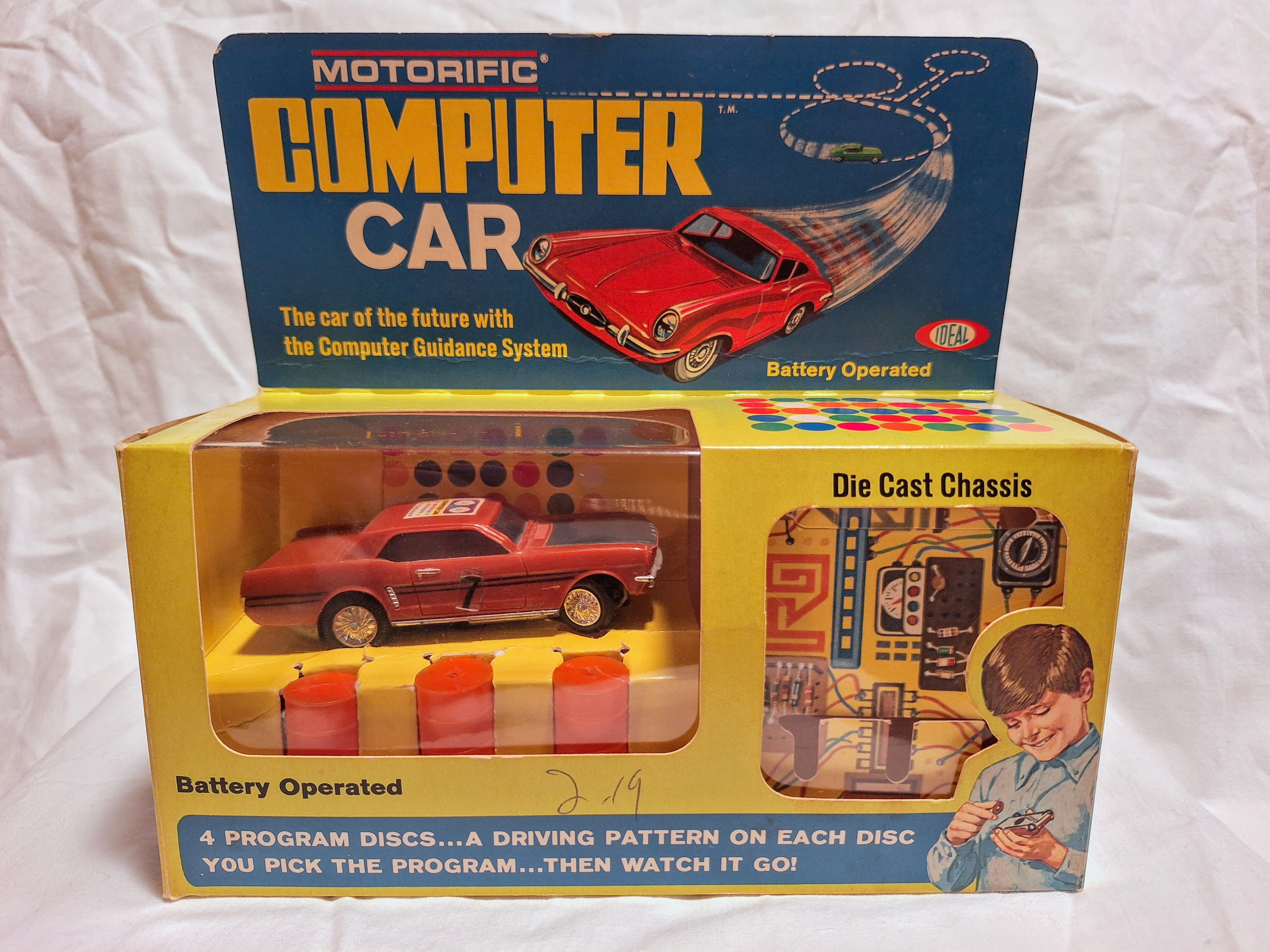
An Ideal Motorific Ford Mustang Computer Car

The "Mini-Motorific" line included the Bonneville Racer, Chaparral D2, Charger, Custom Rod, Delta Duo, Ferrari Special, Firebird, Ford Allegro, Ford GT Mark IV, Mangusta, Plymouth GTX, Police Car, Porsche 907, Shelby Mustang, Stingray, and Wrecker. The chassis on the Minis were diecast, and used a smaller version of the motor, now referred to as "CU-25". The conversion pin was now built into the chassis, and folded up when not in use. The "Motorific Truck" series included the Fire Patrol Pumper, Mighty Hauler Dump Truck, Mighty Mixer Cement Truck, Refrigerator Van, Tri-Cola Delivery, Thruway Service Wrecker, Stake Truck, Highway Maintenance, Troop Transport, and Tractor Trailer.

A line of "Computer Cars" were also introduced late in the production run. Unlike the other cars, they did not run on a track. They were designed to run only on the floor. An interchangeable plastic cam in the bottom of the model car would change the direction the car traveled. The cams were for Figure 8, Slalom, Square, and Dog Bone. Three orange barrels were included with the cars to navigate around. The chassis was a combination of the past designs. It was a full size motorific body with a diecast chassis, but used the smaller "CU-25" motor from the Mini line. The bodies used were re-issues of older motorific styles, but had new color schemes and a "Computer Car" decal on the roof top of each car. The "Computer Car" series included the Camaro, Mustang, Ferrari, Triumph TR-3, Jaguar XKE, and the Barracuda.

== U.S. Customs appeal ==
In 1970, the United States Court of Customs and Patent Appeals denied Ideal's request to have Motorific plastic car bodies and chassis reclassified as "parts" rather than toys. Such a reclassification would have significantly reduced the importation tariff charged to Ideal (10%-17%, versus 35%). The appeal document revealed the company's two-year sales unit figures for Motorific: in 1964, Ideal sold 935,928 chassis; 1,761,186 car bodies; and 695,805 electric motors. In 1965, they sold 3,749,561 chassis; 4,260,793 bodies; and 3,937,201 motors.

== Revival ==
In 2003, Big Time Toys of Nashville, Tennessee resurrected the Motorifc name for a series of cars and tracks. The scale of the cars was slightly bigger than the original Ideal Motorifc 1:43 scale. The design of the interchangeable bodies was retained. The new cars came with a set of two motors, one for regular speed and one for faster speeds. In addition, the cars came with a series of parts to customize the vehicles, much like the last generation of Topper Johnny Lightning called "CUSTOMS" that came with an assortment of accessories that you could add to your car to "Customize it". The track pieces that Big Time Toys issued for the new Motorific were designed very similar to the original Ideal track but were a slightly bigger scale. Because of this, they could not be used along with the original Ideal designed track. Due to their limited release when new, the Big Time Toys released Motorifics have become much rarer than the mass produced Ideal cars and tracks.

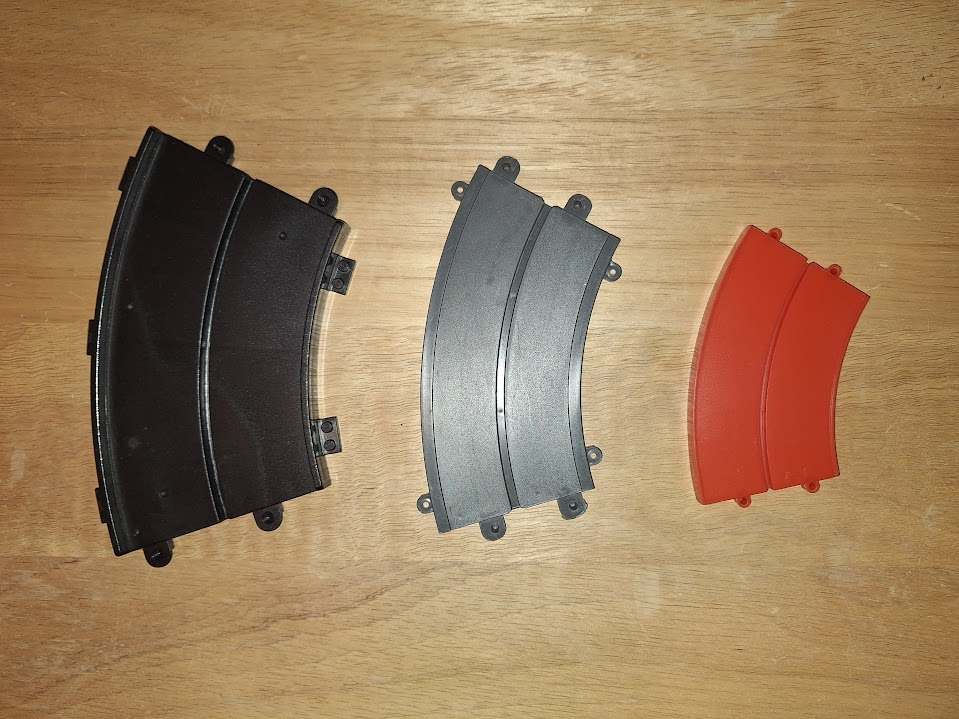
L-R comparison: Big Time Toys track, Ideal Full-Size Motorific track, Ideal Mini-Motorific track.
