= Jimmy Keddie =

James "Jimmy" Keddie DFM
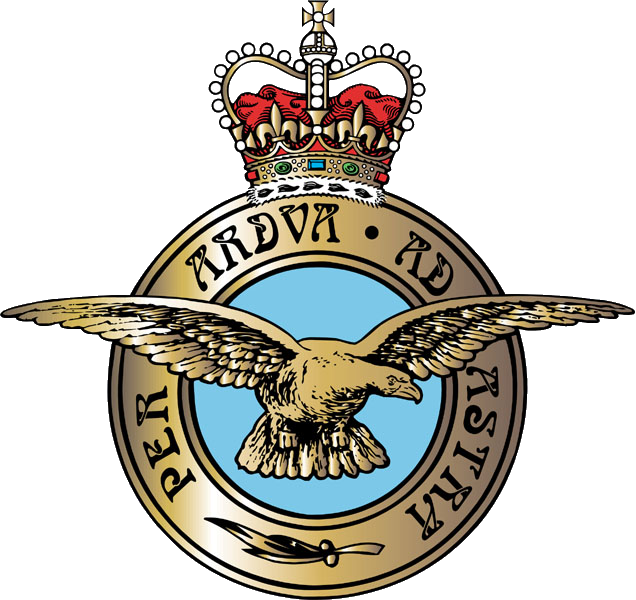
- Born: James Keddie; 16 October 1918; Milnathort, Scotland
- Died: 20 November 2000 (aged 82); Withington Hospital, Manchester
- Military career
- Allegiance: UK
- Branch: Royal Air Force
- Service years: 1939–1946
- Rank: Flight lieutenant
- Nickname: "Jimmy" or "Pongo" (Note: "Pongo" is a traditional affectionate Royal Navy and Royal Air Force nickname for a soldier, no doubt acquired because of Keddie's service in the Territorial Army. "Where the army goes, the pong goes", is the alleged source of the sobriquet.)
- Service number: 659018 and 147703
- Units: No. 61 Squadron RAF; No. 97 Squadron RAF
- Conflicts: World War II: Channel Front (POW)
- Awards: Distinguished Flying Medal

James Keddie DFM (16 October 1918 – 20 November 2000) was a British Lancaster bomb aimer who was taken prisoner during the Second World War. He took part in the 'Great Escape' from Stalag Luft III in March 1944 and was one of the men captured inside the tunnel after the escape was discovered.

== War service ==
Jimmy Keddie was born in Milnathort, Scotland; he was a tyre builder when he enlisted in the Territorial Army at the outbreak of war in 1939. He served in France and at Dunkirk and after returning to England transferred to the Royal Air Force as an aircrew candidate with the service number 659018. Completing training as a bomb aimer he flew night bombing operations with No. 61 Squadron RAF in the crew of Squadron Leader Kenneth Burns DSO DFC*. He transferred to the Pathfinder Force along with his pilot joining No. 97 Squadron RAF. With a strong recommendation dated 29 May 1943 he was awarded a Distinguished Flying Medal for his bravery as a bomb aimer during bombing missions commencing January 1943 against targets such as Düsseldorf, Hamburg, Duisburg, Berlin, Essen, La Spezia, Pilson and Dortmund. His Avro Lancaster was damaged by anti-aircraft fire over Pilsen in May 1943 and over Turin in July 1943. The DFM was announced in the London Gazette of 13 July 1943. Meanwhile, Keddie was commissioned as pilot officer on 3 June 1943. before quickly being promoted flying officer on 2 December 1943. He was promoted flight lieutenant on 26 May 1945 after returning from captivity.

== Prisoner of war ==
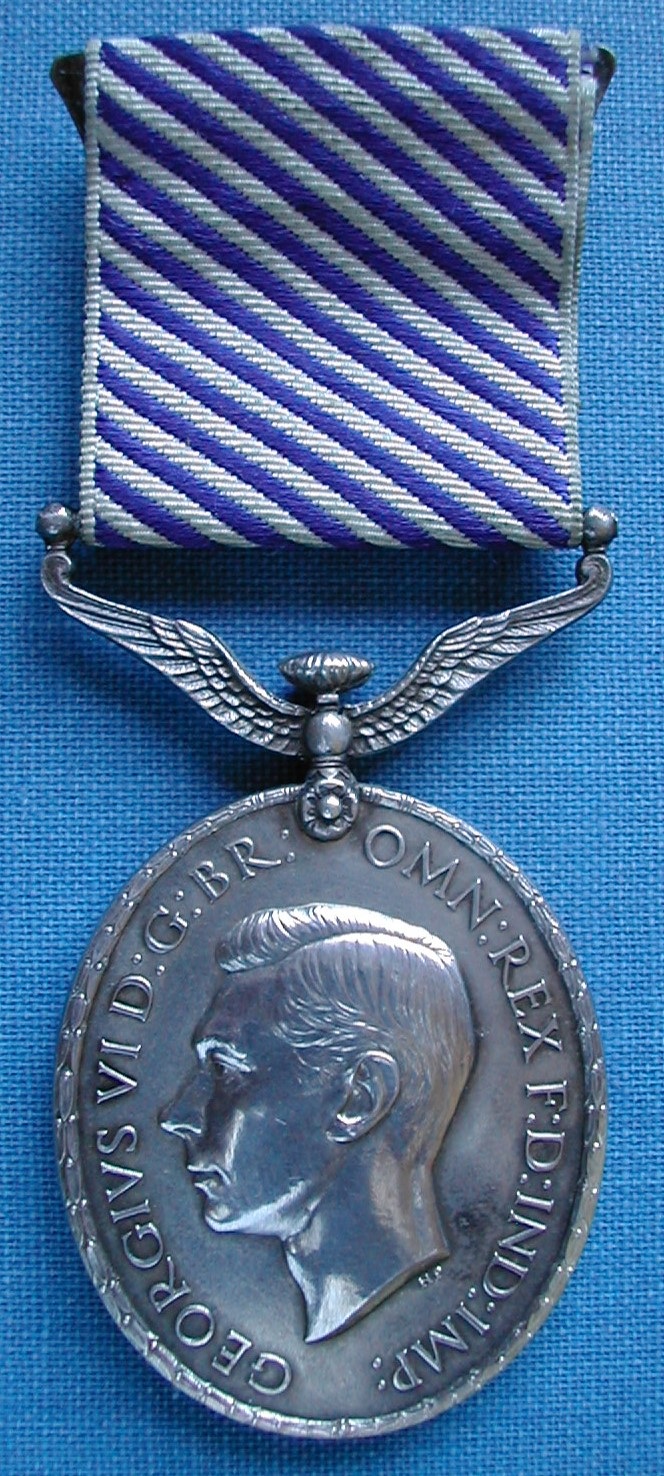
Distinguished Flying Medal.

As bomb aimer aboard Pathfinder Lancaster Mark III serial JA916 flown by Wing Commander Ken Burns DSO DFC*, Keddie took off from RAF Bourn at 2037 hours on 30 August 1943. to bomb Berlin Early in the morning of 31 August the bomber was hit by a German nightfighter over Berlin, its petrol tanks caught fire and its rear gunner was killed. The pilot ordered the crew to bale out. Burns landed by parachute badly wounded. On landing Keddie was badly beaten by a mob of German civilians and policemen and one of the crew was killed by the mob. After 42 missions Keddie was captured becoming a prisoner of war (PoW number 2475) and was sent to Stalag Luft III in Germany in the province of Lower Silesia near the town of Sagan (now Żagań in Poland).

== 'Great Escape' ==
Keddie was a well known character in Stalag Luft III for his ability to distract the guards as other prisoners distributed earth dug from the tunnels into the camp garden areas. For the Great Escape operation he frequently took part in the tunnelling with Henry Birkland.

When the alarm was sounded and shots fired as the 77th escaper was sighted running from the tunnel mouth to the woods Keddie was preparing to enter the main tunnel. His prisoner of war debriefing document completed in England on 3 May 1945 confirms his participation in the "mass break at Saga on 24 March 1944". He spent the remainder of the war in prison camps or marching away from the advancing Russian Red Army.

== Post-war career ==
Keddie left the RAF after war service and settled at Hawick to work on the construction of waterworks in Galashiels. When the movie The Great Escape was released he and another Hawick resident, Norman Martin (also a former prisoner at Stalag Luft III), were invited to the Hawick Odeon cinema as guests of honour making front page of the Hawick Express. In 1968 he moved to Manchester as a car salesman and died in 2000 in Manchester.

Keddie is seen for a brief moment smoking a pipe behind Liam Gallagher, in the Oasis video for Shakermaker, at the 3:17 mark.
