= Crossfire (board game) =

1971 board game

- Other names: Kreuzfeuer (German)
- Publishers: Ideal Toy Company (1971-1977); Milton Bradley (1987-1994); Hasbro (2016-present)
- Publication: 1971; 55 years ago
- Genres: Board game
- Languages: English
- Players: 2
- Playing time: 10'
- Age range: 7+

Crossfire is a board game created by the Ideal Toy Company in 1971. The object of the game is to score goals by pushing one of the two pucks into the opposing player's goal. This task is accomplished by shooting small metal ball bearings at the pucks using the attached guns. The earliest version of the game featured a flat board, whereas the 1990s release featured a dome-shaped board. This allows the ball bearings to roll into the players' bins more easily but can cause the pucks to indefinitely rest at the edges of the board. In the 2010s rerelease, the board was sloped with a shallow grade, preventing the pucks from sliding on their own as much and making it easier to get them away from the borders.

== Gameplay ==
The two pucks are made of plastic and rest on a central metal ball bearing. The bearing can spin and roll within the plastic mold allowing greater puck movement and responsiveness to hits. One of the pucks is shaped like a triangle, the other a star. The object of the game is to get either piece into your opponent's goal. The first to three goals wins.

== Marketing ==
The early 1990s American commercial campaign for this product may be arguably its better-known aspect, portraying the game featured in a supposed near post-apocalyptic future, with the game used for a battle between two young men as "the ultimate challenge". The hero in the exchange was portrayed by a young Tim Maynard, a Shakespearean actor who transitioned into daytime soap opera acting. The music jingle was written and produced by Clay Mills and Richard Berg.

== Video game ==
An arcade video game version of Crossfire was planned for release by Atari in 1975. However, the game was not released, and only a small number of prototypes were produced.

== Reviews ==
- Games #93
