= Astro Base =

Toy

Johnny Astro Base was a toy made by the Ideal company in the early 1960s. The toy ran on four D cell batteries. Besides a power switch, it had several features that includes the following modes of operation:

== Modes of operation ==
- Astro Scope: Switch to Astro Scope and a scene of spaceships, rockets, and jets rotates through a viewfinder just below a radar dome on the top of the toy. A button on the console let the user "fire" at objects seen on the screen, which would pause the rotating images and emit a machine-gun style sound.
- Space Lock: A crane emerges from the hatch on one side of the toy. This crane has a hoist operation that can be used to raise or lower a plastic astronaut figure, or other objects that the user may have that can be connected to the hook at the end of a chain. The main purpose of this crane is to insert or remove the astronaut from a scout car.
- Scout Car: The scout car can be plugged into a port on the console and controlled by a two position switch marked "turn" and "drive" that can actually be used to steer the vehicle with a bit of practice. The scout car also has missiles that can be launched.

Ideal made two variations of the Astro Base. The original "all red" version featured a lighted Astro Scope that illuminated the pictures spinning around the Astro Scope. Ideal Toys discontinued this version and offered the common "red and white" version.
