= Buckaroo! =

Tabletop game

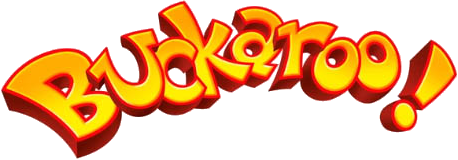

- Cover of Buck-a-roo by Ideal Toys, 1970
- Designers: Julius Cooper
- Publishers: Ideal Toy; Milton Bradley; Hasbro
- Publication: 1970; 56 years ago
- Years active: 1970–present
- Genres: Board game
- Languages: English
- Players: 2–4
- Playing time: 10'
- Age range: 4+

Buckaroo! is a game of physical skill, intended for players aged four and above. Buckaroo! has been published by several game companies such as Ideal Toy, Milton Bradley, and Hasbro.

== Description ==
The game centers on an articulated plastic model of a mule named "Roo" (or "Buckaroo"). The mule begins the game standing on all four feet, with a blanket on its back. Players take turns placing various items onto the mule's back without causing the mule to buck up on its front legs, throwing off all the accumulated items (the toy has a spring mechanism that is triggered by significant vibration). There are 12 different items players can stack onto the Mule. The player who triggered this buck is knocked out of the game, and play resumes. The winner is the last player remaining in the game. In the (unlikely) event that a player manages to place the last item onto the mule's back without it bucking, that player is the winner.

The toy has three sensitivity levels that are adjustable via a switch located on the side of the mule's body, under the blanket. The switch adjusts the location of the lever to which the blanket is attached in relation to the trigger mechanism attached to the spring.

=== Items ===
The items that players must place on the mule's back are (variations in names from the 2007 UK version in parentheses):

- a bedroll
- a canteen (water bottle)
- a cowboy hat
- a crate (rifle box)
- a frying pan
- a guitar
- a holster (holster with gun)
- a lantern (lamp)
- a rope
- a saddle
- a shovel
- a stick of dynamite

Of these, the saddle must be placed first. It has a number of articulation points on which the subsequent items are hung. These other items may be placed in any order.

== History ==
The original version was released in 1970 by Ideal Toy Company and contained a white mule, while later editions contain a brown one.

=== Criticism ===
In 2006, Buckaroo! was recalled, due to the objects getting flung off the mule when the spring is triggered. On Good Morning America and CTV News, it was mentioned that an object had hit a child in the eye, in North Carolina, causing the 8-year-old boy to have surgery. The game was discontinued until 2008 when the instructions were adjusted.

== In popular culture ==
- Buckaroo! is a favorite game of Father Dougal McGuire in Irish sitcom Father Ted. He regularly plays the game with Ted, despite the fact that Ted hates it and would rather play chess.
- Buckaroo! is recreated by the team of Ed Gamble, Katy Wix, and Rose Matafeo on the fourth episode of the 9th series of Taskmaster
