= Shakermaker =

1994 single by Oasis

Single by Oasis

from the album Definitely Maybe
- B-side: "D'Yer Wanna Be a Spaceman?"; "Alive" (8-track demo); "Bring It On Down" (live)
- Released: 20 June 1994
- Recorded: October 1993; 14 April 1994
- Studio: Out of the Blue (Manchester, England)
- Genre: Britpop; neo-psychedelia
- Length: 5:08
- Label: Creation
- Songwriter: Noel Gallagher
- Producers: Oasis; Mark Coyle; Owen Morris

Oasis singles chronology
"Supersonic" (1994)	"Shakermaker" (1994)	"Live Forever" (1994)

Definitely Maybe track listing
- 11 tracks: 1. "Rock 'n' Roll Star"; 2. "Shakermaker"; 3. "Live Forever"; 4. "Up in the Sky"; 5. "Columbia"; 6. "Supersonic"; 7. "Bring It on Down"; 8. "Cigarettes & Alcohol"; 9. "Digsy's Dinner"; 10. "Slide Away"; 11. "Married with Children"

Music video
- "Shakermaker" on YouTube

"Shakermaker" is a song by the English rock band Oasis. Written by lead guitarist Noel Gallagher, the song was first released on 20 June 1994, by Creation Records, as the second single from their debut studio album Definitely Maybe (1994). The single peaked at number eleven in the UK. It was certified silver by the British Phonographic Industry in 2013, having previously been their only single of the 1990s not to be certified in the UK. As of 2021, it remains the only single from the band's first two albums not to reach at least platinum status in the UK.

== Background ==
Noel Gallagher states that the lyrics are taken from the world around him. For example, a Shaker Maker was a popular toy in the 1970s; the character of "Mr Soft" was taken from a Trebor Soft Mints commercial, which featured Cockney Rebel's song "Mr. Soft"; "Mr. Clean" is a song by the Jam, one of Gallagher's favourite bands; Mr Benn is a British children's cartoon; and the entire last verse – "Mr Sifter sold me songs / When I was just 16 / Now he stops at traffic lights / But only when they're green" – was written in a taxi on the way to the recording studio to record the song. Apparently, Liam Gallagher was pestering Noel to finish the song just as the taxi stopped at the traffic lights outside "Sifters" (a record shop on Fog Lane, Didsbury, Manchester), named after people 'sifting' through records and run by Peter Howard since 1977. Noel, who used to frequent the store to buy old records before Oasis started releasing albums, penned the lyric and it became part of the song.

"Shakermaker" illustrates Noel's habit of borrowing from the past: the chords are a simple twelve-bar blues progression (albeit with the V (F♯) raised to a flat-VII (A)). The melody for the verse was originally taken from "I'd Like to Teach the World to Sing (In Perfect Harmony)" by Roger Cook, Roger Greenaway, Bill Backer and Billy Davis. An Oasis tribute band called No Way Sis released a cover version of "I'd Like to Teach the World to Sing" in the style of "Shakermaker", emphasising the similarity between the two songs. This cover reached No. 27 on the UK singles chart in December 1996. Oasis were sued over this similarity and were forced to change their composition.

== B-sides ==
The song was released with three B-sides: "D'Yer Wanna Be a Spaceman?" (first appearing on the Live Recordings demo tape), sung by Noel Gallagher, which is instrumentally similar to "Married with Children" from Definitely Maybe and features nostalgic lyrics and two-part backing vocals by Liam; "Alive", a rough demo of an early rocker, and a live version of "Bring It on Down".

== Music video ==
The music video was primarily filmed in Didsbury, South Manchester. The majority of the video focuses on the band in a ginnel situated behind the then-address of Bonehead on Stratford Road, West Didsbury - the same house wherein the Definitely Maybe album artwork was photographed.

The video also features the band playing football on one of the nearby fields, some have speculated that this is Fog Lane Park, where others have stated it may be Millgate Fields, just off of Ford Lane. There is however no reliable source for either case.

Liam and Noel are both shown entering Sifter's Records on Fog Lane, Burnage. The album Liam shows to the camera is Paul McCartney and Wings's album Red Rose Speedway. The music video garnered 5 million views on YouTube.

Jimmy Keddie is seen for a brief moment smoking a pipe behind Liam Gallagher, at the 3:17 mark.

== Live performances ==
The song has been performed at two of Oasis’ appearances at the Glastonbury Festival, one in 1994 and the second in 1995, at which Robbie Williams met briefly on stage with Liam Gallagher during the guitar solo.

== Personnel ==
Oasis

- Liam Gallagher – vocals, tambourine
- Noel Gallagher – lead guitar, backing vocals
- Paul Arthurs – rhythm guitar
- Paul McGuigan – bass
- Tony McCarroll – drums

Additional personnel

- Mark Coyle – production, engineering
- Oasis – production
- Owen Morris – additional production, mixing
- Barry Grint – mastering at Abbey Road Studios, London
- Anjali Dutt – engineering
- Dave Scott – engineering, mixing
- Roy Spong – engineering

== Track listings ==
- CD CRESCD 182
1. "Shakermaker" – 5:08
2. "D'Yer Wanna Be a Spaceman?" – 2:41
3. "Alive" (8-track demo) – 3:56
4. "Bring It on Down" (live) – 4:17
- 7" CRE 182
1. "Shakermaker" – 5:08
2. "D'Yer Wanna Be a Spaceman?" – 2:41
- 12" CRE 182T
1. "Shakermaker" – 5:08
2. "D'Yer Wanna Be a Spaceman?" – 2:41
3. "Alive" (8-track demo) – 3:56
- Cassette CRECS 182
1. "Shakermaker" – 5:08
2. "D'Yer Wanna Be a Spaceman?" – 2:41
- CD maxi-single HES 661377 2
1. "Shakermaker" – 5:11
2. "D'Yer Wanna Be a Spaceman?" – 2:41
3. "Alive" (8 Track Demo) – 3:57
4. "Bring It On Down" (Live) – 4:18
5. "I Will Believe" (Live) – 3:48
6. "Cloudburst" – 5:19

== Charts ==
=== Weekly charts ===
Chart (1994)	Peak position
Europe (Eurochart Hot 100)	45
Israel (IBA)	38
Scottish Singles Sales (Official Charts)	6
UK Singles (Official Charts)	11
UK Airplay (Music Week)	37

=== Year-end charts ===
Chart (1994)	Position
UK Singles (OCC)	192

== Certifications ==
Region	Certification	Certified units/sales
United Kingdom (BPI)	Gold	400,000^{‡}
^{‡} Sales+streaming figures based on certification alone.
