= Up Against Time =

Up Against Time (or later as Up! Against Time) is a children's game (aged 7 and above) first marketed by the Ideal Toy Company in 1977.

The game features an upright plastic board through which a steel ball moves down to a ramp at the bottom. Below the ramp players attempt to build a tower of interlocking plastic 'barrels'. Each barrel has different protruding shapes on top and different indented shapes on the bottom (slots, circles and triangles). Each player attempts to build the stack of barrels as high as they can (using with just one hand) after the steel ball is released. When they have either completed a full tower of 12 barrels or as many as possible they can drop a gate to stop the steel ball collapsing their tower. Play consists of three rounds and the total number of barrels is totalled up for a winner.
