= Ideal Toy Company =

American toy company

- Formerly: Ideal Novelty and Toy Company (1903–38); Ideal Toy Company (1938–84); View-Master Ideal (1984–97)
- Type: Private (1908–82); Subsidiary (1982–97)
- Industry: Entertainment
- Founded: 1908
- Founders: Morris Michtom; Rose Michtom
- Defunct: 1997; 29 years ago
- Fate: Merged with Mattel in 1997, becoming a brand
- Headquarters: Hollis, Queens (1908–82); New Jersey (1982–97), US
- Key people: Abraham Katz, Lionel A. Weintraub, Joseph C. Winkler
- Products: Dolls; Toys; Board games; Magic cubes
- Brands: Captain Action; Teddy Bear; Smokey Bear; Tressy
- Parent: CBS Toys (1982–84); Viewmaster International (1984–89); Tyco (1989–97)

Ideal Toy Company was an American toy company founded by Morris Michtom and his wife, Rose. During the post–World War II baby boom era, Ideal became the largest doll-making company in the United States. Their most popular dolls included Betsy Wetsy, Toni, Saucy Walker, Shirley Temple, Miss Revlon, Patti Playpal, Tammy, Thumbelina, Tiny Thumbelina, and Crissy. The company is also known for selling the Rubik's Cube.

== History ==
=== 1903–1939 ===
Original Ideal logo, 1938

Morris and Rose Michtom founded the Ideal Novelty and Toy Company, in Brooklyn, New York, when they invented the Teddy bear in 1903. Rose had made the original "Teddy's Bear" for their children. Morris and Rose sent a bear to President "Teddy" Roosevelt, and asked permission to use his name for the bear. Roosevelt "adopted" the bear and had it present in his campaign and on display at White House functions. After Morris Michtom's death in 1938, the company changed its name to the Ideal Toy Company, and Michtom's nephew Abraham Katz became chief executive.

Ideal began making dolls in 1907 to complement its line of teddy bears. Their first doll was “Yellow Kid,” from Richard Felton Outcault's comic strip of the same name. After that, Ideal began making a line of baby and character dolls such as Naughty Marietta (from the Victor Herbert operetta), and Admiral Dot. Ideal advertised their dolls as "unbreakable," since they were made of composition, a material made of sawdust and glue, rather than ceramics. Ideal produced over 200 variations of dolls throughout the composition era.

In 1914, Ideal had a boy doll launched named the Uneeda Kid, after a biscuit company. It was patented on December 8, 1914. The 15-inch boy doll wore a blue and white bloomer suit and held a box of Uneeda Biscuits under his arm.

One of Ideal's most lasting products was Betsy Wetsy, introduced in 1934 and in production for more than 50 years. The doll was named after the daughter of Abraham Katz, the head of the company. Ideal, via the Betsy Wetsy doll, was also one of the first doll manufacturers to produce an African American version of a popular doll. In 2003, the Toy Industry Association named Betsy Wetsy to its Century of Toys List, a compilation commemorating the 100 most memorable and most creative toys of the 20th century. Debuting in 1934, the Shirley Temple doll was Ideal's best-selling doll. The company followed this with licensed Disney dolls and a Judy Garland doll.

=== 1940–1969 ===
During World War II, the company's value rose from $2 million to $11 million. The company began selling dolls under license in Canada, Australia, the United Kingdom, and Brazil in the post–World War II baby boom era.

Two cosmetics-based doll series were launched after World War II: Toni was introduced at the end of the 1940s, and the Miss Revlon series followed in the 1950s. Doll designer, Judith Albert, worked for Ideal Toy Company from 1960 to 1982.

Key Ideal employees during the 1950s, '60s, and '70s were Lionel A. Weintraub and Joseph C. Winkler. Weintraub, the son-in-law of Abraham Katz, joined the company in 1941 and rose to become president, chairman of the board, and chief executive officer. Winkler joined Ideal in 1956, rising to vice president by 1971. Master sculptor, Vincent J. DeFilippo spent 27 years creating dolls for Ideal. Some of the company's most popular dolls during this period were Tammy (1962–1966), Flatsy dolls (1969–1973), Crissy (1969–1974), and Tressy (1970–1972).

Ideal had a hobby division in the 1950s, then shifted from that to games in 1962.

In 1951, Ideal partnered with its competitors the American Character Doll Company and the Alexander Doll Company to establish the United States-Israeli Toy and Plastic Corporation. The company was created to produce material for toys in Israel; the U.S. Ideal CEO, Abraham Katz, was named president of the new company.

In 1953, Ideal won the licensing rights to produce the U.S. Forest Service's Smokey Bear. They kept their licensing until 1968 when the U.S. Forest Service switched to Knickerbocker.

In 1966, Ideal released toy puppets of Muppet characters, including Kermit the Frog and Rowlf the Dog.

In 1968, Ideal joined the New York Stock Exchange.

In 1968, the American Character Doll Company filed for bankruptcy, and Ideal acquired the defunct company's dyes, patents, and trademarks, as well as specific products like the "Tressy" Gro-Hair doll.

=== 1970–1999 ===
By the early 1970s, 30% of the company's sales were games such as Mouse Trap and Hands Down.

Popular Ideal toys in the 1970s included a full line of Evel Knievel toys, Snoopy toys, and the Tuesday Taylor and Wake-up Thumbelina dolls.

By 1970, Ideal had outgrown its manufacturing complex in Hollis, Queens. The company wanted to build a new plant in College Point, Queens, but was unable to strike a deal with the Lindsay administration. The company opened a new facility in Newark, New Jersey, in the early 1970s, while continuing to operate its factory in Hollis.

In late 1971, Ideal joined the New York Stock Exchange. Valued at $71 million, it was one of the U.S.'s top three toy companies.

In 1979, a Hungarian inventor, Erno Rubik, pitched his Magic Cube to Ideal Toy Company. Ideal renamed it the Rubik's cube. The toy was sold in stores beginning in 1980. In May 1981, trying to maximize profits on the Rubik's Cube craze, Ideal filed civil suits against dozens of distributors and retailers selling knockoff cubes. The Rubik's Cube was inducted into the National Toy Hall of Fame in 2014.

Ideal had earnings of $3.7 million in fiscal year 1979–1980, but lost $15.5 million in fiscal year 1980–1981. Sales both years averaged around $150 million.

In May 1981, Joseph Winkler was named Ideal's president, succeeding Lionel Weintraub, who remained chairman and CEO.

In 1982, the company moved its headquarters from Hollis, Queens, to Harmon Meadow, New Jersey. It was sold to CBS Toys later that year for around $58 million.

In 1984, CBS sold Ideal to Viewmaster International, which renamed itself "View-Master Ideal" in the process.

In 1989, View-Master Ideal was bought by Tyco Toys of Mt. Laurel, New Jersey, for $43.9 million. The Ideal line remained part of Tyco until Tyco's merger with Mattel, Inc., in 1997.

Ideal's United Kingdom assets were sold to Hasbro, which has since released Mouse Trap, Buck-a-roo!, and KerPlunk under its MB Games brand. Other toys that originated with Ideal continue to be marketed and sold by other companies, including Rubik's Cube by Hasbro and Magic 8 Ball by Mattel.

=== 21st century ===
The Ideal trademarks, and most toy molds not purchased by Hasbro or Mattel, were purchased by Jay Horowitz, of American Plastic Equipment, who later transferred all rights to American Plastic Equipment's subsidiary, American Classic Toys. Mr. Horowitz licensed the trademark and toy rights to Plaza Toys, to be used on its Fiddlestix building sticks products, and eventually sold the mark and toy rights in January 2011, to Poof-Slinky.

In January 2014, the Ideal brand and toy rights became part of a new company, Alex Brands, after the May 2013 acquisition of Alex Toys by Propel Equity Partners.

In early 2019, Jay Horowitz of American Classic Toys entered into an exclusive license agreement with the Juna Group to represent worldwide select Ideal brands (not included in the sale to Poof-Slinky) in all categories outside of toys and playthings. In 2023, this license agreement was acquired from The Juna Group by CSN Press LLC, publishers of the weekly newspaper, Comic Shop News.

== Product lines ==
=== Toys and games ===
- Alexander's Star
- Alligator Game
- Astrobase
- Babar
- Batman Playset
- Battle Action Tank Trap
- Battlefield Blast
- Battling Spaceships
- Battling Tops
- Beat The "8" Ball
- Big Bird Storymagic
- Bing Bang Boing
- Boaterific
- Bongo Kongo
- Bop the Beetle
- Be a King or Queen outfit
- Buck-a-roo!
- Building Boards
- Checkpoint: Danger!
- Careful
- Captain Action and Action Boy
- Clancy the Great
- Comic Heroines (AKA Superqueen)
- Composa-Tune
- Cover-up
- Criss-Cross
- Crossfire
- Deduction
- Disney Dough
- Don't Tip The Waiter
- Don't Upset Me
- Dukes of Hazzard Racing Set
- Dr. Evil
- Electroman
- Electronic Detective
- Electronic Jet Pilot (Cockpit Instrument Panel)
- Escape from Skull Canyon
- Evel Knievel toys
- Fiddlestix
- Flintstones toys
- Fort Cheyenne
- Frontier Logs
- Game of the Generals
- Gaylord the Walking Bassett Hound
- Gunfight at OK Corral Playset
- Hand Puppets (DC Comics Superheroes i.e. Batman, Robin, Wonder Woman, TV Series Characters i.e. Mister Rogers' Neighborhood, The Addams Family, The Munsters)
- Hands Down
- Hang on Harvey
- Hoopla
- Howdy Doody doll
- Impact
- ITC Models
- The Game of Jaws
- Jay J. Armes action figure.
- Justice League of America Playset
- KerPlunk
- Kindles
- King Kong
- King Zor
- Lamb Chop puppet
- Magic 8 Ball
- Magic Shot
- Magilla Gorilla
- Maniac
- Manglor
- Marblehead
- Mark Three
- Mighty Mo
- Missing Link
- Model cars
- Monkey Stix
- Motorific
- Mr. Machine
- Mr. Rogers Neighborhood Trolley
- My Dog Has Fleas
- Odd Ogg
- Oh, Nuts!
- Pac-Man Panic
- Pay-Off
- Payoff Machine
- Peter Potamus
- Poison Ivy
- Poppin Hoppies
- Powermite Mini Tools
- Phantom Rayder Ship 1964
- R-r-r-raw Power
- Rack 'N' Roll Bowling
- Rebound
- Ricochet Rabbit & Droop-a-Long
- Robert the Robot
- Robo Force
- Robot Commando
- Rocks & Bugs & Things
- Rubik's Cube (license)
- Ryan Oakes Magic Show
- Scare Cycles
- Shaker Maker
- Skeeters (micro sized toy cars (12 different models plus carrying case and 2 track sets)
- Sky Battle
- Smokey the Bear Ranger
- Snap Bowling
- Solar Works
- Speedball (Electronic)
- Stretchie dolls
- Super City (toy)
- Sure Shot Baseball
- Swack!
- Tank Command
- Teddy Bear
- Think & Learn (Preschool play sets)
- ThunderStreak (hydro wing rubberband powered toy) 1967
- Tiger Island
- Tin Can Alley
- Tiny Mighty Mo
- Tornado Bowl
- Toss Across
- TCR: Total Control Racing
- Triple Up
- Up Against Time
- Upset
- U.S. Marine Air-Sea Rescue Floating Mechanical Seaplane
- U.S. Royal Giant Tire Mechanical Toy - from the New York World's Fair 1964
- Video Varmints
- Walt Disney toys
- Zeroids

=== Board games ===
- The $128,000 Question
- All-Pro Basketball National Basketball Association Game
- All-Pro Football National Football League Game
- All-Pro Hockey National Hockey League Game
- Bible Trivia
- Blast (The Game of Blast)
- Block The Clock
- The Chase
- Cloak & Dagger
- Crazy Clock Game * Crossfire
- The Diners' Club Credit Card Game
- Double Exposure
- Electra Woman and Dyna Girl (board game)
- Fish Bait
- The Fugitive
- The Generals (game)
- Get Smart
- The Great Escape
- The Hollywood Squares
- I Vant to Bite Your Finger
- Let's Make A Deal
- Mouse Trap
- Mystic Skull: The Game Of Voodoo
- Old Maid
- Pop O Matic Yipes!
- Rain Rain Go Away
- Rattle Me Bones
- Salvo
- The Sinking of The Titanic
- Solid Gold Music Trivia
- Ten Commandments
- Tic-Tac-Dough
- Tip-It
- The Winning Ticket
- Yipes!

=== Dolls ===
==== DeFilippo Dolls ====
- Baby Baby
- Baby Dreams — the doll with "velvet skin"
- Baby Tickle Tickle
- Betsy Wetsy
- Dorothy Hamill
- Evel Knievel toys
- Jody An Old Fashioned Girl (1979)
- Joey Stivic
- KaMy Bottle Baby
- Karen & her magic carriage
- Lazy Dazy (1970s)
- Magic Hair Crissy
- Movin Groovin Cricket/Tressy
- Patti Playpal
- Rub-a-Dub Doggie
- Rub-a-Dub Dolly
- Sara Stimson/Shirley Temple
- Spinderella Flatsy dolls
- Tearie Betsy Wetsy
- Tiffany Taylor
- Tiny Tears (after 1968 when American Character Doll Company went out of business)
- Tippy Tumbles (American Character Doll Company)
- Tuesday Taylor and Taylor Jones
- Upsy Dazy
- Wake up Thumbelina
- Zem 21 & Knight of Darkness

==== Other Ideal dolls ====
- Bibsy — 23" baby doll (1960s and 1970s)
- Bye Bye Baby (1960s)
- Captain Action (1966–1968)
- Cream Puff Baby (1950s)
- Crissy — fashion doll with growing hair feature
- Crown Princess— 10" vinyl glamour doll
- Deanna Durbin
- Dick Tracy — including Bonnie Braids and Sparkle Plenty
- Flatsy dolls — flat vinyl dolls in two sizes: tall "model" dolls and smaller childlike dolls; many had blue, pink and other bright hair colors; came in picture frame packaging
- Flexy — composition head and hands, wooden body and feet, and posable tubular wire mesh arms and legs
- Flossie Flirt — composition (1920s and 1930s)
- Hugee Girl baby dolls (1950s)
- Harmony
- I Love Lucy 28 inch Rag Doll (1950s) - a rare promotional give-away in partnership with Philip Morris Company, NY
- Jane Withers
- Jelly Belly
- Judy Garland — part of publicity for original theatrical release of The Wizard of Oz (1939/1940)
- Kissy doll
- Little Lost Baby — three faces: happy, sad, sleeping, also with sounds; "I'm Little Lost Baby. You can make me happy!" (1968)
- Little Miss Revlon — 10" vinyl glamour doll, advertising tie-in with Revlon cosmetics
- Lolly doll
- Magic Lips
- Mama doll
- Petite Princess Fantasy — dollhouse furniture
- Playpal dolls: Patti, Penny, Suzi, Bonnie, Johnny, Peter, Daddy's Girl
- Playtex Dryper Baby
- Princess Patti Fantasy — dollhouse furniture
- Sara Ann
- Saucy Walker
- Shirley Temple
- Snookie dolls (Pete & Repete)
- Snuggles dolls
- Tammy
- The Wonderful Wizard of Oz (1986)
- Thirsty Baby doll (1960s)
- Thumbelina
- Toni — hard plastic doll, advertising tie-in with Toni Home Permanent
- Tressy — one of the Gro-Hair dolls
- Uneeda Kid — early composition doll, advertising tie-in with Uneeda Biscuit Co.

== Trivia ==
- The title of AC/DC's single "Thunderstruck" was inspired by the ThunderStreak, which used to be Angus and Malcolm Young's favourite childhood toy.
