= Tressy =

Fashion doll

- Type: Fashion doll
- Invented by: Jesse and Diana Dean
- Company: American Character Doll Company; Ideal Toy Company
- Country: United States
- Availability: 1963–1972
- Features: adjustable-length hair

Tressy was an American fashion doll with a feature to adjust the length of its hair. Tressy was first produced by American Character Doll Company in the 1960s and later by Ideal Toy Company in the 1970s. The doll was invented and patented by modern furniture designer Jesse Dean and his wife, Diana.

== Description ==
"Tressy" was trademarked in 1963 as a doll with "hair that grows" by the American Character Toy Company of New York. It was first sold as an 11½" fashion doll similar to Mattel's Barbie and by the late 60s as a larger preteen doll by the Ideal Toy Company. Tressy featured a long swatch of hair that could be pulled out of the top of the doll's head by pushing a button on the doll's midriff; that mechanism allowed children the ability to comb the hair in a variety of styles. American Character clearly intended that Tressy's "growing" hair feature would give the doll a marketing edge over its blockbuster competitor, Barbie.

== History ==
=== American Character Doll Company ===
In 1963, after approaching Ideal Toy Company with his concept and being rejected, inventor Jesse Dean sold the doll to American Character Doll Company, where it was popular from the outset, selling into its retirement in 1965. Unlike Mattel, which maintained sole manufacturing and global distribution rights on its bestselling Barbie doll, American Character allowed the Regal Toy Company of Canada to manufacture and sell its own version of Tressy which had heavier eye and facial makeup. There was also a Palitoy Tressy sold in the United Kingdom, Señorita Lilí a Mexican version of Tressy sold by Lili Ledy, and a Bella Tressy made and marketed by Societe Bella in France. In Spain it was made and distributed by Novo Gama.

"Cricket" was marketed by the American Character Doll Co. in 1964. as Tressy's cousin.

=== Ideal Toy Company ===
In 1968, American Character filed for bankruptcy, and Ideal acquired its dyes, patents, and trademarks. Ideal used both trademarks Tressy and Cricket on their own products in the 1970s. The Ideal Toy Company version of the Tressy doll was an 18" fashion doll introduced in the year 1970 as "Gorgeous Tressy" and in 1971 as "Posin' Tressy". The Ideal Tressy Doll was specially produced for and sold only by Sears, Roebuck & Company and is considered by some collectors to be part of the Crissy "family" of dolls. She was advertised next to Crissy in Sears catalogs and like the Crissy Doll, Ideal Tressy's major appeal was her "growing-hair" feature. Tressy was pictured in Sears catalogs modeling exclusive Sears catalog outfits created for her and the Crissy Doll. However, Crissy Doll fashion packages do not mention the Ideal Tressy Doll as they do Crissy's companion dolls, the Kerry doll and the Brandi Doll.

==== Gorgeous Tressy ====
In 1970, Ideal's "Gorgeous Tressy" came dressed in a yellow and white geometric print dress and panties with black bow tie shoes. This same issue can also be found in an orange and white dress variation. This issue was released with a straight body in a white or black version. Tressy's Caucasian version had black hair and blue eyes, and the African American version had black hair and brown eyes.

==== Posin' Tressy ====
Ideal's "Posin' Tressy" was released in 1971 (white-only) with the Posin' body style, meaning the doll had a swivel waist that had limited movement in both the horizontal and vertical planes so the doll could strike various poses for the child at play. In 1971, Posin' Tressy could be purchased wearing a belted turquoise, satin and white lace long-sleeved mini dress and panties with matching bow tie shoes. In 1972, Sears also offered the "Posin' Tressy" doll in a special gift set. This was a satin wedding dress set that coordinated with the bridesmaid dress set also available with the Cricket doll.

==== Cricket ====
In 1971, Ideal released 16-inch tall "Posin' Cricket" with copper-colored hair, brown sleep eyes and featuring the Posin' body style. Like Tressy, Cricket was produced for and sold only by Sears, Roebuck & Company.
