= Woman Kills Injured Man =

1994 painting by Odd Nerdrum

- Artist: Odd Nerdrum
- Year: 1994
- Medium: Oil on canvas
- Dimensions: 178 cm × 265 cm (70 in × 104 in)
- Location: Astrup Fearnley Museum of Modern Art; Oslo

Woman Kills Injured Man (Norwegian: Kvinne dreper skadet mann) is a 1994 painting by the Norwegian artist Odd Nerdrum. It depicts a man who is assaulted by a woman armed with a knife.

== Display ==
The painting was accepted into the 1994 Autumn Exhibition. Art critic Jan Kokkin noted the characteristic Odd Nerdrum style of the work, but also added that it was "somewhat anatomically dubious, with the artificially protruding right shoulder of the man". Both Kokkin and Harald Flor noted the symbiosis between Nerdrum's work and Thomas Saenger's photo art Persona.

Following lengthy negotiations with Nerdrum's agent, the painting was bought by the Astrup Fearnley Museum of Modern Art in Oslo in 1996, together with Nerdrum's Wanderer Imitates a Cloud from 1990. They were then exhibited as part of a selected works collection. The painting is still in the collections of the Astrup Fearnley Museum.

== Description ==
In a dark, rocky coastal landscape, a nude man with open mouth and twisted arms is falling headlong toward the ground. A nude woman armed with a knife is hanging in the air, falling over the man or clinging to his leg. In the background to the right are three additional people who observe the two in the foreground.

== Themes ==
The subject of a man and a woman in lethal struggle recurs in several of Nerdrum's paintings from the 1990s, such as Buried Alive from 1996. In his 1998 book Odd Nerdrum: Storyteller and Self-Revealer, the art historian and Nerdrum scholar Jan Åke Pettersson interprets Woman Kills Injured Man through a personal crisis Nerdrum had gone through. In the mid 1980s Nerdrum had a relationship with a female student. He left his family for her, but was rejected when she was accepted to the Norwegian National Academy of Fine Arts. As a reaction, Nerdrum went to her home and slashed the paintings he had given her. According to Pettersson, this episode is also reflected in paintings such as Woman with Fish, Mann med steinbit and Man Bitten by a Snake.
