= Driver's Seat (sculpture) =

Sculpture in Portland, Oregon, U.S.

- The sculpture in 2020
- Artist: Don Merkt
- Year: 1994
- Type: Sculpture
- Medium: Galvanized steel
- Location: Portland, Oregon, United States; 45°31′41″N 122°40′33″W

Driver's Seat is a 1994 galvanized steel sculpture by Don Merkt, installed along the Transit Mall in Portland, Oregon's Old Town Chinatown neighborhood, in the United States. The artwork was funded by the City of Portland's Percent for Art program, the Portland Development Commission, and TriMet, and remains part of the City of Portland and Multnomah County Public Art Collection courtesy of the Regional Arts & Culture Council.

== Description ==
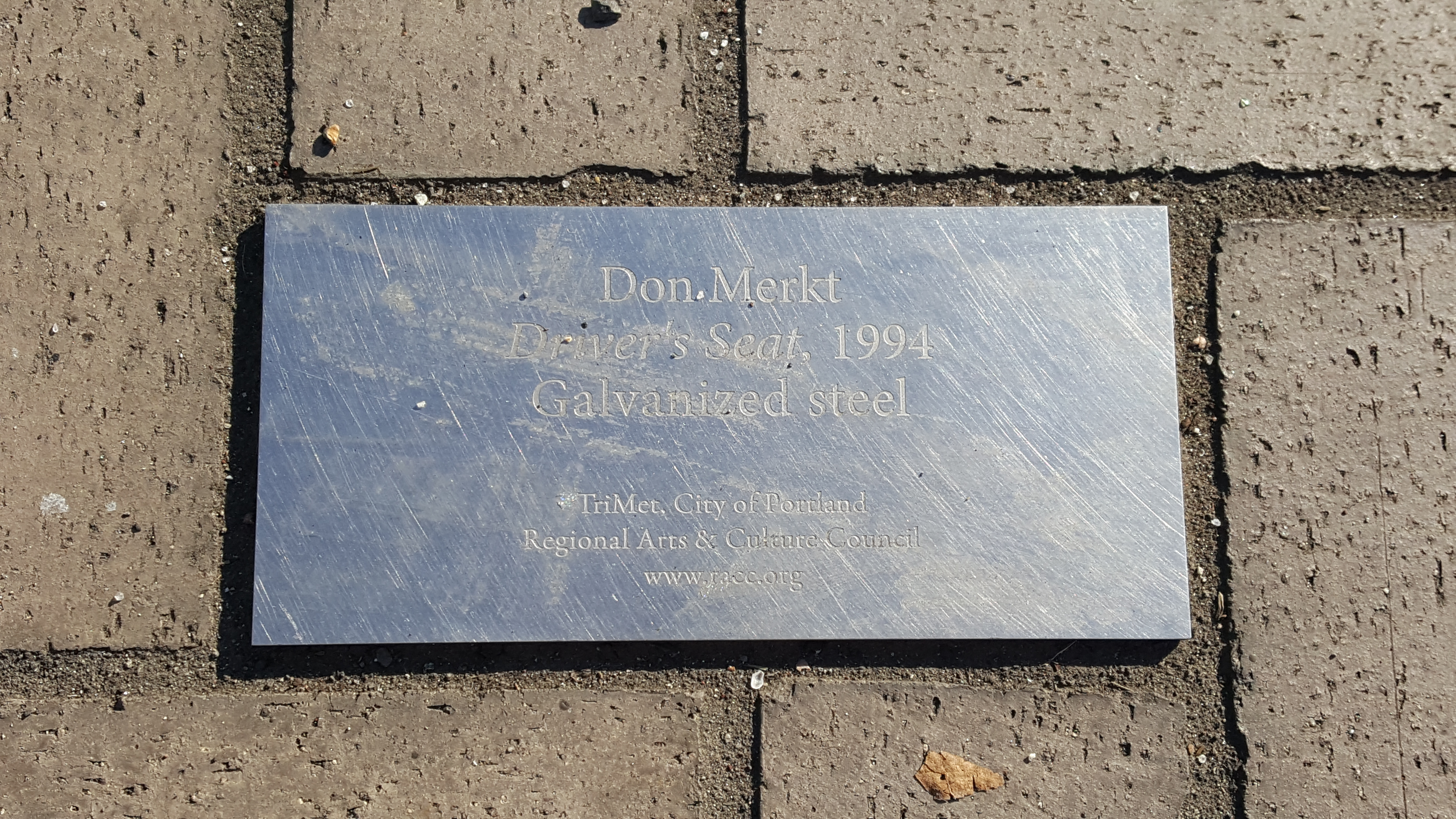
Plaque, 2020

The galvanized steel sculpture by Don Merkt is installed at the intersection of Northwest 5th Avenue and Irving Street has been, along the Transit Mall in Old Town Chinatown. It has described as a "large abstracted eye" that focuses on Portland Union Station's clock tower, "or more metaphorically time". The artwork measures 10 feet (3.0 m) x 27 feet (8.2 m) and is categorized by the Smithsonian Institution as both abstract and architectural. Behind the eye's iris is a steering wheel and seat, accessible to visitors. The seat's reverse is an inverted replica of the clock face. Merkt has described the work as being about "social responsibility and that shared sensation of steering something greater than yourself through time, whether it be a bus, a family, a community or a culture. The sculpture can be seen as a collective 'I' or 'eye', a living populist sculpture that cameos whoever takes the wheel."

== History ==
The artwork was funded by the City of Portland's Percent for Art program, the Portland Development Commission, and TriMet. It was relocated from the east side of 5th Avenue to the west side in 2008, due to Transit Mall work. The sculpture remains part of the City of Portland and Multnomah County Public Art Collection courtesy of the Regional Arts & Culture Council.

== See also ==
- 1994 in art
- Architectural sculpture in the United States
