= Tin Can Alley (game) =

Children's electronic shooting game

Tin Can Alley is an inexpensive electronic shooting game for children. It uses infrared technology embedded inside a small plastic pistol or rifle. The objective is to aim at a mark below a selection of small tin cans perched upon a plastic wall. Successfully aiming at the marks below each of the cans causes the can to "pop off".

The game is based on a popular UK carnival game of the same name, which involves throwing bean bags at tin cans to knock them down. Both the electronic and carnival game are named for Tin Pan Alley, a name for a collection of New York City songwriters and music publishers, as well as the name of the Manhattan location where many of the songwriters and publishers worked.
