= American Character Doll Company =

American Toy Company

- Founded: 1919
- Founders: Jacob Brock, Max Brock, Ed Schaefaer
- Defunct: 1968
- Fate: Bankruptcy
- Successor: Ideal Toy Company
- Headquarters: New York City, United States
- Key people: Secretary: Eva Brock (Jacob’s wife), Bookkeeper: Herbert (Jacob's son), Engineer: Harvey (Max's son)
- Products: dolls

The American Character Doll Company was an American toy company specializing in dolls. Their most popular dolls included "Tiny Tears," "Tressy," "Butterball Doll", "Sweet Sue," and "Toodles." Founded in 1919, the company's fortunes peaked in the mid-20th century, as they sold millions of dolls exclusively to retailers and mail-order houses such as Sears and Montgomery Ward. The company was the first to produce mass-marketed rubber dolls in the United States. American Character Dolls went bankrupt in 1968, with their assets acquired by the Ideal Toy Company.

== History ==
=== Corporate history ===
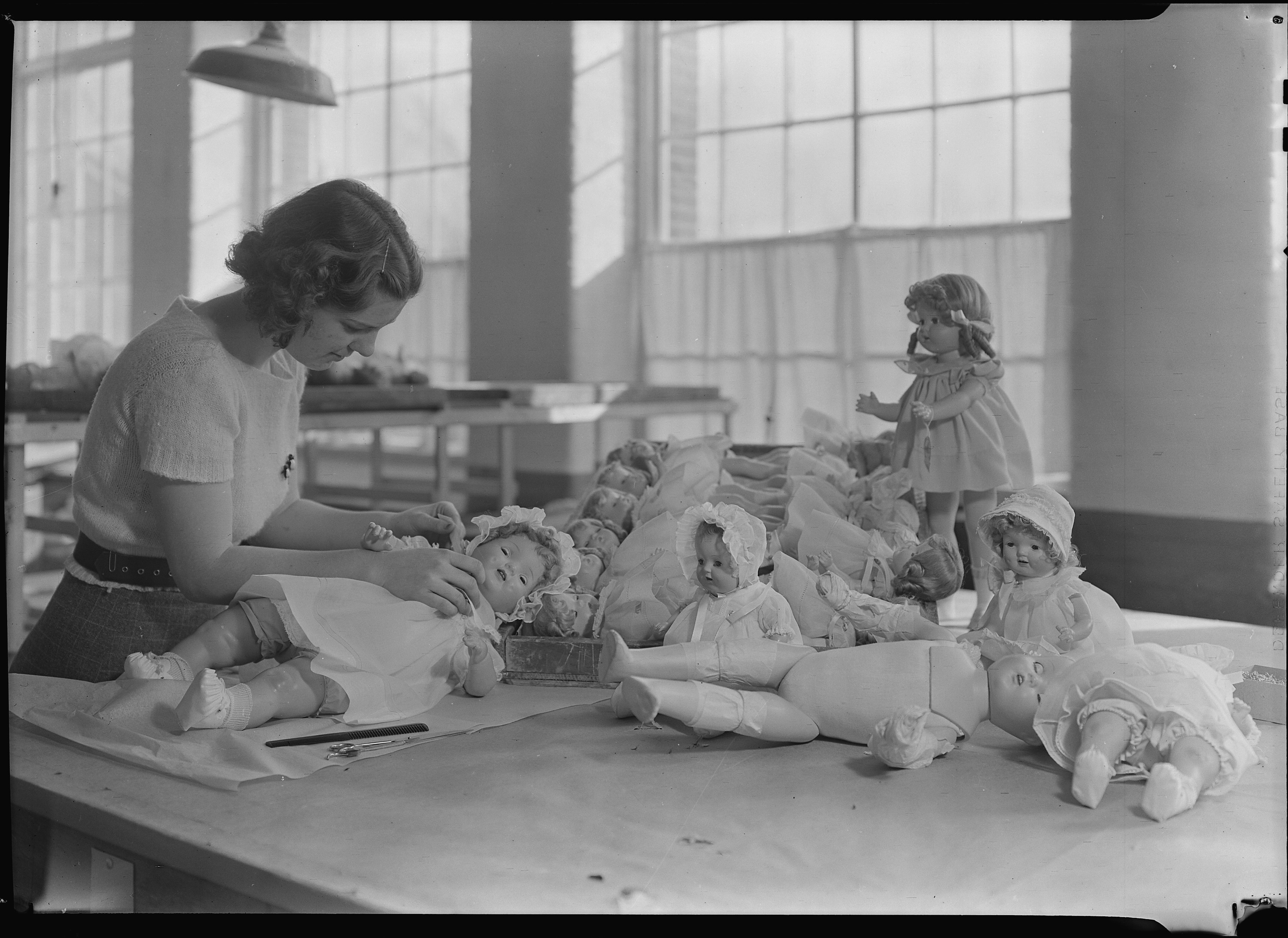
Dressing and packing dolls at Paragon Manufacturing Company in Easthampton, Massachusetts (1937)

The American Doll and Toy Corporation was established in 1919 by Russian Jewish immigrant brothers Jacob and Max Brock, and their partner Ed Schaefaer, with many of the Brock relatives occupying key positions at the company. The company used the trade names "Aceedeecee" and "ACDC". American Character Dolls' factory was in Brooklyn; the company operated a store on East 17th Street in New York City in the late 1920s. By the late 1930s, the company's manufacturing plant, comprising 130,000 square feet, was in Easthampton, Massachusetts.

The company made the news in 1937 when it was ordered by the Federal Trade Commission to stop claiming that its patented "paratex" (a hard rubber made from a "secret formula") was superior to composition dolls (popularly made by American Character's competitor the Ideal Toy Company).

In 1951, American Character partnered with competitors the Ideal Toy Company and the Alexander Doll Company to establish the United States-Israeli Toy and Plastic Corporation, designed to produce material for toys in Israel and the U.S. The new corporation's offices shared space with American Character.

In 1954, American Character Dolls established a $2,000 annual fellowship at Teachers College, Columbia University, known as the Frances Horwich Graduate Fellowship in Early Childhood Education. In 1954, the company was awarded a patent for a doll that "breathes, sheds tears, drinks from a bottle, blows bubbles, and even smokes."

By 1967 the company's fortunes were in decline, with unsecured claims of approximately $1.4 million. Settlements were arranged in March and June 1967, and the company continued to operate on a limited scale. Shortly after that, in 1968, American Character Dolls filed for bankruptcy and went out of business. Molds for some toys were sold to Mattel and Ideal Toy Company, which acquired the defunct company's dyes, patents, and trademarks.

=== Product history ===
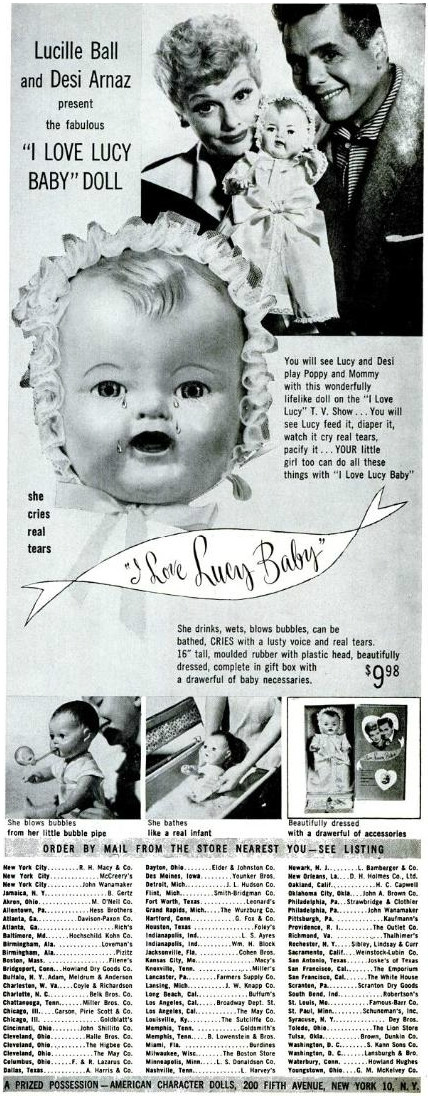
I Love Lucy baby doll, introduced in 1952

American Character dolls were thought to be well-made, with good-quality costumes. Early dolls were made of composition; one of their first lines of mother and character dolls was introduced in 1923 and called "Petite;" they remained popular into the 1930s.

The Puggy and Sally Campbell Kids children dolls were introduced in 1928; they were based on the cartoon characters designed by Grace Drayton.

American Character released a limited number of celebrity dolls over the years, beginning with "Lucky Aviation Kid" in 1927, a Charles Lindbergh doll wearing a brown aviator suit and flight cap, with a Spirit of St. Louis model plane ribbon, white socks and brown shoes. In the 1930s, the company released the celebrity doll "Carol Ann Beery," based on the child actress of the same name. The Kathryn Grayson autographed celebrity doll was produced in the late 1940s.

American Character switched their formula from composition to their branded "Paratex" in the mid-1930s.

Celebrity dolls released in the 1950s included Alice In Wonderland (1952), "Annie Oakley" (1954), "Eloise," and a series of I Love Lucy dolls (1952), the most popular of which was the baby doll later known as "Little Ricky." The 14" vinyl doll came dressed in a flannel gown and cried "real tears." (In 1952 stars Lucille Ball and husband Desi Arnaz were expecting a child.)

American Character's most popular doll was Tiny Tears, introduced in 1950 and remaining in production throughout the company's existence. The baby doll's distinguishing feature was her ability to shed tears from two tiny holes on either side of her nose when her stomach was pressed after being filled with water from her baby bottle. Tiny Tears became one of the most popular dolls of the 1950s, due in part to television ads featuring a young Patty Duke that aired on popular children's shows such as the highly influential Ding Dong School with Frances Horwich.

"Sweet Sue," introduced in 1951, was popular throughout the decade into the early 1960s. A pre-teen plastic doll, she came in a variety of sizes. In 1957, American Character marketed "Sweet Sue Sophisticate," a 14" or 20" fashion doll. The "Toodles" multi-jointed plastic doll — able to "kneel, sit, play and assume 1,000 different positions" — was introduced in 1955 and became a big seller for American Character, including its associated products like "Toodles Toddler" (1955-1959), "Teeny Toodles" (1959-1960), and "Tommy Toodles" (1959-1960). "Toni," released in 1958, was a fashion doll for Toni hair products, sold by Gillette. Toni, also marketed as "Cha Cha" or "High Society," was popular into the 1960s.

Tressy, introduced in 1963, was a fashion doll with a feature to adjust the length of its hair. Modern furniture designer Jesse Dean and his wife, Diana, invented and patented the doll. It was first sold as an 11½" fashion doll similar to Mattel's Barbie. Tressy featured a long swatch of hair that could be pulled out of the top of the doll's head by pushing a button on the doll's midriff; that mechanism allowed children to comb the hair in various styles. American Character intended that Tressy's "growing" hair feature would give the doll a marketing edge over its blockbuster competitor, Barbie. Tressy was popular from the outset, selling into its retirement in 1965. Unlike Mattel, which maintained sole manufacturing and global distribution rights on its bestselling Barbie doll, American Character allowed the Regal Toy Company of Canada to manufacture and sell its version of Tressy, which had a heavier eye and facial makeup. There was also a Palitoy Tressy sold in the United Kingdom and a Bella Tressy made and marketed by Societe Bella in France. "Cricket" was marketed by the American Character Doll Co. in 1964 as Tressy's cousin.

American Character focused on talking dolls in the early 1960s, with such models as "Little Miss Echo" (1962-1964), "Baby Babbles" (1963), and "Baby Says," (1963). The only celebrity dolls American Character released in the 1960s were the Cartwright Family (1966), based on Bonanza.

The company's final big product launches were "Whimsies" (1960–1961), a line of dolls with names like Bashful Bride, Dixie the Pixie, Fanny (an angel), Hedda Get Bedda (a multi-face doll with three faces), Hilda the Hillbilly, Lena the Cleaner, Miss Take, Monk, Polly the Lady Raggie, Simon, Strong Man, Suzie the Snoozie, Tillie the Talker, Wheeler Dealer, Zack the Sack, and Zero the Hero (a football player); and "Tiny Whimsies" (1966), a line of 7-1/2" dolls with names like Lites Out (nightgown), I'm Yours (bride), Fly with Me (witch), Swing It (dancer), Love Me (red pantsuit), and I'm Hooked (groom); and a line of 6" dolls with names like Pixie, Swinger, Granny, Lites out, Minnie Mod, Jump'n, and Go-Go.

== Dolls manufactured by American Character ==
=== 1920s ===
- Baby Petite/Teenie Weenie (1925) — 11"-15" baby doll also known as "Bye-Lo" or "Tynie Baby"
- Bottletot (1926) — 14" baby doll, also marketed as "Happy Tot," "Marvel Tot," and "Toddle Tot"
- Campbell Kids (1928–1929) — 12" dolls designed by Grace Drayton, sometimes called "Dolly Dingle" after the paper dolls also designed by Drayton. It came in two versions: "Sally" and "Puggy"
- Lucky Aviation Kid (1927) — 14" Charles Lindbergh doll
- Mama / Petite (1922–1930s) — line of mother and character dolls varying in size from 12"-24"; also known as "Wonder Baby"

=== 1930s ===
- Smiling Sally (1930s) — came in 12," 15," or 16" versions
- Sally Joy (1930s) — 18-24" doll
- Carol Ann Beery (1935) — 13-1/2" or 16" doll
- Sally Jane (1936-1938) —15," 17," 19," and 22"-tall Shirley Temple look-a-like doll made from "Paratex"

=== 1940s ===
- Little Love (1942-1947) — 15", 18" Bye-Lo Baby or Tynie Baby look-a-like
- Pre Sweet Sue (1947) — 17-18" doll; later made into Kathryn Grayson autographed celebrity doll

=== 1950s ===
- Alice In Wonderland (1952) — 18" doll; essentially Sweet Sue in a blue dress with white pinafore
- Annie Oakley (1954) — 15-25" doll; essentially Sweet Sue in an outfit of green denim culottes, matching bolero, satin blouse, and scarf, felt hat, holster with two guns and cowboy boots
- Baby Sue (1957) — 17" or 23" hard plastic doll
- Betsy McCall (1957-1959) — 8"-36" hard plastic doll; also marketed as her "cousin" Sandy McCall
- Chuckles (1952-1961) — 18-19, 22" vinyl doll
- Eloise (1958-1959) — 21" cloth doll named after the series of children's books by Kay Thompson and Hilary Knight
- Life Size Sweet Sue (1955-1956) — 24" and 31" doll
- I Love Lucy Baby (1952–1956) — baby doll later known as "Little Ricky"
- I Love Lucy Lucille Ball (1952) — 28" cloth doll with a hard plastic painted face, red bangs showing beneath her kerchief, big blue eyes, wearing her red and white striped blouse, an apron with "I Love Lucy" printed on it, with two heart-shaped pockets and red peddle pusher pants
- I Love Lucy Ricky (1953–1955) — vinyl doll with molded hair and sleep eyes in various outfits
- Jimmy John (1954) — 18" "magic skin" doll that cooed when the tummy was pressed
- Sweet Sue (1951-1961) — 14," 15," 18"-21", 24," and 31" pre-teen plastic doll
- Sweet Sue Sophisticate (1957) — 14" or 20" fashion doll
- Teeny Toodles (1959-1960) — 11" vinyl five-piece-jointed doll
- Tiny Tears (1950–1968) — "crying" baby doll in 11-1/2," 13 1/2," 16," and 20" sizes
- Tommy Toodles (1959-1960) — 22-23" doll marketed as Toodles' brother
- Toni (1958–1960s) — 10," 14," 20," and 25" fashion doll for Toni hair products (Gillette) made from the same face mold as Sweet Sue Sophisticate; also marketed as "Cha Cha" or "High Society"
- Toodles (1955-1960s) — 19-30" plastic multi-jointed doll
- Toodles Toddler (1955-1959) — 19-1/2", 21," and 24" vinyl multi-jointed doll also known as "Toodles The Action Doll"

=== 1960s ===
- Baby Babbles (1963) — 23" doll with a foam-covered voice box that says phrases
- Baby Says (1963) — 17" speaking doll with eleven different phrases (battery-operated)
- Butterball (1961) — 19" or 23" soft vinyl Magi-form doll
- Cartwright Family (1966) — 8" celebrity dolls from Bonanza: Ben, Hoss, Little Joe, and Adam
- Chuckles (1961) — big girl doll
- Cricket (1964) — fashion with growing hair feature; Tressy's "cousin" also known as "Toots"
- Little Miss Echo (1962-1964) — 30" hard plastic talker doll with a battery-operated tape recorder
- Mary Makeup (1964) — Tressy's friend without the grow-hair feature
- Mini-Whimsies (1966) — 6- 7 1/2" molded vinyl line of dolls; successor to Whimsies
- Popi (1963) — 11" pop-apart fashion doll with three separate wigs and a cut-and-drape non-sew dress
- Pouty Penny (1966) — 13," 20," or 22" baby doll also marketed as "Freckles"
- Pre-Teen (1963) — 14" grow-hair vinyl doll with a button on the tummy that enabled the doll's hair to grow or retract; only made in 1963, then was discontinued to make way for Tressy
- Sally Says (1963-1965) — 18"-19" vinyl toddler doll with a battery-operated talker
- Snip n' Tuck (1966) — mannequin Popi doll in a frame, with fabric and accessories for children to design and make their non-sew clothing
- Suzie the Snoozie (1960) — 22" sleeping doll
- Teenie Tiny Tears (1964) — 12" doll
- Tiny Whimsies (1966)
- Toodle-Loo (1961) — 17-18" magic foam fully jointed vinyl doll
- Tressy (1963–1967) — fashion doll with growing hair feature; also marketed as "Magic Makeup Tressy" and "Black Magic Makeup Tressy"
- Whimsies (1960–1961)
