= Oasis discography =

Discography of English rock band Oasis

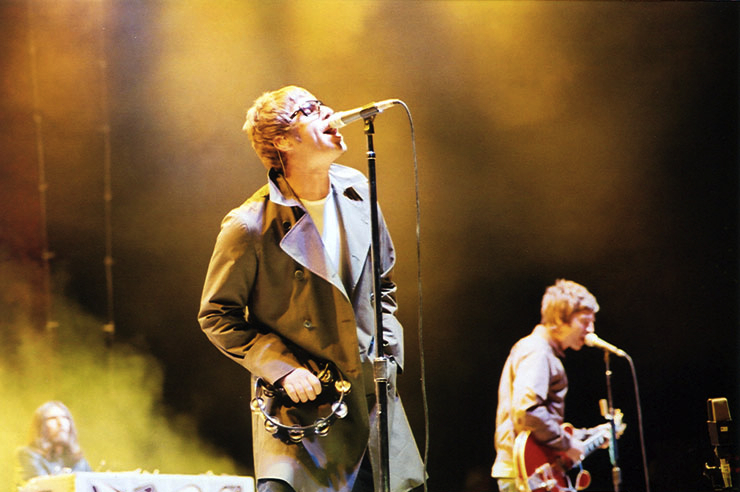
- Oasis performing in San Diego, California in September 2005
- Studio albums: 7
- Live albums: 2
- Compilation albums: 3
- Singles: 27
- Video albums: 6
- Music videos: 39
- EPs: 2
- Promotional singles: 19
- Box sets: 3

The English rock band Oasis have released seven studio albums, two live albums, three compilation albums, six video albums, two extended plays, twenty seven singles which includes one double single, nineteen promotional singles and thirty-six music videos. By 2026, the band had sold over 100 million records worldwide, making them one of the best-selling music artists of all time, and been named by Guinness World Records as the most successful act in the United Kingdom between 1995 and 2005. Oasis had 22 consecutive UK top 10 hits between 1994 and 2008. Oasis were formed in 1991 by vocalist Liam Gallagher, guitarist Paul "Bonehead" Arthurs, bassist Paul "Guigsy" McGuigan and drummer Tony McCarroll – they were later joined by guitarist and songwriter Noel Gallagher. The band signed to Creation Records in May 1993 and released their debut single "Supersonic" the following year; it peaked at number 31 in the United Kingdom. Follow-up singles "Shakermaker" and "Live Forever" became UK top 15 hits, with the latter also attaining success in the United States. Definitely Maybe, the band's debut studio album, topped the UK Albums Chart and went on to be certified ten times platinum by the British Phonographic Industry (BPI).

Oasis released their second studio album (What's the Story) Morning Glory? in October 1995. It was a huge commercial success, topping the charts in the UK and in multiple other countries, including Australia, Canada and Ireland. The album produced four singles, including the band's first UK number-one single "Some Might Say" and the international hits "Wonderwall" and "Don't Look Back in Anger". (What's the Story) Morning Glory? has sold over 22 million copies worldwide, which makes it one of the best-selling albums of all-time. The album was certified eighteen times platinum by the BPI and is the third best-selling album (best-selling studio album along with Sgt Pepper's Lonely Hearts Club Band by the Beatles) of all time in the UK, with sales of over 5.4 million copies in the country. The band's third studio album Be Here Now was released to great anticipation in August 1997. While the album topped the charts in several countries and became the fastest-selling album in British history, it failed to match the commercial success of Morning Glory, ultimately selling around ten million copies worldwide. Two of the album's singles, "D'You Know What I Mean?" and "All Around the World", peaked at number one in the UK.

Oasis' fourth studio album Standing on the Shoulder of Giants was released in February 2000, reaching number one in the UK and Ireland. Though not as commercially successful as its predecessors, Standing on the Shoulder of Giants managed to receive a double platinum certification from the BPI and featured three UK top five singles: "Go Let It Out", "Who Feels Love?" and "Sunday Morning Call". Heathen Chemistry followed in July 2002, becoming Oasis' fifth consecutive number-one album in the UK and being certified four times platinum by the BPI. Don't Believe the Truth, released in May 2005, topped the UK Albums Chart and produced the number-one singles "Lyla" and "The Importance of Being Idle". In November 2006, the band released a compilation album, Stop the Clocks, which peaked at number two in the UK and was preceded by the release of an EP of the same name. Oasis released their seventh studio album Dig Out Your Soul in October 2008; it continued the band's streak of number-one studio albums in the UK and was certified double platinum by the BPI by the end of the year. Following the release of Dig Out Your Soul and Noel Gallagher's departure from the band in August 2009, Oasis announced their break-up. In June 2010, a retrospective compilation album of the band's singles entitled Time Flies... 1994–2009 was released, peaking at number one in the UK.

== Albums ==
=== Studio albums ===
List of studio albums, with selected chart positions, sales figures and certifications
Title	Album details	Peak chart positions										Sales	Certifications
Title	Album details	UK	AUS	CAN	FRA	GER	IRL	JPN	SWE	SWI	US	Sales	Certifications
Definitely Maybe	Released: 29 August 1994; Label: Creation; Formats: CD, cassette, LP, MiniDisc	1	10 (Note: Definitely Maybe originally peaked at number 23 in Australia in 1995. Its 30th anniversary edition reached number 10 in 2024.)	—	20	5	3	34	4	7	58	WW: 16,000,000 (Note: Worldwide sales as of August 2024); UK: 3,000,000 (Note: Sales as of October 2016); US: 1,500,000	BPI: 10× Platinum; ARIA: 2× Platinum; IFPI SWE: Gold; IFPI SWI: Gold; MC: Platinum; RIAA: Platinum; RIAJ: Platinum; SNEP: 2× Gold
(What's the Story) Morning Glory?	Released: 2 October 1995 (UK); Label: Creation; Formats: CD, cassette, LP, MiniDisc	1	1	1	8	3	1	8	1	1	4	WW: 23,000,000 (Note: Worldwide sales as of December 2008); UK: 5,700,000 (Note: Sales as of April 2025); US: 5,500,000 (Note: Sales as of July 2025)	BPI: 19× Platinum; ARIA: 9× Platinum; BVMI: Gold; IFPI SWE: Platinum; IFPI SWI: Gold; IRMA: 6× Platinum; MC: 8× Platinum; RIAA: 4× Platinum; RIAJ: Platinum; SNEP: Platinum
Be Here Now	Released: 21 August 1997 (UK); Label: Creation; Formats: CD, cassette, LP, MiniDisc	1	1	1	1	2	1	3	1	2	2	WW: 10,000,000; UK: 2,100,000 (Note: Sales as of January 2022); US: 1,013,000	BPI: 7× Platinum; ARIA: Platinum; BVMI: Gold; IFPI SWE: Platinum; IFPI SWI: Gold; MC: 2× Platinum; RIAA: Platinum; RIAJ: 2× Platinum; SNEP: 2× Gold
Standing on the Shoulder of Giants	Released: 28 February 2000 (UK); Label: Big Brother; Formats: CD, cassette, LP, MiniDisc	1	6	8	6	5	1	4	3	3	24	WW: 3,500,000; UK: 600,000; US: 208,000 (Note: Sales as of January 2009)	BPI: 2× Platinum; IFPI SWE: Gold; IFPI SWI: Gold; RIAJ: Platinum
Heathen Chemistry	Released: 1 July 2002 (UK); Label: Big Brother; Formats: CD, cassette, LP	1	4	5	8	4	1	3	2	1	23	WW: 6,000,000; UK: 1,200,000 (Note: Sales as of January 2022); US: 154,000	BPI: 4× Platinum; ARIA: Gold; IFPI SWE: Gold; IFPI SWI: Gold; MC: Gold; RIAJ: Platinum
Don't Believe the Truth	Released: 30 May 2005 (UK); Label: Big Brother; Formats: CD, LP, digital download	1	5	3	5	2	1	1	3	3	12	WW: 7,000,000; UK: 1,000,000; US: 202,000	BPI: 3× Platinum; ARIA: Gold; IRMA: 2× Platinum; MC: Gold; RIAJ: Gold
Dig Out Your Soul	Released: 6 October 2008 (UK); Label: Big Brother; Formats: CD, LP, digital download	1	5	5	4	8	2	2	8	2	5	WW: 3,000,000; UK: 600,000; US: 116,000	BPI: 2× Platinum; RIAJ: Gold
"—" denotes a recording that did not chart or was not released in that territory.

=== Live albums ===
List of live albums, with selected chart positions, sales figures and certifications
Title	Album details	Peak chart positions										Sales	Certifications
Title	Album details	UK	AUS	AUT	FRA	GER	IRL	JPN	NOR	SWI	US	Sales	Certifications
Familiar to Millions	Released: 13 November 2000 (UK); Label: Big Brother; Formats: CD, cassette, LP, MD	5	86	49	51	57	10	13	38	63	182	UK: 362,368 (Note: Sales as of November 2021); US: 68,000 (Note: Sales as of April 2002)	BPI: Platinum; RIAJ: Gold
Knebworth 1996	Released: 19 November 2021 (UK); Label: Big Brother; Formats: Box set, CD, LP, streaming	4	87	23	63	15	7	9	—	19	—		BPI: Gold; SNEP: Gold

=== Compilation albums ===
List of compilation albums, with selected chart positions, sales figures and certifications
Title	Album details	Peak chart positions										Certifications
Title	Album details	UK	AUS	CAN	FRA	GER	IRL	JPN	SWE	SWI	US	Certifications
The Masterplan	Released: 2 November 1998; Label: Creation; Formats: CD, cassette, LP, MD	2	36	11	20	33	3	5	20	40	51	BPI: 3× Platinum; MC: Gold; RIAJ: Platinum
Stop the Clocks	Released: 20 November 2006; Label: Big Brother; Formats: CD, LP, digital download	2	34	—	127	54	2	1	29	19	89	BPI: 5× Platinum; ARIA: Gold; IRMA: 4× Platinum; MC: Gold; RIAJ: Gold
Time Flies... 1994–2009	Released: 14 June 2010; Label: Big Brother; Formats: CD, LP, digital download	1	50	49	—	21	1	2	44	19	131	BPI: 8× Platinum; ARIA: Gold; RIAJ: Gold
"—" denotes a recording that did not chart or was not released in that territory.

=== Video albums ===
List of video albums, with selected chart positions and certifications
Title	Album details	Peak chart positions				Certifications
Title	Album details	UK Video	AUS	JPN	US Video	Certifications
Live by the Sea	Released: 28 August 1995 (JPN); Label: Epic; Formats: VHS, VCD, LaserDisc	1	—	—	—	BPI: 3× Platinum; ARIA: Gold
...There and Then	Released: 14 October 1996 (UK); Label: Epic; Formats: VHS, LaserDisc	1	—	—	7	BPI: 8× Platinum; RIAA: Gold
Familiar to Millions	Released: 13 November 2000 (UK); Label: Big Brother; Formats: VHS, DVD	2	—	—	10	BPI: 2× Platinum
Definitely Maybe	Released: 6 September 2004 (UK); Label: Big Brother; Formats: DVD	1	10	17	27	BPI: 3× Platinum; ARIA: Gold
Lord Don't Slow Me Down	Released: 29 October 2007 (UK); Label: Big Brother; Formats: Blu-ray, DVD	1	12	15	18	BPI: Platinum
Time Flies... 1994–2009	Released: 14 June 2010 (UK); Label: Big Brother; Formats: DVD	—	22	—	—	
Oasis: Supersonic	Released: 31 October 2016 (UK); Label: Entertainment One; Formats: Blu-ray, DVD	1	—	—	—	BPI: 4× Platinum
"—" denotes a recording that did not chart or was not released in that territory.

== EPs ==
List of EPs, with selected chart positions
Title	Details	Peak chart positions			
Title	Details	DEN	IRL	ITA	JPN
The Sunday Times	Released: 2002 (UK); Label: Big Brother; Formats: CD	—	—	—	—
Stop the Clocks EP	Released: 13 November 2006 (UK); Label: Big Brother; Formats: CD, digital download	12	17	4	61
Boy with the Blues EP	Released: 6 July 2009; Label: Big Brother; Formats: digital download	–	–	–	–
iTunes Festival: London 2009	Released: 31 July 2009; Label: Big Brother; Formats: digital download	—	—	—	—
"—" denotes a recording that did not chart or was not released in that territory.

== Box sets ==
List of compilation albums, with selected chart positions and certifications
Title	Album details	Peak chart positions		Certifications
Title	Album details	UK	GER	Certifications
Definitely Maybe: Singles (Box Set)	Released: 4 November 1996; Label: Creation; Formats: CD box set	23	—	
(What's the Story) Morning Glory?: Singles (Box Set)	Released: 4 November 1996; Label: Creation; Formats: CD box set	24	—	BPI: Silver
Complete Studio Album Collection	Released: 22 August 2025; Label: Big Brother; Formats: CD, LP	39	13	
"—" denotes a recording that did not chart or was not released in that territory.

== Singles ==
List of singles as lead artist, with selected chart positions and certifications, showing year released and album name
Title	Year	Peak chart positions										Certifications	Album
Title	Year	UK	AUS	CAN	GER	IRL	JPN	NLD	SWE	SWI	US	Certifications	Album
"Supersonic"	1994	31	122	—	—	24	81	—	—	—	— (Note: "Supersonic" did not enter the Billboard Hot 100, but peaked at number 18 on the Hot Singles Sales chart.)	BPI: 3× Platinum; ARIA: Gold	Definitely Maybe
"Shakermaker"	1994	11	—	—	—	—	—	—	—	—	—	BPI: Gold	Definitely Maybe
"Live Forever"	1994	8	114	70	—	3	— (Note: "Live Forever" did not enter the Billboard Japan Hot 100 chart, but peaked at number 18 on the Billboard Japan Hot Overseas chart in 2024.)	— (Note: "Live Forever" did not enter the Netherlands' Single Top 100 but peaked on the Netherlands' Single Tip Chart at number eight.)	— (Note: "Live Forever" did not enter the Swedish Singellista Chart, but peaked at number eight on the Swedish Heatseeker Chart in 2024.)	—	— (Note: "Live Forever" was deemed ineligible to chart on the Billboard Hot 100 due to its lack of an American physical single release, but peaked at number 39 on the Hot 100 Airplay chart.)	BPI: 4× Platinum; ARIA: Platinum	Definitely Maybe
"Cigarettes & Alcohol"	1994	7	—	—	—	15	—	—	—	—	—	BPI: 2× Platinum	Definitely Maybe
"Whatever"	1994	3	40	—	73	5	71	48	10	24	—	BPI: 2× Platinum; RIAJ: Gold	Non-album single
"Some Might Say"	1995	1	109	—	—	3	43	— (Note: "Some Might Say" did not enter the Netherlands' Single Top 100 but peaked on the Netherlands' Single Tip Chart at number 10.)	7	—	— (Note: "Some Might Say" did not enter the Billboard Hot 100, but peaked at number one on the Hot Singles Sales chart.)	BPI: 2× Platinum	(What's the Story) Morning Glory?
"Roll with It"	1995	2	48	—	—	2	97	—	3	—	—	BPI: 2× Platinum	(What's the Story) Morning Glory?
"Morning Glory" (Note: "Morning Glory" was only released as a commercial single in Australia and New Zealand.)	1995	— (Note: "Morning Glory" was not released as a single in the UK, but it charted at number 147 on the UK Singles Chart because of import sales.)	25	—	—	—	— (Note: "Morning Glory" did not enter the Billboard Japan Hot 100 chart, but peaked at number 16 on the Billboard Japan Hot Overseas chart in 2025.)	—	—	—	—	BPI: Platinum; ARIA: Gold	(What's the Story) Morning Glory?
"Wonderwall"	1995	2	1	5	17	2	— (Note: "Wonderwall" did not enter the Billboard Japan Hot 100 chart, but peaked at number 16 on the Billboard Japan Hot Overseas chart in 2024.)	8	12	17	8	BPI: 9× Platinum; ARIA: 14× Platinum; BVMI: 2× Platinum; RIAA: Gold	(What's the Story) Morning Glory?
"Don't Look Back in Anger"	1996	1	19	24	57	1	29	30	2	27	55	BPI: 7× Platinum; ARIA: 5× Platinum; RIAJ: Platinum	(What's the Story) Morning Glory?
"Champagne Supernova"	1996	— (Note: "Champagne Supernova" was not released as a single in the UK, but later peaked at number 79 on the UK Singles Downloads Chart in 2017.)	26	—	—	—	— (Note: "Champagne Supernova" did not enter the Billboard Japan Hot 100 chart, but peaked at number 18 on the Billboard Japan Hot Overseas chart in 2025.)	—	—	—	—	BPI: 4× Platinum; ARIA: 2× Platinum; RIAA: Gold	(What's the Story) Morning Glory?
"D'You Know What I Mean?"	1997	1	16	28	27	1	28	31	2	20	— (Note: "D'You Know What I Mean?" was deemed ineligible to chart on the Billboard Hot 100 due to its lack of an American physical single release, but peaked at number 49 on the Hot 100 Airplay chart.)	BPI: Platinum; IFPI SWE: Gold	Be Here Now
"Stand by Me"	1997	2	48	—	60	2	58	50	10	34	—	BPI: 2× Platinum; ARIA: Gold	Be Here Now
"All Around the World"	1998	1	69	20	84	1	53	47	7	—	—	BPI: Platinum	Be Here Now
"Don't Go Away" (Note: "Don't Go Away" was only released as a commercial single in Japan, and as a promotional single in North America.)	1998	—	—	15	—	—	49	—	—	—	—	BPI: Silver	Be Here Now
"Go Let It Out"	2000	1	23	1	31	1	26	36	14	23	—	BPI: Gold	Standing on the Shoulder of Giants
"Who Feels Love?"	2000	4	—	7	94	15	68	57	—	66	—		Standing on the Shoulder of Giants
"Sunday Morning Call"	2000	4	—	8	—	20	84	—	—	—	—	BPI: Silver	Standing on the Shoulder of Giants
"The Hindu Times"	2002	1	22	1	30	2	16	47	13	15	—	BPI: Gold	Heathen Chemistry
"Stop Crying Your Heart Out"	2002	2	48	6	48	6	20	73	23	48	—	BPI: 2× Platinum; ARIA: Gold	Heathen Chemistry
"Little by Little/She Is Love"	2002	2	54	2	65	9	49	—	41	83	—	BPI: Platinum	Heathen Chemistry
"Songbird"	2003	3	—	2	81	10	108	—	44	94	—	BPI: Platinum	Heathen Chemistry
"Lyla"	2005	1	23	4	33	5	12	52	18	26	— (Note: "Lyla" did not enter the Billboard Hot 100, but peaked at number eight on the Bubbling Under Hot 100 Singles chart, which acts as a 25-song extension to the Hot 100.)	BPI: Gold	Don't Believe the Truth
"The Importance of Being Idle"	2005	1	—	—	63	15	98	84	40	57	—	BPI: Platinum	Don't Believe the Truth
"Let There Be Love"	2005	2	—	—	88	14	90	85	—	—	—	BPI: Silver	Don't Believe the Truth
"Lord Don't Slow Me Down"	2007	10	117	—	—	37	—	—	—	—	—		Non-album single
"The Shock of the Lightning"	2008	3	— (Note: "The Shock of the Lightning" peaked at number 24 on the ARIA Physical Singles chart.)	51	48	12	93	47	5	42	93	BPI: Silver	Dig Out Your Soul
"I'm Outta Time"	2008	12	—	—	62	—	100	—	—	— (Note: "I'm Outta Time" did not enter the Swiss Singles chart, but charted at number 23 on the Swiss Airplay chart.)	— (Note: "I'm Outta Time" did not enter the Billboard Hot 100, but peaked at number nine on the Hot Singles Sales chart.)	BPI: Silver	Dig Out Your Soul
"Falling Down"	2009	10	—	45	82	26	41	71	26	—	— (Note: "Falling Down" did not enter the Billboard Hot 100, but peaked at number six on the Hot Singles Sales chart.)		Dig Out Your Soul
"Don't Stop..." (Demo)	2020	80	—	—	—	—	—	—	—	—	—		Non-album single
"—" denotes a recording that did not chart or was not released in that territory.

=== Promotional singles ===
List of promotional singles, with selected chart positions, showing year released and album name
Title	Year	Peak chart positions							Certifications	Album
Title	Year	UK	UK Indie	CAN	CAN Alt.	JPN Over.	SCO	US Alt.	Certifications	Album
"Columbia"	1993	111	—	—	—	—	78	—	BPI: Gold	Definitely Maybe
"Rock 'n' Roll Star"	1994	— (Note: "Rock 'n' Roll Star" did not enter the UK singles chart, but peaked at number 61 on the UK Singles Sales Chart.)	—	—	—	15	—	36	BPI: Platinum	Definitely Maybe
"Slide Away"	1994	31	—	—	—	17	—	—	BPI: Platinum	Definitely Maybe
"Sad Song"	1994	— (Note: "Sad Song" did not enter the UK singles chart, but peaked at number 31 on the UK Singles Downloads Chart.)	—	—	—	—	—	—		Definitely Maybe
"I Am the Walrus" (Live)	1994	—	—	—	—	—	—	—		"Cigarettes & Alcohol" single
"Round Are Way"	1995	—	—	—	—	—	—	—		"Wonderwall" single
"Cum on Feel the Noize"	1995	—	—	—	—	—	—	—		"Don't Look Back in Anger" single
"Hello"	1996	— (Note: "Hello" did not enter the UK singles chart, but peaked at number 50 on the UK Singles Sales Chart.)	—	—	—	11	—	—	BPI: Gold	(What's the Story) Morning Glory?
"I Hope, I Think, I Know"	1997	—	—	—	—	—	—	—		Be Here Now
"Be Here Now" (Live)	1997	—	—	—	—	—	—	—		Non-album single
"Acquiesce"	1998	17 (Note: "Acquiesce" entered the UK singles chart in 2025.)	—	44	20	—	—	24	BPI: Platinum	The Masterplan
"The Masterplan"	1998	— (Note: "The Masterplan" did not enter the UK singles chart, but peaked at number 39 on the UK Singles Downloads Chart.)	—	—	—	—	—	—	BPI: Platinum	The Masterplan
"Where Did It All Go Wrong?"	2000	—	—	—	—	—	—	—		Standing on the Shoulder of Giants
"Gas Panic!" (Live)	2000	—	—	—	—	—	—	—		Familiar to Millions
"Hey Hey, My My" (Live)	2000	—	—	—	—	—	—	—		Familiar to Millions
"The Meaning of Soul"	2005	—	—	—	—	—	—	—		Don't Believe the Truth
"Turn Up the Sun"	2005	—	—	—	—	—	—	—		Don't Believe the Truth
"Mucky Fingers"	2005	—	—	—	—	—	—	—		Don't Believe the Truth
"Boy with the Blues"	2009	120	10	—	—	—	—	—		Dig Out Your Soul bonus tracks
"I Believe in All"	2009	157	15	—	—	—	—	—		Dig Out Your Soul bonus tracks
"—" denotes a recording that did not chart or was not released in that territory.

== Other charted and certified songs ==
List of songs, with selected chart positions, showing year released and album name
Title	Year	Peak chart positions				Certifications	Album
Title	Year	UK	IRL	JPN Over.	SCO	Certifications	Album
"Digsy's Dinner"	1994	—	—	—	—	BPI: Silver	Definitely Maybe
"Married with Children"	1994	— (Note: "Married with Children" did not enter the UK singles chart, but peaked at number 71 on the UK Streaming Chart.)	—	—	—	BPI: Gold	Definitely Maybe
"Fade Away"	1994	— (Note: "Fade Away" did not enter the UK singles chart, but peaked at number 98 on the UK Singles Downloads Chart.)	—	—	—	BPI: Silver	"Cigarettes & Alcohol" single
"Half the World Away"	1994	56	85	—	22	BPI: 2× Platinum	"Whatever" single
"She's Electric"	1995	— (Note: "She's Electric" did not enter the UK singles chart, but peaked at number 87 on the UK Singles Sales Chart.)	—	—	—	BPI: 2× Platinum; ARIA: Gold	(What's the Story) Morning Glory?
"Cast No Shadow"	1995	—	—	—	—	BPI: Gold	(What's the Story) Morning Glory?
"Hey Now!"	1995	—	—	—	—	BPI: Silver	(What's the Story) Morning Glory?
"Wibbling Rivalry" (as Oas*s)	1995	52	—	—	—		Non-album song
"Talk Tonight"	1995	— (Note: "Talk Tonight" did not enter the UK singles chart, but peaked at number 87 on the UK Singles Sales Chart.)	—	—	—	BPI: Gold	"Some Might Say" single
"Rockin' Chair"	1995	—	—	—	—	BPI: Silver	"Roll With It" single
"Fuckin' in the Bushes"	2000	—	—	—	—	BPI: Silver	Standing on the Shoulder of Giants
"Keep the Dream Alive"	2005	—	—	7	—		Don't Believe the Truth
"Those Swollen Hand Blues"	2009	190	—	—	—		"Falling Down" single
"—" denotes a recording that did not chart or was not released in that territory.

== Other appearances ==
List of non-single guest appearances, showing year released and album name
Title	Year	Album
"Fade Away" (Oasis and Friends)	1995	The Help Album
"Wonderwall" (acoustic version)	1996	...Later Volume One: Brit Beat
"Live Forever" (demo)	1997	Creation for the Nation
"Supersonic" (live)	1998	MTV 120 Minutes Live
"Rock 'n' Roll Star" (live)	1999	The Glastonbury Broadcasts Vol 1
"Merry Xmas Everybody"	2002	NME In Association With War Child Presents 1 Love
"My Generation" (Live at City of Manchester Stadium July '05)	2005	NME Oasis On The Road World Tour 2005
"Who Put the Weight of the World on my Shoulders?"	2005	Goal!: Music from the Motion Picture
"Morning Glory" (Dave Sardy Mix)	2005	Goal!: Music from the Motion Picture
"Cast No Shadow" (Unkle Beachhead Mix)	2005	Goal!: Music from the Motion Picture
"Songbird" (live)	2006	Radio 1's Live Lounge
"Wonderwall" (live)	2019	BBC Radio 1's Live Lounge: The Collection
"The Importance of Being Idle" (live)	2019	BBC Radio 1's Live Lounge: The Collection

== Music videos ==
List of music videos, showing year released and director
Title	Year	Director(s)
"Supersonic" (version 1)	1994	Mark Szaszy
"Supersonic" (version 2)	1994	Nick Egan
"Shakermaker"	1994	Mark Szaszy
"Live Forever" (version 1)	1994	Carlos Grasso
"Live Forever" (version 2)	1994	Nick Egan
"Cigarettes & Alcohol"	1994	Mark Szaszy
"Rock 'n' Roll Star"	1994	Nigel Dick
"Whatever"	1994	Mark Szaszy
"Some Might Say"	1995	Stuart Fryer
"Roll with It"	1995	Jon Klein
"Morning Glory"	1995	Jake Scott
"Wonderwall"	1995	Nigel Dick
"Don't Look Back in Anger"	1996	Nigel Dick
"Champagne Supernova"	1996	Nigel Dick
"D'You Know What I Mean?"	1997	Dom and Nic
"Stand by Me"	1997	David Mould
"Don't Go Away"	1997	Nigel Dick
"All Around the World"	1998	Jonathan Dayton, Valerie Faris
"Acquiesce" (live)	1998	Jill Furmanovsky
"Go Let It Out"	2000	Nick Egan
"Who Feels Love?"	2000	Nick Egan
"Sunday Morning Call"	2000	Nick Egan
"Where Did It All Go Wrong?"	2000	Nick Egan
"Gas Panic!" (live)	2000	N/A
"The Hindu Times"	2002	W.I.Z.
"Stop Crying Your Heart Out"	2002	W.I.Z.
"Little by Little"	2002	Max & Dania
"She Is Love" (unreleased)	2002	Rachel Thomas, Izzie Klingels
"Little by Little" (live)	2002	N/A
"Songbird"	2003	Dick Carruthers
"Lyla"	2005	Tim Qualtrough
"The Importance of Being Idle"	2005	Dawn Shadforth
"Let There Be Love"	2005	Baillie Walsh
"Acquiesce"	2006	Robert Hales
"The Masterplan"	2006	Ben & Greg
"Lord Don't Slow Me Down"	2007	Baillie Walsh
"The Shock of the Lightning"	2008	Julian House, Julian Gibbs
"I'm Outta Time"	2008	Intro
"Falling Down"	2009	W.I.Z.

== See also ==
- List of songs recorded by Oasis
