= Time Flies... 1994–2009 =

Greatest hits album by Oasis
- Released: 14 June 2010
- Recorded: 19 December 1993–March 2008
- Genres: Britpop; rock
- Length: 133:45
- Label: Big Brother
- Producers: Oasis; Owen Morris; Dave Sardy; Mark Coyle; Dave Batchelor; Mark Stent

Oasis chronology
Dig Out Your Soul (2008)	Time Flies... 1994–2009 (2010)	Knebworth 1996 (2021)

Time Flies... 1994–2009 is a compilation album by English rock band Oasis. Released on 14 June 2010 by Big Brother Recordings, the album contains all 27 UK singles released by the band between 1994 and 2009, including "Whatever" and "Lord Don't Slow Me Down", which had previously never appeared on an Oasis studio album. At the request of Oasis guitarist, vocalist, and songwriter Noel Gallagher, "Sunday Morning Call" was not listed anywhere on the artwork but appears as a hidden track on track 14 of the second disc.

Five different versions of the album were released, the two-disc CD version, DVD, the deluxe box set, five-LP box set and the iTunes deluxe edition. A box set featuring postcards of the sleeves of every UK Oasis single was released concurrently with the album. The album was remastered for Record Store Day in 2025.

In Japan, Time Flies entered the charts at number 2, with first-week sales of 59,348 copies; while in the United Kingdom, it entered the charts at number 1, with first-week sales of 101,297. It was the 900th album ever to top the UK Albums Chart. It has been certified 8× platinum in the UK with sales of over 2.4 million. This makes it the group's third best-selling album in the UK after (What's the Story) Morning Glory? and Definitely Maybe.

== Critical reception ==
Professional ratings
Aggregate scores
Source	Rating
Metacritic	76/100
Review scores
Source	Rating
AllMusic	4.5/5 stars
MusicOMH	4/5 stars
NME	8/10
NOW	4/5 stars
Mojo	3/5 stars
Pitchfork	6.0/10
PopMatters	8/10
Q	4/5 stars
The Telegraph	4/5 stars
Uncut	8/10

Time Flies... 1994–2009 received generally positive reviews from music critics upon its release. At Metacritic, which assigns a normalised score out of 100 to ratings from publications, the album received a mean score of 76 based on 11 reviews, indicating "generally favourable reviews".

== Track listing ==
All tracks are written by Noel Gallagher, except "Songbird" and “I’m Outta Time” by Liam Gallagher.

Disc one
No.	Title	Original album	Length
1.	"Supersonic"	Definitely Maybe (1994)	4:44
2.	"Roll with It"	(What's the Story) Morning Glory? (1995)	3:59
3.	"Live Forever"	Definitely Maybe	4:36
4.	"Wonderwall"	(What's the Story) Morning Glory?	4:20
5.	"Stop Crying Your Heart Out"	Heathen Chemistry (2002)	5:03
6.	"Cigarettes & Alcohol"	Definitely Maybe	4:51
7.	"Songbird"	Heathen Chemistry	2:09
8.	"Don't Look Back in Anger"	(What's the Story) Morning Glory?	4:50
9.	"The Hindu Times"	Heathen Chemistry	3:53
10.	"Stand by Me"	Be Here Now (1997)	5:59
11.	"Lord Don't Slow Me Down"	Non-album single (2007)	3:20
12.	"Shakermaker"	Definitely Maybe	5:10
13.	"All Around the World"	Be Here Now	9:41
Total length:			62:35

Disc two
No.	Title	Original album	Length
1.	"Some Might Say"	(What's the Story) Morning Glory?	5:28
2.	"The Importance of Being Idle"	Don't Believe the Truth (2005)	3:42
3.	"D'You Know What I Mean?"	Be Here Now	7:44
4.	"Lyla"	Don't Believe the Truth	5:12
5.	"Let There Be Love"	Don't Believe the Truth	5:26
6.	"Go Let It Out"	Standing on the Shoulder of Giants (2000)	4:38
7.	"Who Feels Love?"	Standing on the Shoulder of Giants	5:44
8.	"Little by Little"	Heathen Chemistry	4:53
9.	"The Shock of the Lightning"	Dig Out Your Soul (2008)	5:04
10.	"She Is Love"	Heathen Chemistry	3:13
11.	"Whatever"	Non-album single (1994)	6:20
12.	"I'm Outta Time"	Dig Out Your Soul	4:09
13.	"Falling Down"	Dig Out Your Soul	4:25
14.	"Sunday Morning Call" (hidden track beginning 2 minutes after "Falling Down")	Standing on the Shoulder of Giants	5:14
Total length:			71:13

Disc two: Japan release version
No.	Title	Original album	Length
14.	"Don't Go Away" (Including aforementioned hidden track)	Be Here Now	12:03

Disc two: United States release version
No.	Title	Original album	Length
1.	"Champagne Supernova"	(What's the Story) Morning Glory?	7:32

- "Champagne Supernova" is listed first track on Disc 2 of United States and Canada version. The United States and Canada version does not contain "Sunday Morning Call" as a hidden track due to time limitations.

=== Disc 3: DVD ===
The DVD includes all the music videos from "Supersonic" to "Falling Down", and in addition, previous unreleased live video versions of "Gas Panic!" and "Little by Little". Also included is commentary on the music videos by both Noel and Liam Gallagher.

Two iTunes Live Festival videos of "Half the World Away" and "Slide Away" are only available with the iTunes Deluxe Edition.

=== Disc 4: iTunes Live: London Festival ===
All tracks are written by Noel Gallagher, except "I Am the Walrus" by Lennon–McCartney and "Songbird" and "I’m Outta Time" by Liam Gallagher.

No.	Title	Length
1.	"F*ckin' in the Bushes"	1:44
2.	"Rock 'n' Roll Star"	5:20
3.	"Lyla"	4:58
4.	"The Shock of the Lightning"	5:06
5.	"Cigarettes & Alcohol"	4:08
6.	"Roll with It"	3:45
7.	"Waiting for the Rapture"	3:25
8.	"The Masterplan"	4:53
9.	"Songbird"	2:12
10.	"Slide Away"	6:05
11.	"Morning Glory"	4:39
12.	"My Big Mouth"	4:24
13.	"Half the World Away"	4:01
14.	"I'm Outta Time"	4:21
15.	"Wonderwall"	4:10
16.	"Supersonic"	5:01
17.	"Live Forever"	5:25
18.	"Don't Look Back in Anger"	5:06
19.	"Champagne Supernova"	7:20
20.	"I Am the Walrus"	8:32
Total length:		94:35

Notes

- All tracks recorded live at the iTunes Festival in the London Roundhouse in Chalk Farm, Camden Town, London, England on 21 July 2009.
- Tracks 1, 7, 12 and 20 are only available with the iTunes Deluxe Edition.
- Tracks 5, 8, 10, 16 and 17 were previously released as part of the iTunes Live: London Festival '09 EP.

== Charts ==
=== Weekly charts ===
2010 weekly chart performance for Time Flies... 1994–2009
Chart (2010)	Peak position
Australian Albums (ARIA)	63
Austrian Albums (Ö3 Austria)	22
Belgian Albums (Ultratop Flanders)	11
Belgian Albums (Ultratop Wallonia)	22
Danish Albums (Hitlisten)	18
Dutch Albums (Album Top 100)	44
Finnish Albums (Suomen virallinen lista)	45
German Albums (Offizielle Top 100)	21
Greek Albums (IFPI)	1
Irish Albums (IRMA)	3
Italian Albums (FIMI)	7
Japanese Albums (Oricon)	2
Mexican Albums (Top 100 Mexico)	48
New Zealand Albums (RMNZ)	13
Portuguese Albums (AFP)	15
Scottish Albums (Official Charts)	1
South Korean Albums Chart	3
Spanish Albums (Promusicae)	20
Swedish Albums (Sverigetopplistan)	44
Swiss Albums (Schweizer Hitparade)	19
UK Albums (Official Charts)	1
US Billboard 200	131
US Top Rock Albums (Billboard)	40

2024–2025 weekly chart performance for Time Flies... 1994–2009
Chart (2024–2025)	Peak position
Australian Albums (ARIA)	50
Canadian Albums (Billboard)	49
Irish Albums (Official Charts)	1

=== Year-end charts ===
Year-end chart performance for Time Flies... 1994–2009
Chart (2010)	Position
Japanese Albums (Oricon)	39
UK Albums (OCC)	38
Chart (2011)	Position
UK Albums (OCC)	181
Chart (2012)	Position
UK Albums (OCC)	152
Chart (2013)	Position
UK Albums (OCC)	183
Chart (2015)	Position
UK Albums (OCC)	94
Chart (2016)	Position
UK Albums (OCC)	67
Chart (2017)	Position
UK Albums (OCC)	35
Chart (2018)	Position
UK Albums (OCC)	35
Chart (2019)	Position
UK Albums (OCC)	37
Chart (2020)	Position
Irish Albums (IRMA)	43
UK Albums (OCC)	24
Chart (2021)	Position
Irish Albums (IRMA)	47
UK Albums (OCC)	23
Chart (2022)	Position
UK Albums (OCC)	15
Chart (2023)	Position
UK Albums (OCC)	18
Chart (2024)	Position
UK Albums (OCC)	11
Chart (2025)	Position
UK Albums (OCC)	4

=== Decade-end charts ===
Decade-end chart performance for Time Flies... 1994–2009
Chart (2010–2019)	Position
UK Albums (OCC)	37

== Certifications and sales ==
Certifications and sales for Time Flies... 1994–2009
Region	Certification	Certified units/sales
Australia (ARIA)	Gold	35,000^{‡}
Italy (FIMI)	Platinum	50,000^{‡}
Japan (RIAJ)	Gold	100,000^{^}
New Zealand (RMNZ)	Gold	7,500^{‡}
United Kingdom (BPI)	8× Platinum	2,400,000^{‡}
^{^} Shipments figures based on certification alone.^{‡} Sales+streaming figures based on certification alone.
