= List of Official Albums Streaming Chart number ones of 2024 =

The Official Albums Streaming Chart is a weekly music chart in the United Kingdom which calculates the most popular albums on audio streaming sites.

== Number ones ==
Key
No.	nth album to top the Official Albums Streaming Chart
re	Return of an album to number one

Contents

No.	Artist (Note: The artist, song, date of reaching number one and number of weeks at number one are those given by the OCC.)	Album	Record label (Note: The record labels are those given by the OCC.)	Reached number one (for the week ending)	Weeks at number one	Ref.
re	Michael Bublé	Christmas	Reprise	4 January 2024	1	
re	The Weeknd	The Highlights	Republic/XO	11 January 2024	2	
re	The Weeknd	The Highlights	Republic/XO	18 January 2024	2	
116	21 Savage	American Dream	Columbia	25 January 2024	1	
117	Noah Kahan	Stick Season	Island	1 February 2024	3	
117	Noah Kahan	Stick Season	Island	8 February 2024	3	
117	Noah Kahan	Stick Season	Island	15 February 2024	3	
118	Kanye West and Ty Dolla Sign	Vultures 1	YZY	22 February 2024	1	
re	The Weeknd	The Highlights	Republic/XO	29 February 2024	3	
re	The Weeknd	The Highlights	Republic/XO	7 March 2024	3	
re	The Weeknd	The Highlights	Republic/XO	14 March 2024	3	
119	Ariana Grande	Eternal Sunshine	Republic	21 March 2024	2	
119	Ariana Grande	Eternal Sunshine	Republic	28 March 2024	2	
120	Future and Metro Boomin	We Don't Trust You	Epic/Freebandz	4 April 2024	1	
121	Beyoncé	Cowboy Carter	Parkwood/Columbia	11 April 2024	3	
121	Beyoncé	Cowboy Carter	Parkwood/Columbia	18 April 2024	3	
121	Beyoncé	Cowboy Carter	Parkwood/Columbia	25 April 2024	3	
122	Taylor Swift	The Tortured Poets Department	EMI	2 May 2024	4	
122	Taylor Swift	The Tortured Poets Department	EMI	9 May 2024	4	
122	Taylor Swift	The Tortured Poets Department	EMI	16 May 2024	4	
122	Taylor Swift	The Tortured Poets Department	EMI	23 May 2024	4	
123	Billie Eilish	Hit Me Hard and Soft	Interscope	30 May 2024	3	
123	Billie Eilish	Hit Me Hard and Soft	Interscope	6 June 2024	3	
123	Billie Eilish	Hit Me Hard and Soft	Interscope	13 June 2024	3	
re	Taylor Swift	The Tortured Poets Department	EMI	20 June 2024	5	
re	Taylor Swift	The Tortured Poets Department	EMI	27 June 2024	5	
re	Taylor Swift	The Tortured Poets Department	EMI	4 July 2024	5	
re	Taylor Swift	The Tortured Poets Department	EMI	11 July 2024	5	
re	Taylor Swift	The Tortured Poets Department	EMI	18 July 2024	5	
124	Eminem	The Death of Slim Shady (Coup de Grâce)	Interscope	25 July 2024	3	
124	Eminem	The Death of Slim Shady (Coup de Grâce)	Interscope	1 August 2024	3	
124	Eminem	The Death of Slim Shady (Coup de Grâce)	Interscope	8 August 2024	3	
125	Charli XCX	Brat	Atlantic	15 August 2024	2	
125	Charli XCX	Brat	Atlantic	22 August 2024	2	
126	Post Malone	F-1 Trillion	Republic	29 August 2024	1	
127	Sabrina Carpenter	Short n' Sweet	Island	5 September 2024	1	
128	Oasis	Time Flies... 1994–2009	Big Brother	12 September 2024	1	
re	Sabrina Carpenter	Short n' Sweet	Island	19 September 2024	5	
re	Sabrina Carpenter	Short n' Sweet	Island	26 September 2024	5	
re	Sabrina Carpenter	Short n' Sweet	Island	3 October 2024	5	
re	Sabrina Carpenter	Short n' Sweet	Island	10 October 2024	5	
re	Sabrina Carpenter	Short n' Sweet	Island	17 October 2024	5	
re	Charli XCX	Brat	Atlantic	24 October 2024	1	
re	Sabrina Carpenter	Short n' Sweet	Island	31 October 2024	1	
129	Tyler, the Creator	Chromakopia	Columbia	7 November 2024	1	
re	Sabrina Carpenter	Short n' Sweet	Island	14 November 2024	3	
re	Sabrina Carpenter	Short n' Sweet	Island	21 November 2024	3	
re	Sabrina Carpenter	Short n' Sweet	Island	28 November 2024	3	
130	Kendrick Lamar	GNX	Interscope	5 December 2024	2	
130	Kendrick Lamar	GNX	Interscope	12 December 2024	2	
re	Michael Bublé	Christmas	Reprise	19 December 2024	2	
re	Michael Bublé	Christmas	Reprise	26 December 2024	2	
