= List of Eden of the East episodes =

The cover of the first Blu-ray compilation released by Production I.G.

Eden of the East (東のエデン, Higashi no Eden) is an anime that began airing on April 9, 2009, on Fuji TV. It was created, directed and written by Kenji Kamiyama. The opening theme is "Falling Down" by English rock band Oasis, while the ending theme is "futuristic imagination" by Japanese band School Food Punishment.

== Episodes ==
No.	Title	Directed by	Written by	Original release date
1	"I Picked Up a Prince"; Transliteration: "Ōji-sama o Hirotta yo" (Japanese: 王子様を拾ったよ)	Hiroshi Yamazaki	Chihiro Itō; Kenji Kamiyama	April 9, 2009
Saki Morimi has just graduated from college and is visiting Washington D.C. When she gets into trouble with the police for attempting to throw a coin into the White House fountain, a mysterious Japanese boy helps her out. The boy appears to have no memory and is completely naked, carrying only a gun and a cell phone. He returns home and finds bullets, a homemade gun and fake passports in his apartment. Before leaving he burns the fake passports in a toaster. Juiz, who claims to be his concierge tells him over the phone that his memory was wiped. Later he takes on the identity Akira Takizawa and decides to go back to Japan along with Saki. While waiting for their flight, they watch a news covering a missile attack on Tokyo.
2	"Melancholic Monday"; Transliteration: "Yūutsu na Getsuyōbi" (Japanese: 憂鬱な月曜日)	Toshiyuki Kawano	Kenji Kamiyama; Naohiro Fukushima	April 16, 2009
After they arrive in Tokyo, Akira confesses to Saki that he has no memory before they met in Washington. Saki goes along with Akira to help him track the address mentioned as his residence on his passport. On the phone Juiz tells Akira that it is his responsibility to spend 8.2 billion yen that the phone is charged with. Meanwhile Kondō is tracking Akira by the places Akira is using the phone for payments. Akira walks up to Kondō and starts a conversation with him after he notices that both of them have the same cell phone. Kondō questions him about Seleção, but Akira does not remember anything.
3	"On the Night of the Late Show"; Transliteration: "Reito Shō no Yoru ni" (Japanese: レイトショーの夜に)	Kōdai Kakimoto	Kenji Kamiyama; Dai Satō	April 23, 2009
Akira and Saki arrive at the building whose address is written in Akira's passport. It turns out to be an abandoned shopping mall. After they look around, Saki watches a movie in the mall cinema. Meanwhile Kondō, following Akira and Saki, enters the building too. After he finds him in the projectionist's room, he beats him up and takes Akira's cellphone. Unfortunately Juiz tells him that the cellphone works only with fingerprint authorization and his efforts are in vain. He then gets a call from Akira and after he was told that he's got his badge they decide to meet up in the Kabuki district. There Kondō is stabbed with a knife by his wife because he cheated on her. When Akira arrives, Kondō tells him to track down the other Seleçãos and to be wary of the organization. Aside from Takizawa and Kondō, there are ten other Seleçãos with 10 billion yen to spend each, with the catch that if any of them had their money count drop to zero, they will be killed. Before dying, Kondō believes that Seleção arranged his death by leaking evidence of his affair to his wife.
4	"True Reality, False Reality"; Transliteration: "Riaru na Genjitsu Kyokō no Genjitsu" (Japanese: リアルな現実 虚構の現実)	Kenichi Maejima	Kenji Kamiyama; Shunpei Okada	April 30, 2009
Following Kondō's advice, Akira goes to track down the other Seleçãos. He eventually manages to find Seleção No. 5, Hajime Hiura, who is an influential brain surgeon. Hiura at first suspects Akira to be the Supporter, the Seleção tasked to observe the other Seleçãos and to punish them if they break any of the rules. After being assured Akira is not the Supporter, Hiura tells him about Seleção. It is an organization run by Mr. Outside, an enigmatic individual who chose twelve individuals and gave them ten billion yen each with the condition to use the money to save Japan. If the Seleçãos refuse, run out of money, or act in a manner unbecoming of a "messiah", then they are to be eliminated by the Supporter. Shortly after Akira leaves, Hiura is murdered by the Supporter since he had run out of money.
5	"Now's Not the Time to be Thinking About That"; Transliteration: "Ima, Sonna Koto Kangaeteru Baai Janai no ni" (Japanese: 今、そんなこと考えてる場合じゃないのに)	Tarō Iwasaki	Kenji Kamiyama; Shōtarō Suga	May 7, 2009
As Akira contemplates the power he has as a Seleção, he is confronted by a stranger who had known him before he had erased his memories. It is implied that the stranger was one of the missing NEETs, since he is angry at Akira for ditching him and his fellows in Dubai. However, he grudgingly thanks him since his experiences there helped him reintegrate into society. Realizing that he had forgotten about Saki, Akira asks Juiz to locate her. As he does this, Seleçãos No. 1 and No. 11 take notice of Akira's activities. Meanwhile, after returning home, Saki prepares for her prospective job interview, but she is rudely turned down. She finds Akira waiting for her outside the building and goes with him, venting about how the adults do not care for the younger generation. Akira then kisses Saki and assures her that he will help her. Meanwhile, a heartbroken Ohsugi, who saw Saki leaving with Akira, goes to a restaurant and drowns his sorrow in alcohol. As the drunken Ohsugi leaves the restaurant, Seleção No. 11 comes across him.
6	"Eden of the East"; Transliteration: "Higashi no Eden" (Japanese: 東のエデン)	Hisashi Ishii	Kenji Kamiyama; Carlos Kasuga	May 14, 2009
Saki returns to her friends in Eden of the East, a recycling club at their university, and tells them about Akira. They soon become interested in but suspicious of him, and decide to go visit. Akira warmly greets them and informs them that he had found out about their club's special commodity. They have developed a revolutionary image recognition program, but have stalled due to problems with the university. Akira offers to help the club with their goal, in exchange for having them help him on his duty as a Seleção. Encouraged by Akira, Saki decides to stay in the club. Meanwhile, Hirasawa receives a call from Kasuga, who had been tasked with finding Ohsugi. Kasuga suspects that Osugi may have been kidnapped by the "Johnny Hunter", a serial killer reputed to have almost 20,000 victims, according to a story circulating over the internet.
7	"Black Swan Dances"; Transliteration: "Burakku Suwan Mau" (Japanese: ブラックスワン舞う)	Toshiyuki Kawano	Kenji Kamiyama; Naohiro Fukushima	May 21, 2009
The Eden of the East members begin to receive pictures from Ohsugi. Takizawa uses his phone to find him. Juiz is able to locate him in the Hotel Insomnia where he was taken after being kidnapped by the "Johnny Hunter". The hunter turns out to be Kuroha Diana Shiratori, Seleção No. 11. Juiz helps the two counter each other's attempts to stop one another from reaching the hotel, but they both meet in the hotel room. Kuroha explains that she cuts off men's "Johnnies" and murders them as an act of revenge. Takizawa confronts Kuroha and offers to show her the love that she had not received from any man. However, he passes out from wounds he gained trying to reach the hotel. Saki follows Takizawa to the hotel to find Kuroha tending to his wounds. Kuroha reveals that her prisoner is not Ohsugi, but is in fact a wanted rapist, and muses how she could have possibly mistaken one for the other. Then using an elaborate illusion, she escapes.
8	"Search for a Fore-Lost Journey"; Transliteration: "Arakajime Ushinawareta Michinori o Sagashite" (Japanese: あらかじめ失われた道程をさがして)	Mitsutaka Noshitani	Kenji Kamiyama; Dai Satō	May 28, 2009
Takizawa wakes up to find Saki tending to his wounds, and learns that Kuroha has disappeared. Osugi returns to the Eden of the East club; he tells them that he was invited to a drinking party and had his bag stolen that night, which caused the misunderstanding. He shows his displeasure about them associating with Takizawa and leaves. He sees Takizawa with Saki and tries to find his true identity. Takizawa asks Eden if they could repair his Seleção phone (which belonged to Kondō). Hirasawa suggests he go visit "Pantsu", a computer prodigy, and sends Saki and Micchon with him to keep an eye on him. While Saki and Micchon go to the convenience store, Takizawa talks to "Pantsu" about Seleção and gets the recluse "Pantsu" to let him in. Meanwhile, Osugi checks on Takizawa's picture that he posted, but the respondents identify Takizawa by all sorts of names. Concluding that Takizawa must be some kind of criminal, he calls Hirasawa in a panic to warn Eden.
9	"The Man Who Lived Too Little"; Transliteration: "Hakanasugita Otoko" (Japanese: ハカナ過ギタ男)	Kōdai Kakimoto	Kenji Kamiyama; Shunpei Okada	June 4, 2009
"Pantsu" manages to recover the complete Seleção transaction history from Kondō's phone, and discovers that the Seleçãos were indeed responsible for Careless Monday, as well as a series of mysterious evacuations in the targeted areas beforehand that ensured there were no casualties. Takizawa was also apparently responsible for the 20,000 missing NEETs. Takizawa makes "Pantsu" promise not to tell Saki or Micchon about what they discovered, and leaves the phone with him in hopes of fully repairing it. Before they leave, Saki asks "Pantsu" about the phone, but he warns her that she is better off not knowing. Meanwhile, Mononobe (Seleção No. 1) and Yuuki (Seleção No. 10) follow Takizawa to Kyoto, curious about his intentions. "Pantsu" discovers that Seleção No. 10 was responsible for the missile attacks, and that it was Takizawa who arranged the evacuations, making him a hero. He then discovers something shocking and rushes outside to warn Takizawa only to be run down by Mononobe, who destroys Kondō's phone before calling Takizawa. Back in Tokyo, Team Eden meets Ohsugi at Takizawa's theater, where they discover the area where the 20,000 NEETs were held and writing on the wall declaring, "I will destroy you, Takizawa Akira!"
10	"Who Killed Takizawa Akira?"; Transliteration: "Darega Takizawa Akira o Koroshita ka" (Japanese: 誰が滝沢朗を殺したか)	Tarō Iwasaki	Kenji Kamiyama; Shōtarō Suga	June 11, 2009
Saki and Micchon board the train to go home but Takizawa doesn't. Takizawa is confronted by Mononobe who offers to reveal the truth about the game and himself. Takizawa then receives a call from Saki who reveals that she overheard him when he confronted Kuroha. Takizawa tells Saki to stay on the line and listen to his and Mononobe's conversation. Meanwhile, Eden investigates the theater and receive a large amount of data from Itazu. Takizawa and Mononobe talk about the missing NEETs and Mononobe tells him who he believes Mr. Outside is: a man named Ato Saizo who is the president of the ATO company. Ato Saizo was a great political figure who helped fix Japan but probably died of terminal cancer, though the game still goes on because of the Supporter. Mononobe tells Takizawa that he will become Mr. Outside and take Juiz. Takizawa and Mononobe arrive at a research facility managed by the ATO Institute. Meanwhile, Eden uncovers the data and it shows the Seleçãos' spending logs. Eden then looks outside to see a ship full of naked people who they think are the missing NEETs, and flees. Mononobe, along with Yuuki and Tsuji (Seleção No. 2), plan to launch more missiles and tell Takizawa not to get in their way again as they tell him why he erased his memories. Takizawa was in despair after he had been betrayed by the people he attempted to help, and he leaves. A woman then comes in telling the three Seleçãos that there will not be a winner tonight. Mononobe checks his phone to see that Juiz has been moved to a hidden location, and Mononobe says that Seleção No. 12 is the Supporter or maybe even Mr. Outside. The final scene shows Takizawa sitting on a moving train and Saki was still feeling very upset on the floor, after realizing that she had betrayed Takizawa by hoping something bigger than Careless Monday would happen.
11	"The East That Goes On"; Transliteration: "Sara ni Tsuzuku Higashi" (Japanese: さらにつづく東)	Toshiyuki Kawano; Masayuki Yoshihara	Kenji Kamiyama; Carlos Kasuga	June 18, 2009
Saki and Micchon return to the multiplex, which has been invaded by the 20,000 NEETs. Saki explains to Eden that Takizawa recruited the NEETs to help evacuate citizens before Careless Monday, disguised as government personnel. However, in order to cover his involvement, Takizawa took responsibility for Careless Monday and shipped the NEETs to Dubai for three months to keep them out of the public eye. Out of guilt and despair for what had happened, Takizawa erased his memories. After analyzing the data, Eden discovers that the missiles are targeted all over Japan, including the multiplex. Takizawa then contacts all of the NEETs and tells them he has arranged a bigger missile attack, and instructs them to figure out the best way to intercept the missiles and upload it to Eden. Using the NEETs' collective knowledge, Juiz organizes a network of F-15 jet fighters and Patriot missile launchers to intercept the missiles. Everybody, including Itazu and the remaining Seleçãos look on as the missiles are destroyed. Knowing that this event will be much harder to cover up than Careless Monday, Takizawa instructs Juiz to use all of his remaining money to make him "King of Japan". His reasoning is that there are many smart people in Japan, but none of them are willing to bear the responsibility of leadership, so it is up to him to take it. In order to become King, Takizawa uses his phone to brainwash himself and he slips it into Saki's pocket. The episode ends with Saki contemplating what will happen to Japan now that Takizawa is a King.
