= Don't Stop... =

2020 single by Oasis

Single by Oasis
- Released: 30 April 2020
- Recorded: c. 2005
- Genre: Rock
- Length: 4:56
- Label: Big Brother
- Songwriter: Noel Gallagher
- Producer: Noel Gallagher

Oasis singles chronology
"Falling Down" (2009)	"Don't Stop..." (2020)

Audio video
- "Oasis - Don't Stop... (Demo)" on YouTube

"I've had infinite time to kill lately so I thought I'd finally look and find out what was actually on the hundreds of faceless unmarked CDs I've got lying around at home. As fate would have it, I have stumbled across an old demo which I thought had been lost for ever... Hope everyone is staying safe and trying to ride out the lockdown with a minimum of fuss. You're welcome by the way."

— Noel Gallagher, 29 April 2020

"Don't Stop..." is a song by the English rock band Oasis. Released as a single on 30 April 2020, it was the band's first track in over 11 years, following their 2009 single "Falling Down". Written and sung by Noel Gallagher, the song is a lo-fi acoustic demo of an unreleased track believed to have been originally recorded in the mid-2000s. The song's exact date of recording is unknown, but music journalist Alexis Petridis speculates it was intended for either the Don't Believe the Truth or Dig Out Your Soul albums, recorded with Oasis. Noel Gallagher has since recorded a studio version of the song for the deluxe edition of the fourth Noel Gallagher's High Flying Birds album, Council Skies.

== Background ==
Until its release, the song was only known from its presence on a rough soundcheck tape recorded before a performance in Hong Kong "about 15 years ago", as revealed by Gallagher in a tweet on the eve of its release. He explained that he had discovered the song on a seemingly blank CD while rummaging through old material during the COVID-19 lockdown in the United Kingdom. Gallagher believed the song was "lost forever", suggesting that this soundcheck tape was the only existing copy.

A re-recorded version of the song, featuring additional instrumentation, was included in the deluxe edition of Council Skies (2023), the fourth studio album by Gallagher's band, Noel Gallagher's High Flying Birds.

== Release and reception ==
The BBC's Mark Savage described the song as "a laid-back, acoustic ballad ... sharing its DNA with classic Oasis songs" as "Stop Crying Your Heart Out" and "Don't Look Back in Anger". The Guardian also reacted positively to the song, called it "one of Noel Gallagher’s best latter-day efforts".

In response to the announcement, Gallagher's then-former Oasis bandmate and younger brother, Liam, tweeted, "Oi tofu boy if your [sic] gonna release old demos make sure im [sic] singing on it and boneheads [sic] playing guitar on it if not it's not worth a wank as you were LG x". Liam also accused Noel of overdubbing the raw recording in a recording studio, calling it a "PR stunt", although The Independent suggested that Liam had claimed to have been "disappointed" at not featuring on the single. Despite this, he later stated that he thought the song was "not a bad tune".

== Charts ==
Chart performance for "Don't Stop..."
Chart (2020)	Peak position
Scotland Singles (OCC)	10
UK Singles (OCC)	80
