= Complete Studio Album Collection =

Box set by Oasis
- Released: 22 August 2025
- Genres: Britpop; alternative rock; indie rock; psychedelic rock
- Label: Big Brother
- Producer: Various

Oasis chronology
Knebworth 1996 (2021)	Complete Studio Album Collection (2025)

Complete Studio Album Collection is a box set by English rock band Oasis, released on 22 August 2025. Consisting of all of the band's seven studio albums alongside the 1998 B-sides compilation The Masterplan, it was announced one week after the band announced the 30th anniversary edition of (What's the Story) Morning Glory?, its release also coinciding with the band's Oasis Live '25 reunion tour.

== Packaging and release ==
Complete Studio Album Collection was announced as a part of the promotion of the Oasis Live '25 Tour. The boxed set consists of all Oasis studio albums from their original timeline alongside The Masterplan. CD versions of the set include each album on singular discs, while on vinyl editions of the set, each album is printed onto two vinyl discs - except for Standing on the Shoulder of Giants, which is on one vinyl disc. Amazon sells golden versions of the CD and vinyl boxed sets.

== Contents ==
Complete Studio Album Collection consists of the following Oasis albums:

1. Definitely Maybe – 1994
2. (What's the Story) Morning Glory? – 1995
3. Be Here Now – 1997
4. The Masterplan – 1998
5. Standing on the Shoulder of Giants – 2000
6. Heathen Chemistry – 2002
7. Don't Believe the Truth – 2005
8. Dig Out Your Soul – 2008

== Charts ==
Chart performance for Complete Studio Album Collection
Chart (2025)	Peak position
Austrian Albums (Ö3 Austria)	50
Belgian Albums (Ultratop Flanders)	106
Belgian Albums (Ultratop Wallonia)	94
German Albums (Offizielle Top 100)	13
German Rock & Metal Albums (Offizielle Top 100)	4
Scottish Albums (Official Charts)	7
UK Albums (Official Charts)	39
