= Council Skies =

Studio album by Noel Gallagher's High Flying Birds
- Released: 2 June 2023
- Recorded: 2021–2022
- Studios: Lone Star (London); Abbey Road (London)
- Genre: Alternative rock
- Length: 42:31
- Label: Sour Mash
- Producers: Noel Gallagher; Paul Stacey

Noel Gallagher's High Flying Birds chronology
| Back the Way We Came: Vol. 1 (2011–2021) (2021) | Council Skies (2023) |

Singles from Council Skies
- 1. "Pretty Boy" Released: 31 October 2022; 2. "Easy Now" Released: 17 January 2023; 3. "Dead to the World" Released: 23 March 2023; 4. "Council Skies" Released: 20 April 2023; 5. "Open the Door, See What You Find" Released: 31 May 2023

Council Skies is the fourth studio album by English rock band Noel Gallagher's High Flying Birds. Produced by Noel Gallagher and longtime engineer Paul Stacey, it was released on 2 June 2023, through Gallagher's label Sour Mash Records. It is the first album Gallagher has recorded in his own recording studio: Lone Star Studios with string sessions taking place at Abbey Road Studios in April 2022. Five singles were released from the album: "Pretty Boy", "Easy Now", "Dead to the World", "Open the Door, See What You Find" and the title track "Council Skies".

== Background ==
Gallagher began demoing the album in late 2021 with sessions commencing at Lone Star Studios in January 2022. Johnny Marr features on three tracks on the album, including lead single: "Pretty Boy".

Gallagher has described the album as "going back to the beginning. Daydreaming, looking up at the sky and wondering about what life could be...". When discussing the album title, Gallagher said "The title comes from a book by the artist Pete McKee. I was writing the song which was to become Council Skies, but it wasn't called Council Skies. There's a bit in the song when I was writing it, where a phrase was missing - I didn't know what that phrase was gonna be." He went on to say: "Pete's book happened to be on my coffee table at home. So I called him up and said, Can I use this title? And he said yeah. And I rewrote the song and then subsequently a lot of other things started to fall into place.".

== Artwork and cover ==
The artwork is taken by Kevin Cummins and features the band's live equipment set up on the original centre spot of where Manchester City's Maine Road football stadium once stood.

== Singles ==
On 31 October 2022, the song "Pretty Boy" was released as the first single. On 17 January 2023, "Easy Now" was released as the album's second single. On 23 March 2023, "Dead to the World" was released as the album's third single. On 20 April 2023, "Council Skies" was released as the album's fourth single. On 31 May 2023, "Open the Door, See What You Find" was released as the album's fifth single.

== Critical reception ==
Professional ratings
Aggregate scores
| Source | Rating |
|---|---|
| AnyDecentMusic? | 7.6/10 |
| Metacritic | 81/100 |
Review scores
| Source | Rating |
| AllMusic | 4.5/5 stars |
| American Songwriter | 4/5 stars |
| Clash | 8/10 |
| Classic Rock | 8/10 |
| The Independent | 4/5 stars |
| Mojo | 4/5 stars |
| NME | 4/5 stars |
| Record Collector | 4/5 stars |
| Rolling Stone UK | 4/5 stars |
| Uncut | 8/10 |

Council Skies received critical acclaim from music critics. At Metacritic, which assigns a normalised rating out of 100 to reviews from publications, the album received an average score of 81 based on 11 reviews, indicating "universal acclaim".

Emma Harrison of Clash wrote of Council Skies that it was "Surefooted, revelatory, well-rounded and emotionally deep, 'Council Skies' cements his reputation as one of the best songwriters the UK has ever produced. This collection of songs is one of his finest post-Oasis offerings, and it feels like the album that Noel and his High Flying Birds have been aching to make".

== Track listing ==
All tracks are written by Noel Gallagher, except track 13 of the bonus CD, written Bob Dylan

Council Skies track listing
| No. | Title | Length |
|---|---|---|
| 1. | "I'm Not Giving Up Tonight" | 4:06 |
| 2. | "Pretty Boy" | 4:48 |
| 3. | "Dead to the World" | 4:09 |
| 4. | "Open the Door, See What You Find" | 3:59 |
| 5. | "Trying to Find a World That's Been and Gone: Part 1" | 2:57 |
| 6. | "Easy Now" | 3:52 |
| 7. | "Council Skies" | 4:39 |
| 8. | "There She Blows!" | 3:56 |
| 9. | "Love Is a Rich Man" | 4:21 |
| 10. | "Think of a Number" | 5:41 |
| Total length: | | 43:00 |

Limited edition CD bonus track
| No. | Title | Length |
|---|---|---|
| 11. | "We're Gonna Get There In the End" | 4:13 |
| Total length: | | 47:13 |

Japanese CD bonus track
| No. | Title | Length |
|---|---|---|
| 11. | "Easy Now" (Acoustic) | 3:36 |
| Total length: | | 46:36 |

Bonus 7" on the limited LP edition
| No. | Title | Length |
|---|---|---|
| 1. | "We're Gonna Get There In the End" | 4:13 |
| 2. | "Pretty Boy" (Acoustic) | 4:47 |

Deluxe edition bonus CD
| No. | Title | Length |
|---|---|---|
| 1. | "Don't Stop..." | 4:45 |
| 2. | "We're Gonna Get There In the End" | 4:13 |
| 3. | "Mind Games" | 4:32 |
| 4. | "Pretty Boy" (Instrumental) | 4:50 |
| 5. | "Dead to the World" (Instrumental) | 4:13 |
| 6. | "Council Skies" (Instrumental) | 4:42 |
| 7. | "Think of a Number" (Instrumental) | 5:46 |
| 8. | "I'm Not Giving Up Tonight" (David Holmes Remix) | 5:42 |
| 9. | "Think of a Number" (Pet Shop Boys Magic Eye 12" Remix) | 5:12 |
| 10. | "Pretty Boy" (Robert Smith Remix) | 5:43 |
| 11. | "Council Skies" (The Reflex Revision) | 5:25 |
| 12. | "Flying on the Ground" (Radio 2 Session, 08/09/21) | 3:14 |
| 13. | "You Ain't Goin' Nowhere" (Radio 2 Session, 08/09/21) | 2:17 |
| 14. | "Live Forever" (Radio 2 Session, 08/09/21) | 4:49 |
| Total length: | | 108:00 |

== Personnel ==
Noel Gallagher's High Flying Birds

- Noel Gallagher – vocals, backing vocals, acoustic guitar (all tracks), electric guitar (tracks 1-2, 4, 6-13), bass guitar (tracks 2, 5, 10-11), baritone guitar (tracks 9, 11, 13), piano (tracks 3, 12) Mellotron (tracks 1-4, 9, 12), percussion (tracks 22-24)
- Gem Archer – acoustic guitar (tracks 1), electric guitar (tracks 1, 12), baritone guitar (tracks 1, 12), mouth organ (track 23)
- Russ Pritchard – bass guitar (tracks 1, 3-4, 7-8, 12, 22-23)
- Chris Sharrock – drums (tracks 1, 4, 8, 10, 12-13)
- Mikey Rowe - keyboards (tracks 1-4, 6-12, 22-24)

Additional musicians

- Jess Greenfield - backing vocals (tracks 1-5, 7-11)
- Charlotte Marionneau - percussion (tracks 1, 4, 8)
- Johnny Marr – electric guitar (tracks 2, 4, 7)
- Paul Stacey – electric guitar (tracks 1, 4, 6, 8-9, 11, 13), baritone guitar (tracks 1, 9), Mellotron (tracks 1, 8), piano (track 4), bass guitar (tracks 6, 8, 9, 11, 13)
- Jeremy Stacey – drums (tracks 2, 6-7, 9, 11), percussion (tracks 6-7)
- Callum Marinho – the tube (tracks 1, 3-4, 8, 11, 24), keyboards (tracks 2-3, 5, 6, 9, 13), drum machines (track 2), glockenspiel (track 3), Mellotron (tracks 5, 8, 9), percussion (track 7), piano (track 12)
- Clement St. Leonard – percussion (tracks 1–13), the funk box (track 2), tubular bells (tracks 3, 4), sound effects (tracks 5, 6, 8-9,11), keyboards (track 6)
- Alistair White – trombone (tracks 1, 9)
- Graeme Blevins – saxophone (tracks 1, 7)
- Steve Hamilton – saxophone (tracks 1, 7, 12)
- Tom Walsh – trumpet (tracks 1, 7, 9)
- Joe Auckland – trumpet (tracks 1, 7)
- Ben Edwards – trumpet (track 12)
- Mark Frost – bass trombone (tracks 1, 7, 9)
- Geraint Watkins – accordion (track 3)
- Phillip Woods, Ruth O'Reilly, Franciso Gomez, Derryck Nasib – French horn (track 5)
- Daniel Higham, Thomas Dunnett, Pete North – trombone (track 5)
- Jody Linscott, Peter Eckford, Gary Hammond – percussion (track 7)
- The Wired Strings – strings (tracks 1, 3-5, 7, 11)
- Emre Ramazanoglu – drums (track 18)
- Keefus Ciancia – keyboards (track 18)
- Jason Falkner – bass guitar (track 18)
- Pet Shop Boys – additional vocals (track 19)
- Robert Smith – guitar and piano (track 20)
- Jason Cooper – drums (track 20)
- Johnny Copland – live bass (track 21)

Backing vocalists

- Roxys (Piney Gir, Amy Ashworth, Emma Brammer)
- Louise Clare Marshall
- Andrea Grant
- Lucita Jules

Production

- Noel Gallagher, Paul 'Strangeboy' Stacey – production
- Callum Marinho – mixing and engineering
- Beau Blaise – additional engineering
- Matt Colton – mastering
- Rosie Danvers, assisted by Tommy Danvers – string arrangements
- Alistair White – brass arrangements

Design

- Noel Gallagher – artwork design and concept
- Matthew Cooper – layout
- Kevin Cummins – artwork photography

== Charts ==
=== Weekly charts ===
Weekly chart performance for Council Skies
| Chart (2023) | Peak position |
|---|---|
| Australian Albums (ARIA) | 72 |
| Austrian Albums (Ö3 Austria) | 13 |
| Belgian Albums (Ultratop Flanders) | 12 |
| Belgian Albums (Ultratop Wallonia) | 9 |
| Dutch Albums (Album Top 100) | 24 |
| French Albums (SNEP) | 28 |
| German Albums (Offizielle Top 100) | 8 |
| Irish Albums (Official Charts) | 2 |
| Italian Albums (FIMI) | 18 |
| Japanese Albums (Oricon) | 10 |
| Japanese Combined Albums (Oricon) | 16 |
| Japanese Hot Albums (Billboard Japan) | 13 |
| Japanese Rock Albums (Oricon) | 2 |
| New Zealand Albums (RMNZ) | 39 |
| Scottish Albums (Official Charts) | 2 |
| Spanish Albums (Promusicae) | 33 |
| Swiss Albums (Schweizer Hitparade) | 11 |
| UK Albums (Official Charts) | 2 |
| UK Independent Albums (Official Charts) | 1 |
| US Top Album Sales (Billboard) | 20 |
| US Indie Store Album Sales (Billboard) | 11 |

=== Year-end charts ===
Year-end chart performance for Council Skies
| Chart (2023) | Position |
|---|---|
| UK Albums (OCC) | 94 |

== Certifications ==
| Region | Certification | Certified units/sales |
|---|---|---|
| United Kingdom (BPI) | Gold | 100,000^{‡} |
^{‡} Sales+streaming figures based on certification alone.
