= The Shock of the Lightning =

2008 single by Oasis

Single by Oasis

from the album Dig Out Your Soul
- B-side: "Falling Down" (Chemical Brothers Remix)
- Released: 29 September 2008
- Genre: Alternative rock, psychedelic rock, indie rock
- Length: 4:59 (album version); 4:13 (radio edit)
- Label: Big Brother
- Songwriter: Noel Gallagher
- Producer: Dave Sardy

Oasis singles chronology
"Lord Don't Slow Me Down" (2007)	"The Shock of the Lightning" (2008)	"I'm Outta Time" (2008)

Dig Out Your Soul track listing
- 1. "Bag It Up"; 2. "The Turning"; 3. "Waiting for the Rapture"; 4. "The Shock of the Lightning"; 5. "I'm Outta Time"; 6. "(Get Off Your) High Horse Lady"; 7. "Falling Down"; 8. "To Be Where There Is Life"; 9. "Ain't Got Nothin'"; 10. "The Nature of Reality"; 11. "Soldier On"

Music video
- "The Shock Of The Lightning" on YouTube

"The Shock of the Lightning" is a song by English rock band Oasis. It is the fourth track from the band's seventh studio album, Dig Out Your Soul (2008). The song was released as the first single from the album on 29 September 2008. It received its first airplay on 15 August 2008 on multiple UK and Irish radio stations including the Ian Dempsey Breakfast show on Today FM in Ireland, BBC 6 Music by Shaun Keaveny, and by Chris Moyles on BBC Radio 1. Moyles was joined by Noel Gallagher on 15 August 2008 to make a remix.

== Release ==
Noel said of the song: "If 'The Shock of the Lightning' sounds instant and compelling to you, it's because it was written and recorded dead fast. 'The Shock of the Lightning' basically is the demo. And it has retained its energy. And there's a lot to be said for that, I think. The first time you record something is always the best". When asked about the song's energetic similarities to the older Oasis single "Rock 'n' Roll Star", he revealed the song was "kind of more" inspired by the krautrock bands Can and Neu! and called it their most energetic single in recent years. It was described by NME as "a massively improved version of 'It's Gettin' Better (Man!!)'" and featuring "love is a litany/a magical mystery" as the song's chorus.

The single is the first Oasis song to feature a remix on a studio release. The B-side is a remixed version of the album track "Falling Down" by The Chemical Brothers, with whom Noel has worked in the past. However, a promo release of Oasis' cover of "Cum On Feel the Noize" contained the "Lynchmob Beats Mix" of "Champagne Supernova" by Brandon Lynch that was also re-released as a stand-alone promo for Stop the Clocks. Consequently, this is their first official CD single release that does not contain a new track as a B-side.

== Reception ==
On 30 July 2008, the official Oasis website posted a Dig Out Your Soul trailer which contained a 23-second clip of the intro to "The Shock of the Lightning" as well as a 20-second clip of the drum solo. On 15 August 2008, the song received its first airplay on The Chris Moyles Show on BBC Radio 1 with Noel Gallagher present. Noel said of the song on Shaun Keaveny's Radio 6 show, "It's a driving, pumping, pop, rock 'n' roll masterpiece". In NME, the song was named as 'song of the week' and received a score of 9/10, despite being referred to as "only the fifth best song on Dig Out Your Soul".

"The Shock of the Lightning" entered the UK Singles Chart at number 3, becoming the band's first lead single since their debut, "Supersonic", to fail to reach number 1 in their homeland. It peaked behind Pink's number 1 single "So What" and "Sex on Fire" by Kings of Leon at number 2 during the week of its physical release. It was eventually certified Silver in the UK in 2024, having previously been their sole lead single still awaiting this milestone. The song also reached number 12 on the Billboard Hot Modern Rock chart in the United States, making it their most successful single there since "Don't Go Away", which peaked on the chart at number 5 in 1998. It also reached number 93 on the Billboard Hot 100, their first song to chart on the Hot 100 since "Don't Look Back in Anger" in 1996.

== Music video ==
The music video for the song (directed by Julian House and Julian Gibbs) debuted on the band's official site on 25 August at 17:30 (UK time) and was broadcast on Channel 4 at 23:40. The video depicts Liam singing and the occasional appearance of the rest of the band, intercut with stock footage related to the album's artwork. The opening shot of the video of silhouetted heads is a reference to the cover of the Rolling Stones compilation record Hot Rocks 1964-1971, an idea previously used in the video for Super Furry Animals song "(Drawing) Rings Around the World".

== Accolades ==
The track was number 96 in NME's 100 Tracks of the Decade feature and was the only Oasis song to feature in the list.

== Track listings ==
All songs were written by Noel Gallagher.

CD and 7-inch

1. "The Shock of the Lightning" – 5:02
2. "Falling Down" (Chemical Brothers remix) – 4:32

iTunes and Oasisinet exclusive bundle

1. "The Shock of the Lightning" – 5:02
2. "Falling Down" (Chemical Brothers remix) – 4:32
3. "The Shock of the Lightning" (music video)

Japanese edition

1. "The Shock of the Lightning" – 5:03
2. "The Shock of the Lightning" (The Jagz Kooner remix) – 6:38
3. "Lord Don't Slow Me Down" – 3:18

== Personnel ==
- Liam Gallagher – lead vocals, tambourine
- Noel Gallagher – electric guitar, backing vocals, electronics
- Gem Archer – electric guitar, keyboards
- Andy Bell – bass and electric guitars
- Zak Starkey – drums

== Charts ==
=== Weekly charts ===
Chart (2008)	Peak position
Australia Physical Singles (ARIA)	24
Austria (Ö3 Austria Top 40)	53
Belgium (Ultratop 50 Flanders)	40
Belgium (Ultratip Bubbling Under Wallonia)	15
Canada Hot 100 (Billboard)	51
Canada Rock (Billboard)	2
Europe (Eurochart Hot 100)	7
France (SNEP)	38
Germany (GfK)	48
Ireland (IRMA)	12
Netherlands (Single Top 100)	47
Scottish Singles Sales (Official Charts)	1
Sweden (Sverigetopplistan)	5
Switzerland (Schweizer Hitparade)	42
UK Singles (Official Charts)	3
UK Independent (Official Charts)	1
US Billboard Hot 100	93
US Adult Alternative Airplay (Billboard)	26
US Alternative Airplay (Billboard)	12

=== Year-end charts ===
Chart (2008)	Position
UK Singles (OCC)	174

== Certifications ==
Region	Certification	Certified units/sales
United Kingdom (BPI)	Silver	200,000^{‡}
^{‡} Sales+streaming figures based on certification alone.
