= I'm Outta Time =

Single by Oasis

from the album Dig Out Your Soul
- B-side: "To Be Where There's Life"
- Released: 1 December 2008
- Recorded: Abbey Road, London
- Genre: Alternative rock
- Length: 4:10 (album version); 3:49 (radio edit)
- Label: Big Brother
- Songwriter: Liam Gallagher
- Producer: Dave Sardy

Oasis singles chronology
"The Shock of the Lightning" (2008)	"I'm Outta Time" (2008)	"Falling Down" (2009)

Music video
- "I'm Outta Time" on YouTube

"I'm Outta Time" is a song by English rock band Oasis, featured on their seventh studio album, Dig Out Your Soul (2008). The second single from the album, succeeding "The Shock of the Lightning", "I'm Outta Time" was written by lead vocalist Liam Gallagher and released on 1 December 2008.

== Composition ==
The song features a short speech sample from John Lennon taken from one of his last interviews in 1980. The speech sample says: "As Churchill said, it's every Englishman's inalienable right to live where the hell he likes. I said, what, do you think it's gonna vanish? It's not going to be there when I get back?".

== Reception ==
The song has been noted as one of the highlights of the album by fans, as well as the band themselves, with guitarist Noel Gallagher labelling it "deceptively brilliant". It has also been praised by music critics, with NME calling it a return to form, and comparing it to the music of Oasis-admired rock band The Beatles.

It charted at number 12 in the UK Singles Chart – the first Oasis single to miss the top ten since 1994's "Shakermaker", ending the band's streak of 22 consecutive top tens (not counting "Wibbling Rivalry", which peaked at number 52 between the releases of "Wonderwall" and "Don't Look Back in Anger"). It spent only two weeks in the UK top 75, the least ever by any Oasis single. Although only peaking at number 48 in France, the song spent a total of 28 weeks in the French Singles Chart, the most ever by any Oasis single.

== Music video ==
The music video for "I'm Outta Time" was directed by the production company Intro and was released in November 2008. Filmed in black and white, it shows Liam Gallagher, the only band member to appear in the clip, on a "surreal journey through a moon-lit English landscape". Directed by W.I.Z., it was filmed in Bourton-on-the-Water. At the end of the video, Liam is filmed in a close-up profile shot lying down. This bears resemblance to the back cover artwork for John Lennon's album Imagine. It also resembles the cover of Lennon's 1973 album Mind Games.

== Covers ==
The song was covered by singer Lily Allen on BBC's Live Lounge on 2 December 2009.

== Personnel ==
- Liam Gallagher – vocals, acoustic guitar
- Noel Gallagher – electric and acoustic guitars, electronics, mellotron, keyboards
- Gem Archer – electric and acoustic guitars, piano, keyboards
- Andy Bell – bass
- Zak Starkey – drums
- John Lennon – speech sample

== Track listing ==
CD (RKIDSCD55)
No.	Title	Writer(s)	Length
1.	"I'm Outta Time" (album version)	Liam Gallagher	4:10
2.	"I'm Outta Time" (Twiggy Ramirez remix)	L. Gallagher	6:14
3.	"The Shock of the Lightning" (Jagz Kooner remix)	Noel Gallagher	6:40

7" (RKID55)
No.	Title	Writer(s)	Length
1.	"I'm Outta Time" (album version)	L. Gallagher	4:10
2.	"To Be Where There's Life" (Neon Neon remix)	Gem Archer	4:17

7" (RKID55X)
No.	Title	Writer(s)	Length
1.	"I'm Outta Time" (Twiggy Ramirez remix)	L. Gallagher	6:14
2.	"The Shock of the Lightning" (Jagz Kooner remix)	N. Gallagher	6:40

Digital bundle
No.	Title	Writer(s)	Length
1.	"I'm Outta Time" (album version)	L. Gallagher	4:10
2.	"I'm Outta Time" (Twiggy Ramirez remix)	L. Gallagher	6:14
3.	"I'm Outta Time" (demo)	L. Gallagher	4:01

American iTunes EP
No.	Title	Writer(s)	Length
1.	"I'm Outta Time" (album version)	L. Gallagher	4:10
2.	"I'm Outta Time" (remix)	L. Gallagher	6:14
3.	"I'm Outta Time" (demo)	L. Gallagher	4:01
4.	"The Shock of the Lightning" (Jagz Kooner remix)	N. Gallagher	6:40
5.	"To Be Where There's Life" (Neon Neon remix)	Archer	4:17

In Japan SICP 2163
No.	Title	Writer(s)	Length
1.	"I'm Outta Time" (album version)	L. Gallagher	4:10
2.	"I'm Outta Time" (Twiggy Ramirez remix)	L. Gallagher	6:14
3.	"To Be Where There's Life" (Neon Neon remix)	Archer	4:20
4.	"Waiting for the Rapture" (Alt Version No. 2)	N. Gallagher	2:59
5.	"To Be Where There's Life" (A Richard Fearless Production)	Archer	6:29

== Charts ==
Chart (2008)	Peak position
Austria (Ö3 Austria Top 40)	62
Belgium (Ultratip Bubbling Under Flanders)	6
Belgium (Ultratip Bubbling Under Wallonia)	14
France (SNEP)	48
Germany (GfK)	62
Scotland Singles (OCC)	1
UK Singles (OCC)	12
UK Indie (OCC)	1
US Hot Singles Sales (Billboard)	9
