= Knebworth 1996 =

Live album by Oasis
- Released: 19 November 2021
- Recorded: 10–11 August 1996
- Venue: Knebworth Park, Stevenage, England
- Genre: Britpop
- Length: 99:57
- Label: Big Brother

Oasis chronology
Time Flies... 1994–2009 (2010)	Knebworth 1996 (2021)	Oasis: Complete Studio Album Collection (2025)

Knebworth 1996 is a 2021 live album and documentary film by English rock band Oasis. The film was directed by Jake Scott and released on 23 September 2021, while the album was released on 19 November 2021. Both were recorded on 10–11 August 1996 at the Knebworth Festival at Knebworth Park, England. By the week after its release, the film had become the highest-grossing documentary of 2021 in the UK. The cover art for the album is a Jill Furmanovsky photograph from the 1995 edition of Glastonbury and was used for promotional posters prior to the 1996 festival.

== Release ==
Various tracks from Oasis Knebworth concerts have been previously released on various special and limited releases, with and without the exact concert date specification. "Champagne Supernova" from 11 August was released on …There and Then limited CD. "Cast No Shadow" and "Columbia" from 10 and 11 August respectively were released as iTunes bonus tracks to Stop the Clocks compilation album. "The Masterplan" and "Wonderwall" from 10 August were released on (What's the Story) Morning Glory? 2014 reissue, the latter as a Japanese only bonus track. "My Big Mouth" from 10 August was released on Be Here Now 2016 reissue.

== Track listing ==
All tracks are written by Noel Gallagher, except where noted.

Disc one
No.	Title	Writer(s)	Date	Length
1.	"Columbia"		10 August 1996	4:47
2.	"Acquiesce"		10 August 1996	3:56
3.	"Supersonic"		10 August 1996	5:09
4.	"Hello"	Noel Gallagher; Gary Glitter; Mike Leander	11 August 1996	2:55
5.	"Some Might Say"		11 August 1996	5:04
6.	"Roll with It"		11 August 1996	4:05
7.	"Slide Away"		11 August 1996	5:47
8.	"Morning Glory"		11 August 1996	4:12
9.	"Round Are Way"		10 August 1996	4:47
10.	"Cigarettes & Alcohol"		10 August 1996	4:43

Disc two
No.	Title	Writer(s)	Date	Length
1.	"Whatever"	Noel Gallagher, Neil Innes	10 August 1996	5:59
2.	"Cast No Shadow"		10 August 1996	4:46
3.	"Wonderwall"		10 August 1996	4:04
4.	"The Masterplan"		10 August 1996	4:40
5.	"Don't Look Back in Anger"		11 August 1996	4:55
6.	"My Big Mouth"		10 August 1996	5:10
7.	"It's Gettin' Better (Man!!)"		11 August 1996	5:56
8.	"Live Forever"		10 August 1996	4:56
9.	"Champagne Supernova"		11 August 1996	7:26
10.	"I Am the Walrus"	John Lennon, Paul McCartney	11 August 1996	6:40
Total length:				99:57

== Personnel ==
Oasis

- Liam Gallagher – lead vocals, tambourine
- Noel Gallagher – lead guitar, lead and backing vocals
- Paul "Bonehead" Arthurs – rhythm guitar
- Paul "Guigsy" McGuigan – bass guitar
- Alan "Whitey" White – drums

Additional musicians

- Mark Feltham – harmonica
- Janette Mason – keyboards
- Anne Morfee – 1st violin
- Anna Hemery – 2nd violin
- Katie Heller – viola
- Sue Dence – viola
- Emma Black – cello
- Dave Bishop – saxophone
- Jamie Talbot – saxophone
- Steve Sidwell – trumpet
- Simon Gardner – trumpet
- Stuart Brooks – trumpet
- John Squire – guitar on "Champagne Supernova" and "I Am the Walrus"

== Charts ==
Chart performance for Knebworth 1996
Chart (2021)	Peak position
Australian Albums (ARIA)	87
Austrian Albums (Ö3 Austria)	23
Belgian Albums (Ultratop Flanders)	27
Belgian Albums (Ultratop Wallonia)	32
Dutch Albums (Album Top 100)	30
French Albums (SNEP)	63
German Albums (Offizielle Top 100)	15
Irish Albums (OCC)	7
Italian Albums (FIMI)	30
Japanese Albums (Oricon)	9
Scottish Albums (OCC)	2
Spanish Albums (PROMUSICAE)	31
Swiss Albums (Schweizer Hitparade)	19
UK Albums (OCC)	4
US Top Album Sales (Billboard)	56

== Certifications ==
Certifications for Knebworth 1996
Region	Certification	Certified units/sales
France (SNEP)	Gold	50,000^{‡}
United Kingdom (BPI)	Gold	100,000^{‡}
^{‡} Sales+streaming figures based on certification alone.
