= Boy with the Blues =

Promotional single by Oasis
- Released: 13 July 2009
- Genre: Alternative rock
- Length: 4:41
- Songwriter(s): Liam Gallagher

Audio video
- "Boy with the Blues" on YouTube

"Boy with the Blues" is a song by the English rock band Oasis, written by frontman Liam Gallagher. The song was considered for inclusion on the band's sixth album, Don't Believe the Truth, but missed the final cut. In October 2005, Noel Gallagher announced that the song was set to lead a summer 2006 UK EP release. In an interview with the NME, he said: "I think we’re gonna put out just as a single, that’s not going be on the next album." The sessions for that EP never occurred and the release was cancelled in early 2006.

Noel, in a December 2005 interview for the NME, described the track as being driven by a piano and acoustic guitars. He also mentioned that the track has got a chant at the end, where the words go "'Come all together / If we come all together / We'll come all together for you'." He was quoted as saying "It's a bit like Spiritualized, y'know, when they do that gospel thing. The bulk of the song is only about three minutes long, but the outro could go on forever, really." Noel also said the track did not go on the Don't Believe the Truth album because of a lack of a chorus. He also said that the track needed more work done on it and spoke of planned recording session in January 2006 during a break in their Don't Believe the Truth world tour. However, these sessions didn't take place.

In different interviews conducted in February 2006, Noel and Liam both made conflicting statements as to the future of the track. Liam was quoted as saying, "After the tour we'll do some recording, then we'll put it out," whilst Noel said, "We had a couple of tracks left over from the last record and in our own heads we thought they were good enough to be released as an EP. We went back and listened to the tapes and we reckon we can get it better, so we're having the year off instead."

In the February 2007 NME issue, Noel said: "It could be like a gospel track. It could be nine minutes long because there's a great refrain in the chorus that could go on forever."

The song was finally released with the deluxe version of Oasis' seventh studio album Dig Out Your Soul. This song was also released as a part of Oasis' download-only EP Boy with the Blues on July 6, 2009.

In the United States, it was released on NCIS: The Official TV Soundtrack while a brief snippet of the song itself was heard during the NCIS Season 6 episode, Legend Part 1 which also served as the backdoor pilot for NCIS: Los Angeles.

== Track listing ==
iTunes Single

1. "Boy with the Blues"

Boy with the Blues

1. "Boy with the Blues"
2. "I Believe in All"
3. "(Get Off Your) High Horse Lady" – the 29 May Devendra Banhart Mix

The first two tracks were only available on the Dig Out Your Soul deluxe boxset bonus disc, whilst the third track had only been released as a listen only track on Oasisinet's Radio Supernova.
