= Falling Down (Oasis song) =

Single by Oasis

from the album Dig Out Your Soul
- B-side: "Those Swollen Hand Blues"
- Released: 9 March 2009
- Recorded: 2007
- Studio: Abbey Road, London
- Genre: Alternative rock, psychedelic rock
- Length: 4:20 (album version with extended intro); 4:04 (radio edit); 4:26 (Time Flies... 1994-2009 version)
- Label: Big Brother
- Songwriter: Noel Gallagher
- Producer: Dave Sardy

Oasis singles chronology
"I'm Outta Time" (2008)	"Falling Down" (2009)	"Don't Stop..." (2020)

Music video
- "Oasis - Falling Down (Official Video)" on YouTube

"Falling Down" is a song by English rock band Oasis, from their seventh studio album, Dig Out Your Soul (2008). Written and sung by lead guitarist Noel Gallagher, it was released on 9 March 2009 as the third single from the album with the digital release occurring a day earlier. It was the final single released by the band before their break-up just over five months later in August 2009. It would remain the last new release from the band for more than eleven years until April 2020 with the release of the promotional single "Don't Stop...".

== Reception ==
The song debuted at number 10 in the UK Singles Chart with first-week sales of 21,448, but the song only achieved a chart position of number 37 in the UK download chart in the same week, most likely because it was available as a download release before the new album was released. (Upon the release of Dig Out Your Soul the previous October, "Falling Down" charted briefly at number 125 on download sales alone). "Falling Down" is the sixth Oasis single to be sung by Noel rather than Liam.

It is also the second Oasis song to be used in a TV series (the first being "Half the World Away"). Due to strong download sales of the track, the B-side "Those Swollen Hand Blues" made the UK charts at number 190 on the day "Falling Down" made the top ten.

"Falling Down" posted a subtle improvement from its predecessor, "I'm Outta Time", on the UK Singles Chart, reaching number 10 in its chart entry week. This was something of a return to form for the band, after "I'm Outta Time" charting at number 12 made it the first Oasis single released in the UK to fail to reach the top 10 since "Shakermaker" in 1994. Between the two releases the band had put out 22 singles which made the top 10. However, it still showed a decline in the band's fortunes; from the release of "Whatever" at the end of 1994 until the release of "I'm Outta Time", the band had only had one single which failed to reach the top four in the charts, and that had been 2007's "Lord Don't Slow Me Down", which was only a minor promotional release and a non-album track and also download only.

During the commentary on the Time Flies... 1994–2009 DVD, Gallagher stated he "loves" the song, saying it was one of the best he had written in a very long time. He felt it fitting that it was the band's final single, as he called it "the best-sounding of them all."

== Personnel ==
- Noel Gallagher – lead vocals, rhythm guitar, piano
- Andy Bell – bass
- Gem Archer – lead guitar
- Zak Starkey – drums
- Jay Darlington – electronics, mellotron

== Other uses ==
The song was released as downloadable content for the video game Guitar Hero: World Tour on 29 January 2009.

The song was used in the opening sequence for the Production I.G anime Eden of the East, which first aired on Fuji TV's noitaminA timeslot on 9 April 2009. American and Canadian distributor FUNimation Entertainment announced a licence for the series and later announced that they will be able to include the song in their release but only on the first episode. The remaining episodes use the international theme song, "Michael ka Belial", by Saori Hayami.

== Music video ==
The video, directed by W.I.Z. in his third and final video with the band, depicts a woman (played by actress Natasha O'Keeffe), who is supposed to be part of the Royal Family who enjoys parties, one night stands and drugs. When she meets the band in the video, the members refuse to shake her hand because of the way she hides her party lifestyle . When the 'Princess' offers her hand to Noel Gallagher he, standing alongside Liam, declines to bow and turns away in disdain. King Charles III (then-Prince of Wales) appears at the conclusion of the video. This remains Oasis' last music video.

An alternate video was created by Production I.G, a lyric video featuring imagery from the Eden of the East opening as well as apples and statues of horses and cherubs.

== Track listing ==
All songs written by Noel Gallagher.

CD single

1. "Falling Down" (album version with extended intro) – 4:20
2. "Those Swollen Hand Blues" – 3:19
3. "Falling Down" (The Gibb Mix) – 5:12
4. "Falling Down" (The Prodigy version) – 4:20

7" vinyl

1. "Falling Down" (album version with extended intro)
2. "Those Swollen Hand Blues"

12" vinyl

1. "Falling Down" (Amorphous Androgynous A Monstrous Psychedelic Bubble remix) – 22:26

Digital bundle 1

1. "Falling Down" (album version with extended intro)
2. "Those Swollen Hand Blues"
3. "Falling Down" (demo)

Digital bundle 2

1. "Falling Down" (The Gibb Mix)
2. "Falling Down" (The Prodigy version)
3. "Falling Down" (Amorphous Androgynous A Monstrous Psychedelic Bubble remix)

In Japan

1. "Falling Down" (album version with extended intro) – 4:20
2. "Those Swollen Hand Blues" – 3:19
3. "Falling Down" (Amorphous Androgynous A Monstrous Psychedelic Bubble remix) – 22:26
4. "Falling Down" (The Gibb Mix) – 5:12
5. "Falling Down" (The Prodigy version) – 4:20

In Japan, Limited Edition Bonus DVD

1. "Falling Down" (music video; original version)
2. "Falling Down" (music video; Eden of the East version)

== Charts ==
Chart (2008)	Peak position
Canadian Hot 100	45
Dutch Singles Chart	71
Irish Singles Chart	26
Italian Singles Chart	19
Swedish Singles Chart	26
Chart (2009)	Peak position
Scottish Singles Sales (Official Charts)	2
UK Download Chart	37
UK Singles Chart	10
UK Indie (Official Charts)	1
US Hot Singles Sales (Billboard)	6
US Hot Dance Singles Sales (Billboard)	3
