= Dig Out Your Soul =

Studio album by Oasis
- Released: 6 October 2008
- Recorded: August 2007 – March 2008
- Studios: Abbey Road, London
- Genres: Alternative rock; psychedelic rock; hard rock
- Length: 45:51
- Label: Big Brother
- Producer: Dave Sardy

Oasis chronology
Stop the Clocks (2006)	Dig Out Your Soul (2008)	Time Flies... 1994–2009 (2010)

Singles from Dig Out Your Soul
- 1. "The Shock of the Lightning" Released: 29 September 2008; 2. "I'm Outta Time" Released: 1 December 2008; 3. "Falling Down" Released: 9 March 2009

Dig Out Your Soul is the seventh studio album by the English rock band Oasis. It was released on 6 October 2008 by Big Brother Recordings. The album was recorded between August and December 2007 at Abbey Road Studios in London, and mixed in January and March 2008 at The Village Recorder in Los Angeles. Production was handled by Dave Sardy, who had previously produced much of the group's sixth studio album, Don't Believe the Truth (2005). Lead guitarist Noel Gallagher wrote a majority of the songs, while three were written by Liam Gallagher as well as one contribution each from Gem Archer and Andy Bell.

The album was supported by three singles. The first single, "The Shock of the Lightning", was released shortly before the release of the album, on 29 September 2008. In addition to the standard release, there was also a limited edition boxset containing the album on CD, a bonus disc containing extra material and remixes, a DVD with a documentary of the making of the album, four 12-inch vinyl discs that contained all the music from the CDs cut in high-quality 45 rpm and a hardback book of album artwork.

Dig Out Your Soul received positive reviews from critics for its harder rock and psychedelic rock sound that the band created, and it was a commercial success. The album was supported by the Dig Out Your Soul Tour, debuting in Seattle at the WaMu Theater, and continuing for eighteen months. In August 2009, after nearly completing the British part of the tour, the brothers argued backstage at the Rock en Seine festival near Paris, cancelling their appearance and the rest of the tour, with Noel later announcing that he had left the band.

The Gallagher brothers later reconciled and reformed Oasis in 2024, touring in 2025 and scheduled for 2027, but they did not produce any new material.

== Concept and sound ==
In a January 2007 interview for NME, Noel Gallagher gave new details on his vision for the album: "All the tunes I've written recently have been on the kind of acoustic side, you know? But for the next record I really fancy doing a record where we just completely throw the kitchen sink at it", he explained. "We haven't done that since Be Here Now. I'd like to get, like, a 100-piece orchestra and choirs and all that stuff. I think since Standing on the Shoulder of Giants we've been trying to prove a point of just bass, drums, guitar and vocals and nothing fancy. But I kind of like fancy! I'd like to make an absolutely fucking colossal album. You know? Like literally two orchestras, stuff like that."

In October 2007, Noel revealed more about the record to BBC 6 Music: "Funnily enough, we all write separately, but for some reason all the songs sound like they've got a common thread. We've been focusing round the grooves more this time, the last album was quite 'songy,' if that makes any sense, I don't know. But it was quite 'songy:' "The Importance of Being Idle", "Let There Be Love" – it was quite a British, retro, 60s sounding album. This is kinda focusing round the grooves more. Saying that, we've only done two tracks but all the demos that we've done are great." Noel also revealed details about his lyrics for his new songs: "I've literally got nothing left to write about: I've wrote about being a youth, and I've wrote about being a rock star, and I've wrote about living life in the big city. I've been re-visiting some of my more psychedelic trips of a younger man, because I remember them all you see...putting them to music."

In a November 2007 interview with Reuters, singer Liam Gallagher revealed more details on how the record was going: "All the songs are wrote, this record's gonna be fuckin' rockin'. There's no acoustic on it, man. We rehearsed about 10 tunes before coming in. Three are mine. Some are Noel's, some are Gem's, some are Andy's. We're there for a long time, so we just keep pickin' em off the tree, man. Some are sounding really fucking heavy, and then we're picking some out, and you go, 'Well that doesn't sit with that, right.' So we just keep moving about. We've got plenty of songs. We're not gonna go bored." Gallagher also revealed that the record, "Will have everything thrown at it. Let's just hope that Noel's learnt his lesson in the studio this time!"

In a 15 June 2008 interview with talkSPORT, Noel said the album was "colossal", "rockin'" and added "it's gonna sound great live, which is the most important thing." Between various songs on the album are several interludes (such as the sound of someone walking down a beach). Oasis have described these as "bits inbetween".

== Recording ==
For the recording of Dig Out Your Soul, Oasis reunited with Don't Believe the Truth producer Dave Sardy at Abbey Road Studios in Westminster. Sessions began in July/August 2007 and concluded around Christmas with intermittent breaks. There was a brief period of confusion in which it seemed that Oasis would have had to forgo recording at Abbey Road due to U2 having reserved the recording areas that Oasis wished to use far in advance. The issue was resolved when Noel bought U2's spot in cash without the band's knowledge; this was possible because the studios gave preference to cash payments over credit, which U2 had been booked with. Zak Starkey was made an official member during the sessions.

The album art was created by artist Julian House. Ralph Steadman suggested the phrase "Dig Out Your Soul" for the album's title, a line in the song "To Be Where There's Life". According to Noel, "We gave him [Steadman] the album, he listened to it and we gave him the lyrics… He came back with a list of titles and one of them was Dig Out Your Soul. Noel's only instruction was "As long as we don't call it Oasis I don't give a fuck". Mixing took place in Los Angeles, and was slowed by constant equipment failure. After the album was completed, the band began discussions with several record companies with which to release it. In August 2008, Reprise Records announced that it would distribute Dig Out Your Soul in North America. The songs "(I Wanna Live in a Dream in My) Record Machine" and "Come on Outside" were planned to be on Dig Out Your Soul, but were ultimately left off, as according to Noel, Liam "ran out of time" to record them. The former later appeared on Noel Gallagher's High Flying Birds' 2011 eponymous album, while the latter resurfaced in 2020 on the band's EP Blue Moon Rising.

== Promotion ==
=== Official advertising, guerrilla marketing in the UK ===
Advertising billboard in Hunslet, Leeds

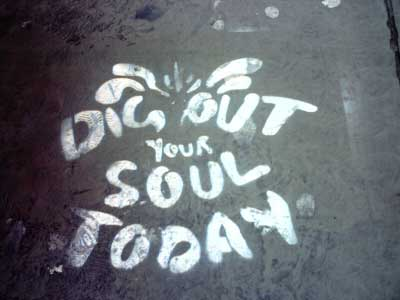
Spray Tag at Liverpool Lime Street Underground Station

British creative agency Intro was responsible for the Dig Out Your Soul promotion. Initially they were approached only for the album cover, for which the band chose Intro's creative partner Julian House, who became the campaign's art director. Promotion in the United Kingdom included television advertising and the use of billboards throughout major cities in the UK. Advertising was also taken in national newspapers around the time of the album's release. The album was also advertised for free on social networking website, Myspace. The comedian Russell Brand, a friend of Noel Gallagher, lent his voice to the album's TV campaign.

In London, Leeds, Glasgow, Brighton and Liverpool, coinciding with the launch of the album, the logo of the album appeared as a spray tag on pavements, including on the forecourt of the just newly opened Shepherd's Bush station.

=== Busking in New York ===
Sheet music and lyrics were given to several busking bands around the New York area. It was reported through the band's official website that four songs ("The Turning", "(Get Off Your) High Horse Lady", "Bag It Up" and "The Shock of the Lightning") were performed by the bands on the streets of New York. It was reported by The New York Times that these buskers were selected after applying online through the band's official website. An official video from the band's website shows Gem Archer, Andy Bell and Liam Gallagher present during the rehearsals of the new songs.

=== Songbook ===
To coincide with an "Oasis extravaganza" issue of NME magazine on 16 September 2008, a free songbook was included which featured chords and lyrics to three songs: "Bag It Up", "The Turning" and "(Get Off Your) High Horse Lady". There are also various album and band images in the booklet. Also included is a CD-ROM with interviews from all band members, wallpapers, various competitions and a two-part video tutorial on how to play "Supersonic".

=== Other media ===
"Bag It Up", "The Shock of the Lightning" and "Waiting for the Rapture" is featured as downloadable content in the Oasis Track Pack for Guitar Hero World Tour. The rest of the album was made available on 29 January 2009. Additionally, "Falling Down" was featured as the opening theme song to the anime series Eden of the East.

"The Shock of the Lightning", "I'm Outta Time" and "Falling Down" were released as singles. A remix version of "Falling Down" by the Chemical Brothers was first released as a free-download in August 2008, followed by an official release in March 2009.

An instrumental version of the album consisting of just the backing tracks was released by Big Brother Recordings on 21 December 2011.

== Reception ==
Professional ratings
Aggregate scores
Source	Rating
Metacritic	66/100
Review scores
Source	Rating
AllMusic	4.5/5 stars
The A.V. Club	B−
Entertainment Weekly	B−
The Guardian	3/5 stars
The Irish Times	4/5 stars
Los Angeles Times	2.5/4 stars
NME	8/10
Pitchfork	4.9/10
Rolling Stone	2.5/5 stars
Spin	3.5/5 stars

Dig Out Your Soul received generally positive reviews, with a score of 66/100 on Metacritic. Many critics lauded Dig Out Your Soul as one of the strongest albums ever recorded by the band, and noted that "it seems Oasis have made something that can happily play alongside Morning Glory." Jonathan Cohen of Billboard says that with Dig Out Your Soul, the group "Gets back to its stripped-down rock roots" and that the opening song, "Bag It Up" harks back to Definitely Maybe's "Columbia". Luke Bainbridge of The Observer gave the album 4 stars out of 5, saying "You could say that if Definitely Maybe was their Stone Roses, Dig Out Your Soul is their Second Coming. It won't win them any new fans, but those that believed the truth last time will dig this."

Not all reviews were positive; Jody Rosen of Rolling Stone gave the album 2½ out of 5 stars. Rosen said of the new album that, "Dig Out Your Soul is an almost comically generic Oasis release, from its preponderance of plodding midtempo rockers ("Bag It Up", "Waiting for the Rapture") to the vaguely Indian raga-flavoured psychedelic anthems ("To Be Where There's Life")."

In the UK, Dig Out Your Soul sold 90,000 copies on its first day of release, making it the second fastest selling album of 2008, behind Coldplay's Viva la Vida or Death and All His Friends. It debuted on the UK Albums Chart at number 1, with first-week sales of 200,866 copies, making it the 51st fastest selling album ever in the UK. The album debuted at number 5 on the Billboard 200 in the US, with 53,000 copies sold. It is the highest chart position of any Oasis album in the US since 1997's Be Here Now which debuted at number 2, but opening week sales were lower than for their previous album, Don't Believe the Truth. In France, Dig Out Your Soul peaked at number 4, spending a total of 32 weeks on the French album chart, the most ever by any Oasis album.

== Legacy ==
- Number 38 in Spin magazine's "Best Albums of 2008" list.
- Number 32 in Q magazine's "Recordings of 2008" list.
- Number 22 in NME magazine's "Best Albums of 2008" list.
- In 2011 it was voted number 207 in Q magazine's "250 Best Albums of Q's Lifetime" list featuring albums from 1986 to 2011.

== Track listing ==
Dig Out Your Soul track listing
No.	Title	Writer(s)	Length
1.	"Bag It Up"	Noel Gallagher	4:40
2.	"The Turning"	N. Gallagher	5:04
3.	"Waiting for the Rapture"	N. Gallagher	3:03
4.	"The Shock of the Lightning"	N. Gallagher	4:59
5.	"I'm Outta Time"	Liam Gallagher	4:10
6.	"(Get Off Your) High Horse Lady"	N. Gallagher	4:06
7.	"Falling Down"	N. Gallagher	4:20
8.	"To Be Where There's Life"	Gem Archer	4:35
9.	"Ain't Got Nothin'"	L. Gallagher	2:14
10.	"The Nature of Reality"	Andy Bell	3:47
11.	"Soldier On"	L. Gallagher	4:50
Total length:			45:48

iTunes Pre-Order
No.	Title	Writer(s)	Length
12.	"I Believe in All"	L. Gallagher	2:41
Total length:			48:29

Japanese version & Limited Korea Tour Edition
No.	Title	Writer(s)	Length
12.	"I Believe in All"	L. Gallagher	2:41
13.	"The Turning" (Alt. version No. 4)	N. Gallagher	4:57
Total length:			53:26

Box set bonus CD
No.	Title	Writer(s)	Length
1.	"Lord Don't Slow Me Down"	N. Gallagher	3:18
2.	"The Turning" (The Jagz Kooner Remix)	N. Gallagher	4:52
3.	"Boy with the Blues"	L. Gallagher	4:40
4.	"Falling Down" (The Chemical Brothers Remix)	N. Gallagher	4:27
5.	"The Shock of the Lightning" (The Jagz Kooner Remix)	N. Gallagher	6:40
6.	"I Believe in All"	L. Gallagher	2:41
7.	"To Be Where There's Life" (A Richard Fearless Production)	Archer	6:24
8.	"The Turning" (Alt. Version No. 4)	N. Gallagher	4:57
9.	"Waiting for the Rapture" (Alt. Version No. 2)	N. Gallagher	3:01
Total length:			41:00

Additional bonus track on the Italian Box set bonus CD
No.	Title	Writer(s)	Length
10.	"The Shock of the Lightning" (Primal Scream Remix)	N. Gallagher	4:25
Total length:			45:25

Box set bonus DVD
No.	Title	Length
1.	"Gold & Silver & Sunshine" (The Making of Dig Out Your Soul)	29:00
2.	"The Making of "The Shock of the Lightning" Video"	4:15
3.	"The Shock of the Lightning" (video)	4:13

== Personnel ==
Oasis

- Liam Gallagher – vocals (1–2, 4–5, 8–11), acoustic guitar (5)
- Noel Gallagher – electric and acoustic guitars, keyboards, electronics, drums (1, 3, 11), melodica (11), lead vocals (3, 6, 7), backing vocals
- Gem Archer – electric and acoustic guitars, keyboards, bass guitar
- Andy Bell – bass guitar, electric guitar, keyboards, tamboura

Additional personnel

- Zak Starkey – drums
- Jay Darlington – Mellotron, electronics (7)
- The National In-Choir – backing vocals (2)
- Dave Sardy – production, mixing
- Ryan Castle – engineering
- Andy Brohard – Pro Tools editing
- Cameron Barton – engineering
- Chris Bolster – engineering
- Ghian Wright – engineering
- Ian Cooper – mastering
- Alec Gomez/Lawrie Medina – assistant

== Charts ==
=== Weekly charts ===
Weekly chart performance for Dig Out Your Soul
Chart (2008)	Peak position
Australian Albums (ARIA)	5
Austrian Albums (Ö3 Austria)	13
Belgian Albums (Ultratop Flanders)	10
Belgian Albums (Ultratop Wallonia)	5
Canadian Albums (Billboard)	5
Danish Albums (Hitlisten)	13
Dutch Albums (Album Top 100)	11
European Albums (Billboard)	2
Finnish Albums (Suomen virallinen lista)	14
French Albums (SNEP)	4
German Albums (Offizielle Top 100)	8
Irish Albums (IRMA)	2
Italian Albums (FIMI)	1
Japan Hot Albums (Billboard Japan)	2
Japanese Albums (Oricon)	2
Mexican Albums (Top 100 Mexico)	12
New Zealand Albums (RMNZ)	6
Norwegian Albums (VG-lista)	11
Portuguese Albums (AFP)	27
Scottish Albums (Official Charts)	1
Spanish Albums (Promusicae)	14
Swedish Albums (Sverigetopplistan)	8
Swiss Albums (Schweizer Hitparade)	2
UK Albums (Official Charts)	1
US Billboard 200	5
US Top Rock Albums (Billboard)	3
US Indie Store Album Sales (Billboard)	3

=== Year-end charts ===
Year-end chart performance for Dig Out Your Soul
Chart (2008)	Position
European Albums (Billboard)	55
French Albums (SNEP)	144
Italian Albums (FIMI)	63
Japan Hot Albums (Billboard Japan)	92
Japanese Albums (Oricon)	72
UK Albums (OCC)	15

== Certifications and sales ==
Certifications and sales for Dig Out Your Soul
Region	Certification	Certified units/sales
Brazil (Pro-Música Brasil)	Gold	30,000^{‡}
Italy	—	70,000
Japan (RIAJ)	Gold	100,000^{^}
United Kingdom (BPI)	2× Platinum	600,000^{^}
^{^} Shipments figures based on certification alone.^{‡} Sales+streaming figures based on certification alone.
