= Wibbling Rivalry =

Single by Oas*s
- Released: 1995
- Recorded: 7 April 1994
- Studio: Forte Crest Hotel, Glasgow
- Genre: Interview
- Length: 14:32
- Label: Fierce Panda

"Wibbling Rivalry" is a single released under the name "Oas*s" by the Fierce Panda record label in 1995. It is a recording of John Harris (working for NME at the time) interviewing brothers Noel and Liam Gallagher of Oasis on 7 April 1994, on the verge of their commercial breakthrough.

The title is a play on the expression sibling rivalry with the word wibble, and was chosen by Fierce Panda co-founder and former NME journalist Simon Williams, whose choice of title puns featured on other releases on the label. The single's cover features English underworld figures Ronnie and Reggie Kray.

The single contains a 'Liam Track' featuring predominantly Liam's use of profanities and a 'Noel Track' featuring Noel. "Wibbling Rivalry" holds the record as the highest-charting interview release in the UK Singles Chart, reaching number 52 on 25 November 1995.

== Content ==
The interview is famous for featuring a violent argument between the brothers over an incident that occurred a few months prior. Sometime in early February 1994, Oasis was scheduled to perform for the first time outside of the U.K. at the Paradiso Club in Amsterdam. Executives from Sony Music, whom Oasis had recently signed a contract with, were to be in the audience. Liam incited a drunken brawl on board the overnight ferry from Manchester. The entire band (apart from Noel, who was not involved) was arrested and deported.

Noel expresses embarrassment over the incident and insists Oasis should be known for their music rather than any off-stage controversies, which the press reported on extensively at the time. At one point he becomes so frustrated he leaves, but continues the argument yelling from the bathroom.

Liam mocks Noel by imitating his mannerisms and brushes the ferry incident off. He and Harris point to previous rock bands such as the Sex Pistols and The Rolling Stones whose violent behavior gave them “an edge” and drummed up public interest in their music.

== Release ==
According to Williams, Fierce Panda took "a while" to dare themselves to release the single, due to Oasis being signed to Creation Records, who were owned by Sony Music. He explained: "We were quite worried. Then I got a call from Sony's lawyers and I thought, 'Uh-oh, this is it!' But they just said they loved it and asked me to send them a copy. And Noel was great about it." Both Liam and Noel approved of the release. Phil Sutcliffe noted that the release followed Oasis's major hit single "Wonderwall", which he said gave the band "fresh-minted iconic status", and described "Wibbling Rivalry" – a "Gallagher bros barney-cum-interview single" – as one of several "fond welcome accorded daft Oasis spin-offs" that affirmed the band's status at the time, alongside tribute band No Way Sis and the easy listening cover of "Wonderwall" by the Mike Flowers Pops.

== Critical reception ==
Gregor Muir reviewed the single for Frieze. Writing that if the listener is able to "ignore the Oasis-factor", the single still essentially consists of "two Northern men arguing". He counted Georgina Starr's video Crying (1993) and Tom Gidley's Thinking Out Loud: Proposal for a Sound Archive (1993) as then-recent precedents of "extreme, private emotion isolated at source", adding that "Gidley's imaginary sound archive—photographs of reel-to-reel tapes labelled 'Anxious', 'Confused', 'Excited' and 'Exhausted'—pre-empts a market for bootleg interviews with the Gallagher brothers where they display an emotion other than anger." In a 1996 article, Phil Sutcliffe of Q described "Wibbling Rivalry" as "the Troggs Tapes de nos jours, a merciless assemblage of outtakes from an early interview which exposed bare naked the sibs' capacity for foul-mouthed epiphanies of internecine daftness."

In a retrospective review for AllMusic, Chris True wrote that, released at the height of Oasis' fame, "Wibbling Rivalry" is "a testament to the tempestuous relationship that exists between Noel and Liam Gallagher. It is 14 minutes of bickering, profanity, and drunken pride that the serious Oasis fan will listen to over and over." He also noted the unusual nature of a bootleg charting in the UK. In 2000, Robin Bresnark of Melody Maker described the single as "legendary". In 2009, Ian Gittins of The Guardian described it as "Fierce Panda's most notorious 7in release", despite it not containing "a note of music". In 2016, Evan Minsker of Pitchfork described the release as "easily one of the best Oasis records".

== Track listing ==
1. "Noel Side... (A lot of swearing and cussing)"
2. "Liam Side... (Even more swearing and cussing)"
