= Eden of the East =

Japanese anime television series

- Cover art of the first Japanese DVD volume featuring Saki Morimi (left) and Akira Takizawa (right).

東のエデン (Higashi no Eden)
- Genre: Mystery; Political thriller; Psychological
- Created by: Kenji Kamiyama
- Anime television series
- Directed by: Kenji Kamiyama
- Produced by: Koji Yamamoto; Tomohiko Ishii
- Written by: Kenji Kamiyama
- Music by: Kenji Kawai
- Studio: Production I.G
- Licensed by: Crunchyroll (Note: In North America through Crunchyroll, LLC (formerly known as Funimation), in the United Kingdom through Crunchyroll UK and Ireland (formerly known as Manga Entertainment), and in Australia through Crunchyroll Store Australia (formerly known as Madman Entertainment). Manga Entertainment originally licensed the series in the United Kingdom in 2010 until its expiration in 2016.); UK: Anime Limited (former)
- Original network: Fuji TV (Noitamina)
- English network: US: Funimation Channel, Crunchyroll Channel
- Original run: April 9, 2009 – June 18, 2009
- Episodes: 11
- Novel
- Written by: Kenji Kamiyama
- Illustrated by: Chica Umino
- Published by: Media Factory
- Imprint: Da Vinci
- Published: September 18, 2009
- Anime film

Air Communication
- Directed by: Kenji Kamiyama
- Produced by: Kōji Yamamoto; Tomohiko Ishii
- Written by: Kenji Kamiyama
- Music by: Kenji Kawai
- Studio: Production I.G
- Licensed by: Crunchyroll; UK: Anime Limited (former)
- Released: September 26, 2009
- Runtime: 125 minutes
- Anime film

The King of Eden
- Directed by: Kenji Kamiyama
- Produced by: Kōji Yamamoto; Tomohiko Ishii; Hiroyuki Seda
- Written by: Kenji Kamiyama; Shōtarō Suga; Naohiro Fukushima; Shunpei Okada; Carlos Kasuga
- Music by: Kenji Kawai
- Studio: Production I.G
- Licensed by: Crunchyroll; UK: Anime Limited (former)
- Released: November 28, 2009
- Runtime: 85 minutes
- Anime film

Paradise Lost
- Directed by: Kenji Kamiyama
- Produced by: Kōji Yamamoto; Tomohiko Ishii; Hiroyuki Seda
- Written by: Kenji Kamiyama; Shōtarō Suga; Naohiro Fukushima; Shunpei Okada
- Music by: Kenji Kawai
- Studio: Production I.G
- Licensed by: Crunchyroll
- Released: March 13, 2010
- Runtime: 95 minutes
- Novel

The King of Eden - Paradise Lost
- Written by: Kenji Kamiyama
- Illustrated by: Chica Umino
- Published by: Media Factory
- Imprint: Da Vinci
- Published: April 23, 2010
- icon

Eden of the East (Japanese: 東のエデン, Hepburn: Higashi no Eden) is a Japanese anime television series, which was broadcast on Fuji TV's Noitamina timeslot from April to June 2009. Created, directed and written by Kenji Kamiyama, it features character designs by Chica Umino and animation production by Production I.G. It is the first original animation series broadcast on Noitamina.

A compilation of the TV series, Eden of the East Compilation: Air Communication, had a limited theatrical release on September 26, 2009. Two other theatrical films have also been released. Eden of the East Movie I: The King of Eden (taking place six months after the series) was released in Japan on November 28, 2009, and the second movie, Eden of the East the Movie II: Paradise Lost (taking place hours after The King of Eden), was released on March 13, 2010. The TV series and both films have been licensed for release in North America by Funimation (later known as Crunchyroll, LLC). The series premiered in the United States at Anime Expo in 2010.

== Plot ==
=== Anime series ===
On November 22, 2010, ten missiles strike Japan, but there are no casualties. The apparent terrorist attack is named "Careless Monday", and no one takes responsibility. Three months on, university graduate Saki Morimi visits New York City and then Washington D.C. for her graduation trip. Outside the White House, Saki encounters a naked Japanese man suffering from amnesia. The man, after receiving Saki's coat, follows the directions of a concierge, Juiz, on his unusual cell phone, to an apartment where he finds multiple fake passports, choosing the identity of Akira Takizawa. Saki appears to retrieve her passport, and they return to Japan, where a new missile has hit.

Takizawa discovers that his phone carries ¥8.2 billion in digital money, and that he is part of a game, where twelve individuals called Seleção are given ¥10 billion to save Japan in some way. The Seleção are able to contact Juiz, who can fulfill their orders for a price. However, if the money is used up completely or used for selfish purposes, the individual will be eliminated by the Supporter, the anonymous "twelfth man" of the group. During the search for answers, Takizawa learns he was involved in Careless Monday, transporting twenty-thousand NEETs to Dubai after they helped evacuate the missiles' targets before the attacks.

Takizawa also encounters other Seleção, including police officer Yūsei Kondō, neurosurgeon Dr. Hajime Hiura, and serial killer Kuroha Diana Shiratori, who targets rapists. Saki and her friends, who run a company called Eden of the East, eventually become involved in the conspiracies surrounding Takizawa. The company's name stems from a cell phone app that can recognize and provide details on items and people via social networking.

Takizawa meets Yutaka Itazu, a hikikomori and hacker, who studies Takizawa and the deceased Kondō's phones, able to access the Seleção requests. They discover Takizawa did not launch the missiles, but it was orchestrated by two other Seleção, Daiju Mononobe and Ryō Yūki. After Takizawa leaves, Itazu discovers sixty more missiles will be launched, but is run over by Mononobe before he can inform Takizawa. However, Itazu sends the Seleção database to Eden beforehand and recovers in a hospital.

Mononobe approaches Takizawa, inviting him to his endgame. He explains that the game's organizer, Mr. Outside, is actually Saizō Atō, an elderly businessman who helped rebuild post-war Japan; Mononobe believes Atō has since died. Traveling to Atō's business facility, Mononobe reveals to Takizawa that Juiz is an advanced artificial intelligence, housed in twelve supercomputers. Takizawa objects to Mononobe and Yūki's plan and leaves, but not before they reveal Takizawa's made himself a martyr to defend the NEETs from being accused as terrorists, erasing his memory to protect them.

Takizawa reunites with Saki and Eden at his home, a shopping mall in Toyosu, just as the twenty-thousand NEETs return from Dubai on a cargo ship. Takizawa draws everyone to the roof, ordering them to suggest a countermeasure for the approaching missiles. Juiz summons the JSDF to intercept the missiles. Takizawa, knowing he will be unable to pose as a terrorist, asks Juiz to make him the "King of Japan", erasing his memory once again, but he slips his cell phone into Saki's pocket beforehand.

=== The King of Eden ===
Six months after the events of the series, Takizawa has disappeared, while Saki searches for his whereabouts. Juiz sends Saki a message he recorded before erasing his memory again, Takizawa instructing her to meet in their "special place". Following the missile strike, Eden became a successful business, and Takizawa has become a folk hero named the "Air King", his image marketed by Seleção, Jintaro Tsuji, hoping to turn him into a martyr or terrorist. Eden also learns Takizawa's last name has been changed to Iinuma, the same as the recently deceased Prime Minister of Japan. Tsuji spreads rumours that Takizawa is Iinuma's illegitimate son.

Saki, realizing that Takizawa's message may be alluding to Ground Zero in New York, travels there. She discovers a gun has been smuggled into her luggage, her cab driver fleeing with Takizawa's phone in the back. Saki eventually finds Takizawa, who does not recognize her. They retrieve her purse and Takizawa's phone from the cabbie, Takizawa accepting his lost identity. Eden, who have access to the Seleção database, learn Yūki destroyed his phone, and Dr. Hiura is alive, his memory erased by the Supporter. They later discover that Mononobe has hacked their systems, forcing them to shut Eden down.

Takizawa hopes to find out what became of his mother, traveling with Saki to a carousel where they find a golden ring left there by his mother. They are attacked by men working for Iinuma, and film director Taishi Naomoto, a fellow Seleção, but he is arrested. Kuroha aids Takizawa, informing him that he must return to Japan to confirm his illegitimacy as the Prime Minister's son. Mononobe begins targeting a series of trucks, actually housing the individual Juiz supercomputers, with missiles. He destroys the Supporter and Tsuji's trucks, while Kuroha sacrifices her own to keep Takizawa in the game. She leaves while Takizawa and Saki fly to Japan.

=== Paradise Lost ===
Takizawa and Saki arrive in Japan, meeting Iinuma's widow Chigusa, who removes several strands of Takizawa's hair for a DNA test. Takizawa is separated from Saki, asking her to track down his mother by identifying his pet dog through Eden. Takizawa later escapes his escorts by swapping places with one of the NEETs. He contacts Eden, who have retreated to the university campus, informing him of the Juiz trucks.

Saki and her friend Satoshi Osugi track down Takizawa's mother, Aya, who runs a bar. She admits she lived in New York and had a fling with Iinuma, but does not confirm or deny the identity of Takizawa's father. Aya flees when Mononobe sends police to interrogate her. Takizawa tracks down his Juiz truck, meeting up with Eden members Micchon and Sis, who hijack Mononobe's truck. Eden's leader Kazuomi Hirasawa meets Saizō Atō, discovering he is alive and works as a cab driver, doubling also as the Supporter.

Takizawa and Eden arrive at Iinuma's house, where Mononobe meets Takizawa. Mononobe asks him to retire from the game so he can win and take control of the government. Takizawa agrees as long as Mononobe becomes Prime Minister, but the latter declines. Takizawa goes ahead with his own endgame, addressing Japan using the "Airship" phone app, roleplaying as a terrorist but encourages society to change their country for the better. In a final act, he gives all the recipients one yen each.

Impressed, Atō ends the game, declaring all of the Seleção as winners. As a farewell gift, he erases their memories of the game over the phones. However, Takizawa is unaffected, immune to its effects. Mononobe leaves, running into Yūki, who is unaware of what has happened, and tries to murder Mononobe for abandoning him. Mononobe crashes his car, running over Yūki in the process. Takizawa checks the DNA test, discovering he is unrelated to her husband. He departs, kissing Saki and promising to meet her again. In the epilogue, Saki narrates how Eden shut down for a while to support the NEETs. In a final scene, Takizawa meets Atō, and they drive off to speak about future plans.

== Characters ==
=== Main ===
Akira Takizawa (滝沢 朗, Takizawa Akira)
Voiced by: Ryōhei Kimura (Japanese); Jason Liebrecht (English)
A young man who lost his memory because of a brainwashing program, Akira Takizawa meets Saki Morimi in Washington D.C., appearing naked and only carrying a handgun and an extremely advanced cell phone with the phrase "noblesse oblige" printed on it and 8.2 billion yen in digital money credit. When Saki is questioned by police after she throws a coin in the grounds of the White House, he helps her out and she gives him her coat to thank him. When he makes his first call, a female voice claiming to be "Juiz" answers. She sends him a map that marks an apartment building where he is apparently staying. In his apartment, he finds guns and many different passports which seem to all belong to him. Saki follows after realizing she left her passport in the coat she gave him and the two decide to return to Japan together. His real name and DOB are unknown; his current identity as Akira Takizawa was chosen from the passports he found, which lists that in Toyosu, Japan and that he was born on January 7, 1989, one day younger than Saki Morimi.
Saki Morimi (森美 咲, Morimi Saki)
Voiced by: Saori Hayami (Japanese); Leah Clark (English)
Saki Morimi is a young woman in her last year in university. After her parents died, she has been living with her married elder sister and her family, who have been supporting her through college. She visits New York City as part of her graduation trip but leaves her friends to visit Washington D.C. alone. At the start of the series, she throws a coin at the White House lawn and is approached by police, but Akira Takizawa bails her out of trouble. After realizing that her passport is in the coat she gives to Akira, she follows him, and later goes back with him to Tokyo, Japan. She tries to get a job so that she does not become reliant on her sister's family, but after her interview with her brother-in-law's former company goes badly, she follows Akira on his adventures and gets her old club, "Eden of the East", to partner with Akira on their business venture.

=== Eden of the East club ===
The Eden of the East club started out as a small recycling group, but has quickly turned into a springboard for a successful commercial website, thanks to Micchon's revolutionary image recognition engine that resides in the Eden website and Saki's ability to improve the value of any item, including junk. Soon, the site's ability to work on phones attracted many student subscribers. However, after the students abused the social matchmaking abilities where a girl dropped out and the university launched an investigation, the team slowed development on the project. In addition to Saki, who handles public relations, the members include:

- Satoshi Ōsugi (大杉 智, Ōsugi Satoshi), a friend of Saki who holds unrequited love for her. He is the first among the club members to join the corporate world. He is voiced by Takuya Eguchi in Japanese and by Michael Sinterniklaas in English.
- Kazuomi Hirasawa (平澤 一臣, Hirasawa Kazuomi), the de facto leader of Eden of the East. He has delayed his graduation with his ultimate goal to create a paradise for NEETs. He is voiced by Motoyuki Kawahara in Japanese and by J. Michael Tatum in English.
- Mikuru Katsuhara (葛原 みくる, Katsuhara Mikuru), nicknamed Micchon (みっちょん), a shy but frank girl who programmed the Eden of the East's image recognition system. She is also Hirasawa's cousin. She is voiced by Ayaka Saitō in Japanese and by Stephanie Sheh in English.
- Haruo Kasuga (春日 晴男, Kasuga Haruo), a club member who likes to sit inside the clubroom's rolltop desk. He notices Osugi had gone missing after he had dinner with him. He is voiced by Hayato Taioh in Japanese and by John Burgmeier in English.
- Sis (おネエ, Onee), a club member who reviews the legal documents. Her real name and age is unknown. She is voiced by Kimiko Saitoh in Japanese and Lydia Mackay in English.

The club has also used a consultant, Yutaka Itazu (板津 豊, Itazu Yutaka), a prodigious yet reclusive hacker nicknamed Panties (Pantsu) based on an alternate reading of the Kanji in his name, and the fact that he has been a shut-in since he lost his pants two years before the start of the series. He is voiced by Nobuyuki Hiyama in Japanese and by Newton Pittman in English. In the first movie, Eden of the East becomes a small business and the club members try to support Saki and Akira while tracking the Seleção activities.

=== Seleção and related characters ===
The Seleção (Portuguese: "Selection") are the participants of the game. Each carries a special "Noblesse oblige" cell phone that is credited with 10 billion yen which they must use to "save Japan". They can spend the money in whatever manner they wish, using a concierge named Juiz (Portuguese: "Judge" or "Referee") to accomplish the goal, however, any Seleção who uses up their money before they can complete their mission, who acts purely for self-interest, or does nothing with the phone for an extended period of time will be eliminated by a person (one of the twelve) called "The Supporter". Similarly, if someone breaks the rules they will be eliminated. When someone is declared the winner of the game, the other eleven are eliminated. The person who created the game is named "Mr. Outside."

Pictures of known Seleções during the first film. Number 7 is the only Seleção not revealed in the anime.

Daiju Mononobe (物部 大樹, Mononobe Daiju)
Voiced by: Atsushi Miyauchi (Japanese); John Gremillion (English)
Seleção No. 1.
Mononobe is one of the main antagonists in the series. A former bureaucrat, he has connections to many of the political leaders in Japan. He maneuvers to become an executive (CEO in the TV series English dub) of the ATO Institution. He brings Akira to the ATO headquarters and reveals more information about his past with the hopes of recruiting him to his side. His ambition is not only to win the game, but to replace Mr. Outside himself as he assumes Mr. Outside is dead. According to him, Japan is in a state of apathy caused by the economic prosperity it has obtained since the end of World War II, and the strong political influence from countries like the United States into their society, thus he plans to save the country by rallying the population with a wide scale terrorist attack. However, Akira and the NEETs recruited by him managed to foil his plans, first with Careless Monday, and then by countering the missiles at the end of the regular TV series. In the King of Eden movie, he uses the Japanese police Public Security Dept to investigate the Eden of the East group, which has been involved with Akira Takizawa's activities. Using his connections with the government, he intends to pass a "100% Inheritance Tax Bill" in order to combat Akira's plan with the NEETs. In Paradise Lost, he reveals that he plans to overthrow the current government and install a more powerful one at the cost of individual freedom. After his memory is wiped when Mr. Outside ends the game, Mononobe crashes his car after being shot at by a crazed Yūki. It is unknown whether he survives or not.
Jintarō Tsuji (辻 仁太郎, Tsuji Jintarō)
Voiced by: Kōji Yusa (Japanese); Todd Haberkorn (English)
Seleção No. 2.
Tsuji, nicknamed "2G", is a Seleção working with Mononobe and Yūki. He seems to care very little about Mr. Outside's "game" and wishes simply for it to be over as soon as possible. He claims he has not spent any of the 10 billion yen he was given. In the King of Eden movie, he begins to make his move, by making Takizawa the main figure of a major trend and idol. He is responsible for marketing Takizawa as the "Air King", with advertisements and merchandise depicting Akira's pose while averting the missile crisis. Ultimately he plans to have Takizawa sacrificed as a martyr and hero of Japan. He is technically eliminated from the game when Mononobe destroys his trailer, but later loses his money when Mononobe arranges to have him investigated by tax auditors.
Toshiko Kitabayashi (北林 敏子, Kitabayashi Toshiko)
Voiced by: Reiko Seno (Japanese); Juli Erickson (English)
Seleção No. 3
Seleção 3 appears to be an elderly purple-haired woman according to the Seleção listings in The King of Eden, but takes action in the second film. She makes her first call to Juiz to order some food. It is revealed at the end of the film that she is in fact hospitalised, and graciously thanks Mr. Outside for the game.
Yūsei Kondō (近藤 勇誠, Kondō Yūsei)
Voiced by: Hiroshi Shirokuma (Japanese); Christopher Sabat (English)
Seleção No. 4.
A detective in Japan. After spending almost all of his money without accomplishing the mission given by Mr. Outside, he steals Akira's cellphone in order to take possession of his cash, but his plans are thwarted when he is informed by Juiz that a Seleção's money can only be used by its rightful owner. He is stabbed by his wife while attempting to return the phone to Akira, but manages to warn him of how dangerous the game is before dying.
Hajime Hiura (火浦 元, Hiura Hajime)
Voiced by: Shinji Ogawa (Japanese); Kent Williams (English)
Seleção No. 5.
Hiura is a 52-year-old former talented doctor specializing in neurosurgery. Due to an accident, his hands are unable to be used in surgeries that require precise accuracy, and eventually he resigns. Based on his former thought that the number of patients a doctor can help is limited, Hiura uses the cellphone to aim for the ideal treatment for all illnesses. He is eliminated by the Supporter after spending all of his money, and although he failed to save Japan, he tells Akira that he succeeded in his own mission. In The King of Eden movie, it's revealed that the Supporter didn't kill him; instead he erased his memories.
Taishi Naomoto (直元 大志, Naomoto Taishi)
Voiced by: Hiroyuki Yoshino (Japanese); Jessie James Grelle (English)
Seleção No. 6.
Naomoto (Note: Naomoto is spelled as Jikimoto in the English closing credits for the Eden of the East movies.) appears in The King of Eden movie as one of the major antagonists. A film director who intends to film the "ideal movie," with Akira and Saki as the main characters, and to ultimately kill them in a way that has never before been seen in film. For that reason, he causes Saki and Akira a lot of problems, because he figures that the prince will come to save 'the damsel in distress'. His ill-conceived plot is foiled thanks to Shiratori's successful extraction of Takizawa and Saki in her Porsche Cayenne. He is last seen in police custody in America.
Akira Takizawa
Seleção No. 9.
Takizawa's position as Seleção No. 9 is revealed early on, although at first he does not understand what it means because he is suffering from amnesia.
Ryō Yūki (結城 亮, Yūki Ryō)
Voiced by: Masakazu Morita (Japanese); Jerry Jewell (English)
Seleção No. 10.
The perpetrator responsible for the missiles fired on Careless Monday. Despite this, Yūki is very meek and shows hesitation when forced to assist in the silencing of Panties. He allies with Mononobe, as they have similar goals. Yūki's motivation for Careless Monday was to take revenge against the society he hated. He was forced to work to support his ill parents and felt cheated by the system. In The King of Eden movie, he appears to be inactive, but he reveals to Tsuji that he has broken his phone in a bid to evade Mononobe, who is tracking him, resulting in his elimination from the game. He soon becomes obsessed with getting revenge against Takizawa. Since Yūki broke his phone and does not receive Mr. Outside's final message, Yūki's memories are not erased when the game ends. However, he is run over by Mononobe's car when he attempts to murder Takizawa. It is unclear whether he survives or not.
Kuroha Diana Shiratori (白鳥・D・黒羽, Shiratori Daiana Kuroha)
Voiced by: Rei Igarashi (Japanese); Christine Auten (English)
Seleção No. 11.
Shiratori is president of a model agency by day; however, by night she is a serial killer. She uses the Noblesse Oblige cellphone to clean up evidence of her murders and cover up her crimes. She kills men by severing their penises ("Johnnies") with a cigar cutter. However, she only targets men who have victimized women, such as rapists, inspiring her current actions as a Seleção. In The King of Eden movie, she allies with Akira, saving him from various problems. She is eliminated from the game when she shields Akira's Juiz trailer from a missile launched by Mononobe with her own trailer. Her memories presumably are erased along with those of the other Seleção when the game ends.
Saizō Atō (亜東 才蔵, Atō Saizō)
Voiced by: Hiroshi Arikawa (Japanese); Grant James (English)
Seleçao No. 12
A powerful businessman who helped build postwar Japan. He is later hinted to be Mr. Outside (ミスター・アウトサイド, Misutā Autosaido). An unseen and mysterious character, he chooses eleven Japanese citizens as Seleção and gives them the phones with their mission to bring stability to Japan in whatever manner they wish. However, he warns that he will send a "Supporter" to eliminate any Seleção who use up their money before they can complete their mission, acts selfishly, idles for an extended period of time, or breaks his rules.
Akira Takizawa later realizes that "Ato Saizo" is a pun for the Japanese pronunciation of "Outside." A football enthusiast, Saizo's inspiration for the Seleção name came from the Portuguese word for selection and the common nickname of Brazil's national team. (Note: Further evidence of Mr. Outside's enthusiasm for football is the Seleção's 'crest', which is in the style of a Brazilian escutcheon.) His true identity is not revealed until Paradise Lost, where he is an elderly man who has posed as a simple cab driver. Saizo also has four female helpers who call him "grandpa" and assist him with the game. All of the Seleção were passengers in his cab at some point, where he asked them how they would spend 10 billion yen, with the exception of Takizawa, who had met Atō Saizō when he stopped beside the taxi on a bicycle. After the events of the Paradise Lost film, Saizo declares all of the Seleção winners and has their memories erased to free them from the game. Takizawa manages to keep his memories and tracks down Saizo so that they can work together to improve Japan.
Juiz (ジュイス, Juisu) (Note: Juiz is the Portuguese word for both "Judge" and "Referee". The phones used to contact Juiz have a sword and scales, which are symbols normally used in courts to represent justice and law. The fact it also translates to "Referee" ties in with other Portuguese soccer terminology such as "Seleção" (the name of a national Soccer team).)
Voiced by: Sakiko Tamagawa (Japanese); Stephanie Young (English)
A mysterious female voice who acts as a concierge for the Seleção. She gives them information and provides for their requests to be answered, from executing large scale purchases to bribing authorities and conducting assassinations. In episode 10, it is revealed that Juiz isn't human but is an advanced artificial intelligence. In the King of Eden Movie, it is further revealed that there are twelve copies of Juiz, each housed in a device disguised as a cargo trailer. (The Juiz devices originally were stored in a facility that Mononobe found, but they were relocated to mobile platforms, leaving behind large holes at the facility). When a Seleção is removed from the game, their trailer is scrapped, or alternately, a Seleção is removed if their trailer is destroyed. Judging by the differing reactions of the various Juizes, the AIs appear to be independent entities, but initialized from the same generative code base. In episode 10, a woman appears at ATO headquarters with the same voice and manner of speech as Juiz; this serves to cast doubt on whether she is actually Juiz or whether her voice and personality (if not her memories) simply were used as the model for developing Juiz. In the Paradise Lost movie, the woman is revealed to be one of Mr. Outside's four quadruplet granddaughters: women who facilitate the requests that are given to the Juiz units.
Seleção No. 7 is never seen in the series or films, but Seleção No. 8, a middle-aged man, makes a cameo at the conclusion of the second film during Mr. Outside's closing statement.

== Production ==
The series was announced in 2008, denoting Kamiyama's involvement as creator, director and writer and Umino's involvement as character designer. It was also announced that two theatrical films were set to premiere on November 28, 2009, and March 2010 respectively, after the television series ended its original run. In March 2009, it was also announced that the series would premiere on Noitamina on April 9, 2009. On March 19, 2009, the official website to the series relaunched with a trailer, which announced that the opening theme would be "Falling Down" by English rock band Oasis, while the ending theme was "futuristic imagination" by Japanese band School Food Punishment.

On April 9, 2009, the series began its run of 11 episodes. On September 26, 2009, the studio released Eden of the East Compilation: Air Communication, a film retelling of the events of the series. The studio originally planned for a second season but decided instead that a pair of movies would be a better means of continuing the story; the films were released on November 28, 2009, and January 9, 2010, respectively.

In North America, the series was released on Blu-ray and DVD in 2010. The movies were released in 2011.

== Reception ==
The Japanese release of the first DVD volume debuted on July 29, 2009, in 23rd place on the Oricon video charts with 4,394 copies sold for the week of July 27 - August 2, 2009. The first volume of the Blu-ray Disc release was also released on that day, and debuted in 7th place on the SoundScan Japan Blu-ray Disc charts. The series has won numerous awards since its release, including the TV Feature Award at the 2009 Animation Kobe festival and the best television series of the year award at the ninth annual Tokyo International Anime Fair.

The series received high marks for its first episode in the Anime News Network Spring 2009 Preview Guide. Reviewers Theron Martin, Carlo Santos, and Casey Brienza each gave the first episode a rating of 4.5 out of 5, while Carl Kimlinger rated it a 5 out of 5.

In his review, Martin wrote that "this is not your normal anime series. If you're looking for the new season's most unusual entry, something well departed from all of the game adaptations, shonen action series, and cutesy romances, this one is it." Additionally, he praised the artistic aspects of "outstanding background art, appealing character designs, highly likeable lead characters, and a unique closer." He concluded that "this one does everything it can to draw viewers in with its first episode and get them to want to keep watching, and many will."

Santos commented that "there's only one reason this episode falls short of perfect: it's not until the end that the story really takes off", but also pointed out the "slick, expressive animation."

Brienza started her review saying "Well, what the heck; might as well be blunt right from the get-go: I loved it," but criticized the "hackneyed plot" and claimed it "has been ripped whole cloth from a Robert Ludlum novel." Her praise related to "the scrupulous, realistic detail of the Washington D.C. setting" and the "gentle, whimsical innocence" of "Chica Umino's character designs", as well as "the scatalogical [sic] humor... and tender hopes of the heroine which reminds me a lot of Hayao Miyazaki."

Kimlinger, while admitting "I am not a fan of Kenji Kamiyama", stated the episode was "a weird and charming start to a weird and charming show." He wrote that "the first few minutes of Eden are some of the funniest in recent memory", and commented that "both leads have a conspicuous excess of likeability, and Kamiyama displays a mastery of smiling humanism that would have been unthinkable earlier in his career". Like Brienza, he pointed out that "the debt Eden owes to The Bourne Identity is considerable", but concludes that "the result is, in a word, superb".

Writing for the Los Angeles Times, Charles Solomon ranked the series the fourth best anime on his "Top 10".

The Encyclopedia of Science Fiction described Eden of the East as a thoughtful anime that explores contemporary (as of early 2020s) Japanese social and economic problems, particularly economic stagnation, the political influence of an ageing population and the disenfranchisement of younger generations. It praised the first ten episodes for their engaging narrative and likeable protagonists, but criticized the television series' inconclusive ending. The encyclopedia also considered the two sequel films, The King of Eden and Paradise Lost, engaging and thoughtful, but found them overly subdued and similarly unsatisfying in their conclusions. While acknowledging that the complex social problems addressed by the story have no easy solutions, it argued that this did not compensate for the lack of a compelling climax.
