= Lord Don't Slow Me Down (song) =

2007 single by Oasis

Single by Oasis
- B-side: "The Meaning of Soul" (live); "Don't Look Back in Anger" (live)
- Released: 21 October 2007
- Recorded: 2004–2005
- Genre: Rock
- Length: 3:17
- Label: Big Brother
- Songwriter: Noel Gallagher
- Producers: Dave Sardy, Noel Gallagher

Oasis singles chronology
"Let There Be Love" (2005)	"Lord Don't Slow Me Down" (2007)	"The Shock of the Lightning" (2008)

Music video
- "Oasis - Lord Don't Slow Me Down (Official Video)" on YouTube

"Lord Don't Slow Me Down" is a song by English rock band Oasis. The song was released as a download-only single on 21 October 2007 and was also released on a limited edition 12-inch single in promotion of the release of Oasis' rockumentary of the same name, Lord Don't Slow Me Down. The song debuted at number ten in the UK Singles Chart, becoming Oasis' 21st UK top 10 and first single by the band not to reach the top 4 since 1994's "Cigarettes & Alcohol". It was also Oasis' first stand alone non-album single since "Whatever" in 1994.

Written and sung by Noel Gallagher, Gallagher described it as being "one of the best things, like The Who, The Yardbirds and the Jeff Beck Group combined, and it's got two drum solos on it!". Recorded during the Don't Believe the Truth sessions, the song was likely originally intended to be included on said album, but was removed from the final track list by Gallagher. In May 2008, an unreleased studio version with Liam Gallagher on lead vocals was leaked online.

This song was later included on Dig Out Your Soul bonus CD. Oasis never played the song live while the band was together, but Noel has since performed the song twice with his solo band Noel Gallagher's High Flying Birds.

== Reception ==
The song has been very well received by critics and fans. Commenting on the song, Noel said "You know there's a DVD coming out for Christmas... somewhat predictably. The title track was so brilliant that the powers that be said 'let's just put it out'." It debuted at number 10 on the UK Singles Chart, fell 21 places to number 31 in the second week and left the chart the week after. It became Oasis' lowest charting song since 1994's "Live Forever" (which also peaked at number 10), a factor likely aided by the lack of significant publicity, a tangible release, and corresponding album.

== Track listing ==
1. "Lord Don't Slow Me Down" – 3:17
2. "The Meaning of Soul" (Live at City of Manchester Stadium '05) – 2:32
3. "Don't Look Back in Anger" (Live at City of Manchester Stadium '05) – 5:38

== Charts ==
Chart (2007)	Peak position
UK Singles (Official Charts Company)	10
