= Beady Eye discography =

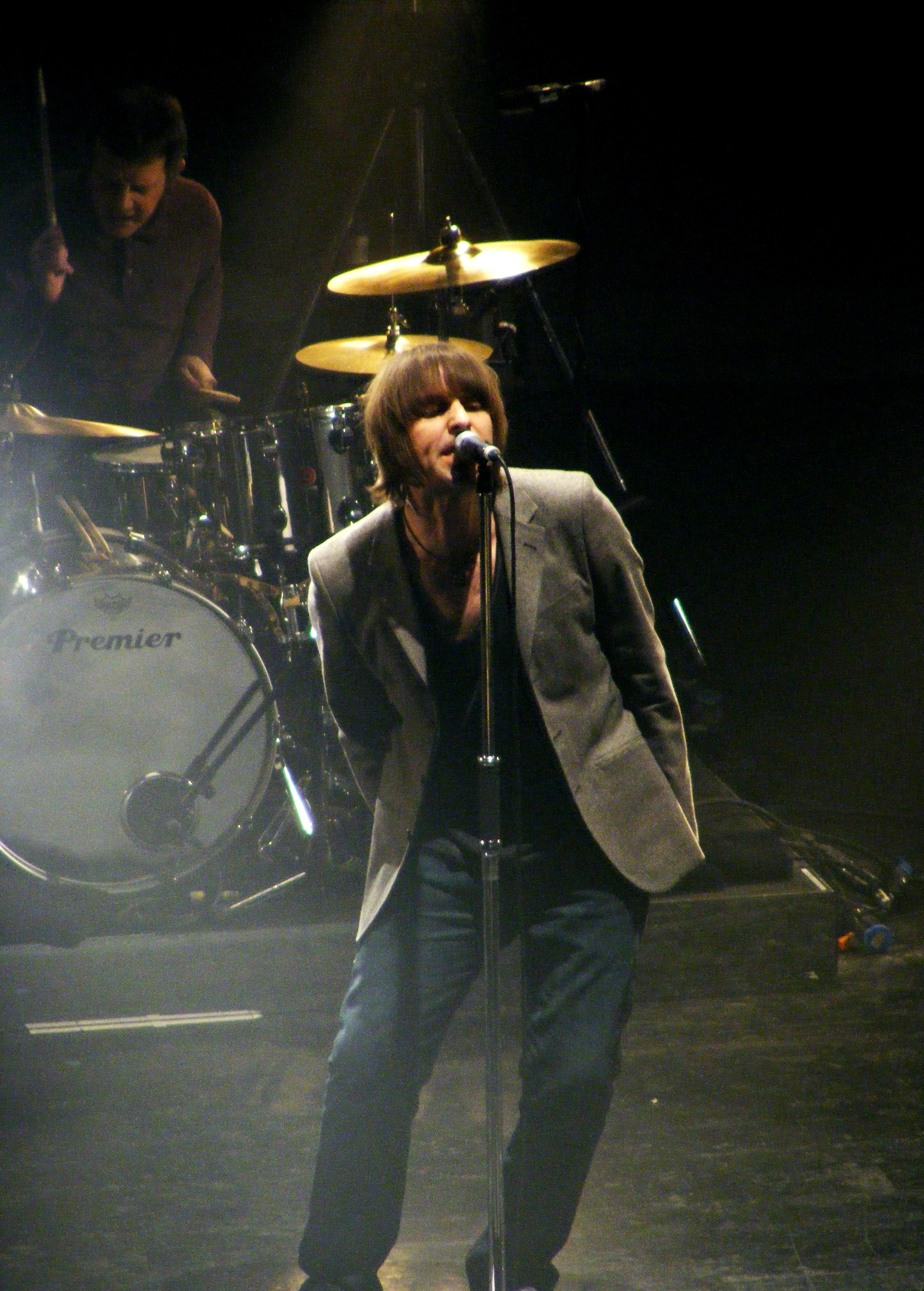
- Liam Gallagher and Chris Sharrock of Beady Eye performing at the Apollo Theater in 2011
- Studio albums: 2
- EPs: 1
- Singles: 11
- Music videos: 10
- Box sets: 2

The English rock band Beady Eye released two studio albums, one extended play, eleven singles and ten music videos. Formed in 2009, as one of two bands formed following the split of Oasis in 2009. The other is Noel Gallagher's High Flying Birds. The band consisted of vocalist Liam Gallagher, guitarists Gem Archer and Andy Bell, bassist Jay Mehler and drummer Chris Sharrock – with the exception of Mehler, all had previously been involved with the English rock band Oasis.

Their debut single "Bring the Light" was released in November 2010, peaking at number 61 in the United Kingdom and at number 82 in the Belgian region of Flanders. "The Roller" was their first UK top forty hit, peaking at number 31 – it also became a top ten hit in Japan. Different Gear, Still Speeding, Beady Eye's debut studio album, was released in February 2011. It peaked at number three in the United Kingdom and was later certified gold by the British Phonographic Industry. The album produced three additional singles: "Four Letter Word", "Millionaire" and "The Beat Goes On".

Beady Eye's second studio album BE was released in June 2013 and entered the UK albums chart at number 2, 1 place higher than their previous effort. It was preceded by the release of the single "Second Bite of the Apple", which peaked at number 112 in the UK, a commercial failure compared with the singles from Different Gear, Still Speeding. The second single from BE, the double A-side "Shine a Light" / "The World's Not Set in Stone", was released on 18 August 2013. The last single from the album, again the double A-side, "Iz Rite" / "Soul Love" was released on 25 November 2013.

== Studio albums ==
List of studio albums, with selected chart positions, sales figures and certifications
Title	Album details	Peak chart positions									Sales	Certifications
Title	Album details	UK	AUS	AUT	BEL	IRL	JPN	NLD	SWI	US	Sales	Certifications
Different Gear, Still Speeding	Released: 28 February 2011; Label: Beady Eye, Dangerbird; Formats: CD, LP, digital download	3	18	14	14	3	5	7	7	31	UK: 191,000	BPI: Gold
Be	Released: 10 June 2013; Label: Beady Eye, Dangerbird; Formats: CD, LP, digital download	2	81	26	23	4	10	37	17	—	UK: 78,000	BPI: Silver
"—" denotes a recording that did not chart or was not released in that territory.

== Extended plays ==
List of extended plays
Title	EP details
iTunes Festival: London 2011	Released: 30 July 2011; Label: Beady Eye, Dangerbird; Formats: Digital download

== Singles ==
List of singles, with selected chart positions, showing year released and album name
Title	Year	Peak chart positions					Album
Title	Year	UK	UK Indie	BEL	JPN	SCO	Album
"Bring the Light"	2010	61	5	82	—	—	Different Gear, Still Speeding
"Four Letter Word"	2011	114	13	—	—	—	Different Gear, Still Speeding
"The Roller"	2011	31	5	65	8	17	Different Gear, Still Speeding
"Millionaire"	2011	71	—	—	93	—	Different Gear, Still Speeding
"Across the Universe"	2011	88	—	—	—	—	non-album single
"The Beat Goes On"	2011	64	—	—	56	—	Different Gear, Still Speeding
"Flick of the Finger"	2013	138	—	97	—	—	BE
"Second Bite of the Apple"	2013	112	—	76	14	—	BE
"Shine a Light / The World's Not Set in Stone"	2013	—	—	111	—	—	BE
"Iz Rite / Soul Love"	2013	—	—	—	—	—	BE
"Flick of the Finger (Remix) / Soul Love (Remix)"	2014	—	—	—	—	—	non-album single
"—" denotes a recording that did not chart or was not released in that territory.

=== Other charted songs ===
List of songs, with selected chart positions, showing year released and album name
Title	Year	Peak chart positions		Album
Title	Year	UK	UK Indie	Album
"Two of a Kind"	2011	117	15	"The Roller" single
"Sons of the Stage"	2011	—	26	"Bring the Light" single
"—" denotes a recording that did not chart or was not released in that territory.

== Boxsets ==
Year	Album details	Notes
2011	Singles Box Set: Released: 2011; Label: Self Released; Formats: 7"	The box set includes all five 7" singles from Different Gear, Still Speeding. It was available through Beady Eye online store.
2011	7Inch Box Set: Released: 16 April 2011; Label: Dangerbird Records (DGB066); Formats: 7"	The box set released for the Record Store Day includes three 7" singles from Different Gear, Still Speeding: "Bring the Light", "Four Letter Word" and "The Roller". It also included three previously unreleased and exclusive live recordings of "The Beat Goes On", "Three Ring Circus" and "Millionaire" from KEXP radio as a digital download.; USA release only, limited to 2,000 copies.

== Music videos ==
List of music videos, showing year released and director
Title	Year	Director(s)
"Bring the Light"	2010	Charlie Lightening
"Four Letter Word"	2010	Julian Huse, Julian Gibbs
"Sons of the Stage"	2011	Charlie Lightening
"The Roller"	2011	Charlie Lightening
"Millionaire"	2011	Charlie Lightening
"The Beat Goes On"	2011	Charlie Lightening
"Flick of the Finger"	2013	released
"Second Bite of the Apple"	2013	released
"Shine a Light"	2013	released
"Soul Love"	2013	released
