= List of songs recorded by Beady Eye =

Songs recorded by Beady Eye

The following is a sortable table of all songs by Beady Eye:

- The column Song list the song title.
- The column Writer(s) lists who wrote the song.
- The column Album lists the album the song is featured on.
- The column Producer lists the producer of the song.
- The column Year lists the year in which the song was released.
- The column Length list the length/duration of the song.

== Studio recordings ==
| Song | Writer(s) | Album | Producer | Year | Length |
|---|---|---|---|---|---|
| "Across the Universe" (The Beatles cover) | Lennon–McCartney | "Across the Universe" (single) | unknown | 2011 | |
| "Back After the Break" | Gem Archer | BE: Deluxe Edition | Dave Sitek | 2013 | 4:09 |
| "Ballroom Figured" | Gem Archer | BE | Dave Sitek | 2013 | 3:31 |
| "Beatles and Stones" | Liam Gallagher, Gem Archer, Andy Bell | Different Gear, Still Speeding | Beady Eye, Steve Lillywhite | 2011 | 2:56 |
| "Blue Moon" | Lorenz Hart, Richard Rodgers | N/A | unknown | 2011 | |
| "Bring the Light" | Liam Gallagher, Gem Archer, Andy Bell | Different Gear, Still Speeding | Beady Eye, Steve Lillywhite | 2011 | 3:39 |
| "Dreaming of Some Space" | Andy Bell | BE: Deluxe Edition | Dave Sitek | 2013 | 1:51 |
| "Don't Brother Me" | Liam Gallagher | BE | Dave Sitek | 2013 | 7:30 |
| "Evil Eye"^{[C]} | Liam Gallagher | BE | Dave Sitek | 2013 | 5:01 |
| "Face the Crowd" | Andy Bell | BE | Dave Sitek | 2013 | 4:00 |
| "Flick of the Finger" | Liam Gallagher, Gem Archer, Andy Bell | BE | Dave Sitek | 2013 | 3:46 |
| "For Anyone" | Liam Gallagher, Gem Archer, Andy Bell | Different Gear, Still Speeding | Beady Eye, Steve Lillywhite | 2011 | 2:15 |
| "Four Letter Word" | Liam Gallagher, Gem Archer, Andy Bell | Different Gear, Still Speeding | Beady Eye, Steve Lillywhite | 2011 | 4:17 |
| "Girls in Uniform"^{[C]} | Andy Bell | BE | Dave Sitek | 2013 | 6:23 |
| "I'm Just Saying" | Andy Bell | BE | Dave Sitek | 2013 | 3:45 |
| "In the Bubble with a Bullet" | Liam Gallagher, Gem Archer, Andy Bell | "The Beat Goes On" (single) | unknown | 2011 | 2:57 |
| "Iz Rite" | Gem Archer | BE | Dave Sitek | 2013 | 3:26 |
| "Kill for a Dream" | Liam Gallagher, Gem Archer, Andy Bell | Different Gear, Still Speeding | Beady Eye, Steve Lillywhite | 2011 | 4:39 |
| "Man of Misery"^{[A]} | Liam Gallagher, Gem Archer, Andy Bell | "Millionaire" (single) | Beady Eye, Steve Lillywhite | 2011 | 2:38 |
| "Millionaire" | Liam Gallagher, Gem Archer, Andy Bell | Different Gear, Still Speeding | Beady Eye, Steve Lillywhite | 2011 | 3:19 |
| "Off at the Next Exit" | Liam Gallagher | BE: Deluxe Edition | Dave Sitek | 2013 | 3:36 |
| "Start Anew" | Liam Gallagher | BE | Dave Sitek | 2013 | 4:29 |
| "Second Bite of the Apple" | Gem Archer | BE | Dave Sitek | 2013 | 3:28 |
| "Shine a Light" | Liam Gallagher | BE | Dave Sitek | 2013 | 5:04 |
| "Sons of the Stage" (World of Twist cover)^{[A]}^{[B]} | Gordon King, Tony Odgen | "Bring the Light" (single) | unknown | 2010 | 4:46 |
| "Soon Come Tomorrow" | Andy Bell | BE | Dave Sitek | 2013 | 4:58 |
| "Soul Love" | Liam Gallagher | BE | Dave Sitek | 2013 | 5:10 |
| "Standing on the Edge of the Noise" | Liam Gallagher, Gem Archer, Andy Bell | Different Gear, Still Speeding | Beady Eye, Steve Lillywhite | 2011 | 2:52 |
| "The Beat Goes On" | Liam Gallagher, Gem Archer, Andy Bell | Different Gear, Still Speeding | Beady Eye, Steve Lillywhite | 2011 | 4:45 |
| "The Morning Son" | Liam Gallagher, Gem Archer, Andy Bell | Different Gear, Still Speeding | Beady Eye, Steve Lillywhite | 2011 | 6:03 |
| "The Roller" | Gem Archer | Different Gear, Still Speeding | Beady Eye, Steve Lillywhite | 2011 | 3:34 |
| "The World's Not Set in Stone" | Liam Gallagher, Andy Bell | BE: Deluxe Edition | Dave Sitek | 2013 | 4:46 |
| "Three Ring Circus" | Liam Gallagher, Gem Archer, Andy Bell | Different Gear, Still Speeding | Beady Eye, Steve Lillywhite | 2011 | 3:09 |
| "Two of a Kind" | Gem Archer | "The Roller" (single) | unknown | 2011 | 3:01 |
| "Wigwam" | Liam Gallagher, Gem Archer, Andy Bell | Different Gear, Still Speeding | Beady Eye, Steve Lillywhite | 2011 | 6:39 |
| "Wind Up Dream" | Liam Gallagher, Gem Archer, Andy Bell | Different Gear, Still Speeding | Beady Eye, Steve Lillywhite | 2011 | 3:27 |
| "World Outside My Room"^{[B]} | Liam Gallagher, Gem Archer, Andy Bell | "Four Letter Word" (single) | unknown | 2011 | 4:25 |
