= Four-letter word =

Euphemism for profanity

The term four-letter word serves as a euphemism for words that are often considered profane or offensive.

The designation "four-letter" arises from the observation that many (though not all) popular or slang terms related to excretory functions, sexual activity, genitalia, blasphemies, and terms linked to Hell or damnation are incidentally four-character monosyllables. Notably, the term "four-letter word" does not strictly refer to words containing exactly four letters.

The phrase has been in use in both the United States and the United Kingdom since at least 1886.

== History ==
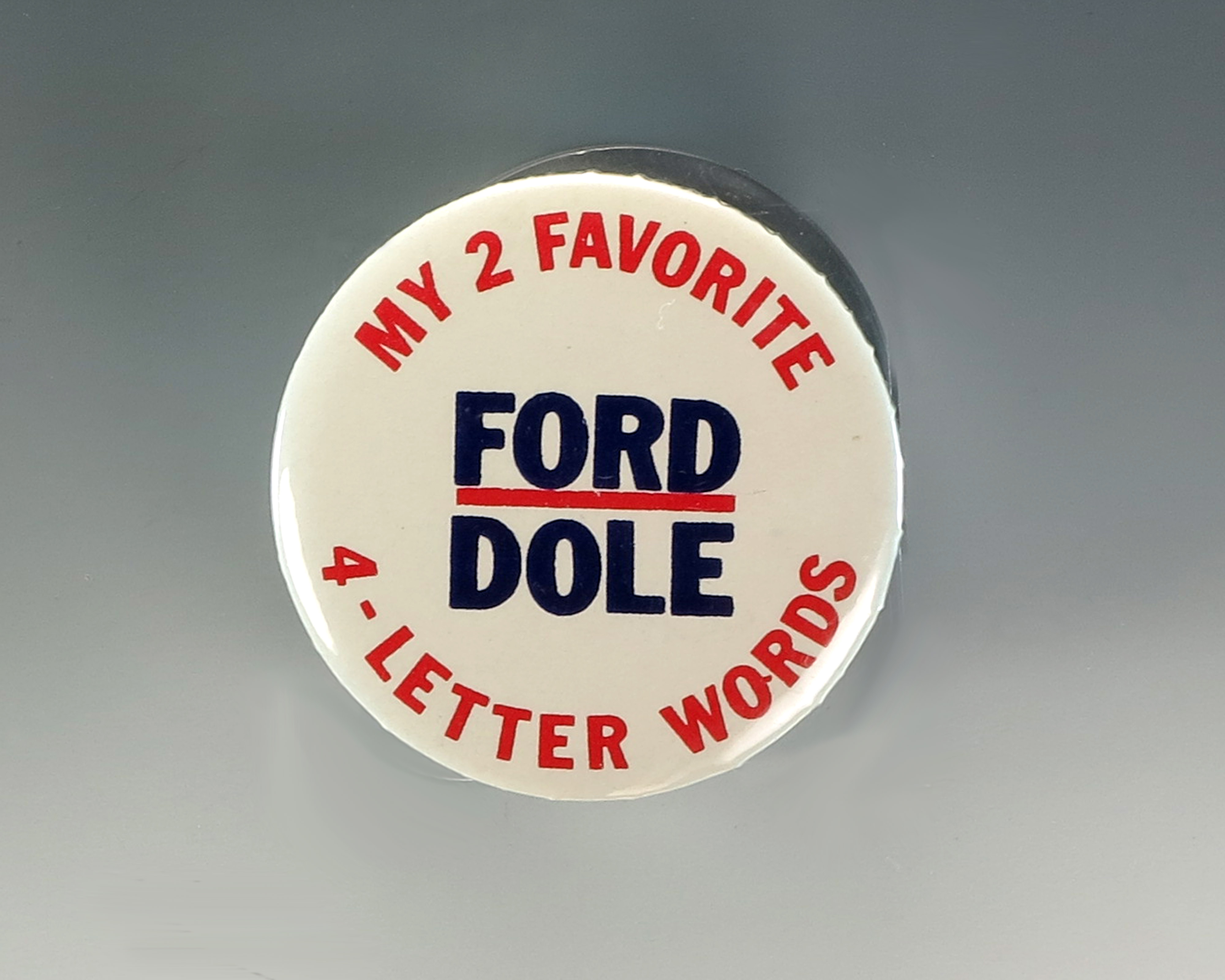
Campaign button used in the 1976 United States presidential election.

Common four-letter words (in this context) widely considered vulgar or offensive include: cunt, fuck (and regional variants like feck, fick, fock, and foak), jism (or gism), jizz, shit, slut, twat, and tits. Notably, the term piss (once an offensive swear word) has non-excretory uses (pissed off meaning "angry" in US English and British UK English; pissed meaning "drunk" in UK English and Australian English) and has occurred with its excretory meaning in the King James Bible. Some of these words have been deemed legally indecent under the regulations of the United States Federal Communications Commission (FCC) for TV and radio open-airwave broadcasting.

Other words of this length that may be upsetting due to religious or personal sensitivity include: arse (UK), damn, crap, hell, piss, wang, and wank (UK). Additionally, slurs related to racism, ableism, and an individual's sexual orientation may qualify, such as mong (in the UK not a racial slur, but short for Mongol, or someone with Down syndrome – previously called Mongolism), gook, kike, spic, coon, dago, and dyke.

Certain "four-letter words" have multiple meanings (some serving as given names) and usually only offend when used in their vulgar senses. Examples include: cock, dick, knob, muff, puss, shag (UK), and toss (UK). A borderline category includes words that are euphemistic evasions of "stronger" words and those that happen to be short, with both an expletive sound to some listeners and a sexual or excretory meaning (many also have other, non-vulgar meanings): butt (US), crud, darn, dump, heck, poop (US), slag (UK, NZ, AUS), slut, and turd.

Finally, some four-letter terms with limited usage can be considered offensive within the regional dialect they are used, such as mong and mary.

Occasionally, the phrase "four-letter word" is humorously used to describe common words composed of four letters. Examples include the word work, implying that work can be unpleasant, or the game of golf, jokingly referred to as a four-letter word when a player's pastime becomes an exercise in frustration. In 1993, Charlotte Observer journalist Doug Robarchek noted how many U.S. politicians have names with four letters, humorously observing, "Ever notice how many U.S. politicians have names that are also four-letter words? Ford, Dole, Duke, Bush, Gore ... and how many make us think of four-letter words?"

== Similar euphemisms in other languages ==
- Chinese: The term 三字經 (lit. Three Character Classic) is used to describe swearing, as many such phrases in Chinese consist of three characters.
- Dutch: A similar tradition occurs with "three-letter words", e.g. kut ("cunt"/"twat"), pik and lul ("cock"/"dick"/"prick").
- Finnish: Rude words tend to be five-letter words, like the common swear word perse meaning "arse", or paska meaning "shit". Other offensive five-letter words refer to the genital region, eg. kulli and kyrpä ("cock"/"dick"/"prick"), along with pillu and vittu ("twat"/"cunt").
- French: the word merde ("shit") is sometimes referred to as le mot de cinq lettres ("the five-letter word"), or le mot de Cambronne. Also, profanities in French are usually called gros mots (coarse words).
- German: the phrase Setz dich auf deine vier Buchstaben! ("sit down on your four letters") is mainly used speaking to children, as it refers to the word Popo, meaning "rump" in baby talk. A variant, Setz dich auf deine fünf Buchstaben! ("sit down on your five letters"), alludes to the vulgar use of the word Arsch, meaning "arse" (UK) or "ass" (US).
- Latin: a common insult used to be Es vir trium litterarum, meaning "you are a man of three letters". The underlying implication was that the addressed was a fur, meaning "thief", although if challenged, the speaker could always claim he simply meant vir, that is, "man".
- Polish: the word dupa ("arse"/"ass") is called cztery litery ("the four letters"). Historically, also kiep, which formerly used to be a taboo word meaning "female genitals", but presently is a mild or humorous insult meaning "a fool" or a modern slang term for a cigarette. There is also a phrase Siadaj na cztery litery (sit down on your four letter), meaning sit on your arse.
- Russian: the word хуй ("cock"/"dick"/"prick"), the most common obscenity, is called "the three-letter word" (russ.: "слово из трёх букв") or just "three letters" (russ.: "три буквы") and is one of the key words of the "Russian mat".

== In popular culture ==
=== Love ===
- "Love Is Just a Four-Letter Word" written by Bob Dylan and performed by Joan Baez
- "Four Letter Word" written by Ricki and Marty Wilde and performed by Kim Wilde.
- “Four Letter Word”, a song by Gossip from their album Music for Men. Besides “love”, “rain”, “same” and “face” are each referred to as another four-letter word.
- A television show called Love Is a Four Letter Word was produced by ABC in Australia.
- Love Is a Four Letter Word is a 2012 album by Jason Mraz.
- The song "How We Do ('93 Til)" by Freddie Gibbs on the 2009 mixtape The Miseducation of Freddie Gibbs features the line "love is a four-letter word like fuck and shit, so, love, you can suck my dick".

=== Work ===
- In a song sung by Cilla Black and covered by The Smiths, "Work Is a Four-letter Word", this phrase is used to describe work as obscene.
- Work Is a Four-Letter Word is the title of a 1968 British comedy film.

=== Five ===
- The Welsh rock band Lostprophets featured a song on their debut studio album The Fake Sound Of Progress called "Five Is A Four Letter Word."

=== Generic references, not specifying the word ===
- That Four-Letter Word is a 2006 independent film from India.
- The opening track of Beady Eye's 2011 album Different Gear, Still Speeding is entitled "Four Letter Word".

=== A specified word that does not actually have four letters ===
- The band Cake made a play on words in their song "Friend Is a Four Letter Word."

== See also ==
- Seven dirty words
- Tetragrammaton
