= Four Letter Word =

Four Letter Word may refer to:

- Four-letter word, a set of English-language words written with four letters which are considered profane

== Music ==
- "Four Letter Word" (Beady Eye song), 2011
- "Four Letter Word" (Def Leppard song), 2003
- "Four Letter Word" (Kim Wilde song), 1988
- "Four Letter Word", by Cheap Trick from One on One
- "Four Letter Word", by Echobelly from On
- "Four Letter Word", by Jessie J from R.O.S.E.
- "Four Letter Word", by Uncle Kracker from Midnight Special
- "Four Letter Words", by K.Flay from Inside Voices / Outside Voices, 2022
- "Four-Letter Words", written by Margo Guryan, sung by Miriam Makeba on All About Miriam, 1966
- "Four Letter Words", by Suzi Quatro from Suzi ... and Other Four Letter Words

== Other uses ==
- Four Letter Words, a 2000 film directed by Sean Baker
