= Hunwick =

Village in County Durham, England

Coordinates: 54°41′N 1°42′W

Hunwick is a semi-rural village in County Durham, England. There are actually two villages that are often referred to collectively as Hunwick, Hunwick and New Hunwick although it is generally accepted that the two villages are now as one. In the 2001 census Hunwick had a population of 952. This had grown to 1248 by the 2011 census.

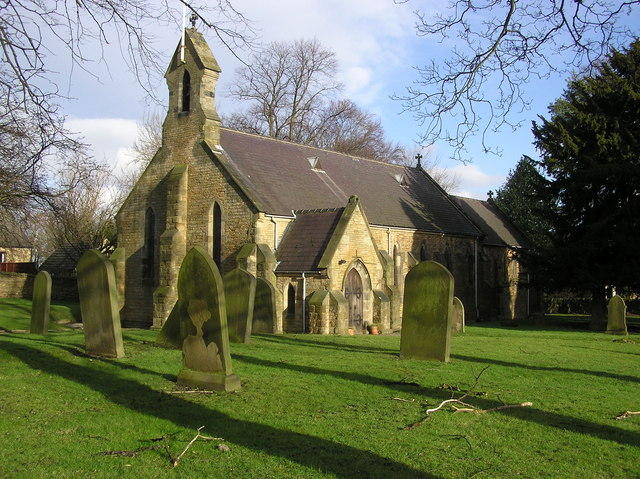
St. Paul the Apostle, Hunwick

Hunwick is an ancient village dating from Saxon times when it belonged to the Cathedral church of Durham. Hunwick stands between Bishop Auckland and Crook. It was later given to the Earls of Northumberland, but it returned to the ownership of the church when Henry VIII re-endowed Durham cathedral. The village itself was probably destroyed during the Harrying of the North in the late 11th century, and was rebuilt with two rows of houses arranged around the village green.

The remains of the medieval manor house of Hunwick is now a farmhouse; its former chapel has now been converted into a private residence by a local architect. All original features have been retained including the south facing window. Outside the farm gate is the remains of a gin gang, an engine designed to operate farm machinery and worked by horses. Helmington Hall to the north is also a farm, all that remains of a large house dating to about 1686.

There were two public houses, but The Joiners Arms is the sole pub now. The Quarry Burn is now a tea house. Hunwick's close proximity to the visitor attraction Kynren has made it a popular place to stay and use of the restaurants of the public houses have benefitted. It also has an active church.

Musician Gem Archer, who has played guitar in bands such as Oasis, Beady Eye, Noel Gallagher's High Flying Birds and Heavy Stereo, was born in Hunwick.

Stefan Bjornsson and Bjorn Vernhardsson, two history researchers from Iceland named Hunwick as a possible location for the Battle of Brunanburh in their book Brunanburh: Located Through Egil's Saga. Brunanburh has been described as the most important battle of England's history as it was the battle that sealed Æthelstan as King of all England.
