= The Beat Goes On (Beady Eye song) =

Single by Beady Eye

from the album Different Gear, Still Speeding
- B-side: "In the Bubble with a Bullet"
- Released: 15 July 2011
- Recorded: 2010
- Studio: RAK, London
- Genre: Rock
- Length: 4:44
- Label: Beady Eye
- Songwriters: Liam Gallagher, Gem Archer, Andy Bell
- Producers: Beady Eye, Steve Lillywhite

Beady Eye singles chronology
"Millionaire" (2011)	"The Beat Goes On" (2011)	"Second Bite of the Apple" (2013)

"The Beat Goes On" is a song by the English rock band Beady Eye. Featured on their debut album Different Gear, Still Speeding, it was the third official single released from the album, released on 15 July 2011. They performed the single on Alan Carr: Chatty Man, on 1 July 2011.

== Track listing ==
All songs written by Liam Gallagher, Gem Archer, and Andy Bell

1. "The Beat Goes On" – 4:44
2. "In the Bubble with a Bullet" – 2:57

== Chart performance ==
Chart (2011)	Peak position
Japan Hot 100 (Billboard)	56
UK Singles (OCC)	64

== Music video ==
A promotional music video was filmed at the Isle Of Wight festival 2011 and released shortly after.

== Release history ==
Country	Release date	Format(s)	Label
United Kingdom	15 July 2011	Digital download	Beady Eye
