= Millionaire (Beady Eye song) =

Single by Beady Eye

from the album Different Gear, Still Speeding
- B-side: "Man of Misery"
- Released: 2 May 2011
- Recorded: 2010
- Studio: RAK, London
- Genre: Rock
- Length: 3:17
- Label: Beady Eye
- Songwriters: Liam Gallagher, Gem Archer, Andy Bell
- Producers: Beady Eye, Steve Lillywhite

Beady Eye singles chronology
"The Roller" (2011)	"Millionaire" (2011)	"The Beat Goes On" (2011)

"Millionaire" is a single from English rock band Beady Eye, released on 2 May 2011.

== Track listing ==
All songs written by Liam Gallagher, Gem Archer, and Andy Bell.

1. "Millionaire" – 3:17
2. "Man of Misery" – 2:39

"Man of Misery" was originally used, in demo form, in a promotional video for the Liam Gallagher run clothing line Pretty Green, and was originally credited as a Liam Gallagher solo song. The song was originally available as an iTunes exclusive for those who downloaded the album.

== Music video ==
The accompanying promotional music video, directed by Charlie Lightening, was shot while the band were touring in Spain. In it, all four members of the band - plus live bassist, Jeff Wootton - drive through the Spanish countryside and along the coast, before ending up at a pub.

== Chart performance ==
Chart (2011)	Peak position
UK Singles (Official Charts Company)	71
