= Flick of the Finger =

Promotional single by Beady Eye

from the album BE
- Released: 15 April 2013
- Recorded: 2012–2013
- Genre: Psychedelic rock
- Length: 3:42
- Label: Beady Eye
- Songwriters: Liam Gallagher, Gem Archer, Andy Bell
- Producer: Dave Sitek

"Flick of the Finger" is the first song from British band Beady Eye's second album, BE, and the first song released from the album.

== Background and release ==
The song features a guest appearance from Kayvan Novak who reads out a passage from Tariq Ali's 1987 book, "Street Fighting Years: An Autobiography of the Sixties" (in turn quoting a, likely fictional, Jean-Paul Marat monologue from act 1, scene 23 of Peter Weiss' 1963 play "Marat/Sade") to close the track.

The music video for the song was made available to watch on the band's official website along with stems files as MP3s during the internet promotion. The stems were later released on Facebook and Twitter. The track debuted on Californian radio station KCRW on 4 April 2013. The official music video premiered on YouTube, on 11 April 2013.

The remix of "Flick of the Finger" backed with the remix of "Soul Love" was released on 7" single limited to 1000 copies in 2014.
