= Second Bite of the Apple =

Single by Beady Eye

from the album Be
- Released: 29 April 2013
- Recorded: 2012–2013
- Genre: Alternative rock
- Length: 3:29
- Label: Beady Eye
- Songwriter: Gem Archer
- Producer: David Sitek

Beady Eye singles chronology
"The Beat Goes On" (2011)	"Second Bite of the Apple" (2013)	"Shine a Light" / "The World's Not Set in Stone" (2013)

"Second Bite of the Apple" is the first single released from British band Beady Eye's second album, BE. "Second Bite of the Apple" was released along with B-side "Dreaming of Some Space" which used backmasking.

To promote the song Beady Eye performed 'Second Bite of the Apple' on the semi-final of the BBC talent show The Voice UK on 15 June 2013.

== Track listing ==
1. "Second Bite of the Apple" (Gem Archer) – 3:29
2. "Dreaming of Some Space" (Andy Bell) - 1:56

== Chart performance ==
As of 9 June 2013, "Second Bite of the Apple" had peaked at number 112 on the UK Singles Chart.

Chart (2013)	Peak position
Japan (Japan Hot 100)	14
