= The Roller =

Single by Beady Eye

from the album Different Gear, Still Speeding
- B-side: "Two of a Kind"
- Released: 23 January 2011
- Recorded: 2010
- Studio: RAK, London
- Genre: Rock
- Length: 3:37
- Label: Beady Eye
- Songwriters: Liam Gallagher, Gem Archer, Andy Bell
- Producers: Beady Eye, Steve Lillywhite

Beady Eye singles chronology
"Four Letter Word" (2011)	"The Roller" (2011)	"Millionaire" (2011)

"The Roller" is a single by the English rock band Beady Eye, featured on their 2011 debut album Different Gear, Still Speeding. The song was released as a digital single on 23 January 2011, following the release of a music video on 11 January. The 7" vinyl release is backed with the song "Two of a Kind".

== Track listing ==
All songs written by Liam Gallagher, Gem Archer and Andy Bell.

1. "The Roller" – 3:37
2. "Two of a Kind" – 3:01

== Music video ==
The music video for the song was shot in Wilburton, Cambridgeshire in December 2010 in sub–zero temperatures and shows the band playing while a motorcyclist rides the walls around them. It was premiered on Channel 4 on 11 January 2011, and released on YouTube shortly after.

== Chart performance ==
On digital release, the single debuted at number 31. However, it fell to number 68 the following week. It is the band’s only single to reach the UK top 40.

=== Weekly ===
Chart (2011)	Peak position
Belgium (Ultratip Bubbling Under Flanders)	33
Belgium (Ultratip Bubbling Under Wallonia)	15
Japan (Japan Hot 100)	56
Scotland Singles (OCC)	17
UK Singles (OCC)	31
UK Indie (OCC)	5

=== Year-end charts ===
Chart (2011)	Position
Japan (Japan Hot 100)	67
