= Jay Mehler =

American musician (born 1971)

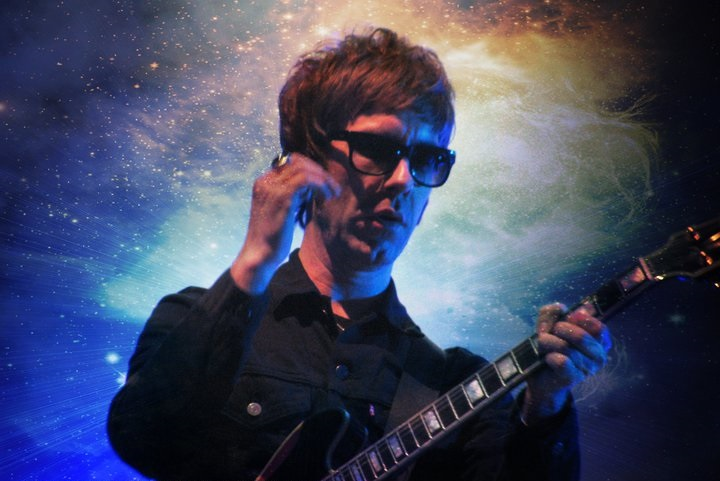
- Mehler performing in 2011

Background information
- Born: Jason Mehler; September 9, 1971 (age 55); Philadelphia, Pennsylvania, U.S.
- Genres: Alternative rock, indie rock, psychedelic rock, space rock
- Occupation: Musician
- Instruments: Guitar, bass
- Years active: 2006–present
- Formerly of: Beady Eye

Jason "Jay" Mehler (born September 8, 1971) is an American musician. He was touring lead guitar player for British rock band Kasabian from 2006 to 2013, when he quit to become a full time member of Beady Eye, until their disbanding in late 2014. Mehler has continued as a session and touring musician for Liam Gallagher since 2017.

== Career ==
=== Kasabian ===
During the recording of Kasabian's second album, Empire (2006), Christopher Karloff, one of the band's guitarists and songwriters, left the band due to "creative and artistic differences". Jay Mehler was his replacement.

He was a permanent touring member of Kasabian, although he was not involved with most of the promotional work that the band did. While he is not credited on Empire, Jay plays on the b-sides to the singles released off the album and also features in the video for the song "Empire".

=== Beady Eye ===
On March 7, 2013, it was announced that Jay was leaving Kasabian and had joined Beady Eye on bass guitar. Mehler stayed with the band until their disbandment in October 2014.

== Equipment ==
Mehler uses Gretsch guitars live accompanied by Vox amplifiers, notably the AC30CC2X. He also has been seen using Marshall Bluesbreakers. He uses a Blackstar HT-Dual pedal to create his tone, with him saying the pedal is the "base of his live sound". He has also been seen using a Univibe pedal, a Boss TR-2 Tremolo, a Boss tuner and the Small Clone and Small Stone from Electro Harmonix.
