= Be (Beady Eye album) =

2013 studio album by Beady Eye

Studio album by Beady Eye
- Released: 10 June 2013
- Recorded: November 2012 – March 2013
- Studio: State of the Ark, Richmond, London
- Genre: Rock; psychedelic rock; garage rock
- Length: 49:09
- Label: Beady Eye; Columbia
- Producer: Dave Sitek; Beady Eye

Beady Eye chronology
Different Gear, Still Speeding (2011)	Be (2013)

Singles from Be
- 1. "Second Bite of the Apple" Released: 29 April 2013; 2. "Shine a Light / The World's Not Set in Stone" Released: 19 August 2013; 3. "Iz Rite / Soul Love" Released: 25 November 2013

Be (stylised as BE) is the second and final studio album by English rock band Beady Eye, released on 10 June 2013. It was recorded between November 2012 and March 2013 and produced by Dave Sitek. The album debuted at number two on the UK Albums Chart, behind Black Sabbath's 13. Contemporary reviews were mixed, often focusing on Sitek's production and the band's shift toward more overtly psychedelic textures compared to their debut.

== Background and recording ==
After releasing Different Gear, Still Speeding (2011), Beady Eye recruited producer Dave Sitek, known for work with TV on the Radio and the Yeah Yeah Yeahs, for their second album. Recording took place between November 2012 and March 2013 at State of the Ark in Richmond, London.

Gallagher later said he had wanted the album to be titled Universal Gleam, but was outvoted by the rest of the band and label. The phrase was later used for the title of a track on Gallagher's debut solo album As You Were.

== Composition and lyrics ==
Reviewers frequently characterised BE as a rock album with prominent psychedelic colouring, and as a deliberate departure from the comparatively straight-ahead approach of Beady Eye's debut. The Guardian highlighted motorik and Velvet Underground-like impulses in the rhythm section and arrangements, while noting brass and disorienting guitar textures across the record. Pitchfork argued that Sitek's cleaner, more detailed production emphasised the band's songwriting strengths and weaknesses more starkly than on earlier work. Paste described the record as darker and more brooding overall, while also pointing to moments of warmth and uplift in the sequencing.

== Release and promotion ==
The first track released from the album was "Flick of the Finger", premiered via the band's official website alongside a music video. Although it charted in the UK, it was not billed as the lead single.

The first official single was "Second Bite of the Apple". The song was originally scheduled for first UK radio play on Zane Lowe's BBC Radio 1 programme on 15 April 2013 before being rescheduled to 29 April. It was later performed on The Voice UK during the semi-final broadcast on 15 June 2013.

The double A-side "Shine a Light" / "The World's Not Set in Stone" was released on 19 August 2013, followed by the double A-side "Iz Rite" / "Soul Love" on 25 November 2013.

The band used an internet-based promotional campaign in which users could unlock stems for "Flick of the Finger" by sharing the group's website. The album leaked online roughly two weeks before release. BE was issued in standard and deluxe editions, with deluxe and Japanese editions featuring additional tracks.

== Artwork ==
The album (and subsequent single) artwork was designed by Trevor Jackson and features photographs by Harry Peccinotti, originally shot for NOVA magazine. The cover was reportedly banned in several outlets due to visible nudity; Gallagher criticised the ban in interviews. Later physical copies used a sticker to obscure the image, and some digital versions cropped it.

== Critical reception ==
Professional ratings
Aggregate scores
Source	Rating
Metacritic	59/100
Review scores
Source	Rating
AllMusic	4/5 stars
Clash	8/10
The Guardian	3/5 stars
The Independent	3/5 stars
NME	7/10
Pitchfork	5.8/10
Paste	
Sputnikmusic	1.5/5
Uncut	7/10

BE received a mixed critical reception. Several reviewers praised the band for attempting to broaden their sound through Sitek's production choices, while detractors criticised the lyrics and the coherence of the experimentation.

Some later fan discussion has treated the album as a stronger statement than the group's debut, particularly for its more adventurous production approach.

== Track listing ==
All tracks produced by Dave Sitek and Beady Eye.

Standard edition
No.	Title	Writer(s)	Length	Critical commentary (examples)
1	Flick of the Finger	Gem Archer; Andy Bell; Liam Gallagher	3:46	Reviews highlighted its aggressive tone and prominent rhythmic drive.
2	"Soul Love"	Gallagher	5:10	Noted for its spaced-out, psychedelic ambience; The Guardian and Clash singled out the track's atmosphere, while The Quietus felt it moved in a "late Beatles/Lennon" direction.
3	"Face the Crowd"	Bell	4:00	
4	Second Bite of the Apple	Archer	3:28	Often treated as a key single and one of the album’s clearest attempts at a more contemporary groove-based sound.
5	"Soon Come Tomorrow"	Bell	4:58	Mentioned by some reviewers as a pop-leaning highlight.
6	"Iz Rite"	Archer	3:26	Paste described it as one of the record’s more straightforward moments before the closing run turns more reflective.
7	"I'm Just Saying"	Bell	3:45	The Guardian and The Independent cited it as an energetic, hook-forward moment amid the album’s heavier textures.
8	"Don't Brother Me"	Gallagher	7:30	Described as a lengthy centrepiece; reviewers pointed to its slow-building structure and atmosphere, and interpreted its lyrics as a conciliatory message to Gallagher's brother, Noel Gallagher.
9	"Shine a Light"	Gallagher	5:04	The Independent compared its melodic feel to late-period Oasis balladry, contrasting it with the album’s more experimental tracks.
10	"Ballroom Figured"	Archer	3:31	The Guardian called out the track when describing the album’s brass-driven and groove-oriented detours.
11	"Start Anew"	Gallagher	4:29	Several reviews treated the closer as a reflective finale, with Paste specifically highlighting its consoling tone.

Bonus tracks

Additional tracks on double LP release
No.	Title	Writer(s)	Length
12.	"Dreaming of Some Space"	Bell	1:56
13.	"The World's Not Set in Stone"	Gallagher	4:46
14.	"Back After the Break"	Archer	4:09

Deluxe edition bonus track
No.	Title	Writer(s)	Length
15.	"Off at the Next Exit"	Archer	3:36

Additional tracks on Japanese edition
No.	Title	Writer(s)	Length
16.	"Girls in Uniform"	Bell	6:23
17.	"Evil Eye"	Gallagher	5:01

== Personnel ==
Beady Eye

- Liam Gallagher – lead vocals, tambourine, additional rhythm guitar
- Gem Archer – guitar, keyboards, backing vocals
- Andy Bell – guitar, keyboards, backing vocals
- Chris Sharrock – drums, percussion
- Jeff Wootton – bass guitar

Production

- Dave Sitek – production

== Charts ==
=== Weekly charts ===
Chart (2013)	Peak position
Australian Albums (ARIA)	81
Austrian Albums (Ö3 Austria)	26
Belgian Albums (Ultratop Flanders)	23
Belgian Albums (Ultratop Wallonia)	40
Dutch Albums (Album Top 100)	37
Finnish Albums (Suomen virallinen lista)	37
French Albums (SNEP)	101
German Albums (Offizielle Top 100)	29
Irish Albums (IRMA)	4
Italian Albums (FIMI)	11
Japanese Albums (Oricon)	10
Scottish Albums (OCC)	1
Spanish Albums (Promusicae)	28
Swedish Albums (Sverigetopplistan)	36
Swiss Albums (Schweizer Hitparade)	17
UK Albums (OCC)	2

=== Year-end charts ===
Chart (2013)	Position
UK Albums (OCC)	145

== Certifications ==
Region	Certification	Certified units/sales
United Kingdom (BPI)	Silver	78,000
