= Bring the Light (Beady Eye song) =

Single by Beady Eye

from the album Different Gear, Still Speeding
- B-side: "Sons of the Stage"
- Released: 22 November 2010
- Recorded: 2010
- Studio: RAK, London
- Genre: Rock and roll
- Length: 3:43
- Label: Beady Eye
- Songwriters: Gem Archer, Andy Bell, Liam Gallagher
- Producers: Beady Eye, Steve Lillywhite

Beady Eye singles chronology
"Bring the Light" (2010)	"Four Letter Word" (2011)

"Bring the Light" is the debut single by English rock band Beady Eye, released on Beady Eye Records as "EYE1". The song, written for the band's debut album Different Gear, Still Speeding was released on 10 November 2010, as a free download, and was also available as a limited release single on 7" vinyl. The B-side to the single is a cover of the World of Twist song "Sons of the Stage".

== 7" track listing ==
1. "Bring the Light" (Liam Gallagher) – 3:37
2. "Sons of the Stage" (Gordon King, Tony Ogden) – 4:46 (World of Twist cover)

== Music video ==
The music video was released online on 16 November 2010. It was directed by Charlie Lightening and shows the band, including live members Jeff Wootton and Matt Jones, playing on a heavily backlit stage, while dancers perform beside them.

== Reception ==
The song has received positive reviews. NME have called the song "Oasis without Noel", commenting that it's reminder that Liam is a good songwriter in his own right, and Gigwise have simply called the song a different route from the trademark Oasis sound, also commenting that whether Noel Gallagher is missed as a songwriter will be seen on the album, while Stereoboard have commented that the song "sounds like album filler from the later Oasis days", rating it 5/10. However, on reviewing the album, NME called the song a surprising highlight, and an example of a song that would have been impossible in Oasis.

== Chart performance ==
Chart (2010)	Peak position
Belgium (Ultratip Bubbling Under Flanders)	32
UK Singles (OCC)	61
UK Indie (OCC)	5
UK Indie Breakers (OCC)	1
