= Four Letter Word (Beady Eye song) =

Single by Beady Eye

from the album Different Gear, Still Speeding
- B-side: "World Outside My Room"
- Released: 17 January 2011
- Genre: Alternative rock, neo-psychedelia
- Length: 4:22
- Label: Beady Eye
- Songwriters: Liam Gallagher, Gem Archer, Andy Bell
- Producers: Beady Eye, Steve Lillywhite

Beady Eye singles chronology
"Bring the Light" (2010)	"Four Letter Word" (2011)	"The Roller" (2011)

"Four Letter Word" is a single by English band Beady Eye, released on Beady Eye Records as "BEADY3". The track is also featured on their 2011 debut album Different Gear, Still Speeding as the opening track. The video for the song was premièred exclusively for NME and also on the band's official website on 26 December 2010, at the same time a limited edition 7" vinyl was released on 17 January 2011 on 7" vinyl backed with new track "World Outside My Room".

== Track listing ==
All songs written by Liam Gallagher, Gem Archer, and Andy Bell.

1. "Four Letter Word" – 4:15
2. "World Outside My Room" – 4:25

== Music video ==
The music video for the song, directed by Julian House and Julian Gibbs, was released exclusively on the NME website on 26 December 2010, and features the band, and live members Jeff Wootton and Matt Jones, playing to an audience in an undisclosed location in London with psychedelic imagery interspersed throughout. The release of the music video was also the first release of the song.

== Reception ==
"Four Letter Word" has so far been given even higher praise than the band's previous single, "Bring the Light".

== Chart performance ==
Chart (2011)	Peak position
UK Singles (OCC)	114
UK Indie (Official Charts)	13
UK Indie Breakers (OCC)	2
