= Different Gear, Still Speeding =

Studio album by Beady Eye
- Released: 23 February 2011
- Recorded: June–November 2010
- Studios: RAK, London
- Genre: Britpop
- Length: 51:34
- Label: Beady Eye
- Producers: Beady Eye; Steve Lillywhite

Beady Eye chronology
Different Gear, Still Speeding (2011)	Be (2013)

Singles from Different Gear, Still Speeding
- 1. "Bring the Light" Released: 22 November 2010; 2. "Four Letter Word" Released: 17 January 2011; 3. "The Roller" Released: 21 February 2011; 4. "Millionaire" Released: 2 May 2011; 5. "The Beat Goes On" Released: 11 July 2011

Different Gear, Still Speeding is the debut studio album by the English rock band Beady Eye, initially released in Japan on 23 February 2011, and released in the UK on 28 February 2011. It debuted at number three in the UK Albums Chart selling 66,817 in the first week. As of August 2012, the album has sold 174,487 copies in the UK. On Different Gear, Still Speeding, all members contributed to the instrumentation, much like the later albums of Oasis.

== Critical reception ==
Professional ratings
Aggregate scores
Source	Rating
Metacritic	65/100
Review scores
Source	Rating
AllMusic	3.5/5 stars
American Songwriter	3.5/5 stars
Clash	7/10
The Fly	2/5 stars
Los Angeles Times	3/4 stars
NME	7/10
PopMatters	7/10
Q	4/5 stars
Spin	7/10
Uncut	6/10

Reviews of the album have been generally mixed-to-favourable. According to review aggregator site Metacritic, the album has an average score of 65%.

Reviewing for Rolling Stone, Stacey Anderson, who gave the album 2.5 out of 5 stars, said "On Different Gear, the band attempts stripped down, Stones-y rock but ends up with 'Be Here Now'-style guitar bluster and Liam's blithely boilerplate lyrics". Drowned in Sound awarded the album 4/10 saying that "By and large it radiates the stolid competence of a band on auto-pilot, with a few flashes of likeable enthusiasm." The Independent on Sunday gave it 2/5 stars. Simon Goddard, reviewing for Q, gave the album four-out-of-five stars and described it as "the strongest record Liam's made" since (What's the Story) Morning Glory?, while Garry Mulholland, in his three-star review for Uncut, denied that the album "remotely matches" Definitely Maybe, but felt the album was a step in the right direction. Mojo also gave the album four stars out of five, citing Gallagher's singing as a highlight. The Fly, however, remarked that the album was "dull", and a disappointment, while Scotland on Sunday added that Noel Gallagher is missed as a songwriting partner. The BBC and The Independent both commented that the album bests Oasis' later music, if not lacking innovation from the previous group, while The Sun praised the album's simplicity and variety, citing "Bring the Light" as a surprising highlight, a comment that NME repeated. The album is generally agreed to have surpassed expectations, with Mojo remarking that the album "shaped up better than many imagined," and Q saying that it "decimates all negative preconceptions."

As of January 2012 UK sales stand at 165,864 copies according to The Guardian.

== Track listing ==
All tracks are written by Gem Archer, Andy Bell, and Liam Gallagher.

No.	Title	Length
1.	"Four Letter Word"	4:17
2.	"Millionaire"	3:19
3.	"The Roller"	3:34
4.	"Beatles and Stones"	2:56
5.	"Wind Up Dream"	3:27
6.	"Bring the Light"	3:39
7.	"For Anyone"	2:15
8.	"Kill for a Dream"	4:39
9.	"Standing on the Edge of the Noise"	2:52
10.	"Wigwam"	6:39
11.	"Three Ring Circus"	3:09
12.	"The Beat Goes On"	4:45
13.	"The Morning Son"	6:03

=== iTunes Bonus Tracks ===
No.	Title	Writer(s)	Length
14.	"Man of Misery"	Liam Gallagher	2:38
15.	"Sons of the Stage"	Gordon King, Tony Ogden	4:38

=== Japanese Edition ===
No.	Title	Writer(s)	Length
14.	"Sons of the Stage"	Gordon King, Tony Ogden	4:38
15.	"World Outside My Room"	L. Gallagher, G. Archer, A. Bell	4:20

Special edition
There is a special edition of the album, which includes a DVD with music videos for "Bring the Light", "Four Letter Word" and "Sons of the Stage" (a cover of a song by Oasis favourites World of Twist), as well as a documentary entitled RAK Them Out. Japanese copies included the music video for "The Roller". A Japan-only "Limited Tour Edition" includes a bonus DVD featuring highlights from the concert in Paris on 13 March 2011, containing twelve songs in 52 minutes, and music videos including "The Beat Goes On".

No.	Title	Length
1.	""RAK Them Out – Documental""
2.	""Bring The Light – Video""	3:41
3.	""Four Letter Word – Video""	4:22
4.	""Sons of the Stage – Video""	4:46

== Personnel ==
Personnel per booklet.

Beady Eye

- Liam Gallagher – vocals
- Gem Archer – guitars, bass, keyboards, backing vocals
- Andy Bell – guitars, bass, keyboards, backing vocals
- Chris Sharrock – drums

Additional musicians

- Victoria Akintola, Nomvula Malinga – backing vocals on "Bring the Light" and "Kill for a Dream"

Production

- Beady Eye, Steve Lillywhite – producers
- Beady Eye, Jonathan Shakhovskoy – mixing
- Jonathan Shakhovskoy – engineer
- Helen Atkinson – recording assistance
- Rich Cooper – mixing assistance
- John Davis – mastering
- Steve Gullick – photography
- Lawrence Watson – photography
- Paul 'Spooner' Heywood – photography
- Paul Heywood – photography
- House@Intro – album art

== Charts ==
=== Weekly charts ===
Chart (2011)	Peak position
Australian Albums (ARIA)	18
Austrian Albums (Ö3 Austria)	14
Belgian Albums (Ultratop Flanders)	14
Belgian Albums (Ultratop Wallonia)	20
Canadian Albums (Billboard)	20
Danish Albums (Hitlisten)	27
Dutch Albums (Album Top 100)	7
Finnish Albums (Suomen virallinen lista)	20
French Albums (SNEP)	32
German Albums (Offizielle Top 100)	15
Irish Albums (IRMA)	3
Italian Albums (FIMI)	10
Japanese Albums (Oricon)	5
New Zealand Albums (RMNZ)	35
Norwegian Albums (VG-lista)	30
Scottish Albums (Official Charts)	2
South Korean Albums (Gaon)	12
Spanish Albums (Promusicae)	13
Swedish Albums (Sverigetopplistan)	21
Swiss Albums (Schweizer Hitparade)	7
UK Albums (Official Charts)	3
UK Independent Albums (Official Charts)	2
US Billboard 200	31
US Top Alternative Albums (Billboard)	4
US Independent Albums (Billboard)	6
US Indie Store Album Sales (Billboard)	11
US Top Rock Albums (Billboard)	7

=== Year-end charts ===
Chart (2011)	Position
UK Albums (OCC)	69

== Certifications ==
Region	Certification	Certified units/sales
United Kingdom (BPI)	Gold	191,000

== Release history ==
Region	Date	Label
Japan	23 February 2011	Sony Music
Germany	25 February 2011	Beady Eye Records
Republic of Ireland	25 February 2011	Beady Eye Records
United Kingdom	25 February 2011	Beady Eye Records
Italy	28 February 2011	Beady Eye Records
Spain	28 February 2011	Beady Eye Records
United States/Canada	1 March 2011	Dangerbird Records
Australia	11 March 2011	Liberation Music
Argentina	18 March 2011	Sony Music
Brazil	18 March 2011	Sony Music
Croatia	21 March 2011	Sony Music / Menart
