= Beady Eye =

English rock band (2009–2014)

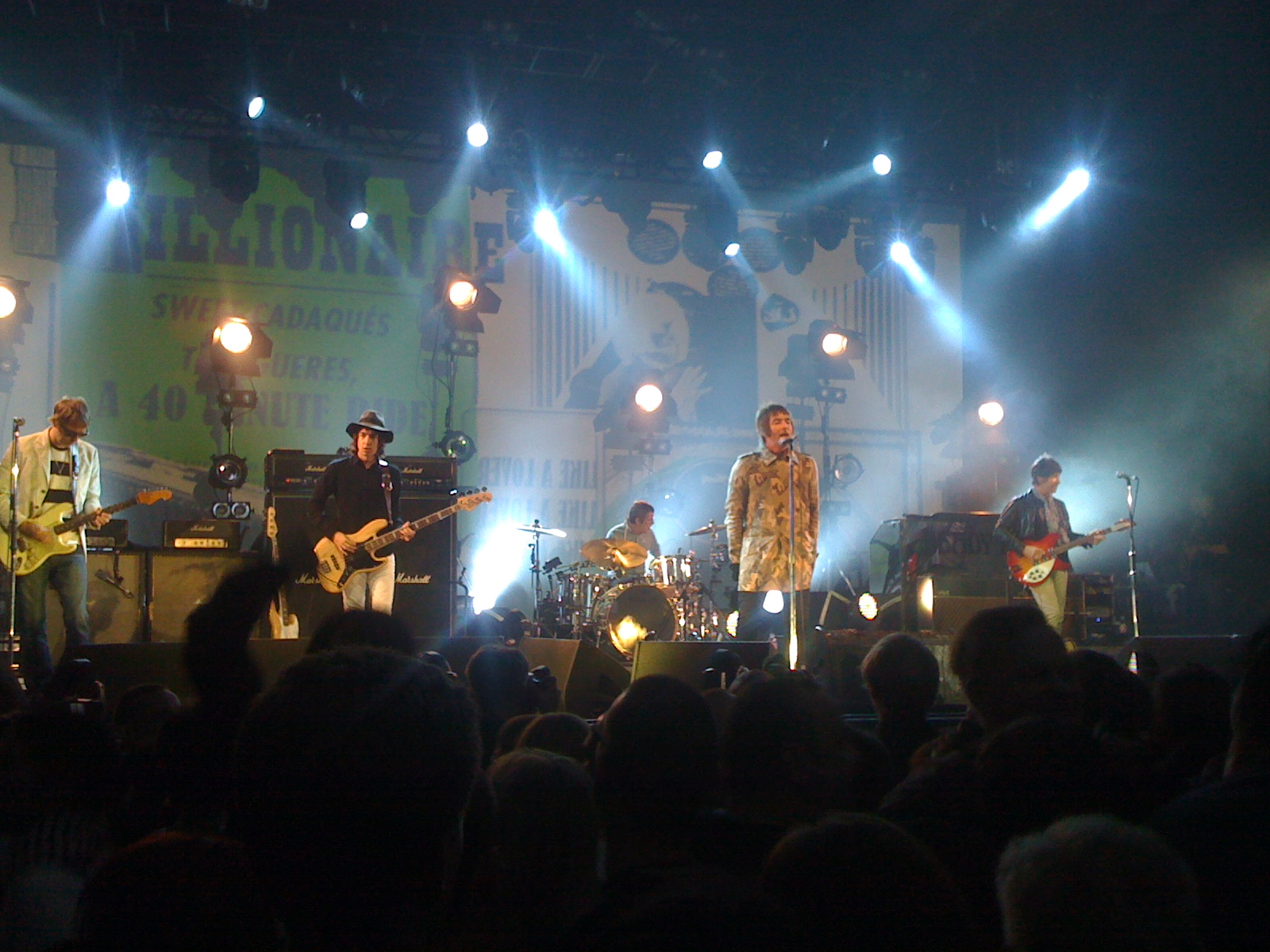
- Beady Eye performing in October 2011. From left to right: Andy Bell, Jeff Wootton, Chris Sharrock (on drums), Liam Gallagher and Gem Archer.

Background information
- Origin: London, England
- Genres: Rock; alternative rock; Post-Britpop
- Years active: 2009–2014
- Labels: Beady Eye; Sony; Dangerbird; MapleMusic
- Spinoff of: Oasis
- Past members: Liam Gallagher; Gem Archer; Andy Bell; Chris Sharrock; Jeff Wootton; Jay Mehler

Beady Eye were an English rock band formed in London in 2009 by former Oasis members Liam Gallagher (vocals), Gem Archer (guitar) and Andy Bell (guitar), and former Oasis touring musician Chris Sharrock (drums). The band was created when Oasis' lead guitarist and primary songwriter Noel Gallagher quit in August 2009, after which the remaining members decided to rename themselves and continue making music. Jeff Wootton joined as bassist in 2010, but departed in 2013; former Kasabian guitarist Jay Mehler replaced him.

Beady Eye released two studio albums—Different Gear, Still Speeding (2011) and BE (2013). Both albums reached the top 5 on the UK Albums Chart; however, the band had only one UK top 40 single with "The Roller", which peaked at No. 31. Beady Eye received some praise from Oasis fans, with Q claiming that their debut album was the best Liam had performed on since Oasis' (What's the Story) Morning Glory?. Liam Gallagher announced in October 2014 that Beady Eye had disbanded.

== History ==
=== Formation and first singles: 2009–2010 ===
After Oasis abruptly split in August 2009, Liam Gallagher announced in November he and former Oasis band members had written new material as part of a new project, and could be gigging as early as a couple of months, and stated that "Oasis are done; this is something new". On 19 November 2009, Liam Gallagher announced that he would be recording an album with Gem Archer, Andy Bell, Chris Sharrock around Christmas time, with a possible release date in July 2010.

He told MTV: "We've been demo-ing some songs that we've had for a bit. Just doing that, on the quiet, not making a big fuss about it. After Christmas we might go in the studio and record them and hopefully have an album out in July." He later said that the band would "do it in a different kind of way now. I'll try and reconnect with a new band, new songs, and I'm feeling confident about the songs." He was reported to be "feeling a million per cent confident that they could be better than Oasis."

On 16 March 2010, Liam announced that his new band would be releasing their first single in October with an album to follow the next year. On 9 November 2010, Beady Eye released their first single "Bring the Light" as a free download.

The band released "Bring the Light" as a promotional single on 15 November 2010, as a free download. A limited physical release followed, and charted at number 61 on the UK Singles Chart, topping the Indie and Rock charts. A second promotional single, "Four Letter Word", was released on 26 December 2010.

=== Different Gear, Still Speeding: 2010–2012 ===
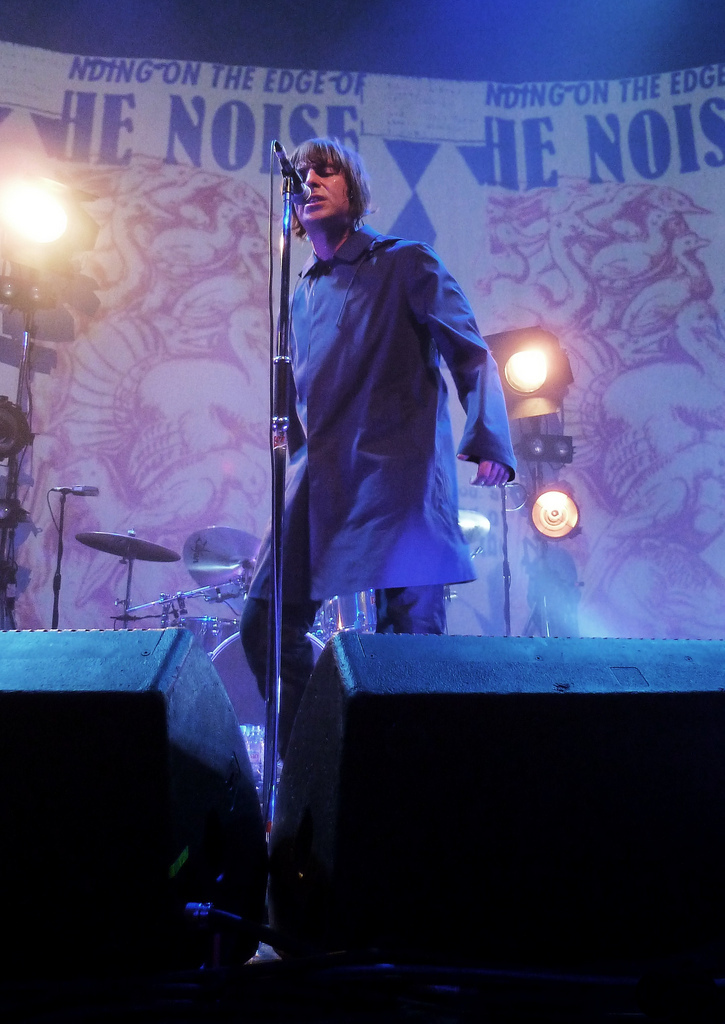
Gallagher with Beady Eye in 2011

"The Roller" was announced as the band's first commercial single. It preceded Different Gear, Still Speeding, which was released on 28 February 2011. The album was recorded in London at RAK studios in Autumn 2010 and produced by Steve Lillywhite. The band then undertook a short promotional tour of the UK and Europe in March 2011. A second single, "Millionaire", was announced for 2 May. Following a performance at Brixton Academy, they released a cover of "Across the Universe", originally by The Beatles, as a download only single, with proceeds going to the British Red Cross Japan Tsunami Appeal.

The third single from their debut album, "The Beat Goes On", was released on 18 July 2011 with a new B side, "In the Bubble with a Bullet".

In July 2011, Beady Eye recorded the song "Blue Moon", which is sung by Manchester City fans during matches, in support of Manchester City's new 2011/12 kit. Gallagher said "I've been a City fan since I was a kid, so to be involved with the launch of a new kit is colossal. Manchester City fans are known for having a lot of style and the new shirt looks mega. I love the soundwave idea and the Mod-inspired collar looks proper smart. "Blue Moon" is a top tune and has been City's song for as long as I can remember. It's been covered by loads of people but the only good one until now was the one Elvis did. I hope the fans buzz off our version and sing along to it at the stadium".

Beady Eye toured UK, Europe and America from March to December 2011.. The band initially shied away from playing Oasis songs, because Liam Gallagher wanted the band to "become known for what it is".

=== BE and break-up: 2012–2014 ===
In February, Liam stated that Beady Eye would play Oasis songs. On 28 June 2012, Beady Eye played at Warrington's Parr Hall in which they played two Oasis songs: "Morning Glory" and "Rock 'n' Roll Star". During the same gig, they also showcased a new song entitled "The World's Not Set in Stone". On 12 August 2012, Beady Eye performed Oasis classic "Wonderwall" at the London 2012 Olympics closing ceremony. After continued writing and sporadic recording in 2012, in November the band started recording the follow-up to Different Gear, Still Speeding with musician and producer Dave Sitek.

"Flick of the Finger", the first song from the band's new album debuted on Californian radio station KCRW on 5 April. In March 2013, Wootton left the band to focus on his solo career and was replaced by Kasabian guitarist Jay Mehler. On 10 April 2013, Liam Gallagher announced that Beady Eye's second album would be released on 10 June 2013 and would be titled BE. The album was produced by Dave Sitek who has previously produced records for Yeah Yeah Yeahs, TV on the Radio and Jane's Addiction. The first single "Second Bite of the Apple" was released in May. The album charted at Number 2 in the UK on its release. The double A-side "Shine a Light" / "The World's Not Set in Stone" was released on 19 August.

Beady Eye opened the Glastonbury Festival 2013 with an unbilled performance on the Other Stage on Friday 28 June, despite Liam previously claiming he would never return to the festival. Their August tour with dates including V Festival was cut short, due to a head injury sustained by guitarist Gem Archer at his home.

On 18 October 2013, Beady Eye played at A Night For Jon Brookes, a tribute concert for Charlatans' former drummer, the late Jon Brookes. Former Oasis guitarist Paul "Bonehead" Arthurs joined the band in place of Archer, who reportedly was in the audience. Included in Beady Eye's set were covers of George Harrison's "My Sweet Lord" and Oasis' "Live Forever" and "Columbia." Their new double A-side "Iz Rite" / "Soul Love" was released on 25 November 2013. The band were set to play at Coachella Festival 2014 before canceling their appearance. The band toured with the Australian Big Day Out festival in January 2014.

On 25 October 2014, Liam Gallagher announced that Beady Eye had disbanded. His post on Twitter stated the band are "no longer" and thanked fans for their support. He would later embark upon a solo career with Mehler as his session and touring musician, while Archer and Sharrock joined Noel's band, High Flying Birds, and Bell returned to his original band, Ride.

In a 2018 interview, Liam blamed a lack of coverage for Beady Eye's disbandment, as well as the diminishing size of crowds and the second album's failure to gain popularity in the United States, resulting in the band not touring there. He stated that if their third album had not been successful they would have been "playing pubs".

== Beady Eye Records ==
Beady Eye Records Ltd. was a record label set up by the band to release their material in the UK and Ireland, serving the same purpose as Big Brother Recordings did for Oasis. On 24 January 2011, it was announced that American indie label Dangerbird Records would release Different Gear, Still Speeding in North America on 1 March 2011.

== Band members ==
=== Final lineup ===
- Liam Gallagher – lead vocals, percussion (2009–2014)
- Gem Archer – guitars, keyboards, bass, percussion, backing vocals (2009–2014)
- Andy Bell – guitars, bass, keyboards, backing vocals (2009–2014)
- Chris Sharrock – drums, percussion (2009–2014)

Live and session musicians

- Matt Jones – keyboards, percussion 2010–2014)
- Jeff Wootton – bass (2011–2013)
- Jay Mehler – bass (2013–2014)
- Paul "Bonehead" Arthurs – guitars (2013, 2014)
- Jay Sharrock - drums (2013)

== Discography ==
- Different Gear, Still Speeding (2011)
- BE (2013)

== Awards ==
=== NME Awards ===
Beady Eye received one NME Award nomination in 2011.

Year	Nominee / work	Award	Result
2011	Beady Eye	Best New Band	Nominated

Beady Eye's debut album Different Gear, Still Speeding was shortlisted for XFM's New Music Award to find the best debut album from a British band in 2011. Their debut single "The Roller" was announced as the best selling vinyl single of 2011 in the UK. The follow-up release "Millionaire" was the second best selling, and "The Beat Goes On" was fifth. The documentary Start Anew? A Film About Liam Gallagher and Beady Eye won the People's Choice Lovie Award, while "Shine A Light" was nominated for Q Awards' Best Video.
