= Liam Gallagher =

English singer-songwriter (born 1972)

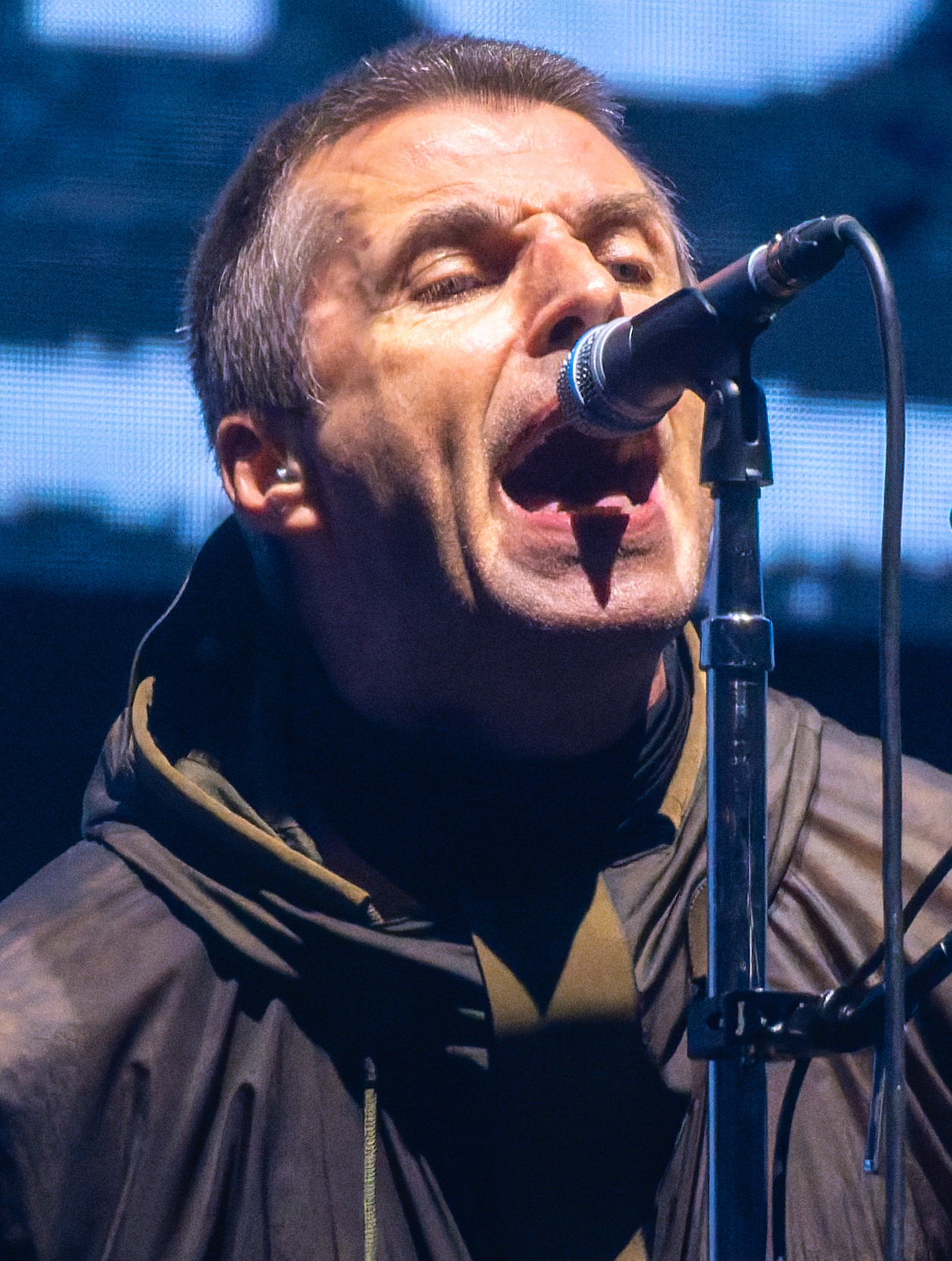
- Gallagher performing with Oasis in July 2025
- Born: William John Paul Gallagher; 21 September 1972 (age 54); Manchester, England
- Occupations: Singer; songwriter
- Years active: 1991–present
- Spouses: Patsy Kensit (m. 1997; div. 2000) Nicole Appleton (m. 2008; div. 2014)
- Children: 4
- Relatives: Noel Gallagher (brother); Anaïs Gallagher (niece)
- Musical career
- Genres: Britpop; hard rock; alternative rock
- Instruments: Vocals; percussion; guitar
- Labels: Creation; Big Brother; Epic; Warner
- Member of: Oasis
- Formerly of: Beady Eye
- Website: liamgallagher.com

William John Paul Gallagher (born 21 September 1972) is an English singer and songwriter who is the lead singer and co-founder of the rock band Oasis. Gallagher fronted Beady Eye, an offshoot of Oasis, between 2009 and 2014, before starting a solo career in 2017. One of the most recognisable figures in British rock music, he is noted for his distinctive vocal style and outspoken personality.

Gallagher was interested in joining a band called the Rain. After mutual agreement, the band underwent a name change to Oasis, and his older brother Noel was initially approached to be their manager. Noel was subsequently extended an invitation to join the band as their lead guitarist and songwriter, which he accepted. The band's debut album, Definitely Maybe (1994), was a critical and commercial success amidst the emergence of Britpop. Their second album, (What's the Story) Morning Glory? (1995), reached the top of the album charts in many countries, and their third studio album, Be Here Now (1997), became the fastest-selling album in UK chart history. Britpop eventually declined in popularity, and Oasis failed to revive it; however, all of their subsequent albums topped the UK charts, and they continued to tour, playing gigs to 1,000,000+ people worldwide, but particularly in Europe, and South America. In August 2009, following Noel's departure from Oasis, Gallagher and the remaining band members would go on to form Beady Eye, with whom he released two studio albums before they disbanded in 2014.

In 2017, Gallagher started his solo career with the release of his debut solo album, As You Were (2017), which proved to be a critical and commercial success. It topped the UK Albums Chart and was the ninth fastest-selling debut album of the 2010s in the UK, with over 103,000 units sold in its first week. In 2018, the album was certified platinum with over 300,000 units sold in the UK. His second album, Why Me? Why Not, received mostly positive reviews and topped the UK charts upon its release in September 2019. This made it his tenth chart-topping album including eight with Oasis, and it also became the fastest-selling vinyl of 2019. In March 2010, he was voted the greatest frontman of all time in a reader poll by Q magazine. In 2019, he received the MTV Europe Music Award for "Rock Icon". Gallagher's third album, C'mon You Know, was released in 2022 and became his fourth solo album to debut at number one on the UK Albums Chart. In early 2024, Gallagher collaborated with ex-Stone Roses musician John Squire on the studio album Liam Gallagher John Squire, which was released that March and continued Gallagher's streak of debuting atop the British charts.

Oasis' time was marked by turbulence, especially during the peak of Britpop, during which Gallagher was involved in several disputes with Noel. Their conflicts and wild lifestyles regularly made tabloid headlines. The band had a rivalry with fellow Britpop band Blur.

== Early life ==
Gallagher was born in the Longsight area of Manchester on 21 September 1972 to Irish immigrant parents Peggy and Tommy Gallagher from Charlestown, County Mayo, and Duleek, County Meath, respectively. As the youngest of three children, he has two elder brothers, Paul and Noel. Shortly after his birth, the family moved to Ashburn Avenue and then Cranwell Drive in the Manchester suburb of Burnage. As the eldest child, Paul was given his own bedroom while Liam had to share his bedroom with Noel.

When he was 10, Peggy took him and his brothers and left abusive Tommy, whom she divorced four years later. Although Liam maintained sporadic contact with his father throughout his teens, their issues remain unresolved. While drinking at a pub after an Oasis show in Ireland during the height of their fame, Liam noticed his father from across the room and had to be calmed down by Noel. A leaked phone call later revealed that he subsequently called his father and threatened to break his legs if he ever saw him again.

Gallagher was educated at St. Bernard's RC Primary School and the Barlow Roman Catholic High School in Didsbury. Despite common reports that he was expelled at age 16 for fighting, he was actually suspended for three months. He then returned to school, where he completed his last term and gained four GCSEs in 1990. He preferred sports at a young age, having no interest in music. During his teens, he suffered a blow to the head with a hammer from a student at a rival school, which he credits with changing his attitude towards music. After this incident, he became infatuated with the idea of joining a band. He became confident in his ability to sing and began listening to bands like the Beatles, the Stone Roses, the La's, the Who, the Kinks, the Jam, and T. Rex. In the process, he became obsessed with the Beatles' John Lennon, and would later sarcastically claim to be Lennon reincarnated despite being born eight years prior to Lennon's death. Liam and Noel attended a Stone Roses benefit gig at International 2 in 1988; both brothers claim that if they had not gone to that gig, Oasis would never have happened. Liam later claimed: "That was my favourite gig of all time, killed me dead, changed me fuckin' life. If I hadn't gone that night, I'd probably be sitting in some pub in Levenshulme." He would also help Noel with his job as a roadie for Inspiral Carpets and worked as a tax collector for HM Revenue and Customs.

== Career ==
=== 1991–2009: Oasis ===
"Liam? We wouldn't have been what we were without him, that's for sure. As important and as vital as those songs were and still are, I think the two elements that made Oasis was his thing and them songs. If it wasn't for him we might have been just another band. I couldn't imagine anybody else being the singer."

— Noel Gallagher, interviewed in 2015

When school friend Paul "Guigsy" McGuigan invited Gallagher to join his band The Rain as a vocalist, he agreed. He was the band's co-songwriter, along with guitarist Paul "Bonehead" Arthurs. Noel has since openly mocked this writing partnership, describing them as being "just awful", and Liam also admitted that they were "shit". The band only rehearsed once a week and did not get many gigs. It was at one of their rare shows in 1991 at the Boardwalk in Manchester that Noel, having recently returned from touring internationally as a roadie for Inspiral Carpets, saw them perform. In 1993, Oasis played a four-song set at King Tut's Wah Wah Hut in Glasgow, where Alan McGee of Creation Records discovered them and signed them for a six-album deal. The band's debut album Definitely Maybe was released on 28 August 1994, and went on to become the fastest-selling British debut album of all time. Liam was praised for his vocal contributions to the album, and his presence made Oasis a popular live act. Critics cited influences from the Beatles and Sex Pistols. Liam's attitude garnered attention from the British tabloid press, which often ran stories concerning his alleged drug use and behaviour. In 1997, Definitely Maybe was named the 14th greatest album of all time in a "Music of the Millennium" poll conducted by HMV. In Channel 4's "100 Greatest Albums" countdown in 2005, the album was placed at No. 6. In 2006, NME placed the album at No. 3 in a list of the greatest British albums ever. In the 2006 book of British Hit Singles and Albums, the album was voted the best album of all time, with the Beatles' Sgt. Pepper's Lonely Hearts Club Band finishing second. Q placed it at No. 5 on their greatest albums of all-time list in 2006, and NME hailed it as the greatest album of all time that same year.

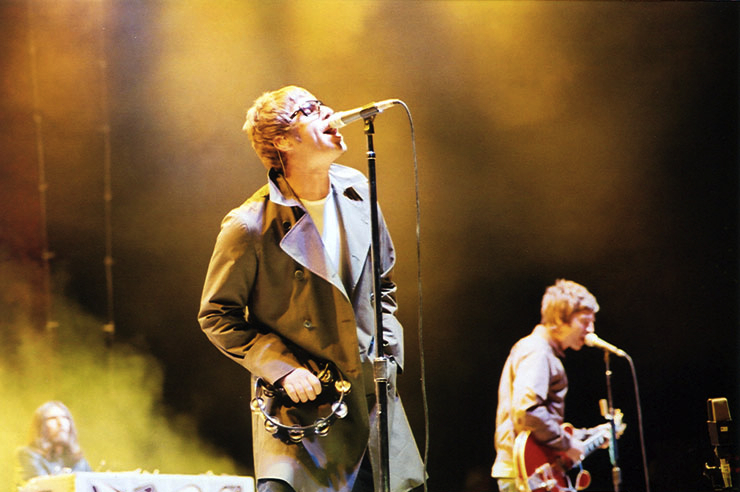
The Gallagher brothers performing with Oasis in September 2005

The band's second album (What's the Story) Morning Glory? was even more successful, becoming the third-best selling album in British history. Around this time, Oasis became embroiled in a well-documented media-fuelled feud with fellow Britpop band Blur. The differing styles of the bands now leading the Britpop movement—Oasis a working-class northern band, and Blur a middle-class southern band—made the media perceive them as natural rivals. In August 1995, Blur and Oasis released new singles on the same day; Blur's "Country House" outsold Oasis' "Roll with It" by 58,000 copies during the week. When the band mimed the single on Top of the Pops, Liam pretended to play Noel's guitar, and Noel pretended to sing, taking a jibe at the show's lip-syncing format. (What's the Story) Morning Glory? is considered to be a seminal record of the Britpop era and as one of the best albums of the 1990s, and appears in several charts as one of the greatest albums of all time. In 2010, Rolling Stone commented that "the album is a triumph, full of bluster, bravado, and surprising tenderness" and that it "capped a true golden age for Britpop". The magazine ranked the album at No. 378 on its 2012 list of the 500 Greatest Albums of All Time. The album's enduring popularity within the UK was reflected when it won the British Album of 30 Years award at the Brit Awards 2010. The award was voted on by the public to decide the greatest Best Album winner in the history of the Brit Awards. The album was also included in the book 1001 Albums You Must Hear Before You Die.

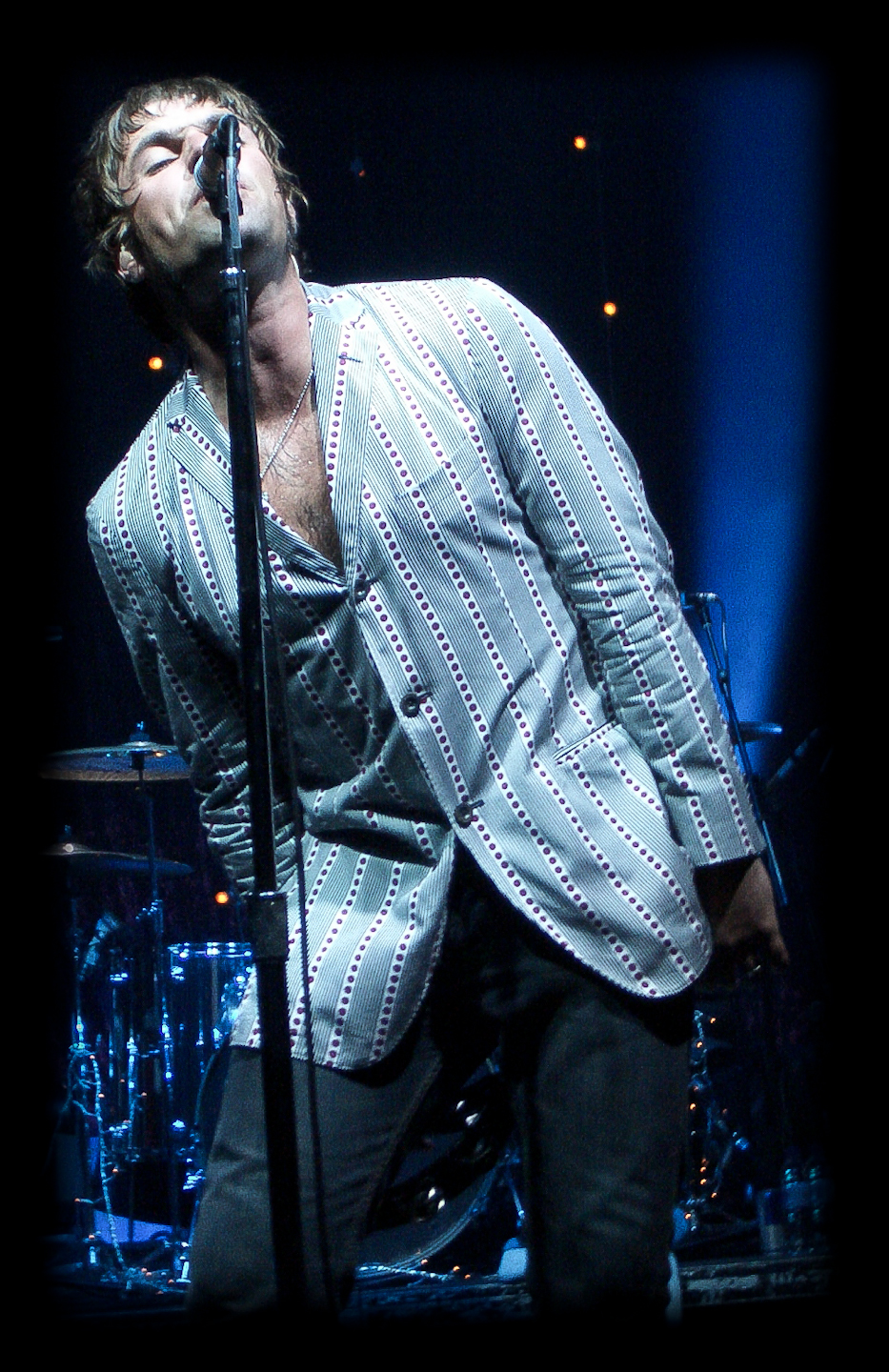
Gallagher performing in February 2006

Oasis's third album, Be Here Now, was released on 21 August 1997 and set a new record as the fastest-selling album in UK Chart history. The album was denounced by Noel in later years, but Liam has defended it. On the first day of release, Be Here Now sold over 424,000 copies and became the fastest-selling album in British chart history; initial reviews were overwhelmingly positive. The band's long-time producer Owen Morris said the recording sessions were marred by arguments and drug abuse, and that the band's only motivations were commercial. By 2008, the album had sold eight million copies worldwide. It was the best-selling album of 1997 in the UK, with 1.47 million units sold. The album topped the UK Vinyl Albums Chart in 2016, 19 years after its original release. Creation Records shut down in 1999, after which the Gallagher brothers set up their own label, Big Brother Recordings, for all future Oasis releases. Future albums and singles were marked with codes starting with "RKID" ("our kid", Northern English slang for a sibling or younger relative). Oasis returned in 2000 with the album Standing on the Shoulder of Giants. Founding members Bonehead and Guigsy left during the recording, leaving Liam as the only member remaining from the band's pre-Oasis lineup. The album featured the band's first song written by Liam, "Little James", written for his then-wife Patsy Kensit's son James. This song, along with the album as a whole, received generally mixed reviews.

Oasis's next album, Heathen Chemistry, was released in 2002 and featured three more songs written by Liam. One of them was "Songbird", an acoustic ballad about his love for Nicole Appleton, whom he would later marry. The song was the fourth single from the album and reached No. 3 in the UK charts. Later that year, Gallagher broke several teeth and sustained injuries to his face after a fight broke out at a Munich bar. He and Oasis drummer Alan White were arrested but released without charge. Oasis had to cancel the shows in Munich and Düsseldorf due to Liam's injuries. 2005 saw the release of Oasis's sixth studio album, Don't Believe the Truth, featuring a further three compositions by Liam: "Love Like a Bomb" (co-written with rhythm guitarist Gem Archer), "The Meaning of Soul", and "Guess God Thinks I'm Abel". The album won two Q Awards: a special People's Choice Award and Best Album. Gallagher joined the rest of Oasis to receive the Outstanding Contribution to Music Award at the Brit Awards 2007. As the band picked up the award, he commented on stage, "Seeing as we don't get nominated for this shit no more, this'll have to do."

2008 saw the release of the band's seventh and final album, Dig Out Your Soul, which featured three Liam-written songs: "I'm Outta Time", "Ain't Got Nothin'", and "Soldier On". Dig Out Your Soul went straight to No. 1 on the UK Album Charts and reached No. 5 in the U.S. Billboard 200 chart. In the UK, the album sold 90,000 copies on its first day of release, making it the second-fastest-selling album of 2008, behind Coldplay's Viva la Vida. It debuted on the UK Albums Chart at No. 1 with first-week sales of 200,866 copies, making it the 51st fastest selling album ever in the UK. The album debuted at No. 5 on the Billboard 200 in the U.S. with 53,000 copies sold. It is the highest chart position of any Oasis album in the U.S. since Be Here Now, which debuted at No. 2, but fewer total opening week sales than Don't Believe the Truth. It spent over 30 weeks on the French albums chart. Many critics lauded Dig Out Your Soul as one of the band's strongest albums, with one opining that "it seems Oasis have made something that can happily play alongside Morning Glory". In August 2009, during the tour in support of the album, the band split up due to Noel not being able to work with Liam any more. It is Oasis's last studio album released to date.

=== 2009–2014: Beady Eye ===
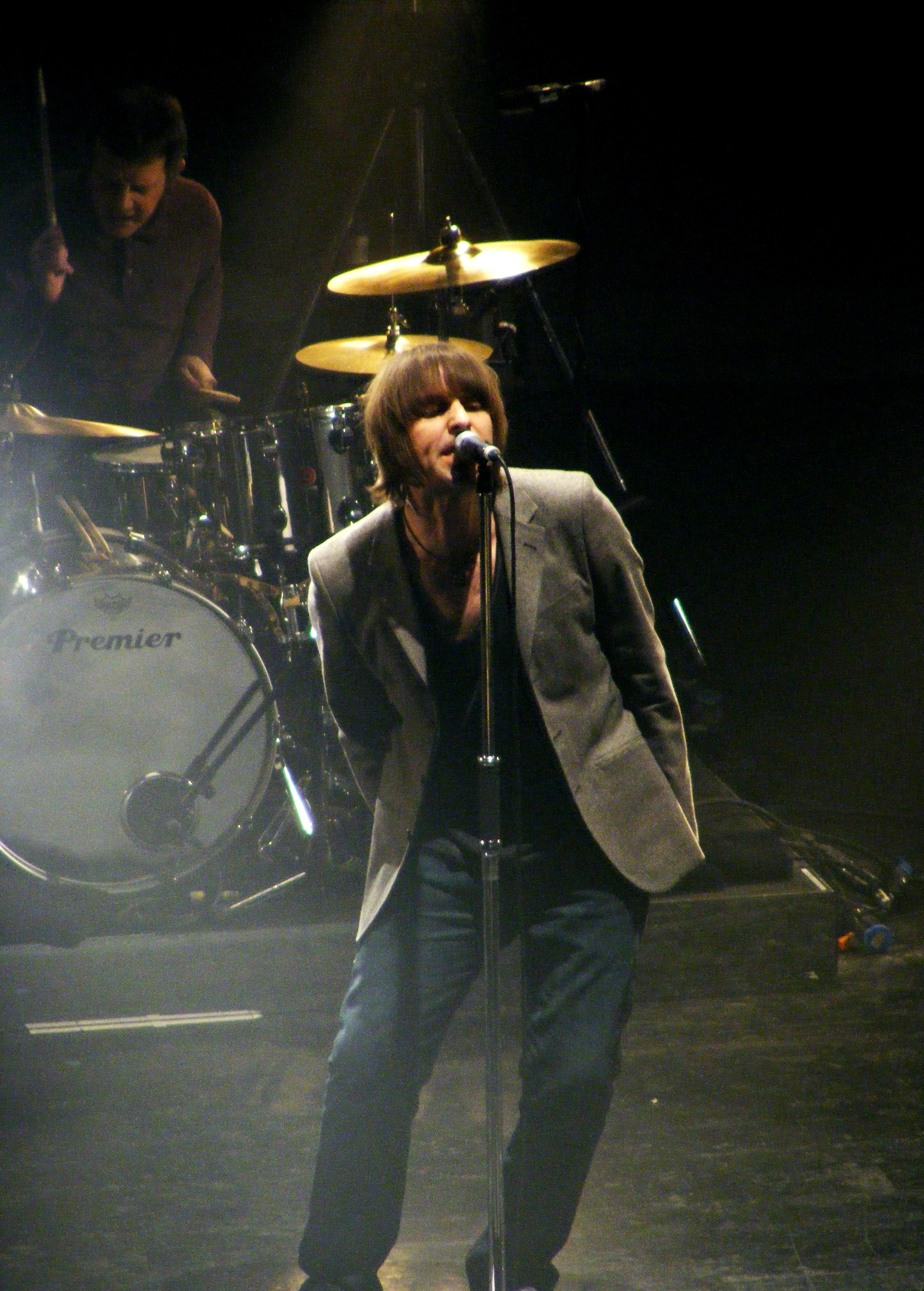
Gallagher performing with Beady Eye in March 2011

In November 2009, Gallagher announced that he and former Oasis band members had written new material as part of a new project, and could be gigging as early as a couple of months, and stated that "Oasis are done, this is something new". On 19 November 2009, he announced that he would be recording an album with Gem Archer, Andy Bell, and Chris Sharrock around Christmas time, with a possible release date in July 2010. He told MTV: "We've been demoing some songs that we've had for a bit. Just doing that, on the quiet, not making a big fuss about it. After Christmas we might go in the studio and record them and hopefully have an album out in July." He later said that the band would "do it in a different kind of way now. I'll try and reconnect with a new band, new songs, and I'm feeling confident about the songs." He was reported to have been "feeling a million percent confident that they could be better than Oasis".

In March 2010, Gallagher was voted the greatest frontman of all time in a reader poll by Q magazine. On 16 March 2010, he announced that his new band would be releasing their first single in October with an album to follow the next year. On 9 November 2010, Beady Eye released their first single "Bring the Light" as a free download. The next single from the album, "The Roller", was released in January 2011. The band's debut album Different Gear, Still Speeding was released on 28 February 2011. On the album, the songwriting is credited as a collaborative work between Gallagher, Andy Bell, and Gem Archer. The BBC and The Independent both commented that the album bests Oasis' later music, if not lacking innovation from the previous group, while NME praised the album's simplicity and variety and cited "Bring the Light" as a surprising highlight. The album is generally agreed to have surpassed expectations, with Mojo remarking that the album "shaped up better than many imagined", and Q saying that it "decimates all negative preconceptions".

On 3 April 2011, Beady Eye headlined a Japan Tsunami Disaster relief concert at the Brixton Academy. Gallagher organised the star-studded event as a fundraiser for the devastating event that happened on 11 March 2011. The event raised over £150,000 for the British Red Cross, which was working in the earthquake and tsunami-hit country. Gallagher also announced that Beady Eye's version of the Beatles' "Across the Universe", which they performed on the night, would be released as a charity single to benefit the fundraising.

In March 2012, Gallagher stated that Beady Eye would play Oasis songs. They did this for the first time when they supported the Stone Roses in June 2012. This prompted speculation as to whether an Oasis reunion was in the offing. In August 2012, Beady Eye performed "Wonderwall" at the London 2012 Olympics closing ceremony.

The band's second studio album BE was released on 12 June 2013. It was recorded with Dave Sitek between November 2012 and March 2013. The band embarked on a corresponding tour playing a "secret gig" at Glastonbury. In contrast to his headlining spot with Oasis, Beady Eye featured as one of the first bands to open the festival. Gallagher stated it was a "refreshing" change. BE was not as successful in the United States as Gallagher and the rest of the band had hoped. This hindered their American popularity, and it was announced there would be no tour dates scheduled for the United States. BE received a mixed critical reception. Many positive reviews complimented the band's progression from their debut album, while negative reviews criticised the album's lyrics and production.

Simon Harper of Clash magazine said, "Shades of light and dark ripple throughout and keep the listener guessing... (On 'Soul Love') Liam Gallagher's cosmic vibe is matched by the first distinct stamp of producer David Sitek's ambient adventuring, which commandeers the second-half of the song, letting it drift dreamily skywards. This is what permeates BE, making it sonically enchanting." On 25 October 2014, Gallagher announced that Beady Eye had disbanded. His post on Twitter stated that the band were "no longer" and thanked fans for their support.

=== 2016–2019: As You Were and Why Me? Why Not. ===
In a Twitter post on 4 January 2016, Gallagher balked at the idea of pursuing a solo career. However, in an interview with Q later that year, he announced that he would be releasing solo songs in 2017; he did not consider it a solo career, stating that he had a backlog of songs he had written over the years and wanted to release them. A solo appearance at Bergenfest in 2017 was announced in November 2016, with other festival appearances for summer 2017 later confirmed. After beginning to record his debut solo album in 2016, it was announced in March 2017 that the album was to be titled As You Were. His solo debut single "Wall of Glass" was released on 1 June, with an accompanying music video. In the same month, Gallagher performed his first solo concert at the Ritz in Manchester with all proceeds going to victims of the Manchester terror attack. He also revealed that he would launch his first solo tour of the United States and Canada to support the album's release.

On 4 June 2017, Gallagher made a surprise appearance at the One Love Manchester benefit concert, where he played "Rock 'N' Roll Star", "Wall of Glass", and "Live Forever" alongside Coldplay's Chris Martin and Jonny Buckland. He performed at the Rock am Ring festival and the Pinkpop Festival in June 2017. Since a dispute with his management in 2017, he has been represented by his Australian-born nephew Daniel Nicholas. Gallagher also performed at Glastonbury in June 2017. During the set, he sang "Don't Look Back in Anger" for the first time, dedicating his performance to the victims of the recent Manchester and London terror attacks and the Grenfell Tower fire. On 30 June 2017, he released his second solo single "Chinatown".

On 28 July 2017, Gallagher made his first-ever performance in the U.S. as a solo artist during a concert at the McKittrick Hotel in New York City.

In July, he performed at the Exit festival in Serbia and Benicassim festival in Spain and made his first-ever performance in the U.S. as a solo artist during a "secret gig" at the McKittrick Hotel in New York City. On 3 August, Gallagher performed at Lollapalooza in Chicago and left the stage in the middle of a song after performing for only 20 minutes. He later apologised on Twitter and said he had vocal problems. In August, Gallagher performed at Reading and Leeds Festival. In October, he performed the Beatles' song "Come Together" with Foo Fighters and Joe Perry at the CalJam festival in California.

On 6 October 2017, As You Were was released to positive reviews. The album proved to be a successful comeback for Gallagher, debuting at No. 1 in the UK with first-week sales of 103,000. In doing so, it outsold the rest of the top 10 of the UK Albums Chart combined, as well as achieving higher first-week sales than both Beady Eye albums combined. It also achieved the highest single-week vinyl sales in 20 years, with 16,000 copies sold. On 23 October, Gallagher announced that he would be doing a one-off concert in Finsbury Park on 29 June 2018. The gig sold out within minutes of tickets being announced. Subsequently, it was announced that there would be a concert at Emirates Lancashire Cricket Club in Manchester on 18 August 2018. It was also confirmed that Gallagher would be a headline act at the TRNSMT Festival in Glasgow Green on 30 June 2018, and that he would be a headline act at the 2018 Isle of Wight Festival alongside Depeche Mode, the Killers, and Kasabian.

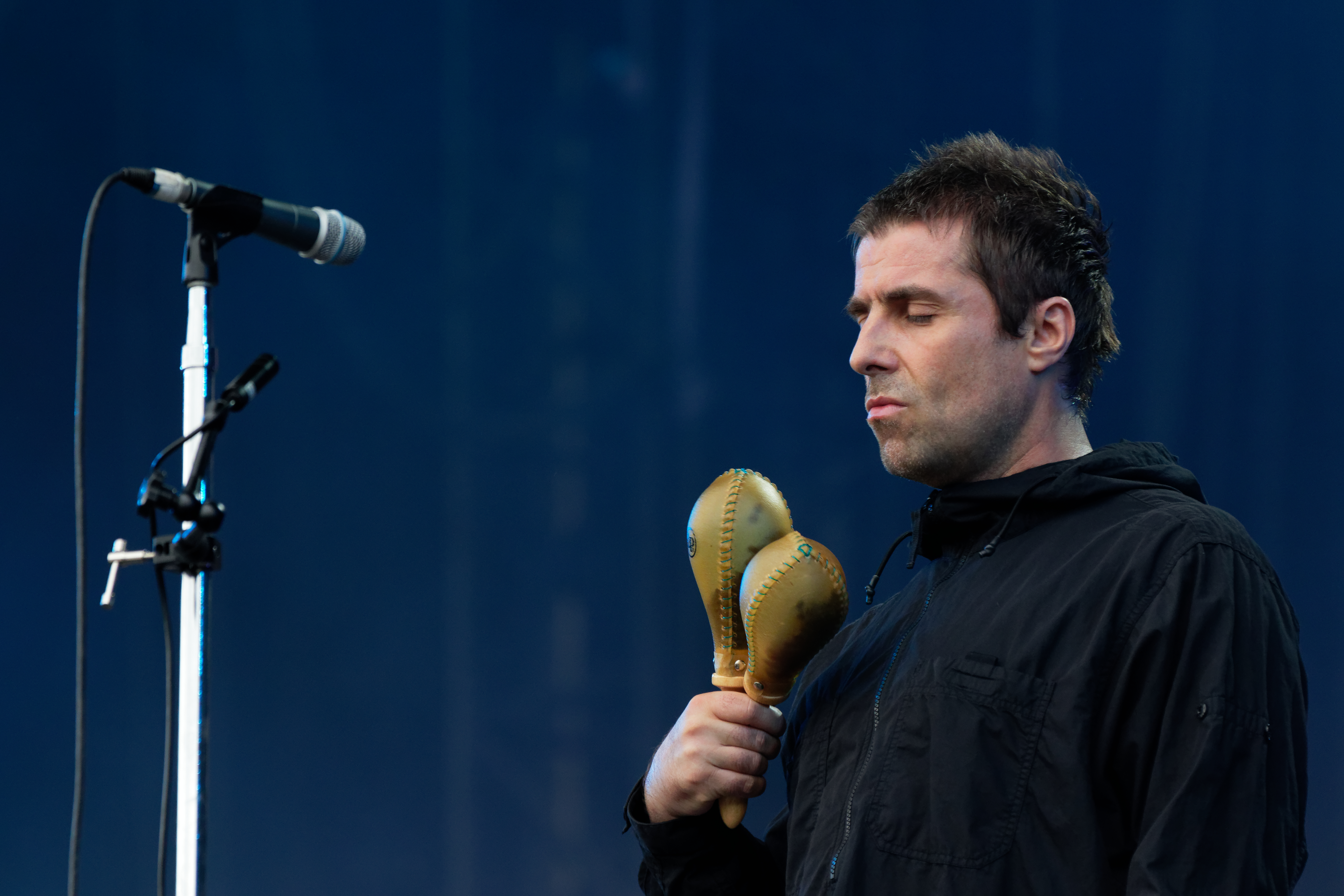
Gallagher performing at the 2018 Vieilles Charrues Festival

In February 2018, Gallagher performed "Live Forever" at the Brit Awards as a tribute to the victims of the 2017 Manchester Arena attack, after Ariana Grande (whose show was the target of the attack) could not perform due to illness. In April, it was confirmed that he would support the Rolling Stones at The London Stadium on 22 May. Later that month, he confirmed that he had started work on his second solo album with Greg Kurstin and Andrew Wyatt. On 29 May 2019, Gallagher revealed that the album would be called Why Me? Why Not. On 7 June, "Shockwave" was released as the album's lead single. The same day, a documentary was released called As It Was, which chronicled Gallagher's return to music. On 27 June, Gallagher released another single titled "The River". On 26 July, he released a third single from the album, "Once", followed by a fourth single, "One of Us", on 15 August.

Gallagher played an acoustic set for MTV Unplugged in Hull City Hall on 3 August, showcasing his solo songs. "Once" debuted live and new songs "One of Us", "Now That I've Found You" (which was inspired by Gallagher's reunion with his daughter Molly), "Gone", and "Why Me? Why Not." were played publicly for the first time. Gallagher also performed several Oasis songs, including "Stand by Me" for the first time since 2001, and "Sad Song" which he had never performed live before. For the Oasis songs, Gallagher was joined on stage by former Oasis guitarist Paul "Bonehead" Arthurs. The special aired on 27 September, several hours after Why Me? Why Not. debuted at number one in the UK.

Why Me? Why Not. received mostly positive reviews from music critics. Many positive reviews complimented the album for expanding on the sound of As You Were, with Gallagher's vocals also being singled out for praise. At Metacritic, which assigns a normalized rating out of 100 to reviews from mainstream publications, the album received a weighted average score of 74 based on 19 reviews, indicating "generally favorable reviews". In November, he received the first Rock Icon award at the MTV Europe Music Awards. That same month, he announced that he would perform at Manchester's Heaton Park on 12 June 2020 and TRNSMT Festival on 11 July 2020.

=== 2020–2024: C'mon You Know and Liam Gallagher & John Squire ===
On 31 January 2020, Gallagher surprise released a live EP entitled Acoustic Sessions, which contained 7 live acoustic performances of both his solo and Oasis songs, as well as the original demo version of "Once". On 27 March, he announced that the Heaton Park show was cancelled due to the COVID-19 pandemic. In response to the pandemic, he announced that he would perform a free show for NHS staff at The O2 Arena on 29 October 2020, which was ultimately postponed to 17 August 2021. After the first worldwide COVID-19 lockdown began in March 2020, Gallagher posted several humorous video clips to Twitter of him singing various Oasis hits with reworked lyrics to advise his fans to wash their hands. Later that year, Gallagher released his MTV Unplugged performance as his first live album, MTV Unplugged (Live At Hull City Hall), containing 10 of the 17 songs played. It was released on 12 June 2020 and debuted at number one on the UK charts upon its release, becoming Gallagher's third UK no.1 album as a solo artist.

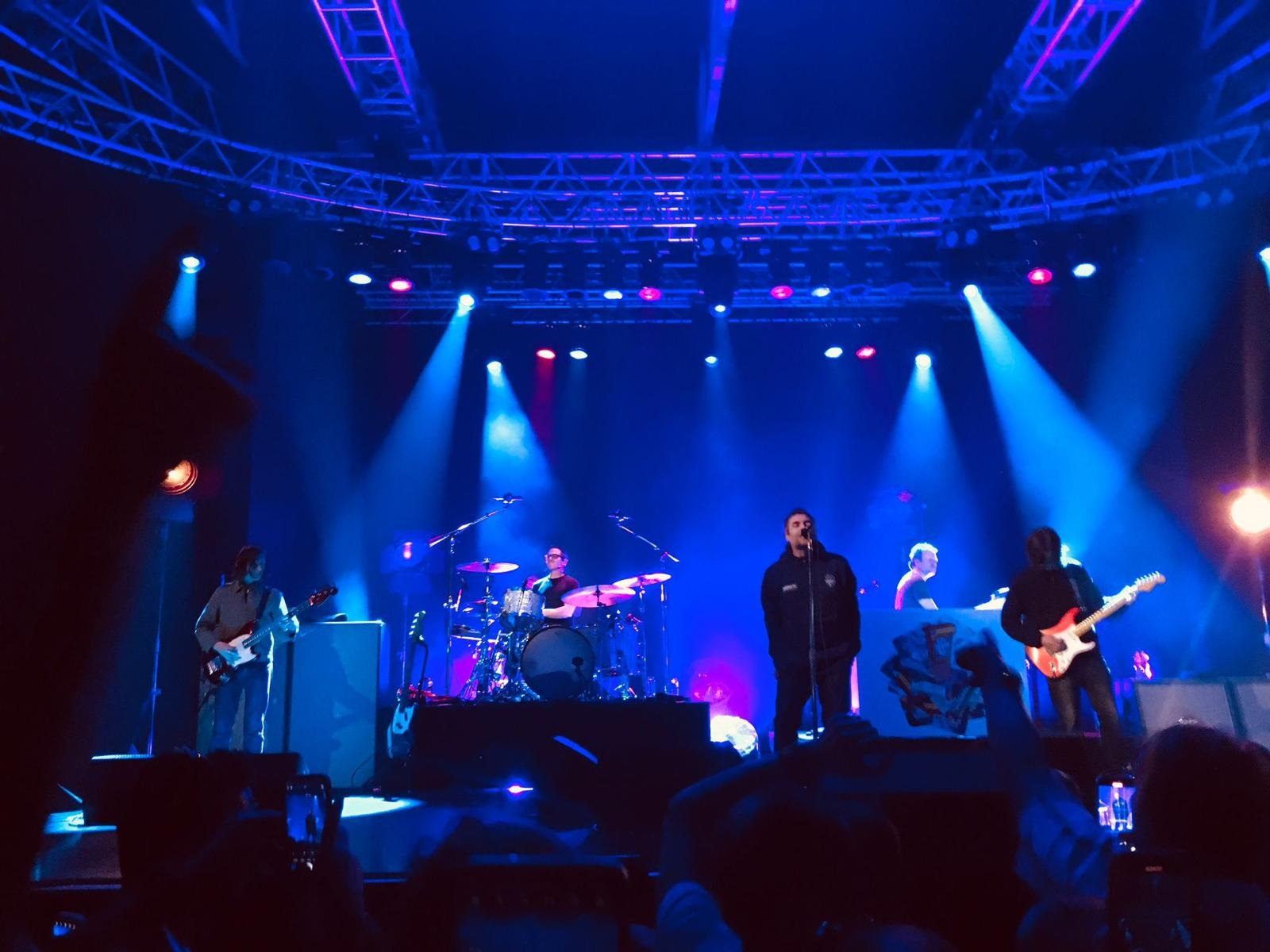
Gallagher and John Squire performing in Milan in April 2024

On 27 November 2020, Gallagher released a stand-alone single titled "All You're Dreaming Of". The proceeds from the song go to Action for Children. Peaking at No. 24, it became his fourth solo single to reach the UK top 40, while also becoming the UK's highest selling vinyl single of 2020.

In October 2021, Gallagher collaborated with Richard Ashcroft on a reworked version of "C'mon People (We're Making It Now)" for Ashcroft's album Acoustic Hymns Vol. 1.

On 1 October 2021, Gallagher announced that he would be releasing a third solo album, titled C'mon You Know, on 27 May 2022. Gallagher performed at Knebworth Park on 3 and 4 June 2022, nearly 26 years after he performed there with Oasis. On 11 October, Gallagher announced that he would also perform at the Etihad Stadium in Manchester on 1 June and Hampden Park in Glasgow on 26 June 2022.

On 20 January 2022, Gallagher announced that the first single to be released from C'mon You Know would be "Everything's Electric" co-written by Friedrich Kunath, Dave Grohl—who also provided drums—and Greg Kurstin. The track was released on 4 February 2022. Gallagher performed "Everything's Electric" at the 42nd Brit Awards on 8 February 2022. It debuted at number 18 on the UK Singles Chart Top 100 and debuted at number 1 on the UK Singles Sales Chart. The album's title track was released on 1 April. The album's third single "Better Days" was released 22 April with the song's proceeds going to War Child. The album's fourth single "Diamond In The Dark" was released on 26 May.

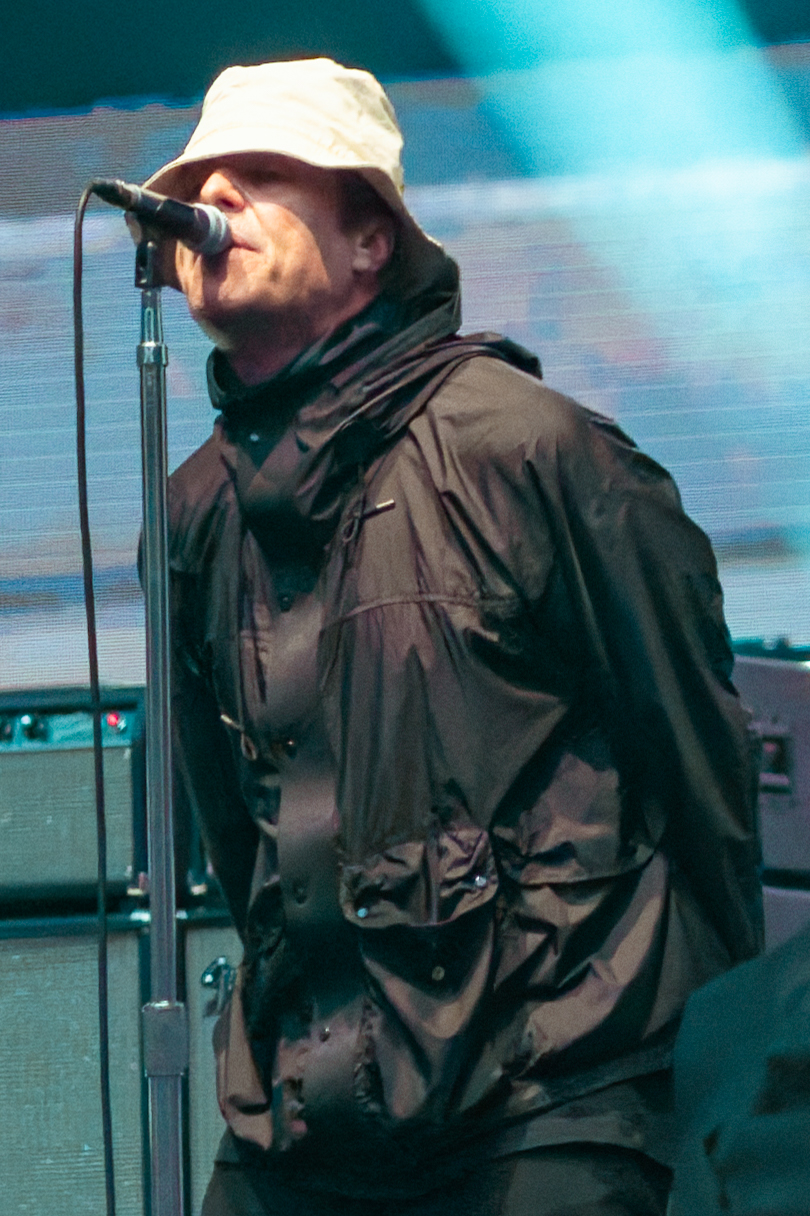
Gallagher performing with Oasis in August 2025

On 17 March, Gallagher announced that he would be releasing his Down By The River Thames performance as his second solo live album. It was released on 27 May 2022, the same day as C'mon You Know. On 3 and 4 June, Gallagher performed at Knebworth Festival in Hertfordshire. The concerts were performed on two consecutive nights which coincided with C'mon You Know becoming a number-one album in the UK national charts.

On 29 July, Gallagher released his second EP, Diamond In The Dark, which features a cover of "Bless You", originally recorded by John Lennon. On 10 October 2022, Gallagher released a fifth single from the album titled "Too Good For Giving Up" in partnership with mental health organisation Talk Club UK.

On 16 October 2023, Gallagher announced that he would do a tour to mark the thirtieth anniversary of Definitely Maybe in June 2024 where he would perform the album in its entirety alongside some of B-sides from the album's singles. On 21 November 2023, Gallagher announced that he would headline TRNSMT on 12 July 2024.

In 2024, Gallagher collaborated with ex-Stone Roses guitarist John Squire on the album Liam Gallagher & John Squire, which was released on 1 March 2024; the album was preceded by the singles "Just Another Rainbow" and "Mars to Liverpool". The album debuted in the top position on the U.K. charts. Squire and Gallagher announced a tour on 26 January 2024 which concluded that April.

=== 2024–2025: Oasis Live '25 ===
On 27 August 2024, it was announced that both Liam and Noel Gallagher would reform Oasis and embark on a tour in 2025. The first tour date was 4 July 2025 in Cardiff, and the last day of the tour was on 23 November 2025 in São Paulo, Brazil. Other tour locations include stops in the United Kingdom, Ireland, Asia, Australia and the Americas. The week of 10 August 2025, Gallagher announced he would stop throwing his maracas during concerts after accidentally hitting a forty-two year old woman with the maracas and having been told not to.

== Controversies ==
With the appearance of Oasis on the music scene in 1994, Gallagher quickly made a public name for himself with his "loutish" behaviour. By 2000, his reputation and confrontational persona saw him feature in a Channel 4 documentary Hellraisers along with actors Peter O'Toole, Oliver Reed and Richard Harris and musicians Keith Moon and Ozzy Osbourne.

After an argument on a flight from Hong Kong to Perth in 1998 that apparently involved a scone, Gallagher was banned for life from Cathay Pacific Airways; he responded that he would "rather walk". During the band's Australian tour at the time, he was arrested and charged with assault after allegedly headbutting a 19-year-old fan who claimed he was only asking Gallagher for a photo. Criminal charges were later dropped, although a civil case was pursued that led to Gallagher reportedly settling out of court. In 2006, Gallagher allegedly had a drunken brawl with footballer Paul Gascoigne at the Groucho Club in London, which ended with him setting off a fire extinguisher in Gascoigne's face.

On an early U.S. tour, Gallagher made derogatory remarks about Americans, as well as his brother Noel, which led to an ultimatum from the latter, who briefly left the band in 1994. When addressing their muted reception in the U.S. (especially in comparison with their home country), Gallagher said, "Americans want grungy people, stabbing themselves in the head on stage. They get a bright bunch like us, with deodorant on, they don't get it."

On receiving an award at the 2010 Brit Awards for the best album of the past 30 years, Gallagher swore while he thanked all the former members of Oasis except for his brother. He then dropped the microphone and gave the award to a member of the crowd. Gallagher's behaviour prompted that year's host, Peter Kay, to brand him a "knobhead", much to the applause of the audience.

On 1 July 2025, Gallagher tweeted "Chingchong", which is widely recognised as a racial slur mocking Asians. He initially dismissed concerns with "whatever", but later deleted the post and issued an apology. Some Asian fans, particularly those from China and South Korea, called for a boycott of Oasis' Asian tour concerts.

== Musical style and inspirations ==
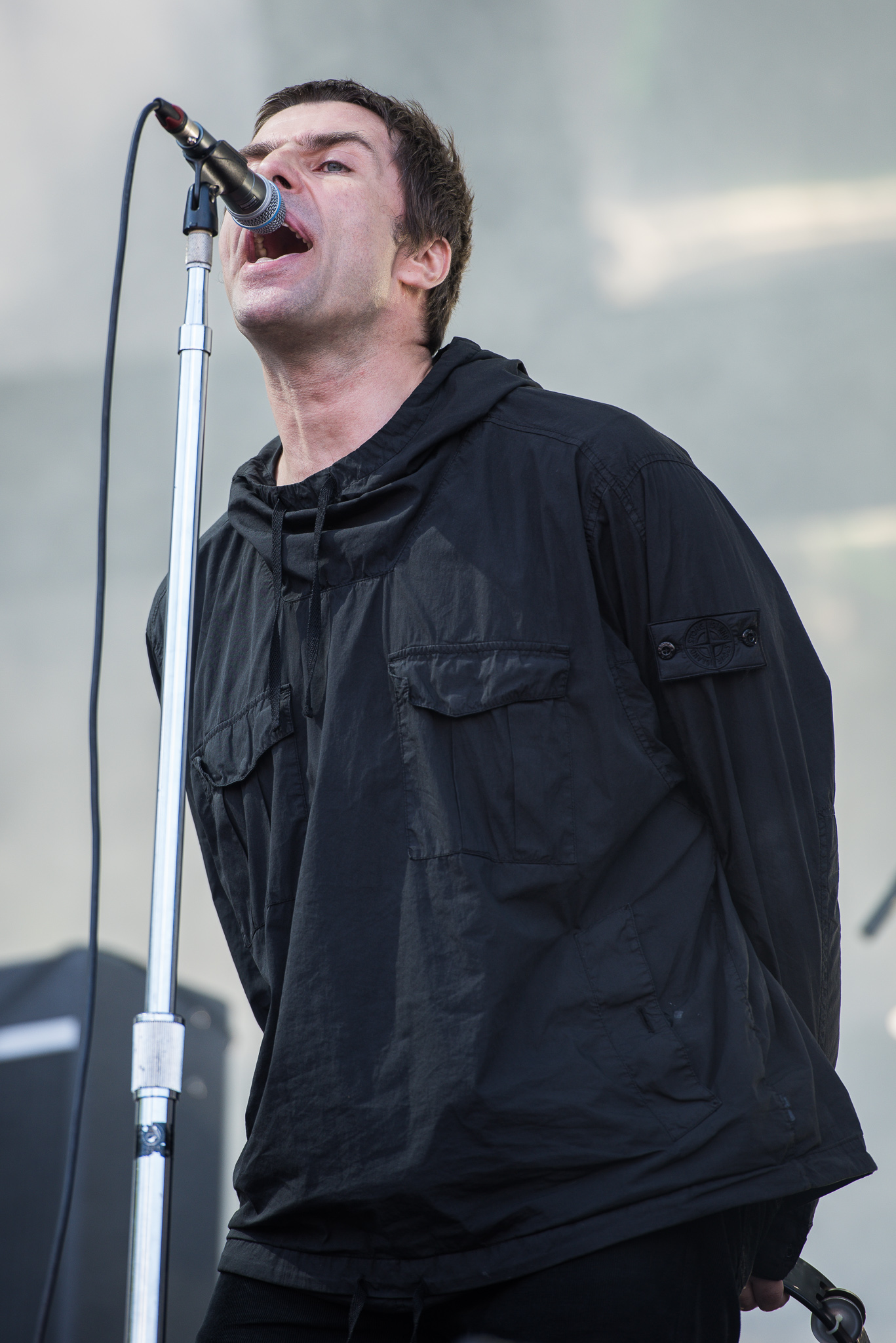
Gallagher's singing pose, with his arms behind his back and head arched up towards the microphone, 2017

Gallagher's voice has been compared to a blend of John Lennon, Johnny Rotten and Ian Brown. He has stated he has no clear influence other than Lennon and "music" itself, though he has been known to incorporate many different forms such as punk, indie, new wave, and jazz. On his singing, Spin magazine states that he "twists vowels to the stretching point Johnny Rotten-style — 'sun-shee-ine'".

Gallagher has long been closely associated with Lennon, and The Beatles more broadly as a formative influence; in 2005, The Guardian wrote that Liam and Noel Gallagher "worship" Lennon above all others, and a 2017 Rolling Stone profile described Lennon as Gallagher's "hero" and "spiritual fucking guide".

Gallagher has identified Rotten's band the Sex Pistols as being one he would have liked to front, having stated that he can impersonate Rotten "in his sleep". On the Definitely Maybe DVD, Gallagher revealed that the reason he sings with his arms behind his back is because it allows him to project more power through his voice. His singing pose also sees him leaning forward, arching his head up towards the microphone on the stand.

Gallagher stated that his first record purchase was the debut album of the Stone Roses. In 2017, Gallagher admitted that had it not been for pop singer Madonna, he would have never entered the music industry. Recalling a childhood anecdote, he said he was "blown away" the first time he heard her song "Like a Virgin".

== Other projects ==
On 7 May 2010, it was confirmed that Gallagher's production company In 1 Productions would adapt the Richard DiLello book about the Beatles' record label Apple Corps, called The Longest Cocktail Party, into a feature film. As of 2024, the film has yet to be completed. Gallagher was previously the owner of the clothing range Pretty Green, named after a song by the Jam.

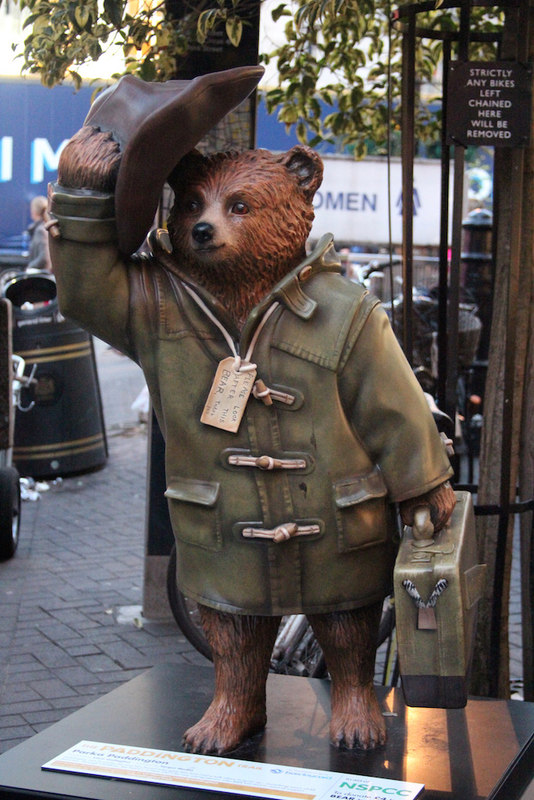
Gallagher's Parka-themed Paddington Bear statue in Carnaby Street, London, auctioned to raise funds for the NSPCC

In 2014, Gallagher designed a Parka-wearing Paddington Bear statue, one of fifty located around London prior to the release of the film Paddington, which was auctioned to raise funds for the National Society for the Prevention of Cruelty to Children (NSPCC).

In March 2015, Gallagher appeared alongside Stephen Fry in a short film for Comic Relief titled National Treasures. In June, he played in a charity football match at the Juventus Stadium in Turin and performed on a special episode of TFI Friday. For the latter, he performed "My Generation" by the Who as part of a supergroup which included Paul Arthurs, Roger Daltrey, Jay Mehler, and former Oasis collaborator Zak Starkey.

In October 2017, Gallagher appeared in the George Michael documentary Freedom, in which he referred to the recently deceased Michael as a "modern-day Elvis", particularly praising his 1990 single "Praying for Time". On 3 November, he made an appearance alongside his mother Peggy and son Gene in a celebrity edition of the Channel 4 series Gogglebox in aid of Stand Up to Cancer. In December, he narrated the Climate Coalition's "alternative Christmas advert" depicting a snowman melting due to climate change.

Gallagher released a documentary in 2019 called As It Was, following his life after Beady Eye and his life leading up to his solo debut album As You Were.

Gallagher stars alongside sons Lennon and Gene in a documentary called Liam Gallagher: 48 Hours at Rockfield, which documents a 48-hour period in Rockfield Studios with exclusive performances and interviews. It was released in May 2022.

Gallagher is among the people interviewed for the documentary film If These Walls Could Sing directed by Mary McCartney about the recording studios at Abbey Road.

== Personal life ==
=== Relationships ===
In 1995, Gallagher started dating actress Patsy Kensit and they married on 7 April 1997 at Marylebone Town Hall. Two months later, he began an affair with singer Lisa Moorish in Los Angeles, and she gave birth to a daughter, Molly, on 26 March 1998. Gallagher did not meet Molly until May 2018, after which he expressed hope that he would have a continued presence in her life. Gallagher and Kensit's son Lennon was born on 13 September 1999. Gallagher and Kensit became members of the Primrose Hill set and they attracted significant media attention during their relationship, becoming known for their high-profile social life, parties, public disputes and displays of affection. They divorced in 2000. Gallagher's second son Gene was born to Canadian singer Nicole Appleton of the girl group All Saints on 2 July 2001. After being together for nearly eight years, Gallagher and Appleton married on 14 February 2008, also at Marylebone Town Hall.

From 2011 to 2012, Gallagher had an affair with journalist Liza Ghorbani, who gave birth to a daughter Gemma in January 2013. The affair was publicly revealed five months later, after he had separated from Appleton and started dating Debbie Gwyther, who is his manager and publicist. During this time, he briefly moved to his mother's house in Ireland, and he was divorced from Appleton in April 2014. His relationship with brother Noel further deteriorated following the severe financial pressures resulting from Liam's divorce and family court settlements, and again when Liam's requests for Noel to take part in an Oasis reunion to help him raise funds were ignored. In 2019, in a BBC documentary about his life, Gallagher praised each of the four mothers of his children for raising the children to be "good people".

During a holiday on the Amalfi Coast in August 2019, Gallagher proposed to Gwyther. They live in the Highgate area of London with their two cats, Sid and Nancy, whom they adopted from Wood Green Animal Charity and their dog Buttons, whom they adopted from Happy Doggo in Thailand.

Gallagher's first grandchild, who is the son of Molly and footballer Nat Phillips, was born in September 2025.

=== Views ===
Gallagher endorsed the Labour Party in the 2017 UK general election. He has discussed his concerns on climate change, having publicly praised Swedish climate activist Greta Thunberg, and voted for the Green Party in the 2019 UK general election. He has called people involved with cancel culture "fucking squares" and elaborated, "Unless they come around to your house and say you're cancelled, you're still going to do your fucking thing. ... You can still go and do your gig, there are people out there who are going to like what you've got to say."

When asked about Brexit in a 2017 interview, Gallagher said:

"I love Europe. I guess the borders have got to be tightened but all that stuff about going 'this is my country', I don't get that. We all live under one sky. I certainly don't sit there and go 'this is my [expletive] England, stay out', but I think we should definitely keep an eye on who's coming in and out of the country. That just makes common sense because you don't want a load of loony[s] coming in. But good people should be allowed to move and groove wherever they want."

=== Hobbies ===
Gallagher is a supporter of Manchester City FC. In 2019, he revealed that he never learned how to drive or swim. He has cited Quadrophenia, Scarface, Seven and Trainspotting as his favourite films. Whilst on The 2 Johnnies podcast, Gallagher revealed that he supported the Mayo Gaelic Football Team and watches the All-Ireland Senior Football Championship final every year.

=== Health ===
Gallagher often goes jogging, but revealed in 2019 that he had begun to suffer from arthritis of the hips and that doctors had advised him to jog less. In early 2023, Gallagher underwent hip surgery. He also suffers from psoriasis, which has forced him to sometimes wear protective gloves, and hay fever.

Gallagher fell out of a helicopter following his headline set at the 2021 Isle of Wight Festival, sustaining cuts and bruises to his face. The injuries were severe enough for Gallagher to delay his performance at the 2021 edition of the Belsonic festival to the 2022 edition.

=== Relationship with Noel Gallagher ===
During Oasis's American tour in 1994, Liam frequently changed the words of Noel's songs so that they were offensive to both Americans and Noel. In September 1994, Oasis played at the Whisky a Go Go in Los Angeles. The day of the show Oasis had been using methamphetamine that they believed was cocaine. The band made several mistakes and tensions arose on stage between Liam and Noel, eventually leading to Liam hitting Noel in the head with his tambourine. After the show, Noel shortly left the tour and went to San Francisco.

During the 1995 recording sessions for (What's the Story) Morning Glory?, the brothers had a fight when Liam invited everyone from a local pub back to the studio, while Noel was trying to work, culminating in Noel hitting Liam over the head with a cricket bat. Noel later described this event as "possibly the biggest fight we ever had".

In August 1996, after a record-breaking pair of shows at Knebworth, tension mounted between the Gallaghers when Liam backed out of Oasis's MTV Unplugged set minutes before it was due to start. Noel was forced to fill in at the last minute. Liam said that he had been struck down with a "sore throat" and that he does not like performing acoustically, though Noel has claimed he was hungover. Noel was further angered when Liam heckled him from the balcony while the band performed.

While on tour in Barcelona in May 2000, Oasis were forced to cancel a show when drummer Alan White's arm seized up; the band spent the evening drinking instead. During the night Liam made a crude remark about Noel's wife, Meg Mathews (apparently questioning the legitimacy of Noel's baby daughter Anaïs), leading to a fight. Following this, a press release was put out declaring that Noel had decided to quit overseas touring with Oasis. The rest of the band, with guitarist Matt Deighton replacing Noel, played the remaining dates. Noel eventually returned for the British and Irish legs of the tour; at the first of these shows the brothers shook hands after the song "Acquiesce".

In 2009, prior to the group's break, Noel called Liam "rude, arrogant, intimidating, and lazy", describing him as "the angriest man you'll ever meet ... like a man with a fork in a world of soup". The final straw for the band came at Rock En Seine in Paris, when an altercation between the brothers (subsequently described by Noel as "no physical violence but there was a lot of World Wrestling Federation stuff") prior to their performance resulted in the destruction of Noel's guitar and saw him announce his departure from the group. Liam later claimed he "messed the first one up" when questioned about his 2019 MTV Unplugged performance and has since claimed he missed the show because he "accidentally got drunk again".

During the Dig Out Your Soul Tour, the only time that they ever spoke directly was when onstage. Noel would later reveal that while they were in Oasis, the two "never hung out together outside of the band, ever". When speaking to Sky News, Noel denied any invitation being received and remarked that as he was not invited to Liam's previous weddings "I'm not going to go to this one, am I?". Noel has said that Oasis came down to the relationship between him and Liam. Weeks prior to this, Noel said Liam was "obsessed with him", leading Liam to allege the same thing about Noel. During his Definitely Maybe 30th anniversary tour in 2024, Liam reserved a seat for Noel at every gig.

On 27 August 2024, Liam and Noel announced their plans to reunite and reform Oasis for the band's first tour in 15 years, which took place in 2025. The brothers later both separately confirmed that there is no animosity between them anymore.

== Discography ==
with Oasis

- Definitely Maybe (1994)
- (What's the Story) Morning Glory? (1995)
- Be Here Now (1997)
- Standing on the Shoulder of Giants (2000)
- Heathen Chemistry (2002)
- Don't Believe the Truth (2005)
- Dig Out Your Soul (2008)

with Beady Eye

- Different Gear, Still Speeding (2011)
- BE (2013)

Solo albums

- As You Were (2017)
- Why Me? Why Not. (2019)
- C'mon You Know (2022)

with John Squire

- Liam Gallagher John Squire (2024)

== Awards and nominations ==
Year	Awards	Work	Category	Result
1996	NME Awards	Oasis	Best Act	Won
1996	NME Awards	Oasis	Best Live Band	Won
1997	NME Awards	Oasis	Best Live Band	Won
1998	NME Awards	Oasis	Best Live Act	Won
1999	NME Awards	Oasis	Band of the Year	Won
2001	NME Awards	Oasis	Best Live Band	Won
2003	NME Awards	Oasis	Best Live Band	Won
2017	NME Awards	Oasis:Supersonic	Best Music Film	Won
2017	Q Awards	"Wall of Glass"	Best Track	Nominated
2017	Q Awards	Himself	Best Live Act	Won
2017	GQ Awards	Himself	Rock n Roll Star of the Year	Won
2018	Brit Awards	Himself	British Male Solo Artist	Nominated
2019	MTV Europe Music Award	Himself	Best Rock	Nominated
2019	MTV Europe Music Award	Himself	Rock Icon	Won
2019	Scottish Music Awards	Himself	Best UK Artist	Won
2020	MTV Europe Music Award	Himself	Best Rock	Nominated
2024	MTV Europe Music Award	Himself	Best Rock	Won

== Backing band members ==
Current

- Mike Moore – guitar (2017–2024)
- Drew McConnell – bass, backing vocals (2017–2024)
- Dan McDougall – drums, backing vocals (2017–2024)
- Jay Mehler – guitar (2017–2024)
- Paul "Bonehead" Arthurs – guitar (2017–2022, 2023–2024)
- Christian Madden – keyboards (2017–2024)

Former

- Adam Falkner – drums (2023)
- Barrie Cadogan – guitar (2022–2023)
