= Gem Archer =

English musician (born 1966)

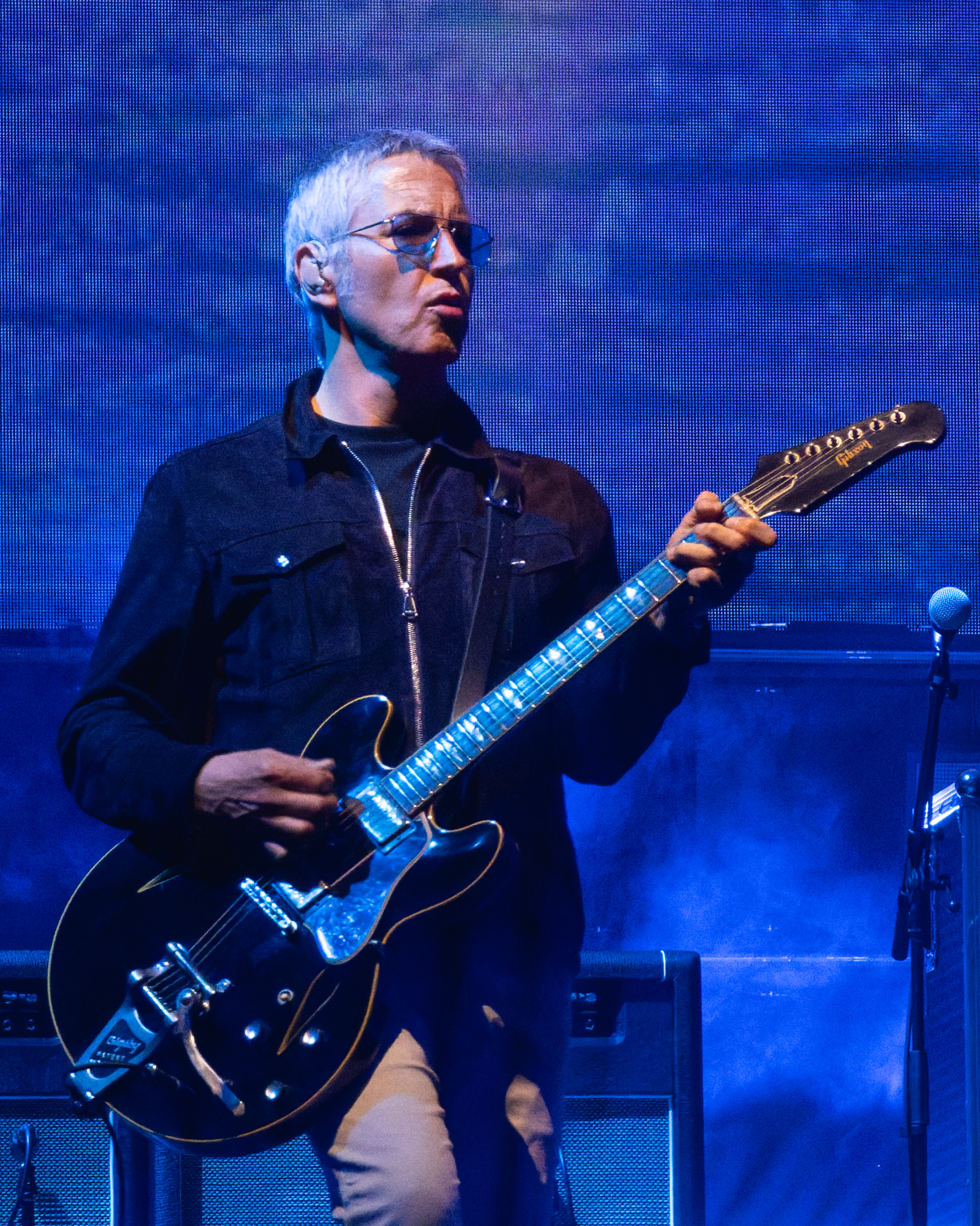
- Archer performing with Oasis in July 2025

Background information
- Born: Colin Murray Archer; 7 December 1966 (age 59); Hunwick, Durham, England
- Genres: Britpop; glam rock; alternative rock; indie rock; funk rock
- Occupations: Musician; songwriter
- Instruments: Guitar; vocals
- Years active: 1981–present
- Labels: Creation; Big Brother
- Member of: Oasis; Noel Gallagher's High Flying Birds
- Formerly of: The Edge; Whirlpool; Heavy Stereo; Ben and the Bends; Proud Mary; Beady Eye
- Spouse: Christine Biller (m. 2022)

Colin Murray "Gem" Archer (/ɡɛm/ GEHM; born 7 December 1966) is an English guitarist, singer and songwriter. He is best known as a member of the rock band Oasis, where he plays rhythm and lead guitar. He has also been a member of the Oasis-associated bands, Beady Eye and Noel Gallagher's High Flying Birds. Prior to joining Oasis, Archer fronted the alternative rock band Heavy Stereo between 1993 and 1999, releasing one studio album, Déjà Voodoo (1996), on Creation Records.

Archer joined Oasis in September 1999, following the departure of founding guitarist Paul "Bonehead" Arthurs, and was a member of the band for ten years until the band's break-up in 2009. Archer contributed to the band's final three albums – Heathen Chemistry (2002), Don't Believe the Truth (2005) and Dig Out Your Soul (2008) – often contributing to the songwriting process and receiving sole songwriting credits on several songs.

Following Oasis's break-up in August 2009, Archer, frontman Liam Gallagher, bass guitarist Andy Bell and drummer Chris Sharrock continued writing and recording together under the name Beady Eye, releasing two studio albums – Different Gear, Still Speeding (2011) and BE (2013) – before disbanding in October 2014. In 2017, Archer joined Noel Gallagher's High Flying Birds as lead guitarist, reuniting him with Oasis member Noel Gallagher, and making him and Sharrock the only members of Oasis to have been part of both Liam and Noel Gallagher's post-Oasis projects. In 2024, after a fifteen-year break from the band, Archer rejoined Oasis ahead of their Oasis Live '25 Tour. In 2026, he was inducted into the Rock and Roll Hall of Fame as a member of Oasis.

== Career ==
=== The Edge and the Contenders ===
Archer began his musical career as lead guitarist in a group called the Edge in the early 1981. They released two singles, "Take a Walk" and "Little Girl Blue". In early 1987, he was part of a band called the Contenders. He then formed Whirlpool in 1991 and signed to Food Records and EMI Publishing.

=== Heavy Stereo ===
Archer formed Heavy Stereo with bassist Nez and guitarist Pete Downing both previously of Redcar indie band 2 Lost Sons and were subsequently signed with Creation Records. The band's only album, 1996's Déjà Voodoo, did not enjoy much critical or commercial success. However, Heavy Stereo's next release did receive more attention through demos of new material, a critically acclaimed contribution to the Jam tribute album, Fire and Skill: The Songs of the Jam, and opening on a Paul Weller tour.

=== Oasis ===
Archer was asked to joined Oasis after Paul "Bonehead" Arthurs left the group. He was paid a standard session wage, about £85 a gig, as the new Oasis rhythm guitarist. His first official duty was to appear on the "Go Let It Out" video – on which he played lead guitar, as Andy Bell had yet to take over bass, so Noel played bass with Liam on acoustic guitar and vocals.

His first songwriting contribution after joining Oasis was "Hung in a Bad Place", which appeared on Oasis' fifth album Heathen Chemistry. This song was picked up for use in a commercial for Victoria's Secret in the US. His role was expanded on Oasis' sixth studio album, Don't Believe the Truth, which features Archer's "A Bell Will Ring" and "Love Like a Bomb", the latter of which he co-wrote with Liam Gallagher. He also contributed the B-sides "Eyeball Tickler" and "The Quiet Ones" – an acoustic song. He also wrote "To Be Where There's Life" on the 2008 album Dig Out Your Soul. In 2024, it was revealed that Archer would take part of the Oasis Live '25 shows.

=== Beady Eye ===
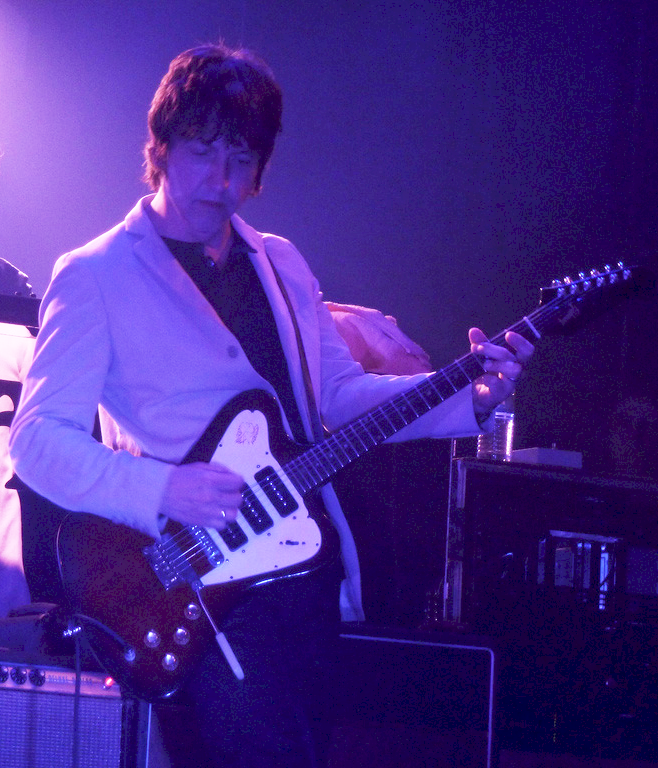
Archer performing with Beady Eye in 2011

Noel Gallagher quit Oasis in August 2009, following an argument with his brother in Paris. Gallagher placed part of the blame for his decision to leave on Archer and Andy Bell for a lack of support saying "the lack of support and understanding from my band mates has left me with no other option than to get me cape and seek pastures new." Soon afterwards the band announced they had split. However, Archer, Bell, Liam Gallagher and Oasis live drummer Chris Sharrock resolved to work together on a new project under a new name, Beady Eye.

Archer contributed guitar, bass and backing vocals to Beady Eye's debut album Different Gear, Still Speeding, released on 28 February 2011.

Archer also contributed guitar, keyboards, and backing vocals on Beady Eye's second album BE, released on 10 June 2013.

On 25 October 2014, Liam Gallagher announced, via Twitter, that Beady Eye had disbanded.

=== Noel Gallagher's High Flying Birds ===
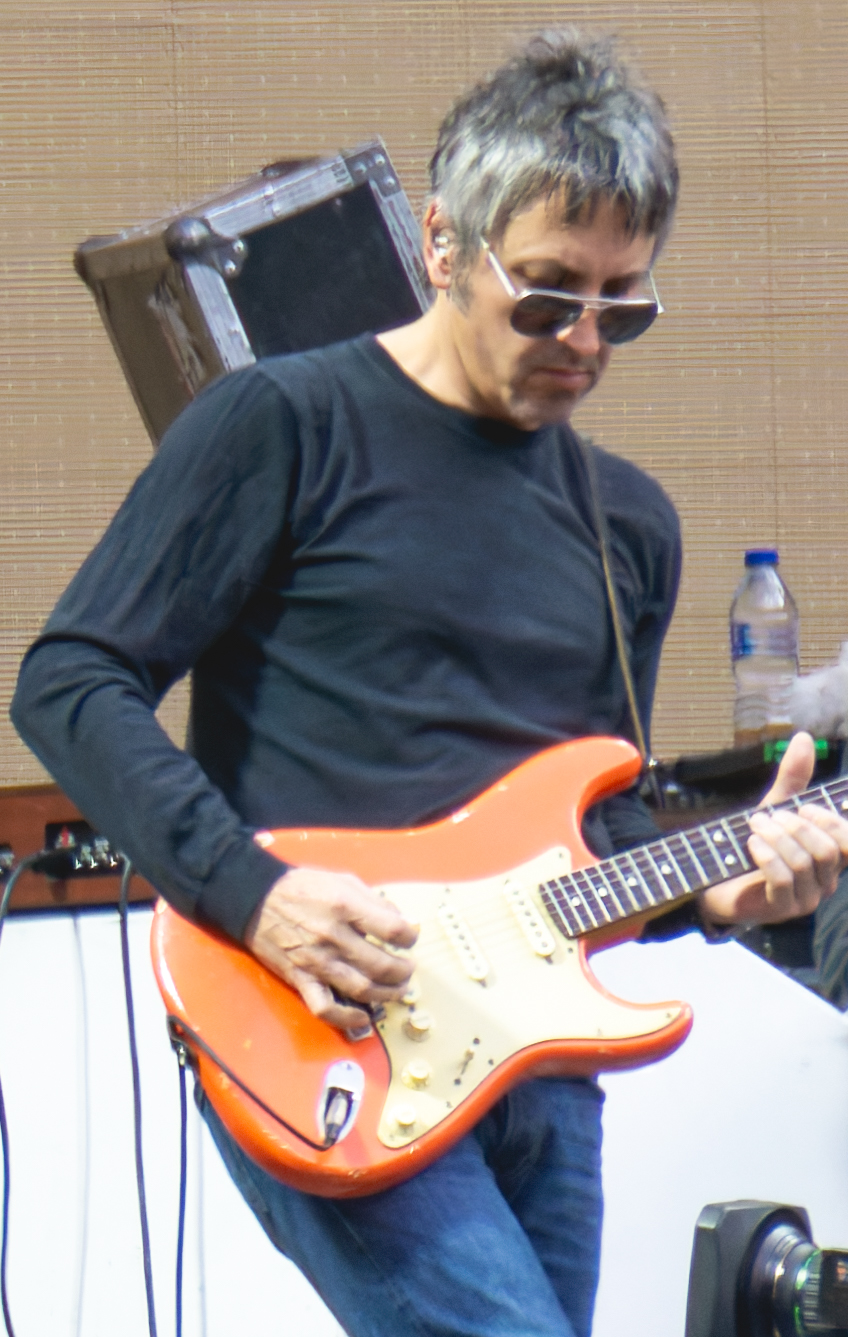
Archer performing with Noel Gallagher's High Flying Birds in July 2017

In December 2015, Archer appeared with Noel Gallagher at an acoustic gig in Lincoln, followed by an appearance for BBC Radio 2.

In October 2016, Archer joined Noel Gallagher's High Flying Birds for their performance of "Half the World Away" dedicated to Caroline Aherne for Channel 4's Stand Up to Cancer telethon; leading to speculation he had become a permanent member of the band.

In July 2017, it was confirmed that Archer had become a permanent member of Noel Gallagher's High Flying Birds.

=== Other work ===
Outside of Oasis, Archer has collaborated with a few other artists, most notably Paul Weller. He has contributed acoustic guitar to the song "One x One" on Weller's 2002 album Illumination and guitars and Mellotron to the song "Echoes Round the Sun" on Weller's 2008 album 22 Dreams. He participated in an acoustic tour of the US with Weller when Steve Cradock of Ocean Colour Scene was unavailable, and provided guitar and backing vocals at the 2010 NME Awards when Weller performed a live set.

He also contributed guitar to David Holmes' 1997 album Let's Get Killed.

He also assisted Noel Gallagher in producing the first Proud Mary album, a band signed to Gallagher's Sour Mash record label.

According to album notes, Archer also worked with his good friend and previous Oasis and Beady Eye colleague Andy Bell on his debut solo album (now under the "Glok" alias) called The View from Halfway Down, contributing some drums, bass and guitar tracks, and also doing some of the recording work.

== Personal life ==
On 1 August 2013, Archer was admitted to hospital with serious head trauma and a fractured skull after a freak accident at home, by falling down a flight of stairs. After several scans, to ensure that there was no long-term effects, Beady Eye's V-Festival act was cancelled, so that he could be kept under observation. He was later said to be in a stable condition.

On 26 November 2022, Archer married Christine Mary Biller in London.
