= Standing on the Shoulder of Giants Tour =

1999–2001 concert tour by Oasis

- Tour by Oasis
- Poster for concerts in the UK
- Location: Asia; Europe; North America; South America
- Associated album: Standing on the Shoulder of Giants
- Start date: 3 December 1999
- End date: 31 July 2001
- Legs: 4
- No. of shows: 133

Oasis concert chronology
- Be Here Now Tour (1997–98); Standing on the Shoulder of Giants Tour (1999–2001); The Tour of Brotherly Love (2001)

The Standing on the Shoulder of Giants Tour was a concert tour by English band Oasis, which took place in 1999–2001 in support of their fourth studio album Standing on the Shoulder of Giants.

The tour marked Oasis' first sustained world touring cycle following the departures of rhythm guitarist Paul "Bonehead" Arthurs and bassist Paul "Guigsy" McGuigan, with Gem Archer and Andy Bell joining the live lineup in their place.

== Background ==
Following the extensive Be Here Now era, Oasis entered a transitional period that reshaped both the group’s internal dynamic and their live sound. The touring cycle for Standing on the Shoulder of Giants combined arena and festival dates with smaller promotional and warm-up appearances, and it introduced a setlist that foregrounded new material such as "Go Let It Out", "Who Feels Love?" and "Gas Panic!" alongside established hits and selected deep cuts.

Four warm-up dates took place in the United States in December 1999, before the main tour started.

== History ==
=== 2000: Club shows, escalation, and Noel Gallagher's temporary departure ===
The main 2000 itinerary combined early, lower-capacity European dates with a larger North American leg and a run of major summer stadium and festival appearances.

In May 2000, Noel Gallagher left the tour after a physical altercation with Liam. Though, Oasis continued the European dates without him, using Matt Deighton as a stand-in guitarist for the affected shows, before Noel returned later in the touring cycle.

=== Wembley Stadium recordings ===
The live album Familiar to Millions was recorded at the two concerts at Wembley Stadium. Due to Liam Gallagher being drunk at the second concert, voiceovers were used from concerts in Yokohama. The second Wembley Stadium concert was also broadcast worldwide the same evening.

Noel Gallagher dedicated the cover of the Neil Young song "Hey Hey, My My (Into the Black)" to Kurt Cobain when they played in his hometown of Seattle on the sixth anniversary of his death.

=== 2001: Festival appearances and late-cycle dates ===
The later phase of the tour included major festival performances and select international dates in 2001.

== Stage setup and presentation ==
The tour adopted a more produced opening sequence than earlier Oasis tours, regularly using taped introductions such as "Fuckin' in the Bushes" and prominent lighting cues to lead into the set.

== Set list ==
This set list is representative of the performance on 21 July 2000 at Wembley Stadium in London. It does not represent the set list at all concerts for the duration of the tour.

"Fuckin' in the Bushes" (tape)

1. "Go Let It Out"
2. "Who Feels Love?"
3. "Supersonic"
4. "Shakermaker"
5. "Acquiesce"
6. "Step Out"
7. "Gas Panic!"
8. "Roll with It"
9. "Stand by Me"
10. "Wonderwall"
11. "Cigarettes & Alcohol"
12. "Don't Look Back in Anger"
13. "Live Forever"

Encore

14. "Hey Hey, My My (Into the Black)"
15. "Champagne Supernova"
16. "Rock 'n' Roll Star"

Other songs performed:

1. "Some Might Say"
2. "Where Did It All Go Wrong?"
3. "Sunday Morning Call"
4. "D'You Know What I Mean?"
5. "My Generation"
6. "Helter Skelter"
7. "I Can See a Liar"
8. "Columbia"
9. "Morning Glory"
10. "Slide Away"
11. "I Am the Walrus"

== Critical reception ==
Contemporary reviews frequently contrasted the tour’s polished presentation and heavy rotation of Standing on the Shoulder of Giants material with Oasis’ earlier mid-1990s performances, with particular attention given to the intensity of "Gas Panic!" in live settings.

Coverage of the Wembley Stadium shows and the resulting Familiar to Millions release also became central to the tour’s press narrative, including commentary on Liam Gallagher’s performances and on-stage behaviour.

== Tour dates ==
List of 1999 concerts
Date	City	Country	Venue	Opening Act	Attendance	Notes
3 December 1999 (Note: The 3 December 1999 concert in Philadelphia was part of Y100 Feastival.)	Philadelphia	United States	First Union Center			
4 December 1999 (Note: The 4 December 1999 concert in Rosemont was part of Q101 Twisted Xmas.)	Rosemont	United States	Allstate Arena			
5 December 1999 (Note: The 5 December 1999 concert in Detroit was part of The Night 89X Stole Christmas.)	Detroit	United States	Cobo Arena			
11 December 1999 (Note: The 5 December 1999 concert in Anaheim was part of KROQ Almost Acoustic Christmas.)	Anaheim	United States	Arrowhead Pond of Anaheim			

List of 2000 concerts
Date	City	Country	Venue	Opening Act	Attendance	Notes
29 February 2000	Yokohama	Japan	Yokohama Arena	—N/a	17,000±	
1 March 2000	Nagoya	Japan	Nagoya Rainbow Hall	—N/a		
3 March 2000	Fukuoka	Japan	Marine Messe Fukuoka	—N/a		
5 March 2000	Yokohama	Japan	Yokohama Arena	—N/a	17,000±	
6 March 2000	Yokohama	Japan	Yokohama Arena	—N/a	17,000±	
7 March 2000	Yokohama	Japan	Yokohama Arena	—N/a	17,000±	
9 March 2000	Osaka	Japan	Osaka-jō Hall	—N/a		
11 March 2000	Kobe	Japan	World Memorial Hall	—N/a		
12 March 2000	Kobe	Japan	World Memorial Hall	—N/a		
14 March 2000	Hiroshima	Japan	Hiroshima Green Arena	—N/a		
16 March 2000	Sendai	Japan	Miyagi Prefectural Sports Center	—N/a		
21 March 2000	Paris	France	Bataclan	—N/a		
23 March 2000	Brussels	Belgium	Ancienne Belgique	—N/a		
25 March 2000	Cologne	Germany	E-Werk	—N/a		
5 April 2000	Seattle	United States	Paramount Theater	Travis		
6 April 2000	Portland	United States	Arlene Schnitzer Concert Hall	Travis		
8 April 2000	Berkeley	United States	Berkeley Community Theatre	Travis		
9 April 2000	Los Angeles	United States	Universal Amphitheatre	Travis		
11 April 2000	Las Vegas	United States	House of Blues	Travis		
13 April 2000	Denver	United States	Denver Auditorium Arena	Travis		
15 April 2000	Minneapolis	United States	State Theatre	Travis		
16 April 2000	Milwaukee	United States	Riverside Theater	Travis		
18 April 2000	Chicago	United States	Chicago Theatre	Travis		
19 April 2000	Detroit	United States	State Theatre	Travis		
21 April 2000	Akron	United States	E. J. Thomas Hall	Travis		
22 April 2000	Indianapolis	United States	Murat Theatre	Travis		
24 April 2000	Columbus	United States	Palace Theatre	Travis		
26 April 2000	Upper Darby Township	United States	Tower Theater	Travis		
27 April 2000	Boston	United States	Orpheum Theatre	Travis		
29 April 2000	Toronto	Canada	Maple Leaf Gardens	Travis		
1 May 2000	New York City	United States	Radio City Music Hall	Travis		
3 May 2000	Fairfax	United States	Patriot Center	Travis		
5 May 2000 (Note: The 5 May 2000 concert in Atlanta was part of Music Midtown.)	Atlanta	United States	Piedmont Park	—N/a		
8 May 2000	Mexico City	Mexico	Palacio de los Deportes	—N/a		
17 May 2000	Lisbon	Portugal	Praça Sony	—N/a		
19 May 2000	Leganés	Spain	La Cubierta	—N/a		
30 May 2000	Milan	Italy	FilaForum	Johnny Marr and the Healers		
31 May 2000	Zürich	Switzerland	Saalsporthalle	Johnny Marr and the Healers		
2 June 2000	Vienna	Austria	Wiener Stadthalle	Johnny Marr and the Healers		
3 June 2000	Leipzig	Germany	Haus Auensee	Johnny Marr and the Healers		
5 June 2000	Warsaw	Poland	Torwar Hall	Johnny Marr and the Healers		
7 June 2000	Berlin	Germany	Arena Berlin	Johnny Marr and the Healers		
9 June 2000 (Note: The 9 June 2000 concert in Nürburg was part of Rock am Ring.)	Nürburg	Germany	Nürburgring	—N/a		
10 June 2000 (Note: The 10 June 2000 concert in Landgraaf was part of Pinkpop Festival.)	Landgraaf	Netherlands	Megaland	—N/a		
11 June 2000 (Note: The 11 June 2000 concert in Nuremberg was part of Rock im Park.)	Nuremberg	Germany	Frankenstadion	—N/a		
15 June 2000 (Note: The 15 June 2000 concert in Hultsfred was part of Hultsfredsfestivalen.)	Hultsfred	Sweden	Hultsfreds Hembygdspark	—N/a		
18 June 2000 (Note: The 18 June 2000 concert in Imola was part of Heineken Jammin' Festival.)	Imola	Italy	Autodromo Enzo e Dino Ferrari	—N/a		
19 June 2000	Marseille	France	Le Dôme de Marseille	—N/a		
21 June 2000 (Note: The 21 June 2000 concert in Paris was part of Fête de la Musique.)	Paris	France	Place de la République	—N/a		
22 June 2000 (Note: The 22 June 2000 concert in Hamburg was originally scheduled to take place on 13 June 2000, but was rescheduled due to Liam becoming ill.)	Hamburg	Germany	Alsterdorfer Sporthalle	—N/a		
30 June 2000 (Note: The 30 June 2000 concert in Werchter was part of Rock Werchter.)	Werchter	Belgium	Werchter Festival Grounds	—N/a		
2 July 2000 (Note: The 2 July 2000 concert in Turku was part of Ruisrock.)	Turku	Finland	Ruissalo	—N/a		
4 July 2000 (Note: The 4 July 2000 concert in Barcelona was originally scheduled to take place on 20 May 2000, but was rescheduled due to drummer Alan White having tendonitis.)	Barcelona	Spain	Pavelló de la Vall d'Hebron	—N/a		
6 July 2000 (Note: The 6 July 2000 concert in Kristiansand was part of Quart Festival.)	Kristiansand	Norway	Odderøya	—N/a		
8 July 2000	Dublin	Ireland	Lansdowne Road	Supergrass		
9 July 2000 (Note: The 9 July 2000 concert in Belfort was part of Eurockéennes.)	Belfort	France	Lac de Malsaucy	—N/a		
12 July 2000 (Note: The 12 July 2000 concert in Athens was part of Rockwave Festival.)	Athens	Greece	Antonis Tritsis Park	—N/a		
15 July 2000	Bolton	England	Reebok Stadium	Happy Mondays, Johnny Marr and the Healers	40,000 / 40,000	Sold Out
16 July 2000	Bolton	England	Reebok Stadium	Happy Mondays, Johnny Marr and the Healers	40,000 / 40,000	Sold Out
21 July 2000	London	England	Wembley Stadium	Happy Mondays, Doves	70,000 / 70,000	Sold Out
22 July 2000	London	England	Wembley Stadium	Happy Mondays, Doves	70,000 / 70,000	Sold Out
26 July 2000 (Note: The 26 July 2000 concert in Nyon was part of Paléo Festival. The band left the stage after "Gas Panic!" and did not return as several members of the crowd were throwing objects at the stage.)	Nyon	Switzerland	Plaine de l'Asse	—N/a		
29 July 2000	Edinburgh	Scotland	Murrayfield Stadium	Happy Mondays, Doves	56,000 / 56,000	Sold Out
4 August 2000 (Note: The 4 August 2000 concert in Benicàssim was part of Festival Internacional de Benicàssim.)	Benicàssim	Spain	Benicàssim Festival Grounds	—N/a		
6 August 2000 (Note: The 6 August 2000 concert in Odemira was part of MEO Sudoeste. The band left the stage during "Roll With It" and did not return as several members of the crowd were throwing objects at the stage.)	Odemira	Portugal	Zambujeira do Mar	—N/a		
8 August 2000 (Note: The 8 August 2000 concert in Budapest was part of Sziget Festival.)	Budapest	Hungary	Hajógyári Island	—N/a		
12 August 2000 (Note: The 12 August 2000 concert in Skanderborg was part of Skanderborg Festival.)	Skanderborg	Denmark	Bøgeskoven, Skanderborg	—N/a		
23 August 2000 (Note: The 23 August 2000 concert in Gijón was part of Gijón International Film Festival.)	Gijón	Spain	Plaza de Toros de El Bibio	—N/a		
25 August 2000 (Note: The 25 August 2000 concert in Reading was part of Reading Festival.)	Reading	England	Little John's Farm	—N/a		
26 August 2000 (Note: The 26 August 2000 concert in Glasgow was part of Gig on the Green.)	Glasgow	Scotland	Glasgow Green	—N/a		
28 August 2000 (Note: The 28 August 2000 concert in Leeds was part of Leeds Festival.)	Leeds	England	Temple Newsham Park	—N/a		

List of 2001 concerts
Date	City	Country	Venue	Opening Act	Attendance	Notes
14 January 2001	Rio de Janeiro	Brazil	Rock in Rio			
18 January 2001	Buenos Aires	Argentina	Hot Festival			
21 January 2001	Caracas	Venezuela	Caracas Pop Festival			
24 June 2001 (Note: Supporting Neil Young.)	Paris	France	Palais Omnisports de Paris-Bercy			
27 July 2001	Yuzawa	Japan	Fuji Rock Festival			
31 July 2001	Bangkok	Thailand	Impact, Muang Thong Thani			

=== Cancellations and rescheduled shows ===
Date	City	Country	Venue	Reason
4 May 2000	Charlotte	United States	Ovens Auditorium	
9 May 2000	Mexico City	Mexico	Palacio de los Deportes	
25 May 2000	Rennes	France	Le Liberte	Noel quits the tour
27 May 2000	Clermont-Ferrand	France	Coopérative	Noel quits the tour
28 May 2000	Metz	France	Le Galaxie Amphitheatre	Noel quits the tour
1 July 2000 (Note: The 1 July 2000 concert was part of the Roskilde Festival.)	Roskilde	Denmark	Darupvej	Death of nine people during Pearl Jam's set.
