= Roll It Over =

Roll It Over may refer to:

- "Roll It Over", a song by Derek and the Dominos, 1970
- "Roll It Over" (Oasis song), 2000
