= List of awards and nominations received by Oasis =

Oasis awards and nominations
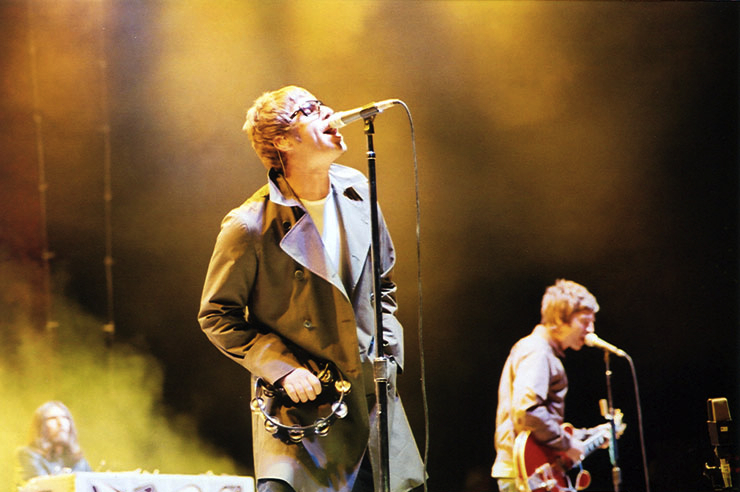
- Liam Gallagher (left) and guitarist brother Noel Gallagher of Oasis, with live keyboardist Jay Darlington in background.
Awards and nominations
| Award | Wins | Nominations |
| Brit | 7 | 17 |
| Grammy | 0 | 3 |
| Ivor Novello | 2 | 3 |
| MTV Asia | 0 | 1 |
| MTV Europe | 4 | 4 |
| MTV Japan | 1 | 4 |
| NME | 17 | 26 |
| Q | 9 | 19 |
| Top of the Pops Awards | 1 | 1 |
| Vodafone Live Music Awards | 1 | 1 |
| Mercury Prize | 0 | 2 |
| NME Awards USA | 0 | 2 |
| Silver Clef Awards | 1 | 1 |
| UK Video Music Awards | 2 | 4 |
| UK Festival Awards | 0 | 1 |
| Music for the Mases community VS | 1 | 1 |
| TVZ Awards | 1 | 1 |
| World Music Awards | 3 | 3 |

Totals (Note: Certain award groups do not simply award one winner. They acknowledge several different recipients, have runners-up, and have third place. Since this is a specific recognition and is different from losing an award, runner-up mentions are considered wins in this award tally. For simplification and to avoid errors, each award in this list has been presumed to have had a prior nomination.)
- Wins: 50
- Nominations: 92

Oasis are a britpop band formed in Manchester by Liam Gallagher (vocals), Paul Arthurs (guitar), Paul McGuigan (bass) and Tony McCarroll (drums), who were soon joined by Liam's older brother Noel Gallagher (guitar, vocals).

The band released seven studio albums: Definitely Maybe (1994), (What's the Story) Morning Glory? (1995), Be Here Now (1997), Standing on the Shoulder of Giants (2000), Heathen Chemistry (2002), Don't Believe the Truth (2005) and Dig Out Your Soul (2008). The band's second studio album, (What's the Story) Morning Glory, has been their highest-selling album to date, with over 22 million copies sold worldwide the album was also voted Best Album of 30 Years at the 2010 Brit Awards.

== Brit Awards ==
The Brit Awards are the British Phonographic Industry's annual pop music awards. Oasis have received seven awards from eighteen nominations.

| Year | Nominee / work | Award | Result |
|---|---|---|---|
| 1995 | Oasis | British Newcomer | Won |
| 1995 | Oasis | British Group | Nominated |
| 1995 | Definitely Maybe | British Album of the Year | Nominated |
| 1995 | "Live Forever" | British Single of the Year | Nominated |
| 1996 | Oasis | British Group | Won |
| 1996 | (What's the Story) Morning Glory? | British Album of the Year | Won |
| 1996 | "Wonderwall" | British Video of the Year | Won |
| 1996 | "Wonderwall" | British Single of the Year | Nominated |
| 1996 | "Roll with It" | British Single of the Year | Nominated |
| 1997 | "Don't Look Back in Anger" | British Single of the Year | Nominated |
| 1998 | Oasis | British Group | Nominated |
| 1998 | Be Here Now | British Album of the Year | Nominated |
| 1998 | "D'You Know What I Mean?" | British Video of the Year | Nominated |
| 2003 | Oasis | British Group | Nominated |
| 2006 | Oasis | British Rock Act | Nominated |
| 2006 | Oasis | British Live Act | Nominated |
| 2007 | Oasis | Outstanding Contribution to Music | Won |
| 2010 | (What's the Story) Morning Glory? | British Album of 30 Year | Won |
| 2026 | Noel Gallagher | Songwriter of the Year | Won |

== Grammy Awards ==
The Grammy Awards are presented annually by the National Academy of Recording Arts and Sciences of the United States for outstanding achievements in the record industry. Oasis have received three nominations.

| Year | Nominee / work | Award | Result |
|---|---|---|---|
| 1997 | "Wonderwall" | Best Rock Vocal Performance by a Duo or Group | Nominated |
| 1997 | "Wonderwall" | Best Rock Song | Nominated |
| 1999 | "All Around the World" | Best Music Video, Short-Form | Nominated |

== Hong Kong Top Sales Music Awards ==
| Year | Nominee / work | Award | Result |
|---|---|---|---|
| 2002 | Heathen Chemistry | Top 10 Best Selling Foreign Albums | Won |

== Ivor Novello Awards ==
The Ivor Novello Awards, named after the Cardiff born entertainer Ivor Novello, are awards for songwriting and composing. Oasis have received two award from three nominations.

| Year | Nominee / work | Award | Result |
|---|---|---|---|
| 1995 | Oasis | Songwriters of the Year | Won |
| 1996 | Noel Gallagher | Songwriters of the Year | Won* |
| 2003 | "Stop Crying Your Heart Out" | Best Song Musically and Lyrically | Nominated |

- Refused because it was to be shared with Damon Albarn

== Juno Awards ==
The Juno Awards are presented annually to Canadian musical artists and bands to acknowledge their artistic and technical achievements in all aspects of music. New members of the Canadian Music Hall of Fame are also inducted as part of the awards ceremonies.

| Year | Nominee / work | Award | Result |
|---|---|---|---|
| 1997 | (What's the Story) Morning Glory? | Best Selling Album (Foreign or Domestic) | Nominated |

== Mercury Prizes ==
The Mercury Prize is an annual music prize awarded for the best album from the United Kingdom or Ireland. Oasis have received two nominations.

| Year | Nominee / work | Award | Result |
|---|---|---|---|
| 1995 | Definitely Maybe | Mercury Prize | Nominated |
| 1996 | (What's the Story) Morning Glory? | Mercury Prize | Nominated |

== MTV Asia Awards ==
The biannual MTV Asia Awards is the Asian equivalent of the Australian MTV Australia Awards. Oasis have received one nomination.

| Year | Nominee / work | Award | Result |
|---|---|---|---|
| 2006 | Oasis | Favourite Rock Act | Nominated |

== MTV Europe Music Awards ==
The MTV Europe Music Award were established in 1994 by MTV Europe to celebrate the most popular music videos in Europe. Oasis have received four awards from eight nominations.

| Year | Nominee / work | Award | Result |
|---|---|---|---|
| 1994 | Oasis | Local Hero Award – UK | Won |
| 1995 | Oasis | Best Rock | Nominated |
| 1996 | "Don't Look Back in Anger" | MTV Select | Nominated |
| 1996 | "Wonderwall" | Best Song | Won |
| 1996 | Oasis | Best Group | Won |
| 1996 | Oasis | Best Rock | Nominated |
| 1997 | Oasis | Best Group | Nominated |
| 1997 | Oasis | Best Rock | Won |

== MTV Video Music Awards Japan ==
The MTV Video Music Awards Japan were established in 2002 by MTV Japan. Oasis have received one award from four nominations.

| Year | Nominee / work | Award | Result |
|---|---|---|---|
| 2002 | Oasis | Best Live Act | Won |
| 2006 | "Lyla" | Best Group Video | Nominated |
| 2006 | "Lyla" | Best Video of the Year | Nominated |
| 2006 | Don't Believe the Truth | Best Album of the Year | Nominated |

== NME Awards ==
The NME Awards are an annual music awards show, founded by the music magazine NME. Oasis have received Seventeen awards from twenty-six nominations.

| Year | Nominee / work | Award | Result |
|---|---|---|---|
| 1995 | "Live Forever" | Single of the Year | Won |
| 1995 | Definitely Maybe | Album of the Year | Won |
| 1995 | Oasis | Best New Band | Won |
| 1996 | "Wonderwall" | Best Single | Won |
| 1996 | (What's the Story) Morning Glory? | Best Album | Won |
| 1996 | Oasis | Best Live Band | Won |
| 1996 | Oasis | Best Band | Won |
| 1997 | Knebworth | Best Musical Event | Won |
| 1997 | Oasis | Band of the Year | Won |
| 2003 | Oasis | Best Live Band | Nominated |
| 2003 | Oasis | Best UK Band | Won |
| 2003 | Oasis | Artist of the Year | Won |
| 2005 | Definitely Maybe | Best Music DVD | Won |
| 2006 | "The Importance of Being Idle" | Best Video | Won |
| 2006 | "The Importance of Being Idle" | Best British Track | Nominated |
| 2006 | Don't Believe the Truth | Best Album | Nominated |
| 2006 | Oasis | Best British Band | Nominated |
| 2006 | Oasis | Best Live Act | Nominated |
| 2007 | Oasis | Best British Band | Nominated |
| 2009 | Oasis | Best British Band | Won |
| 2009 | Oasis | Best Live Band | Nominated |
| 2009 | Oasis | Best Band Blog | Won |
| 2009 | Dig Out Your Soul | Best Album | Nominated |
| 2009 | "The Shock of the Lightning" | Best Video | Nominated |
| 2017 | "Oasis: Supersonic" | Best Music Film | Won |
| 2017 | Be Here Now | Best Reissue | Won |

== NME Awards USA ==
The NME Awards USA are awarded annually by music magazine NME. Oasis have received two nominations.

| Year | Nominee / work | Award | Result |
|---|---|---|---|
| 2008 | "Lord Don't Slow Me Down" | Best Video | Nominated |
| 2008 | Oasis | Best International Band | Nominated |

== Q Awards ==
The Q Awards are the UK's annual music awards run by the music magazine Q. Oasis have received nine awards from nineteen nominations.

| Year | Nominee / work | Award | Result |
|---|---|---|---|
| 1994 | Oasis | Best New Act | Won |
| 1995 | Oasis | Best Live Act | Won |
| 1996 | Oasis | Best Act in the World Today | Won |
| 1997 | Oasis | Best Act in the World Today | Won |
| 1997 | Oasis | Best Live Act | Nominated |
| 1997 | Be Here Now | Best Album | Nominated |
| 2000 | Oasis | Best Live Act | Won |
| 2002 | "The Hindu Times" | Best Single | Nominated |
| 2002 | Oasis | Best Live Act | Nominated |
| 2002 | Oasis | Best Act in the World Today | Nominated |
| 2005 | "The Importance of Being Idle" | Best Video | Nominated |
| 2005 | "The Importance of Being Idle" | Best Track | Nominated |
| 2005 | Don't Believe the Truth | Best Album | Won |
| 2005 | Oasis | Best Live Act | Nominated |
| 2005 | Oasis | Best Act in the World Today | Nominated |
| 2005 | Oasis | People's Choice Award | Won |
| 2006 | Oasis | Best Act in the World Today | Won |
| 2006 | Noel Gallagher | Classic Songwriter Award | Won |
| 2008 | Oasis | Best Act in the World Today | Nominated |
| 2009 | Oasis | Best Live Act | Nominated |
| 2009 | Oasis | Best Act in the World Today | Nominated |

== Rock and Roll Hall of Fame ==
The Rock and Roll Hall of Fame is a museum located on the shores of Lake Erie in downtown Cleveland, Ohio, United States, dedicated to the recording history of some of the best-known and most influential artists, producers, and other people who have influenced the music industry.

| Year | Nominee / work | Award | Result |
|---|---|---|---|
| 2024 | Oasis | Performer | Nominated |
| 2025 | Oasis | Performer | Nominated |
| 2026 | Oasis | Performer | Inducted |

== Silver Clef Awards ==
Oasis have received one award from one nomination.

| Year | Nominee / work | Award | Result |
|---|---|---|---|
| 2008 | Oasis | Silver Clef | Won |

== Top of the Pops Awards ==
The Top of the Pops Awards were awarded annually by television programme Top of the Pops. Oasis have received one award from one nomination.

| Year | Nominee / work | Award | Result |
|---|---|---|---|
| 2002 | Oasis | Best Rock Act | Won |

== TVZ Awards ==
The TVZ Awards was established in 1994 to honor the best in Brazilian music. In 1998, the award changed its name to Multishow Brazilian Music Awards.

| Year | Nominee / work | Award | Result | Ref. |
|---|---|---|---|---|
| 1996 | Oasis | International New Artist | Won | |

== Vodafone Live Music Awards ==
The Vodafone Live Music Awards are awarded annually by mobile telecommunications company Vodafone. Oasis have received one award from one nomination.

| Year | Nominee / work | Award | Result |
|---|---|---|---|
| 2007 | Morning Glory – An Album Under Review | Best Live Music DVD | Won |

== UK Music Video Awards ==
Oasis have received two awards from four nominations.

| Year | Nominee / work | Award | Result |
|---|---|---|---|
| 2009 | "Falling Down" | Best Cinematography In A Video | Nominated |
| 2009 | "Falling Down" | Best Editing in a Video | Won |
| 2009 | "Falling Down" | Best Rock Video | Nominated |
| 2009 | 'Dig Out Your Soul' | The Innovation Award | Won |

== UK Festival Awards ==
The UK Festival Awards are an annual music awards show, Oasis have received one nomination.

| Year | Nominee / work | Award | Result |
|---|---|---|---|
| 2009 | Oasis | Best Headline Performance | Nominated |

== Webby Awards ==
A Webby Award is an award for excellence on the Internet presented annually by The International Academy of Digital Arts and Sciences.

| Year | Nominee / work | Award | Result |
|---|---|---|---|
| 2009 | Dig Out Your Soul - In The Streets | Online Film & Video - Music | Nominated |

== World Music Awards ==
| Year | Nominee / work | Award | Result | Ref. |
|---|---|---|---|---|
| 1997 | Oasis | World's Best Selling Rock Group | Won | |
| 1997 | Oasis | World's Best Selling Alternative Group | Won | |
| 1997 | Oasis | World's Best Selling British Artist | Won | |

== Recognition ==
In July 2009, "Wonderwall" was voted #12 in Triple J Hottest 100 of All Time.
