= Who Feels Love? =

2000 single by Oasis

Single by Oasis

from the album Standing on the Shoulder of Giants
- B-side: "One Way Road"; "Helter Skelter"
- Released: 17 April 2000
- Genre: Psychedelic rock
- Length: 5:44
- Label: Big Brother
- Songwriter: Noel Gallagher
- Producers: Mark Stent; Noel Gallagher

Oasis singles chronology
"Where Did It All Go Wrong?" (2000)	"Who Feels Love?" (2000)	"Sunday Morning Call" (2000)

Music video
- "Who Feels Love?" on YouTube

"Who Feels Love?" is a song by English rock band Oasis, written by the band's lead guitarist Noel Gallagher. It served as the second single from their fourth studio album, Standing on the Shoulder of Giants (2000). The song peaked at number four on the UK Singles Chart (their first not to reach the top three since 1994's "Cigarettes & Alcohol", not counting unofficial release "Wibbling Rivalry") and entered the top 20 in Ireland, Italy, and Spain.

== Background ==
Like many of the songs on Standing on the Shoulder of Giants, "Who Feels Love?" was influenced by songwriter Noel Gallagher's newfound sobriety. This track specifically was written following a trip Noel took to Thailand with his then-wife Meg Mathews. In an interview with The Guardian before the album was released, Noel said: "We'd never really hung out together sober... We met through drugs. Our relationship was surrounded by drugs...When I decided I was going to come off it and change the way I lived, in the beginning it was, like - how's that gonna be with our relationship. Am I still gonna like her?" The song was subsequently written following the couple's visit to a temple that helped to assuage his concerns about the viability of the couple's relationship.

Gallagher stated that the song being directly influenced by the Beatles, in particular George Harrison's sitar tracks from the mid 60's. He also admitted to copying the descending guitar riff in the bridge of "Who Feels Love?" from the main guitar riff in "Dear Prudence."

== Reception ==
Standing on the Shoulder of Giants was noted for its psychedelic feel, and "Who Feels Love?" was held up as the most extreme example of this. Mark Stent was praised for his production on the song, creating a "trippy" feel like that found on Beatles songs such as "Rain". However, despite the acclaimed production, the song itself was not well received by the critics, with NME stating that the production "triumphs over any real sort of feeling ... pure mock Maharishi spirituality that not even Liam can salvage from the realm of self-parody".

== Music video ==
The song's music video was shot in Death Valley, California in December 1999.

== B-sides ==
One of the B-sides is a cover of the Beatles' "Helter Skelter". It was played live during the Standing on the Shoulder of Giants Tour of 2000. Paul Weller recorded a version of B-side "One Way Road" for his covers-album Studio 150 in 2004. The Weller version was subsequently used as the theme tune to Jack Dee's sitcom Lead Balloon.

== Track listings ==
All songs were written by Noel Gallagher except "Helter Skelter", written by Lennon–McCartney. "Helter Skelter" was recorded during the sessions for Be Here Now and was produced by Owen Morris.

UK CD and 12-inch single

1. "Who Feels Love?" – 5:45
2. "One Way Road" – 4:03
3. "Helter Skelter" – 5:51
- The CD also contains the music video to "Who Feels Love?"

UK 7-inch and cassette single

1. "Who Feels Love?" – 5:45
2. "One Way Road" – 4:03

Japanese CD single

1. "Who Feels Love?" – 5:44
2. "One Way Road" – 4:03
3. "Gas Panic!" (demo) – 6:39
- The demo for "Gas Panic!" was only ever officially released in Japan before being included on a free Oasis CD issued with The Sunday Times on 23 June 2002.

== Personnel ==
Oasis

- Liam Gallagher – lead vocals, tambourine
- Noel Gallagher – electric guitars, acoustic guitars, backing vocals
- Alan White – drums, percussion

Additional musicians

- Paul Stacey – keyboards, Minimoog, bass, backwards guitar

== Charts ==
=== Weekly charts ===
Chart (2000)	Peak position
Europe (Eurochart Hot 100)	19
Germany (GfK)	94
Iceland (Íslenski Listinn Topp 40)	31
Ireland (IRMA)	15
Italy (FIMI)	16
Italy Airplay (Music & Media)	1
Netherlands (Single Top 100)	57
Scottish Singles Sales (Official Charts)	3
Spain (Promusicae)	7
Switzerland (Schweizer Hitparade)	66
UK Singles (Official Charts)	4
UK Indie (Official Charts)	1

=== Year-end charts ===
Chart (2000)	Position
UK Singles (OCC)	154

== Release history ==
Region	Date	Format(s)	Label(s)	Ref.
United Kingdom	17 April 2000	7-inch vinyl; CD; cassette	Big Brother	
Japan	19 April 2000	CD	Epic	
