= Familiar to Millions =

- Vinyl cover (Note: Each format has a different colour for the cover art.)

Live album by Oasis
- Released: 13 November 2000
- Recorded: 21 July 2000
- Venue: Wembley Stadium, London
- Genre: Alternative rock; neo-psychedelia
- Length: 91:43
- Label: Big Brother
- Producer: Mark Stent, Paul Stacey

Oasis chronology
Standing on the Shoulder of Giants (2000)	Familiar to Millions (2000)	Heathen Chemistry (2002)

Oasis video chronology
...There and Then (1996)	Familiar to Millions (2000)	Definitely Maybe (2004)

Professional ratings
Aggregate scores
Source	Rating
Metacritic	60/100
Review scores
Source	Rating
AllMusic	3.5/5 stars
Encyclopedia of Popular Music	3/5 stars
Drowned in Sound	2/10
NME	9/10
Now	2/5 stars
Pitchfork	3.5/10
Q	3/5 stars

Familiar to Millions is a live album by English rock band Oasis, recorded at Wembley Stadium on 21 July 2000. It was released on 13 November 2000 by Big Brother Recordings, debuting at No. 5 in the UK charts with 57,000 copies sold in the first week. To date Familiar to Millions has sold around 378,000 copies in Britain alone (Platinum), about 70,000 copies in the United States and an estimated 1 million copies worldwide. The album was initially released simultaneously on six formats: DVD, VHS, double CD, double cassette, triple vinyl, and double MiniDisc.

== Track listing ==
All songs written by Noel Gallagher, except where noted. The disc division and track lengths below are taken from the double-CD edition of the album.

=== Disc one ===
1. "Fuckin' in the Bushes" (intro tape) – 3:04
2. "Go Let It Out" – 5:32
3. "Who Feels Love?" – 5:59
4. "Supersonic" – 4:30
5. "Shakermaker" – 5:13
6. "Acquiesce" – 4:18
7. "Step Out" (N. Gallagher, Stevie Wonder, Henry Cosby, Sylvia Moy) – 4:05
8. "Gas Panic!" – 8:01
9. "Roll with It" – 4:43
10. "Stand by Me" – 5:49

=== Disc two ===
1. "Wonderwall" – 4:34
2. "Cigarettes & Alcohol" – 6:53
3. "Don't Look Back in Anger" – 5:09
4. "Live Forever" – 4:52
5. "Hey Hey, My My" (Neil Young, Jeff Blackburn) – 3:45
6. "Champagne Supernova" – 6:31
7. "Rock 'n' Roll Star" – 6:19
8. "Helter Skelter" (John Lennon, Paul McCartney) – 6:32

=== The 'Highlights' version ===
(This version is on one CD. All songs are written by Noel Gallagher.)

1. "Go Let It Out" – 5:51
2. "Who Feels Love?" – 6:00
3. "Supersonic" – 4:30
4. "Shakermaker" – 5:13
5. "Acquiesce" – 4:07
6. "Gas Panic!" – 8:02
7. "Roll with It" – 4:44
8. "Wonderwall" – 4:34
9. "Cigarettes & Alcohol" – 6:53
10. "Don't Look Back in Anger" – 5:09
11. "Live Forever" – 4:53
12. "Champagne Supernova" – 6:31
13. "Rock 'n' Roll Star" – 6:24

== Video version (DVD/VHS/VCD) ==
As well as the first night, the DVD features the following:

- 45-minute documentary directed by Dick Carruthers was shot in and around Wembley by Grant Gee including backstage interviews and fans footage.
- Multi-camera angles on the track "Cigarettes & Alcohol".
- Live screen films for "Go Let It Out", "Supersonic", "Live Forever" and "Rock 'n' Roll Star".
- Complete Discography (inc. international releases) with audio clips and artwork.
- PCM 2.0 Stereo Sound.
- Dolby Digital 5.0 Surround Sound.
- CD-ROM element, which links to an exclusive page on the Oasis website with as-yet unseen photos and Songplayer module where fans can teach themselves to play "Live Forever".
- 'Tambourine' icon: click it and it takes you to and from the documentary in real time.

The UK VHS features the whole show and a 20-minute documentary (entitled "Mad Fer It") featuring exclusive interviews with Liam and Noel Gallagher. This documentary is unique to the VHS format.

== Audio version (CD/Vinyl/Cassette/MiniDisc) ==
- The CD features an extra bonus track, a cover of The Beatles' song "Helter Skelter", which was recorded at the Riverside Theatre, Milwaukee, WI, USA on 16 April 2000.
- A highlights CD was released on 1 October 2001 to celebrate Oasis' tenth anniversary as a band. "Fuckin' in the Bushes", "Step Out", "Stand by Me", "Hey Hey, My My", and "Helter Skelter" were all omitted.
- As Liam let the audience sing the choruses of "Wonderwall" and also changed the words to other parts of the song ("By now you should have somehow realised not to sniff glue" / "And all the lights that light the way are doin' me fuckin' 'ead in!" [an adlib due to the stage lights giving Liam a headache]) at the 21 July gig, the version on the various audio formats features a different vocal track to the original one recorded at Wembley. This also applies to Noel's backing vocals. Most of these overdubbed vocals were recorded at Oasis' gig at the Yokohama Arena, Kanagawa, Japan on 5 March 2000. Only one line ("I don't believe that anybody feels the way I do about you now") in the first verse is from the actual Wembley gig, as Liam failed to sing this line correctly in the Yokohama performance.
- The audio version of the album is also missing various bits of between-track banter.

== Promos ==
- A promo video of the Wembley version of "Gas Panic!" was distributed to music channels. The video featured visuals from throughout the gig and was slightly edited down to 6:57.
- "Gas Panic!" and "Hey Hey, My My" promo CDs were issued in Brazil to promote Oasis' appearance at the Rock in Rio festival on 14 January 2001. The 2-track CD of "Gas Panic!" included the album version and an edited version of the Wembley track, which was edited down to 4:28. The 1-track CD of "Hey Hey, My My" included the live version from Wembley.

== Artwork ==
Each of the eight different formats (plus the 2001 highlights CD) had a different colour for its own cover art. Below is a table featuring each colour for each format

Format	Colour
3× LP	Grey
2× CC	Yellow
2× CD	Red
2x MD	Light green
1× VHS	White
1x DVD	Light blue
2x VCD	White/light blue
1x CD	Violet

== Personnel ==
- Liam Gallagher – lead vocals, tambourine
- Noel Gallagher – lead guitar, backing vocals; lead vocals on "Don't Look Back in Anger", "Hey Hey, My My", "Step Out" and "Helter Skelter"
- Gem Archer – rhythm guitar
- Andy Bell – bass guitar
- Alan White – drums
- Zeb Jameson – keyboards

== Charts ==
=== Weekly charts ===
Chart (2000)	Peak position
Australian Albums (ARIA)	86
Austrian Albums (Ö3 Austria)	49
French Albums (SNEP)	51
German Albums (Offizielle Top 100)	57
Irish Albums (IRMA)	10
Italian Albums (FIMI)	22
Japanese Albums (Oricon)	13
Norwegian Albums (VG-lista)	38
Scottish Albums (OCC)	4
Swiss Albums (Schweizer Hitparade)	63
UK Albums (OCC)	5
US Billboard 200	182

Chart (2025)	Peak position
Belgian Albums (Ultratop Flanders)	101
Belgian Albums (Ultratop Wallonia)	198
German Rock & Metal Albums (Offizielle Top 100)	16

=== Year-end charts ===
Chart (2000)	Position
UK Albums (OCC)	97

== Certifications ==
Region	Certification	Certified units/sales
Album
Japan (RIAJ)	Gold	100,000^{^}
Mexico (AMPROFON)	2× Platinum	300,000
United Kingdom (BPI)	Platinum	300,000^{^}
Video
United Kingdom (BPI)	2× Platinum	100,000^{^}
^{^} Shipments figures based on certification alone.
