= Sunday Morning Call =

2000 single by Oasis

Single by Oasis

from the album Standing on the Shoulder of Giants
- B-side: "Carry Us All"; "Full On"
- Released: 3 July 2000
- Length: 5:12 (album version); 3:33 (radio edit)
- Label: Big Brother
- Songwriter: Noel Gallagher
- Producers: Mark Stent; Noel Gallagher

Oasis singles chronology
"Who Feels Love?" (2000)	"Sunday Morning Call" (2000)	"The Hindu Times" (2002)

Music video
- "Sunday Morning Call" on YouTube

"Sunday Morning Call" is a song by the English rock band Oasis, released as the third and final single from their fourth studio album, Standing on the Shoulder of Giants. It reached number four in the United Kingdom, number five in Italy, and number 20 in Ireland.

== Release and reception ==
The song was released as the third and final single from the album on 3 July 2000, peaking at number four on the UK Singles Chart, number five in Italy, and number 20 in Ireland. It was written and sung by Noel Gallagher.

Though the song has the same anthemic feel that popularised many Oasis songs, and departs from the psychedelic feel of Standing on the Shoulder of Giants, which had been poorly received by critics, it received a mixed critical reception. NME described it as "a dreary thing indeed", whereas Allmusic described it as a "self-consciously mature departure from the group's usual ebullience ... a deliberately mellow, mid-tempo [song]".

"Sunday Morning Call" was included in the 2010 compilation album Time Flies... 1994–2009; however, the song was relegated to being a hidden track at the end of disc 2, being the only single to not be credited on the sleeve or be mentioned in the track listing. It was rumoured the reason for this is that Noel "hates" the song, as he stated in the audio commentary of the accompanying DVD. Noel confirmed this was in fact the case during an interview with Radio X in 2021 when he was asked why he disliked the song, to which Noel replied; "Because it’s shit. I hate that song. I hate it so much [that] I left it out of the Oasis singles album. That’s how much I fucking hate it. And I wrote it!".

"Full On" dates from 1997. It was played by the band during soundchecks in the Be Here Now Tour, for example at the G-Mex in Manchester on 14 December 1997.

== Music video ==
The music video is a take on the Jack Nicholson film One Flew Over the Cuckoo's Nest, with characters resembling McMurphy and Nurse Ratched. It was filmed in an old mental institution in Vancouver, British Columbia, Canada, and features Scottish actor James Cunningham.

== Track listings ==
UK CD and 12-inch single; Japanese CD single

1. "Sunday Morning Call"
2. "Carry Us All"
3. "Full On"

UK 7-inch and cassette single

1. "Sunday Morning Call"
2. "Carry Us All"

== Personnel ==
- Noel Gallagher – lead vocals, acoustic guitar, electric guitars, bass, keyboards, mellotron, synthesizer
- Alan White – drums, tambourine

== Charts ==
=== Weekly charts ===
Chart (2000)	Peak position
Europe (Eurochart Hot 100)	17
Ireland (IRMA)	20
Italy (FIMI)	5
Scottish Singles Sales (Official Charts)	3
UK Singles (Official Charts)	4
UK Indie (Official Charts)	1

=== Year-end charts ===
Chart (2000)	Position
UK Singles (OCC)	137

== Certifications ==
Region	Certification	Certified units/sales
United Kingdom (BPI)	Silver	200,000^{‡}
^{‡} Sales+streaming figures based on certification alone.

== Release history ==
Region	Date	Format(s)	Label(s)	Ref.
United Kingdom	3 July 2000	7-inch vinyl; 12-inch vinyl; CD; cassette	Big Brother	
Japan	5 July 2000	CD	Epic	
