= Where Did It All Go Wrong? =

2000 single by Oasis

Promotional single by Oasis

from the album Standing on the Shoulder of Giants
- Released: 27 March 2000
- Genre: Alternative rock
- Length: 4:26
- Label: Epic
- Songwriter: Noel Gallagher
- Producers: Mark "Spike" Stent, Noel Gallagher

Music video
- "Where Did It All Go Wrong?" on YouTube

"Where Did It All Go Wrong?" is a song and single by the English rock band Oasis, originally released on their 2000 album, Standing on the Shoulder of Giants.

Written by guitarist Noel Gallagher, it is one of two songs on Standing on the Shoulder of Giants that features him on lead vocals. In explaining why frontman Liam Gallagher did not sing the song, Noel claimed that: "[Vocally] Liam just couldn't get that one. The melody shifts quite a lot... Liam hasn't got that dynamism in his voice."

Noel stated that the song's lyrics are about a circle of friends that he was involved with at one time in his life, as well as being semi-autobiographical. Q Magazine stated that the song is "Easily a stand-out moment in the vast pantheon of Gallagher anthems... [an] evocative heartbreak record for the disaffected middle youth who is still a vulnerable youngster at the core..."

An early demo of the track featured flutist Charlotte Glasson, but when the album was re-recorded the flute part was not included. Glasson featured on "Gas Panic!" from the same album.

Although not released as a commercial single, the song was released as a radio-single in the United States, where the song received airplay but failed to chart widely due in part to no official release. However, it did peak at No. 49 on the Radio and Records Alternative chart.

== Music video ==
The video features Liam Gallagher being interviewed whilst Noel sings while reading a newspaper, looking at what is going on in the building opposite where he and the band are.

== Personnel ==
Oasis

- Noel Gallagher – lead vocals, lead guitars, rhythm guitar, acoustic guitar, bass, keyboards
- Alan White – drums, percussion

Additional

- Paul Stacey – additional acoustic guitar

== Charts ==
Chart (2000)	Peak position
US Alternative Top 50 (Radio & Records)	49
