= Standing on the Shoulder of Giants =

Studio album by Oasis
- Released: 28 February 2000
- Recorded: April–August 1999
- Studios: Olympic, Supernova Heights (London, England), Wheeler End (Buckinghamshire, England), Château de La Colle Noire (Montauroux, France)
- Genres: Alternative rock; psychedelic rock
- Length: 47:53
- Label: Big Brother
- Producers: Mark "Spike" Stent; Noel Gallagher

Oasis chronology
The Masterplan (1998)	Standing on the Shoulder of Giants (2000)	Familiar to Millions (2000)

Singles from Standing on the Shoulder of Giants
- 1. "Go Let It Out" Released: 7 February 2000; 2. "Who Feels Love?" Released: 17 April 2000; 3. "Sunday Morning Call" Released: 3 July 2000

Standing on the Shoulder of Giants is the fourth studio album by English rock band Oasis, released on 28 February 2000. It was the band's first album under their new record label Big Brother Recordings. In the year preceding the album's release, Alan McGee closed Creation Records, and Oasis had lost two founding members (Paul "Bonehead" Arthurs and Paul "Guigsy" McGuigan) and hired new producer Mark "Spike" Stent to replace Owen Morris.

The album marked a significant change from the Britpop scene to a modern psychedelic record complete with drum loops, samples, electric sitar, Mellotron, synthesisers and backward guitars, resulting in an album more experimental with electronica and heavy psychedelic rock influences. Songs such as "Go Let It Out", the psychedelic-influenced "Who Feels Love?", and the trip hop sounds on "Gas Panic!" departed from the band's earlier style. This album also marked the first time that lead singer Liam Gallagher contributed on songwriting ("Little James"), and this process continued for their subsequent albums, instead of relying solely on Noel Gallagher's songwriting as they had for the first three albums.

It is the 16th-fastest-selling album in UK chart history, selling over 310,000 copies in its first week. Standing on the Shoulder of Giants has been certified double platinum by the British Phonographic Industry and has sold around 208,000 copies in the US.

== Background ==
Following the completion of the Be Here Now Tour in 1998, Oasis took their first extended break from touring and recording since being signed by Creation Records in 1993. During this period, Noel Gallagher subsequently quit using cocaine and entered a period of relative sobriety for the first time since Oasis had entered the music industry. This led him to re-evaluate many of the relationships in his life that had been fostered and maintained by drug usage. As a result, many of the songs on the album and its subsequent B-sides, including "Gas Panic", "Where Did It All Go Wrong?", "Roll It Over", and "(As Long As They've Got) Cigarettes In Hell", focus thematically on changes experienced by the songwriter as a result of his newfound sobriety.

When the band reconvened at Château de La Colle Noire in France to begin recording the new collection of songs, Noel insisted on a no-drugs policy in the studio. This led to tensions within the group, specifically between Noel and two founding members of the band, rhythm guitarist Bonehead and bassist Guigsy. It was during this period that Noel wrote "Let's All Make Believe", a B-side to the "Go Let It Out" single. The intra-band tensions ultimately climaxed when Bonehead poured a bottle of wine on producer Spike Stent at 4 a.m. The guitarist then announced his departure from the group in the 10 July 1999 issue of NME, with Guigsy announcing his departure from the group the following day.

The album's title misquotes an expression by Sir Isaac Newton: "If I have seen further, it is by standing on the shoulders of giants". Noel saw the quote on the edge of a £2 coin while in a pub, and liked it so much he thought it would be a suitable name for Oasis' new album. He then wrote the name on the side of a cigarette packet while drunk, and upon awakening in the morning, he realised he had written "Standing on the Shoulder of Giants". He had also accidentally written "a bum title" on the packet instead of "album title".

Noel decided to drop the equipment used in the three previous albums and instead buy "loads of really weird pedals, old guitars, and small amps" as the lack of a deadline on the album allowed him to "take quite a few days just messing around" and experiment with new musical landscapes. Noel played nearly all the instruments on the album himself. He was aided by some additional musicians, including Paul Stacey, who contributed bass guitar on four tracks and keyboards and additional guitar on "Fuckin' in the Bushes"; Mark Coyle contributed sitar and 12-string acoustic guitar to "Little James"; Mark Feltham and Charlotte Glasson contributed harmonica and flute, respectively, to "Gas Panic!" Due to the departure of two founding band members (guitarist Bonehead and bassist Guigsy) while the album was still being recorded, their parts were re-recorded for legal reasons. The album features Noel and Liam Gallagher alongside drummer Alan White, who are also the only ones depicted on the sleeve of the album. Guitarist Gem Archer and bassist Andy Bell (Bonehead's and Guigsy's replacements, respectively) would be officially included in the band shortly after the album's release.

== Songs ==
Standing on the Shoulder of Giants features a heavy psychedelic influence, and some songs contain several samples. The opening track, "Fuckin' in the Bushes", features no vocals, but does include sampled quotes from Message to Love, a documentary film of the Isle of Wight Festival 1970. The festival's MC, Rikki Farr, is heard berating the crowd: "We put this festival on, you bastards, with a lot of love! We worked for one year for you pigs! And you wanna break our walls down and you wanna destroy it? Well you go to hell!" Two other festival observers in the film are also heard, one of whom is disgusted as "kids [are] running around naked, fucking in the bushes". The other, an old lady, Noel described as "some eccentric toff who just gets right into the weekend and smokes pot, so she obviously loses the plot". The song's drums are taken from the Jimi Hendrix Experience song "Little Miss Lover" (1968), rerecorded by White, and a guitar riff influenced by Led Zeppelin. The second track, "Go Let It Out", features a drum loop sampled from Johnny Jenkins's version of the Dr. John song "I Walk on Guilded Splinters" (1968), and an acoustic guitar line that's similar to the Beta Band's "Inner Meet Me".

"Who Feels Love?" is a psychedelic track featuring tablas, backwards guitars and sitars. Q's Andy Pemberton described it as an "updated take" on the Stone Roses' "Waterfall". "Gas Panic!" is a Beatles-influenced trip hop song that was inspired by the panic attacks Noel was having as he quit drugs in advance of the birth of his daughter Anaïs. "'Gas Panic!' was written while I was just lying in bed sweating, the usual five or six o'clock in the morning, thinking, f—ing hell, you know, is it all worth it?" he said. Noel's panic attacks inspired another song, the melodic, organ-driven "Where Did It All Go Wrong?". Noel sings it because, according to him, Liam struggled to sing the higher notes. Noel also sings on "Sunday Morning Call", a song "about certain real people who I know but who, obviously, remain nameless".

The album contains Liam Gallagher's first songwriting credit on an Oasis album, "Little James", a lullaby written as a tribute to his then-newborn son. Liam said that it took "all of three minutes" to write it. Noel described "Put Yer Money Where Yer Mouth Is" and "I Can See a Liar" as "the two shit tracks". The former was compared to the Doors' "Roadhouse Blues" (1970). He wanted to put "Let's All Make Believe" on the album, but Liam persuaded him to put "I Can See a Liar" on it due to it being a faster song likened to the Sex Pistols. The album ends with "Roll It Over", a song where Noel reflected on his celebrity with lyrics such as "Look around at all the plastic people that live without a care/Try to sit with me around my table but never bring a chair..." Oasis never performed the song live; Liam performed it for the first time at Knebworth in 2022.

== Album cover ==
The album's artwork features a photo of the Manhattan skyline taken from the rooftop of 500 Fifth Avenue (5th Ave/W 42nd St) in September 1999 by photographer Andrew MacPherson. Some famous buildings are visible including the Empire State Building in the foreground and the former World Trade Center in the background. To create the cover photo, MacPherson captured the same frame every half an hour in 18 hours during the whole day's course; the photos were digitally composited into the final picture. All of the singles released from this album contained artwork that was based on the album artwork; the shot used for "Go Let It Out" can be seen above one of the buildings at the front, which depicts five men playing football. This shot was taken from the roof of a football stadium, and the footballers from the car park were edited onto the rooftop on the final cover.

This album was the first Oasis artwork not to be created by Brian Cannon at Microdot.

== Release ==
The album title and track listing were announced in October 1999. Noel had originally told NME earlier that year that the title would be Where Did It All Go Wrong?.

Standing on the Shoulder of Giants was released in the UK on 28 February 2000 and spent 29 weeks on the UK album chart, debuting at number 1 with sales of 311,000 copies, dropping to number 2 with 49,000 copies, an 85% decline. It fell to number 6 in its third week, with a 56% decline in sales. In its fourth week the album fell out of the top ten, ending up at number 11. With 29 weeks on the charts, it has the fewest weeks for any Oasis studio album. It was the 26th biggest-selling album of 2000 in the UK.

Walmart chose not to sell the album, objecting to "Fuckin' in the Bushes" having profanity in the title.

Standing on the Shoulder of Giants debuted at number 24 on the Billboard 200 in the US, selling about 55,000 units in its first week, but sales slumped its second week and fell to No. 84 with a 64% sales drop. The album received a huge sales hike following the VH1 airing of the group's Behind the Music in April 2000, jumping from No. 194 to No. 113 on the Billboard 200 the week following the episode's airing. In March 2000, the IFPI certified Oasis for selling one million units of the album in Europe.

== Reception ==
Professional ratings
Review scores
Source	Rating
AllMusic	3/5 stars
Alternative Press	3/5
Entertainment Weekly	B
The Guardian	2/5 stars
Los Angeles Times	3/4 stars
Melody Maker	3.5/5 stars
NME	6/10
Q	4/5 stars
Rolling Stone	3/5 stars
Spin	3/5 stars

The album received mixed reviews from critics. The B-side to "Go Let It Out", "Let's All Make Believe", was featured in Q's top 500 lost tracks, who also said that if "Let's All Make Believe" were on the album, "it probably would have carried the album to another star". The magazine awarded the album four stars out of five, although in 2006, it included the record at number 46 in its list of the 50 worst albums ever made.

Several commentators acknowledged the band's growing maturity. Writing for AllMusic, Stephen Thomas Erlewine said that, while some songs stand among the band's best work from their first three albums, the rockers lack "the giddy rush or alluring sparkle of classic Oasis". He also praised the album's cohesion. NME's Keith Cameron described Standing on the Shoulder of Giants as a transitional album, one "to prove to themselves as much as anyone else that the desire still lay within". In Q, Andy Pamberton described the album as an "effective, modern psychedelic record that has dumped the bombast of yore and replaced it, for the most part, with some real emotion". More negatively, David Marchese of Spin magazine believed the album suffered not being a full-band effort, calling it their "murkiest" yet.

== Legacy ==
In a 2011 interview with Grantland, Noel disowned the album, stating that it should have never been made. He recalled that he "had no reason or desire to make music" and "just wrote songs for the sake of making an album". He also clarified that adding Archer and Bell allowed the band to split songwriting duties, as he felt he "could[n't] keep writing 20 songs every two years".

== Track listing ==
All tracks are written by Noel Gallagher, except "Little James" by Liam Gallagher.

Standing on the Shoulder of Giants track listing
No.	Title	Length
1.	"Fuckin' in the Bushes"	3:18
2.	"Go Let It Out"	4:39
3.	"Who Feels Love?"	5:44
4.	"Put Yer Money Where Yer Mouth Is"	4:27
5.	"Little James"	4:15
6.	"Gas Panic!"	6:08
7.	"Where Did It All Go Wrong?"	4:26
8.	"Sunday Morning Call"	5:12
9.	"I Can See a Liar"	3:13
10.	"Roll It Over"	6:30
Total length:		47:52

Japanese bonus track
No.	Title	Length
11.	"Let's All Make Believe"	3:51
Total length:		51:43

== Personnel ==
=== Oasis ===
- Liam Gallagher – lead vocals (tracks 2–6, 9, 10), tambourine
- Noel Gallagher – lead guitar, rhythm guitar, bass guitar, keyboards, Mellotron, backing vocals, lead vocals (tracks 7, 8), co-lead vocals (track 4), production
- Alan White – drums, percussion

=== Additional musicians ===
- Paul Stacey – keyboards, organ, synthesizer, Mellotron, additional lead guitar (track 1), backwards guitar (track 3), bass guitar (tracks 3, 6, 9, 10), additional acoustic guitar (track 7)
- P. P. Arnold and Linda Lewis – backing vocals (tracks 1, 4, 10)
- Mark Coyle – electric sitar (track 4), twelve-string acoustic guitar (track 5)
- Mark Feltham – harmonica (track 6)
- Charlotte Glasson – flute (track 6)

=== Production ===
- Mark "Spike" Stent – production, engineering
- Paul Stacey – engineering
- Jan "Stan" Kybert – programming, Pro Tools
- Wayne Wilkins – assistant engineering
- Paul "P-Dub" Walton – assistant engineering
- Aaron Pratley – assistant engineering
- Steve "Rambo" Robinson – studio assistant
- Howie Weinberg – mastering

== Charts ==
=== Weekly charts ===
Weekly chart performance for Standing on the Shoulder of Giants
Chart (2000)	Peak position
Australian Albums (ARIA)	6
Austrian Albums (Ö3 Austria)	3
Belgian Albums (Ultratop Flanders)	12
Belgian Albums (Ultratop Wallonia)	15
Canadian Albums (Billboard)	8
Dutch Albums (Album Top 100)	16
Finnish Albums (Suomen virallinen lista)	4
French Albums (SNEP)	6
German Albums (Offizielle Top 100)	5
Irish Albums (IRMA)	1
Italian Albums (FIMI)	1
Japanese Albums (Oricon)	4
New Zealand Albums (RMNZ)	8
Norwegian Albums (VG-lista)	4
Scottish Albums (Official Charts)	1
Spanish Albums (AFYVE)	8
Swedish Albums (Sverigetopplistan)	3
Swiss Albums (Schweizer Hitparade)	3
UK Albums (Official Charts)	1
UK Rock & Metal Albums (OCC)	1
US Billboard 200	24

=== Year-end charts ===
Year-end chart performance for Standing on the Shoulder of Giants
Chart (2000)	Position
Swiss Albums (Schweizer Hitparade)	84
UK Albums (OCC)	26

== Certifications ==
Certifications for Standing on the Shoulder of Giants
Region	Certification	Certified units/sales
Japan (RIAJ)	Platinum	200,000^{^}
South Korea	—	8,952
Spain (Promusicae)	2× Platinum	200,000^{^}
Sweden (GLF)	Gold	40,000^{^}
Switzerland (IFPI Switzerland)	Gold	25,000^{^}
United Kingdom (BPI)	2× Platinum	600,000^{^}
^{^} Shipments figures based on certification alone.
