= List of songs recorded by Oasis =

Songs recorded by English rock band

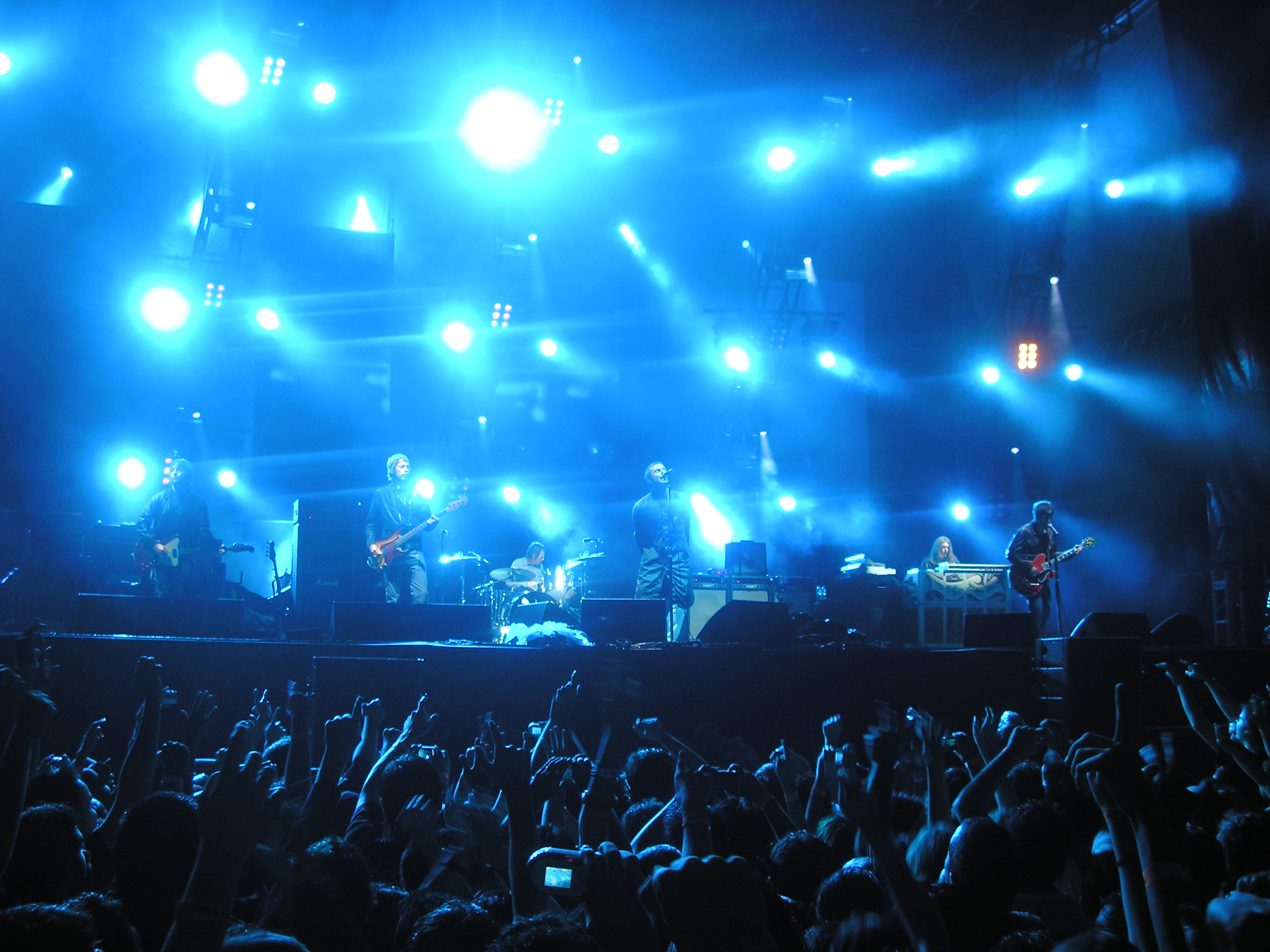
Oasis performing live in April 2009.

Oasis are an English rock band from Manchester. Formed in 1991, the group originally included vocalist Liam Gallagher, guitarist Paul "Bonehead" Arthurs, bassist Paul "Guigsy" McGuigan and drummer Tony McCarroll, although the quartet were soon joined by guitarist and second vocalist Noel Gallagher, older brother of Liam. They released their debut album Definitely Maybe in 1994, the material for which was entirely written by Noel Gallagher. Standalone single "Whatever" was issued later in the year, which was later co-credited to Neil Innes due to plagiarism. The band's second album (What's the Story) Morning Glory?, their first with new drummer Alan White, followed in 1995. All songs were again credited to Noel Gallagher, although opening track "Hello" was co-credited to Gary Glitter and Mike Leander due to its use of lyrics from Glitter's single "Hello, Hello, I'm Back Again". Oasis released their third album Be Here Now in 1997, which was their last to be written entirely by Noel Gallagher.

Bonehead and Guigsy both left Oasis in 1999, leaving the Gallagher brothers and White to record the band's next album alone. Standing on the Shoulder of Giants was released in 2000, featuring the first song written by Liam Gallagher for the band, "Little James". After adding new band members Gem Archer on guitar and Andy Bell on bass, the group released Heathen Chemistry in 2002, which featured songwriting contributions from all band members except White, including the first single not written by Noel Gallagher (Liam's "Songbird"). White left in 2004, with the Who touring drummer Zak Starkey taking his place as an unofficial guest member. Don't Believe the Truth was released in 2005, with both Gallaghers, Archer and Bell all writing songs for the album again. Noel Gallagher's "Who Put the Weight of the World on My Shoulders?" was contributed to the soundtrack for the film Goal! in 2005, and the following year "Lord Don't Slow Me Down" was released as a single from the film of the same name.

Oasis released their final album Dig Out Your Soul in 2008, which featured six songs written by Noel Gallagher, three by Liam Gallagher, and one each by Archer and Bell. After a confrontation with Liam backstage, Noel Gallagher announced his departure from Oasis in August 2009, with the remaining members forming Beady Eye together the following year.
Here are the 142 songs that have been recorded and released by Oasis.

== Songs (released) ==
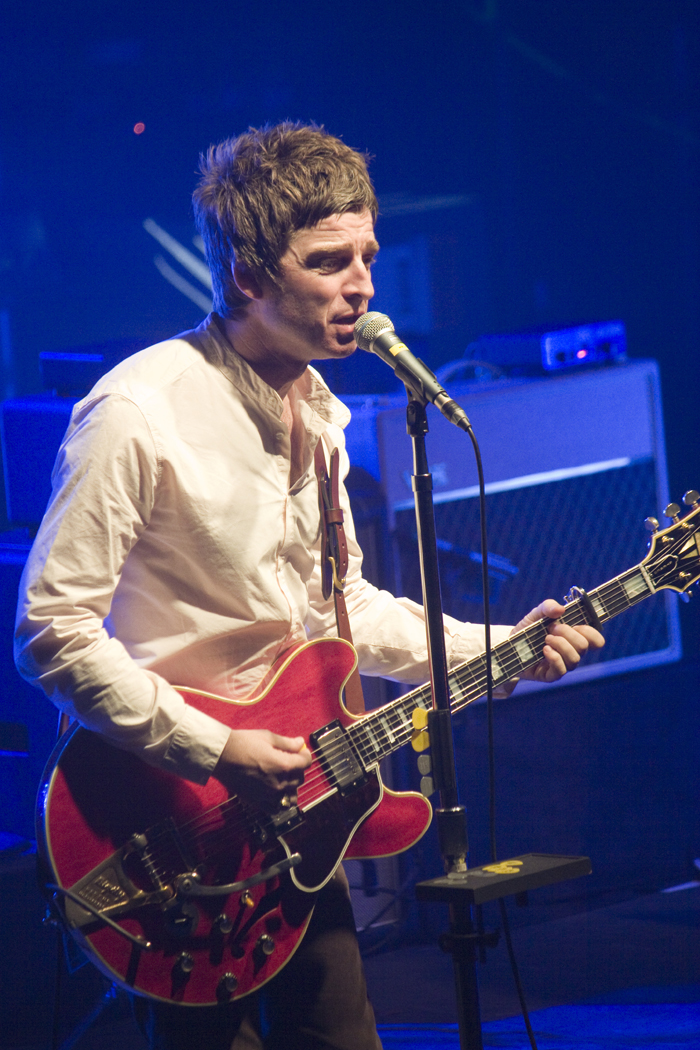
Guitarist and vocalist Noel Gallagher was the primary songwriter in Oasis, writing every original track released up until 2000.

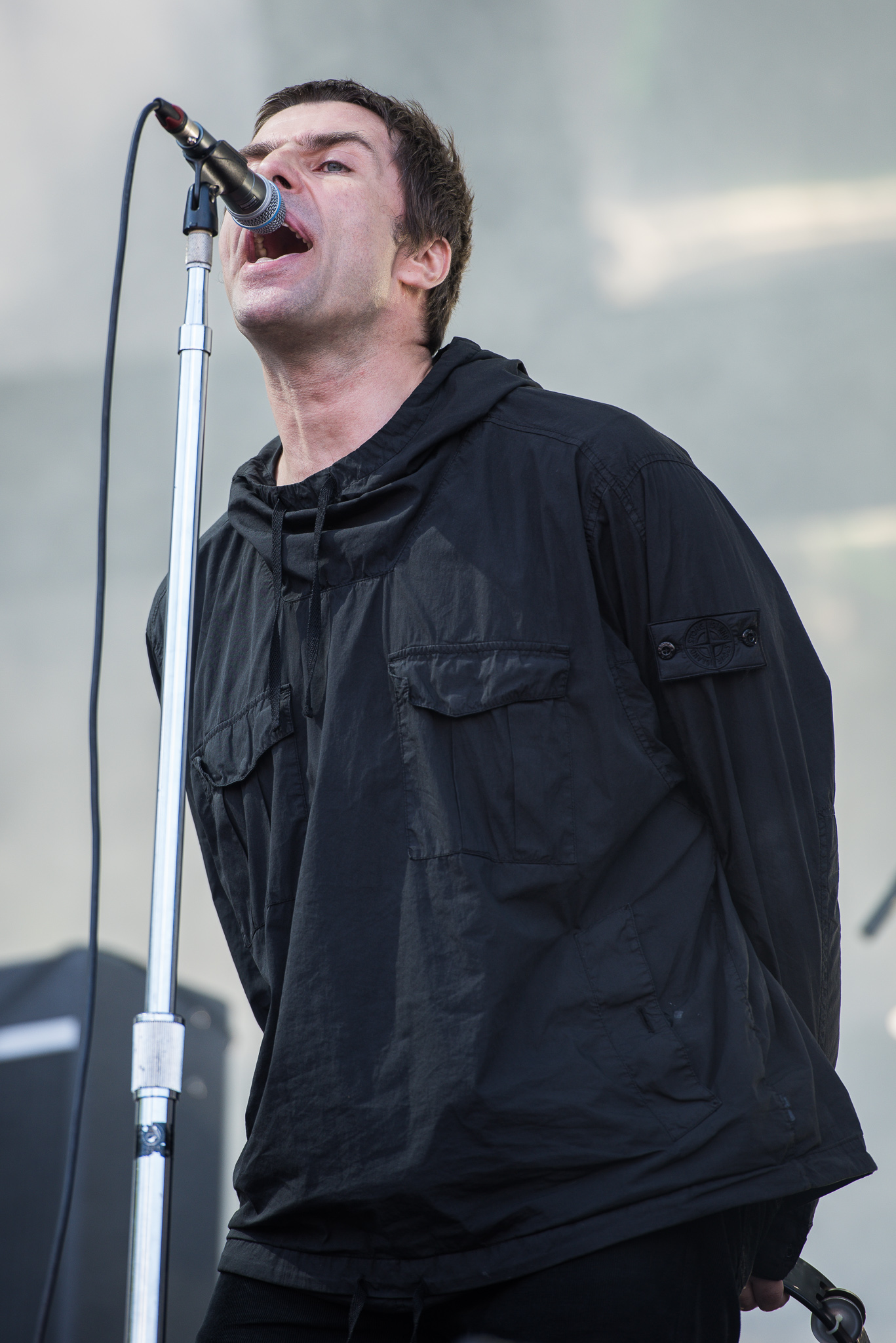
Frontman Liam Gallagher wrote a number of songs for Oasis starting in 2000, including singles "Songbird" and "I'm Outta Time".

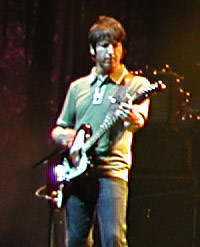
After joining the band in 1999, guitarist Gem Archer wrote and co-wrote six songs for Oasis – four album tracks and two B-sides.

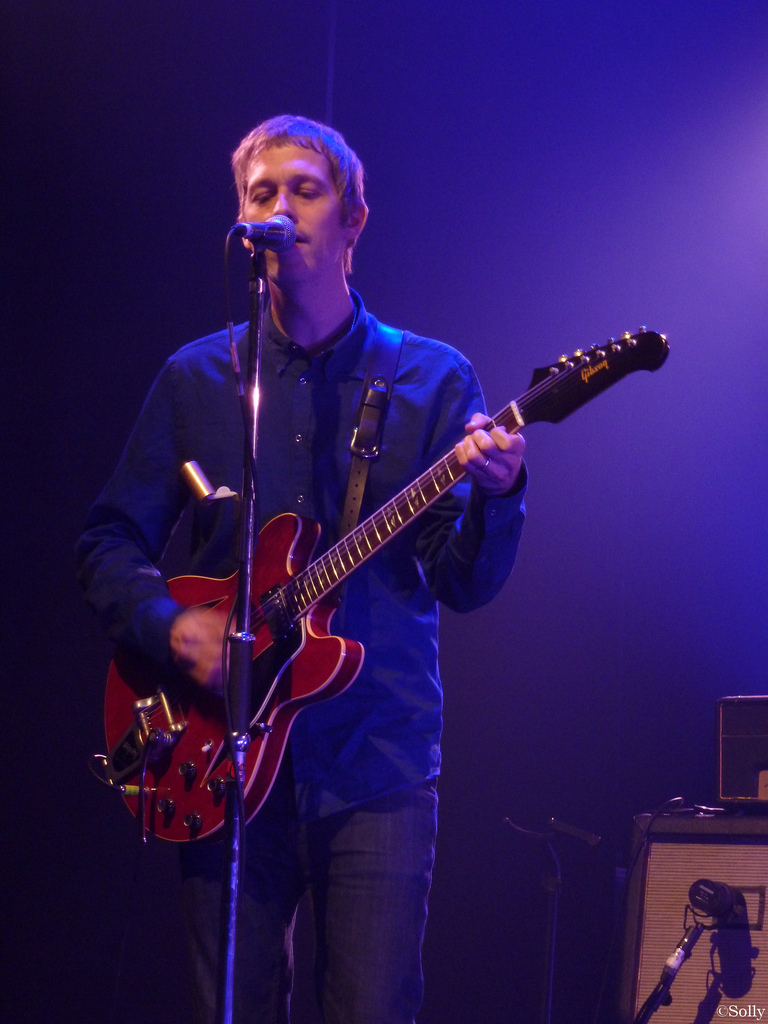
Andy Bell replaced original Oasis bassist Paul McGuigan in 1999 and wrote five songs for the band.

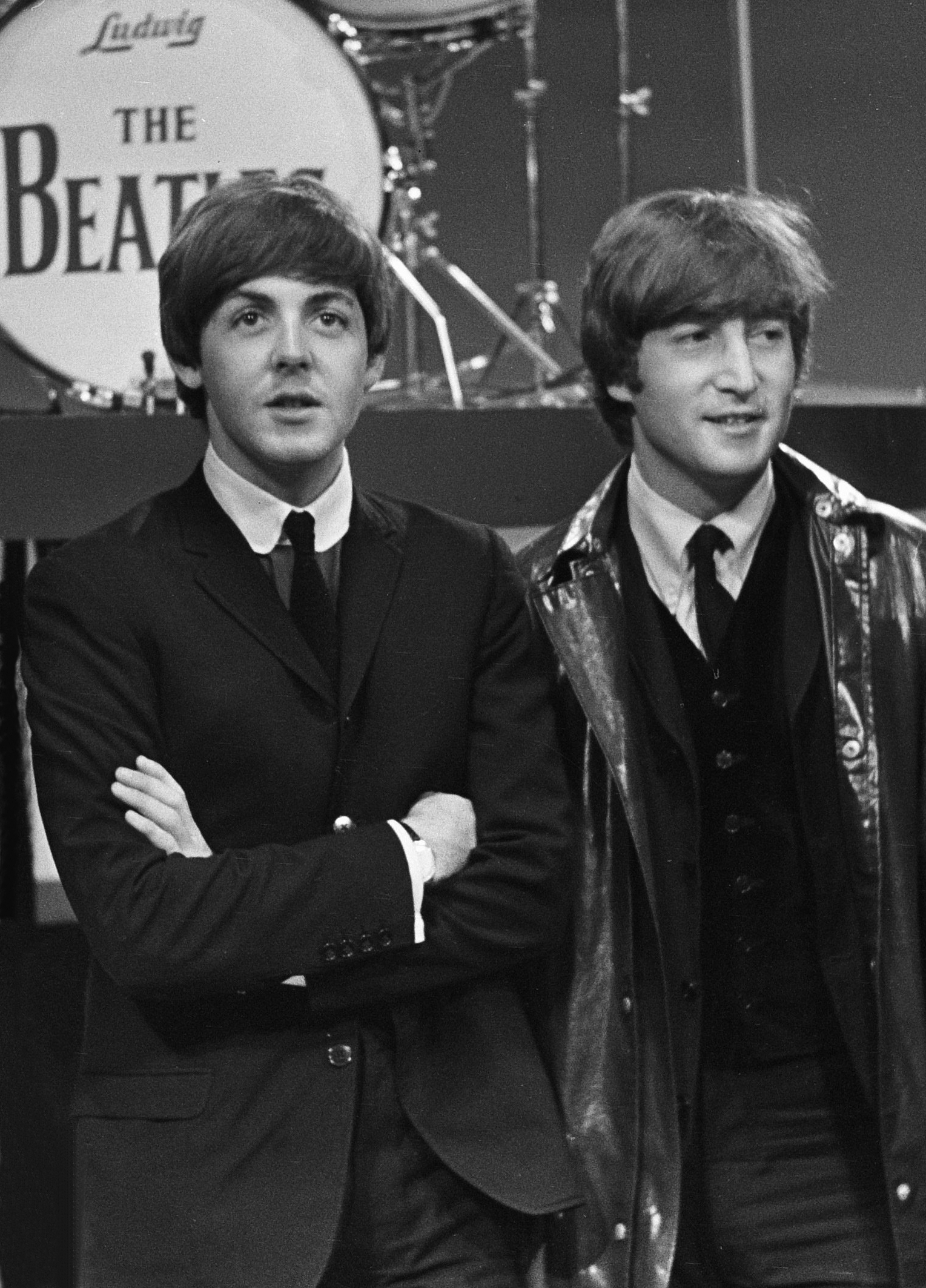
Oasis covered three Beatles songs that are credited to Paul McCartney (left) and John Lennon (right); "You've Got to Hide Your Love Away", "Helter Skelter", "I Am the Walrus" and Within You Without You written by George Harrison.

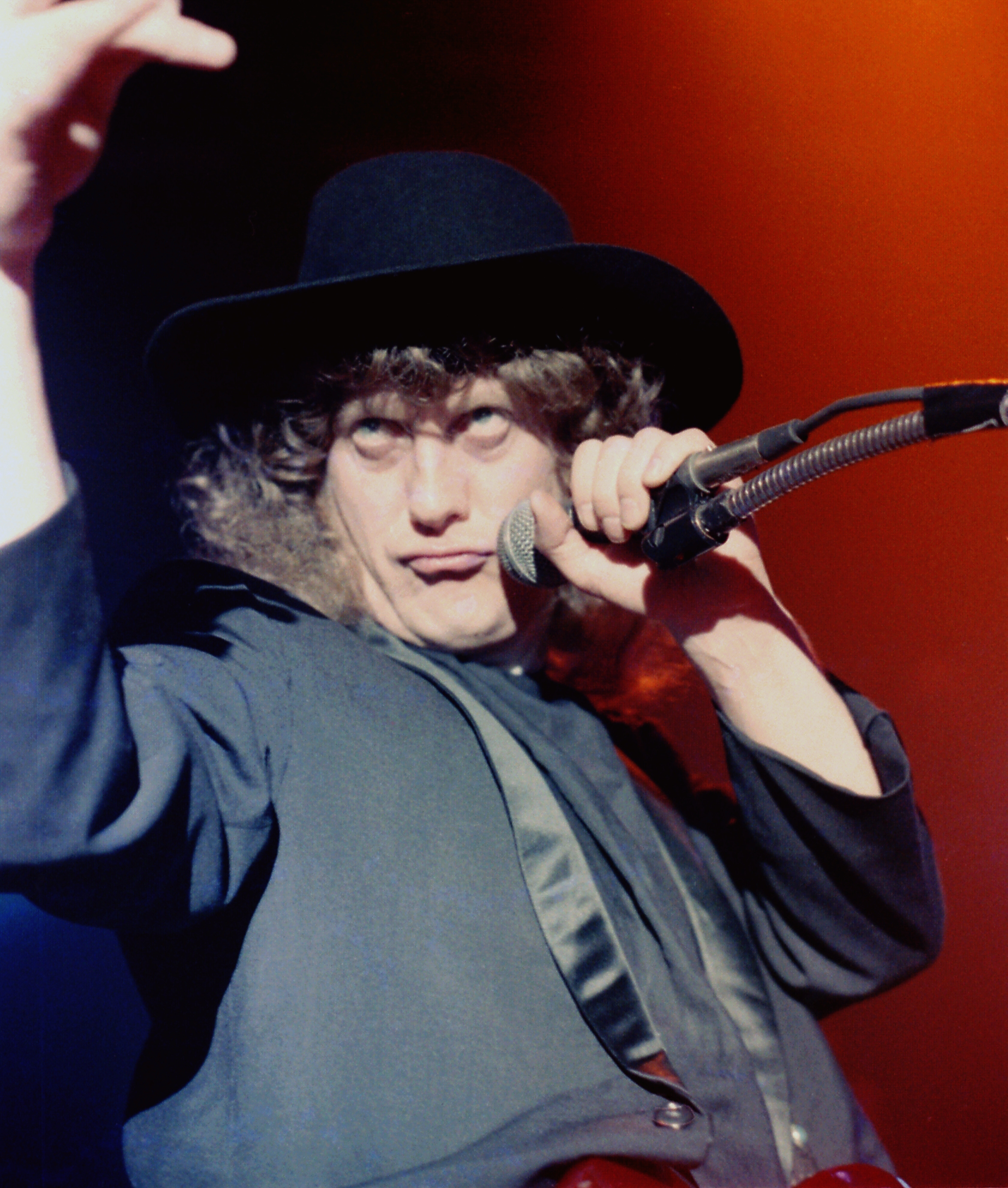
The band covered two Slade songs, "Cum On Feel the Noize" and "Merry Xmas Everybody", both of which were written by vocalist Noddy Holder (pictured) and bassist Jim Lea.

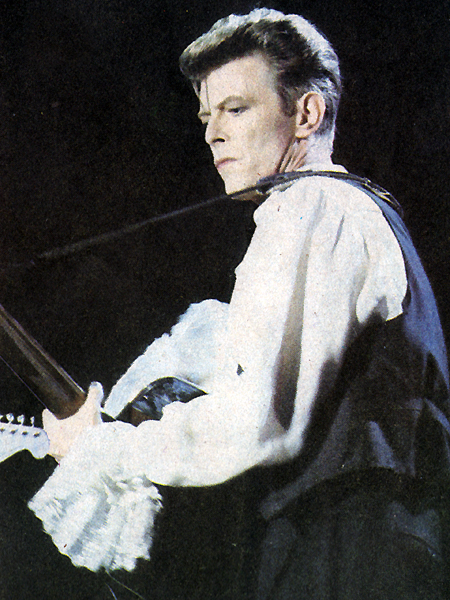
The band recorded a cover version of David Bowie's "Heroes" as a B-side for the 1997 single "D'You Know What I Mean?".

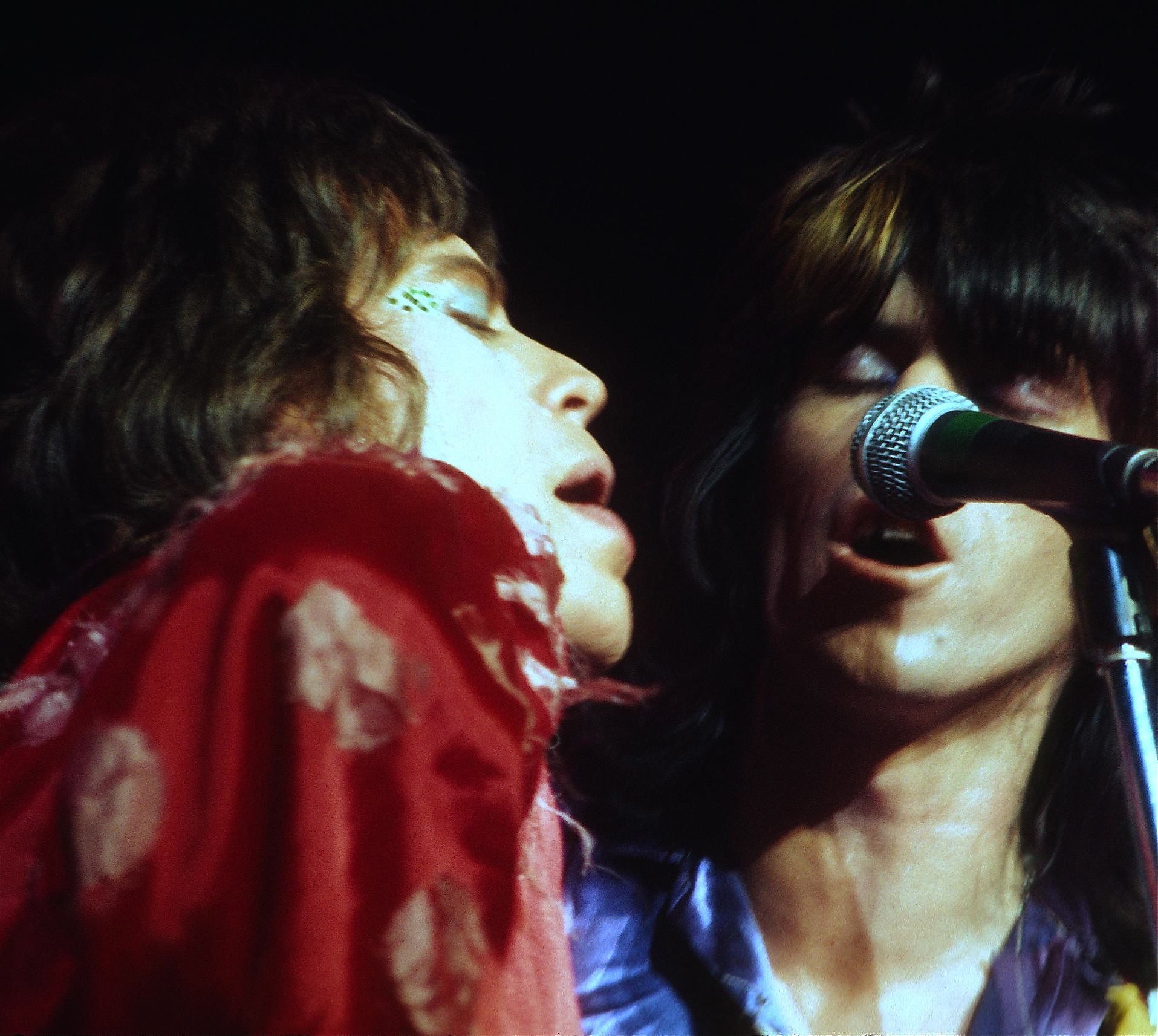
For the "All Around the World" single, Oasis covered the Rolling Stones song "Street Fighting Man", written by Mick Jagger (left) and Keith Richards (right).

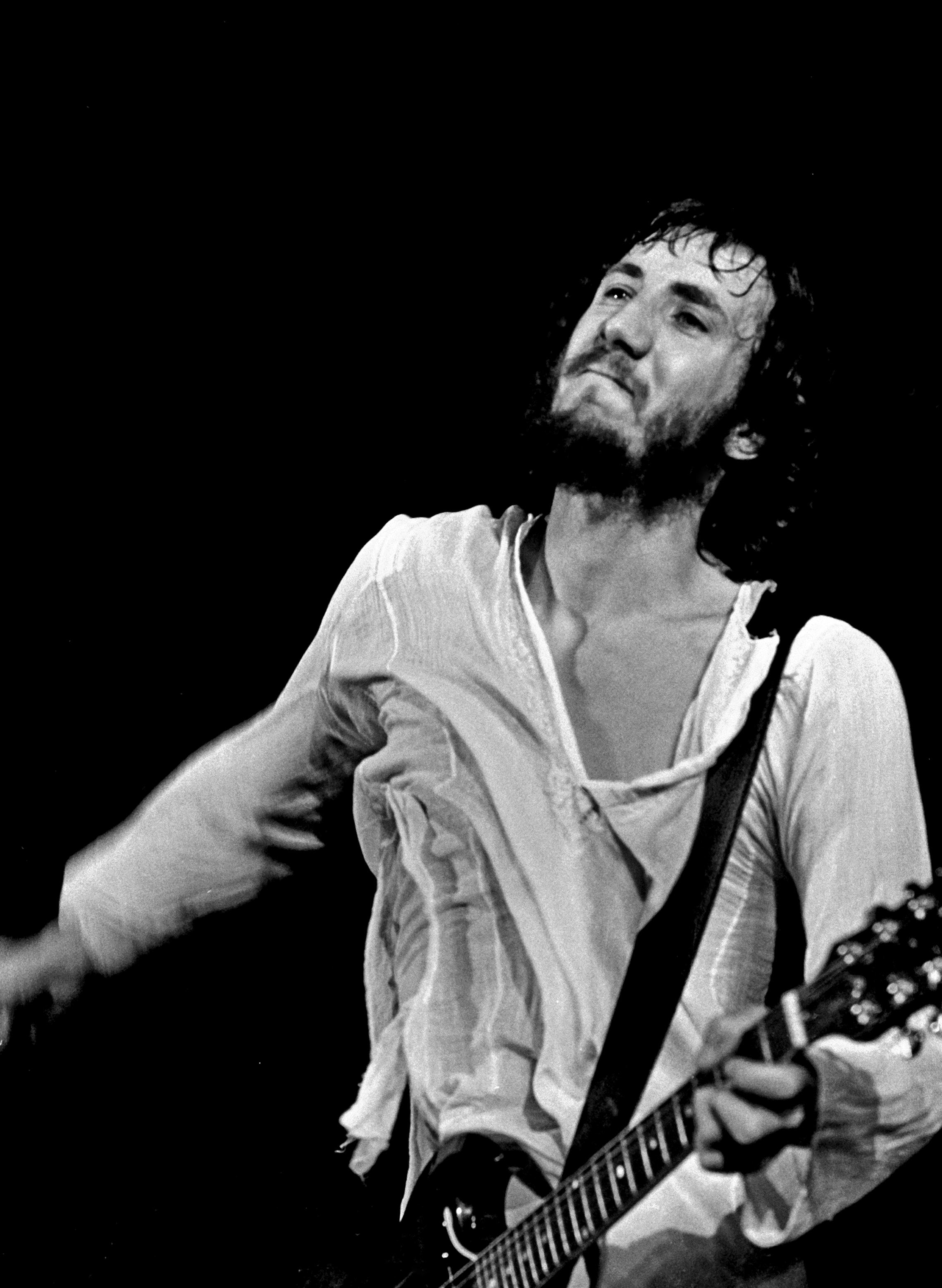
Oasis released a recording of the Who's "My Generation", written by guitarist Pete Townshend, as the B-side to "Little by Little/She Is Love" in 2002.

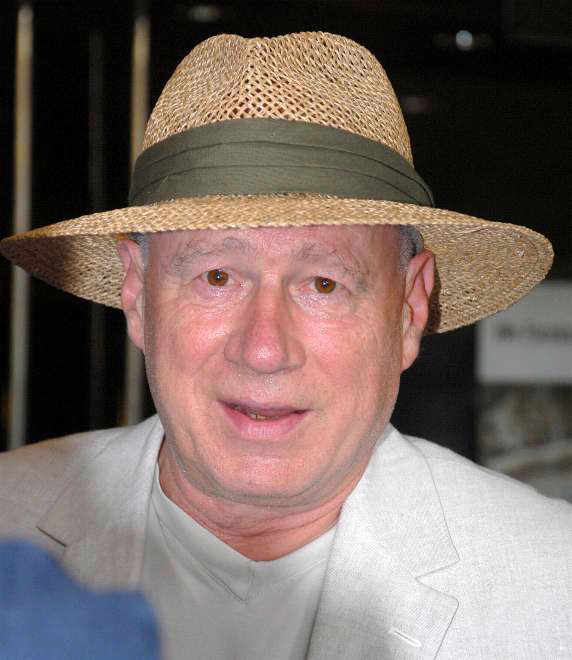
Neil Innes is credited is a co-writer of the 1994 single "Whatever", which contains elements of the track "How Sweet to Be an Idiot".

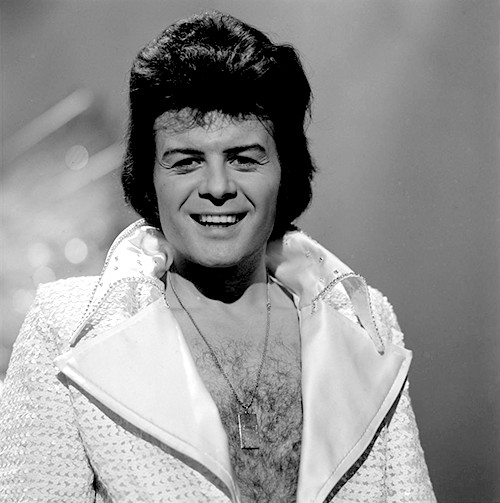
"Hello" features writing credits for Gary Glitter (pictured) and Mike Leander, due to the song's similarity to Glitter's track "Hello, Hello, I'm Back Again".

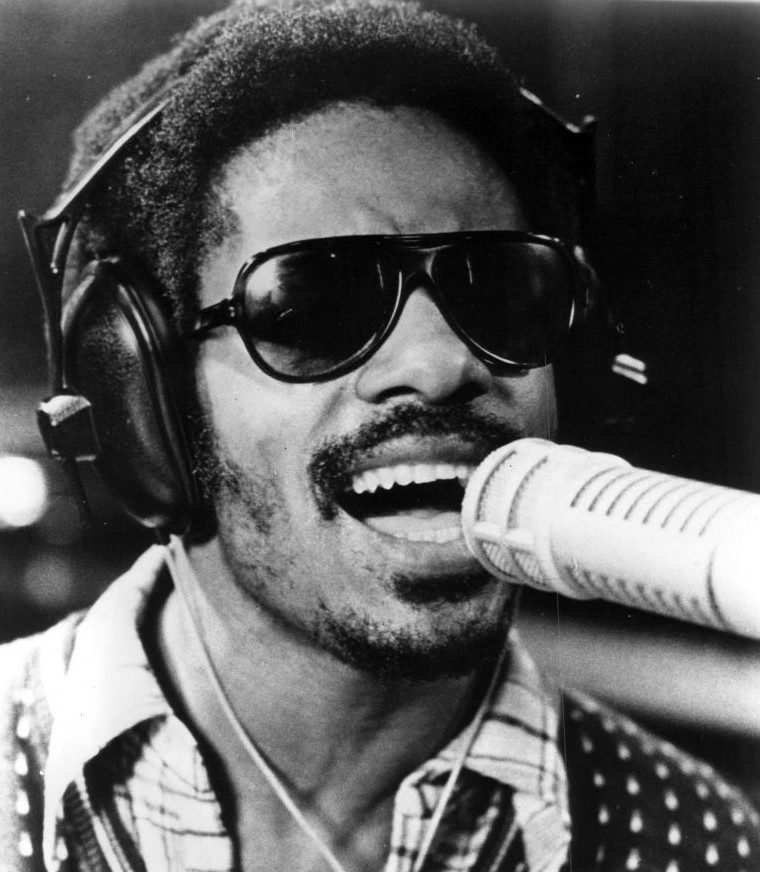
Stevie Wonder (pictured), Henry Cosby and Sylvia Moy are co-credited as writers on "Don't Look Back in Anger" B-side "Step Out", which bears a similarity to Wonder's single "Uptight (Everything's Alright)".

Key
Indicates song released as a single
Indicates song written solely by Noel Gallagher

List of songs recorded by Oasis, with writer(s), lead vocalist(s), original release and year
Title	Writer(s)	Lead vocalist(s)	Release	Year	Ref.
"Acquiesce"	Noel Gallagher	Liam Gallagher; Noel Gallagher	"Some Might Say"	1995	
"Ain't Got Nothin'"	Liam Gallagher	Liam Gallagher	Dig Out Your Soul	2008	
"Alive"	Noel Gallagher	Liam Gallagher	"Shakermaker"	1994	
"All Around the World"	Noel Gallagher	Liam Gallagher	Be Here Now	1997	
"All Around the World (Reprise)"	Noel Gallagher	none (instrumental)	Be Here Now	1997	
"Angel Child"	Noel Gallagher	Noel Gallagher	"D'You Know What I Mean?"	1997	
"(As Long as They've Got) Cigarettes in Hell"	Noel Gallagher	Noel Gallagher	"Go Let It Out"	2000	
"Bag It Up"	Noel Gallagher	Liam Gallagher	Dig Out Your Soul	2008	
"Be Here Now"	Noel Gallagher	Liam Gallagher	Be Here Now	1997	
"A Bell Will Ring"	Gem Archer	Liam Gallagher	Don't Believe the Truth	2005	
"Better Man"	Liam Gallagher	Liam Gallagher	Heathen Chemistry	2002	
"Bonehead's Bank Holiday"	Noel Gallagher	Noel Gallagher	(What's the Story) Morning Glory? (vinyl edition only)	1995	
"Born on a Different Cloud"	Liam Gallagher	Liam Gallagher; Noel Gallagher	Heathen Chemistry	2002	
"Boy with the Blues"	Liam Gallagher	Liam Gallagher	Dig Out Your Soul (box set bonus CD only)	2008	
"Bring It On Down"	Noel Gallagher	Liam Gallagher	Definitely Maybe	1994	
"The Cage" (hidden track)	Noel Gallagher	none (instrumental)	Heathen Chemistry	2002	
"Can Y'See It Now? (I Can See It Now!!)"	Noel Gallagher	Noel Gallagher	Don't Believe the Truth (Japanese edition only)	2005	
"Carry Us All"	Noel Gallagher	Noel Gallagher	"Sunday Morning Call"	2000	
"Cast No Shadow"	Noel Gallagher	Liam Gallagher	(What's the Story) Morning Glory?	1995	
"Champagne Supernova"	Noel Gallagher	Liam Gallagher	(What's the Story) Morning Glory?	1995	
"Cigarettes & Alcohol"	Noel Gallagher	Liam Gallagher	Definitely Maybe	1994	
"Cloudburst"	Noel Gallagher	Liam Gallagher	"Live Forever"	1994	
"Columbia"	Noel Gallagher	Liam Gallagher	Definitely Maybe	1994	
"Cum On Feel the Noize" (Slade cover)	Noddy Holder; Jim Lea	Liam Gallagher	"Don't Look Back in Anger"	1996	
"D'Yer Wanna Be a Spaceman?"	Noel Gallagher	Noel Gallagher	"Shakermaker"	1994	
"D'You Know What I Mean?"	Noel Gallagher	Liam Gallagher	Be Here Now	1997	
"Digsy's Dinner"	Noel Gallagher	Liam Gallagher	Definitely Maybe	1994	
"Don't Go Away"	Noel Gallagher	Liam Gallagher	Be Here Now	1997	
"Don't Look Back in Anger"	Noel Gallagher	Noel Gallagher	(What's the Story) Morning Glory?	1995	
"Don't Stop..."	Noel Gallagher	Noel Gallagher	"Don't Stop..."	2020	
"Eyeball Tickler"	Gem Archer	Liam Gallagher	"Lyla"	2005	
"Fade Away"	Noel Gallagher	Liam Gallagher	"Cigarettes & Alcohol"	1994	
"Fade In-Out"	Noel Gallagher	Liam Gallagher	Be Here Now	1997	
"Falling Down"	Noel Gallagher	Noel Gallagher	Dig Out Your Soul	2008	
"The Fame"	Noel Gallagher	Noel Gallagher	"All Around the World"	1998	
"Flashbax"	Noel Gallagher	Noel Gallagher	"All Around the World"	1998	
"Force of Nature"	Noel Gallagher	Noel Gallagher	Heathen Chemistry	2002	
"Fuckin' in the Bushes"	Noel Gallagher	Sampled verse and chorus	Standing on the Shoulder of Giants	2000	
"Full On"	Noel Gallagher	Noel Gallagher	"Sunday Morning Call"	2000	
"Gas Panic!"	Noel Gallagher	Liam Gallagher	Standing on the Shoulder of Giants	2000	
"(Get Off Your) High Horse Lady"	Noel Gallagher	Noel Gallagher	Dig Out Your Soul	2008	
"The Girl in the Dirty Shirt"	Noel Gallagher	Liam Gallagher	Be Here Now	1997	
"Go Let It Out"	Noel Gallagher	Liam Gallagher	Standing on the Shoulder of Giants	2000	
"Going Nowhere"	Noel Gallagher	Noel Gallagher	"Stand by Me"	1997	
"Guess God Thinks I'm Abel"	Liam Gallagher	Liam Gallagher	Don't Believe the Truth	2005	
"Half the World Away"	Noel Gallagher	Noel Gallagher	"Whatever"	1994	
"Headshrinker"	Noel Gallagher	Liam Gallagher	"Some Might Say"	1995	
"Hello"	Noel Gallagher; Gary Glitter; Mike Leander	Liam Gallagher	(What's the Story) Morning Glory?	1995	
"Helter Skelter" (The Beatles cover)	John Lennon; Paul McCartney	Noel Gallagher	"Who Feels Love?"	2000	
"Heroes" (David Bowie cover)	David Bowie; Brian Eno	Noel Gallagher	"D'You Know What I Mean?"	1997	
"Hey Now!"	Noel Gallagher	Liam Gallagher	(What's the Story) Morning Glory?	1995	
"Hey Hey, My My" (Neil Young cover)	Neil Young	Noel Gallagher	Familiar To Millions	2000	
"The Hindu Times"	Noel Gallagher	Liam Gallagher	Heathen Chemistry	2002	
"Hung in a Bad Place"	Gem Archer	Liam Gallagher	Heathen Chemistry	2002	
"I am the Walrus" (The Beatles cover)	John Lennon; Paul McCartney	Liam Gallagher	Cigarettes & Alcohol	1994	
"I Believe in All"	Liam Gallagher	Liam Gallagher	Dig Out Your Soul (Japanese edition only)	2008	
"I Can See a Liar"	Noel Gallagher	Liam Gallagher	Standing on the Shoulder of Giants	2000	
"(I Got) The Fever"	Noel Gallagher	Liam Gallagher	"Stand by Me"	1997	
"I Hope, I Think, I Know"	Noel Gallagher	Liam Gallagher	Be Here Now	1997	
"I'm Outta Time"	Liam Gallagher	Liam Gallagher	Dig Out Your Soul	2008	
"Idler's Dream"	Noel Gallagher	Noel Gallagher	"The Hindu Times"	2002	
"If We Shadows"	Noel Gallagher	Noel Gallagher	Be Here Now (reissue)	2016	
"The Importance of Being Idle"	Noel Gallagher	Noel Gallagher	Don't Believe the Truth	2005	
"It's Better People"	Noel Gallagher	Noel Gallagher	"Roll with It"	1995	
"It's Gettin' Better (Man!!)"	Noel Gallagher	Liam Gallagher	Be Here Now	1997	
"(It's Good) To Be Free"	Noel Gallagher	Liam Gallagher	"Whatever"	1994	
"Just Getting Older"	Noel Gallagher	Noel Gallagher	"The Hindu Times"	2002	
"Keep the Dream Alive"	Andy Bell	Liam Gallagher	Don't Believe the Truth	2005	
"Let There Be Love"	Noel Gallagher	Liam Gallagher; Noel Gallagher	Don't Believe the Truth	2005	
"Let's All Make Believe"	Noel Gallagher	Liam Gallagher	"Go Let It Out"	2000	
"Listen Up"	Noel Gallagher	Liam Gallagher	"Cigarettes & Alcohol"	1994	
"Little by Little" (Double A side with She Is Love)	Noel Gallagher	Noel Gallagher	Heathen Chemistry	2002	
"Little James"	Liam Gallagher	Liam Gallagher	Standing on the Shoulder of Giants	2000	
"Live Forever"	Noel Gallagher	Liam Gallagher	Definitely Maybe	1994	
"Lord Don't Slow Me Down"	Noel Gallagher	Noel Gallagher	"Lord Don't Slow Me Down"	2007	
"Love Like a Bomb"	Liam Gallagher; Gem Archer	Liam Gallagher	Don't Believe the Truth	2005	
"Lyla"	Noel Gallagher	Liam Gallagher	Don't Believe the Truth	2005	
"Magic Pie"	Noel Gallagher	Noel Gallagher	Be Here Now	1997	
"Married with Children"	Noel Gallagher	Liam Gallagher	Definitely Maybe	1994	
"The Masterplan"	Noel Gallagher	Noel Gallagher	"Wonderwall"	1995	
"The Meaning of Soul"	Liam Gallagher	Liam Gallagher	Don't Believe the Truth	2005	
"Merry Xmas Everybody" (Slade cover)	Noddy Holder; Jim Lea	Noel Gallagher	NME Presents: 1 Love	2002	
"Morning Glory"	Noel Gallagher	Liam Gallagher	(What's the Story) Morning Glory?	1995	
"Mucky Fingers"	Noel Gallagher	Noel Gallagher	Don't Believe the Truth	2005	
"My Big Mouth"	Noel Gallagher	Liam Gallagher	Be Here Now	1997	
"My Generation" (The Who cover)	Pete Townshend	Liam Gallagher; Noel Gallagher	"Little by Little/She Is Love"	2002	
"My Sister Lover"	Noel Gallagher	Liam Gallagher	"Stand by Me"	1997	
"The Nature of Reality"	Andy Bell	Liam Gallagher	Dig Out Your Soul	2008	
"One Way Road"	Noel Gallagher	Noel Gallagher	"Who Feels Love?"	2000	
"Part of the Queue"	Noel Gallagher	Noel Gallagher	Don't Believe the Truth	2005	
"Pass Me Down the Wine"	Liam Gallagher	Liam Gallagher	"The Importance of Being Idle"	2005	
"(Probably) All in the Mind"	Noel Gallagher	Liam Gallagher	Heathen Chemistry	2002	
"Put Yer Money Where Yer Mouth Is"	Noel Gallagher	Liam Gallagher; Noel Gallagher	Standing on the Shoulder of Giants	2000	
"A Quick Peep"	Andy Bell	none (instrumental)	Heathen Chemistry	2002	
"The Quiet Ones"	Gem Archer	Liam Gallagher	"The Importance of Being Idle"	2005	
"Rock 'n' Roll Star"	Noel Gallagher	Liam Gallagher	Definitely Maybe	1994	
"Rockin' Chair"	Noel Gallagher	Liam Gallagher	"Roll with It"	1995	
"Roll It Over"	Noel Gallagher	Liam Gallagher	Standing on the Shoulder of Giants	2000	
"Roll with It"	Noel Gallagher	Liam Gallagher	(What's the Story) Morning Glory?	1995	
"Round Are Way"	Noel Gallagher	Liam Gallagher	"Wonderwall"	1995	
"Sad Song"	Noel Gallagher	Noel Gallagher	Definitely Maybe (vinyl and Japanese editions only)	1994	
"Setting Sun"	Noel Gallagher; Tom Rowlands; Ed Simons	Noel Gallagher	Be Here Now (reissue)	2016	
"Shakermaker"	Noel Gallagher	Liam Gallagher	Definitely Maybe	1994	
"She Is Love" (Double A side with Little by Little)	Noel Gallagher	Noel Gallagher	Heathen Chemistry	2002	
"She's Electric"	Noel Gallagher	Liam Gallagher	(What's the Story) Morning Glory?	1995	
"The Shock of the Lightning"	Noel Gallagher	Liam Gallagher	Dig Out Your Soul	2008	
"Shout It Out Loud"	Noel Gallagher	Noel Gallagher	"Stop Crying Your Heart Out"	2002	
"Sittin' Here in Silence (On My Own)"	Noel Gallagher	Noel Gallagher	"Let There Be Love"	2005	
"Slide Away"	Noel Gallagher	Liam Gallagher	Definitely Maybe	1994	
"Soldier On"	Liam Gallagher	Liam Gallagher	Dig Out Your Soul	2008	
"Some Might Say"	Noel Gallagher	Liam Gallagher	(What's the Story) Morning Glory?	1995	
"Songbird"	Liam Gallagher	Liam Gallagher	Heathen Chemistry	2002	
"Stand by Me"	Noel Gallagher	Liam Gallagher	Be Here Now	1997	
"Stay Young"	Noel Gallagher	Liam Gallagher	"D'You Know What I Mean?"	1997	
"Step Out"	Noel Gallagher; Stevie Wonder; Henry Cosby; Sylvia Moy	Noel Gallagher	"Don't Look Back in Anger"	1996	
"Stop Crying Your Heart Out"	Noel Gallagher	Liam Gallagher	Heathen Chemistry	2002	
"Strange Thing"	Noel Gallagher	Liam Gallagher	Definitely Maybe (reissue)	2014	
"Street Fighting Man" (The Rolling Stones cover)	Mick Jagger; Keith Richards	Liam Gallagher	"All Around the World"	1998	
"Sunday Morning Call"	Noel Gallagher	Noel Gallagher	Standing on the Shoulder of Giants	2000	
"Supersonic"	Noel Gallagher	Liam Gallagher	Definitely Maybe	1994	
"The Swamp Song"	Noel Gallagher	none (instrumental)	"Wonderwall"	1995	
"Take Me Away"	Noel Gallagher	Noel Gallagher	"Supersonic"	1994	
"Talk Tonight"	Noel Gallagher	Noel Gallagher	"Some Might Say"	1995	
"Thank You for the Good Times"	Andy Bell	Liam Gallagher	"Stop Crying Your Heart Out"	2002	
"Those Swollen Hand Blues"	Noel Gallagher	Noel Gallagher	"Falling Down"	2009	
"To Be Where There's Life"	Gem Archer	Liam Gallagher	Dig Out Your Soul	2008	
"Trip Inside"	Noel Gallagher	none (instrumental)	Be Here Now (Reissue)	2016	
"Turn Up the Sun"	Andy Bell	Liam Gallagher	Don't Believe the Truth	2005	
"The Turning"	Noel Gallagher	Liam Gallagher	Dig Out Your Soul	2008	
"Underneath the Sky"	Noel Gallagher	Liam Gallagher	"Don't Look Back in Anger"	1996	
"Up in the Sky"	Noel Gallagher	Liam Gallagher	Definitely Maybe	1994	
"Untitled (Demo)"	Noel Gallagher	Noel Gallagher	Be Here Now (Reissue)	2016	
"Waiting for the Rapture"	Noel Gallagher	Noel Gallagher	Dig Out Your Soul	2008	
"Whatever"	Noel Gallagher; Neil Innes	Liam Gallagher	"Whatever"	1994	
"Where Did It All Go Wrong?"	Noel Gallagher	Noel Gallagher	Standing on the Shoulder of Giants	2000	
"Who Feels Love?"	Noel Gallagher	Liam Gallagher	Standing on the Shoulder of Giants	2000	
"Who Put the Weight of the World on My Shoulders?"	Noel Gallagher	Noel Gallagher	Goal!	2005	
"Within You Without You" (The Beatles cover)	George Harrison	Liam Gallagher	No Release – 40th anniversary special on BBC Radio 2 for Sgt. Pepper's Lonely Hearts Club Band	2007	
"Won't Let You Down"	Liam Gallagher	Liam Gallagher	"Lyla"	2005	
"Wonderwall"	Noel Gallagher	Liam Gallagher	(What's the Story) Morning Glory?	1995	
"(You've Got) the Heart of a Star"	Noel Gallagher	Noel Gallagher	"Songbird"	2003	
"You've Got to Hide Your Love Away" (The Beatles cover)	John Lennon; Paul McCartney	Noel Gallagher	"Some Might Say"	1995	

== See also ==
- Oasis discography
