= Lord Don't Slow Me Down =

2007 film by Baillie Walsh

- Directed by: Baillie Walsh
- Produced by: Josh Barwick
- Starring: Oasis
- Cinematography: Baillie Walsh
- Edited by: Struan Clay
- Music by: Oasis
- Distributed by: Black Dog Films
- Release date: 19 November 2006 (Channel 4)
- Running time: 94 minutes 56 minutes (TV)
- Language: English

Lord Don't Slow Me Down is a 2006 rockumentary film looking back on English rock band Oasis' Don't Believe the Truth world tour which took place from May 2005 to March 2006. The film was directed by Baillie Walsh and premiered at the CMJ Film Festival on 4 November 2006, before it was released on DVD in October 2007. It went platinum in the UK.

== Pre-release ==
A handful of fans-only private screenings took place around the world with the world premiere of the film at the Directors Guild Theater in New York City on 4 November 2006 as part of the CMJ Film Festival. The UK television premiere was on Channel 4 on 19 November, at 11:50pm, although it was a heavily edited version with approximately 40 minutes cut from the original 95 minute version. The film was unveiled to coincide with Oasis' compilation album Stop the Clocks, released on 20 November 2006. A preview of the film was included on the Let There Be Love DVD single, released in November 2005.

The film featured the Oasis song also called "Lord Don't Slow Me Down", written by Noel Gallagher and recorded during the Don't Believe the Truth sessions, Gallagher described it as being "one of the best things, like The Who, The Yardbirds and the Jeff Beck Group combined, and it's got two drum solos on it!". He has also said that his girlfriend thought it was the only Oasis song you could dance to. The song was left off Don't Believe the Truth because Gallagher felt that including it would have meant he'd have been singing too many songs on the record. Italian footballer Alessandro Del Piero also appears in the video signing a shirt for Noel.

== DVD release ==
Lord Don't Slow Me Down was released on DVD on 29 October 2007. The DVD set contents:

Disc One:

- Documentary tour film Lord Don’t Slow Me Down in stereo and surround sound.
- Bonus audio commentary featuring the members of the band
- A Noel Gallagher Q&A session with the fans filmed in New York City in 2006

Disc Two: Oasis live at City of Manchester Stadium on 2 July 2005 in HD with stereo and surround sound. This concert has also been shown regularly on the HD music television channel, "Rave".

1. "Fuckin' in the Bushes"
2. "Turn Up the Sun"
3. "Lyla"
4. "Cigarettes & Alcohol"
5. "The Importance of Being Idle"
6. "Little by Little"
7. "A Bell Will Ring"
8. "Acquiesce"
9. "Songbird"
10. "Live Forever"
11. "Mucky Fingers"
12. "Wonderwall"
13. "Rock 'n' Roll Star"
14. "The Meaning of Soul"
15. "Don't Look Back in Anger"
16. "My Generation"
17. Unique footage and pictures sent in by fans who attended the concert

== Certifications ==
Region	Certification	Certified units/sales
Brazil (Pro-Música Brasil)	Gold	15,000^{*}
United Kingdom (BPI)	Platinum	50,000^{^}
^{*} Sales figures based on certification alone.^{^} Shipments figures based on certification alone.
