= The Importance of Being Idle =

The Importance of Being Idle may refer to:

- The Importance of Being Idle (book), a book by Stephen Robins
- "The Importance of Being Idle" (song), a song by the band Oasis
