= I'll Show You =

I'll Show You or I Will Show You may refer to:

- "I'll Show You" (Justin Bieber song), 2015
- "I'll Show You" (Alexander Rybak and Paula Seling song), 2012
- "I'll Show You", 1963 single by William Bell
- "I'll Show You", song on Dexys Midnight Runners album Too-Rye-Ay
- "I'll Show You", song on Boyz II Men album Full Circle written by James Moss
- "I Will Show You", song by Oasis from album The Early Years
- "Boyeojulge" (보여줄게 I Will Show You), a 2012 song by Ailee from album Invitation
- "I'll Show You", 2020 song on K/DA's All Out (EP)
