= DBTT =

DBTT can stand for:

- Ductile-Brittle Transition Temperature, a concept in Materials Science
- Don't Believe the Truth, the sixth album by British rock band Oasis
