= Let There Be Love (Oasis song) =

2005 single by Oasis

Single by Oasis

from the album Don't Believe the Truth
- B-side: "Sittin' Here in Silence (On My Own)"; "Rock 'n' Roll Star" (live)
- Released: 28 November 2005
- Studio: Strangeways, Metropolis, Wheeler End (England); Capitol (Los Angeles)
- Genre: Rock
- Length: 5:31 (album version); 3:53 (single and radio edit)
- Label: Big Brother
- Songwriter: Noel Gallagher
- Producers: Dave Sardy, Noel Gallagher

Oasis singles chronology
| "The Importance of Being Idle" (2005) | "Let There Be Love" (2005) | "Lord Don't Slow Me Down" (2007) |

Music video
- "Oasis - Let There Be Love (Official Video)" on YouTube

"Let There Be Love" is a song by English rock band Oasis from their sixth studio album, Don't Believe the Truth (2005). Written by Noel Gallagher, it is the fifth and the last Oasis song to feature Liam and Noel sharing lead vocals, the other songs being "Acquiesce", "Put Yer Money Where Yer Mouth Is", "Born on a Different Cloud" and the band's cover of the Who's "My Generation". It was released on 28 November 2005 as the third and final single from the album in the United Kingdom and as the second single in the United States.

"Let There Be Love" reached number two on the UK Singles Chart and peaked atop the Scottish Singles Chart. In Ireland, the song reached number 14, becoming the band's 21st top-20 single there. In continental Europe, the song reached number two in Italy but was a minor hit elsewhere, charting only in Germany and the Netherlands.

== Background and recording ==
A Noel-sung demo for the track was recorded in 1999 during sessions for Standing on the Shoulder of Giants. A bootleg of these demo sessions was leaked onto the Internet in early 2000. This track was given the unofficial title "It's a Crime" on many bootlegs as the track was unknown and unreferenced anywhere before then. The album version of the song is structurally almost exactly the same as the demo with a slight change in melody in the part that Noel sings. The lyrics to the chorus remains intact, but the verses and bridge have totally rewritten lyrics. The single version of the song omits the second verse and chorus.

A second Noel-sung demo was released on the "Let There Be Love" DVD single. It has the same lyrics as the album version, and the album version takes some elements from the demo such as the piano. It was probably recorded sometime in 2003 or 2004, prior to the main recording sessions for Don't Believe the Truth.

== Music video ==
The video, directed by Baillie Walsh, is a montage of some of Oasis' live shows during the summer of 2005, including clips of the concerts at Hampden Park and the City of Manchester Stadium. The clips do not actually show the band playing "Let There Be Love", as the band didn't play the song at either of these shows. Later, the video clip appeared on their Don't Believe the Truth Tour rockumentary, Lord Don't Slow Me Down.

== Live performances ==
The song has only been played live five times, the first three in London, and the last two on Italian and Dutch radio shows in late 2005. However, both were acoustic performances featuring only Noel Gallagher. Oasis also performed the song on several television shows, such as BBC's Top of the Pops, but these performances used a pre-recorded track, so the song has never actually been performed live by the entire band.

== Track listings ==
UK CD single

1. "Let There Be Love"
2. "Sittin' Here in Silence (On My Own)"
3. "Rock 'n' Roll Star" (live at City of Manchester Stadium, 2 July 2005)

UK DVD single

1. "Let There Be Love"
2. "Let There Be Love" (demo)
3. Excerpts from the forthcoming film Lord Don't Slow Me Down and the "Let There Be Love" video

UK 10-inch single and European CD single

1. "Let There Be Love"
2. "Sittin' Here in Silence (On My Own)"

Japanese CD single

1. "Let There Be Love"
2. "Rock 'n' Roll Star" (live at City of Manchester Stadium, 2 July 2005)
3. "Don't Look Back in Anger" (live at City of Manchester Stadium, 2 July 2005)

== Personnel ==
Oasis

- Liam Gallagher – lead vocals and tambourine
- Noel Gallagher – lead vocals, lead and acoustic guitars
- Gem Archer – rhythm guitar
- Andy Bell – bass

Additional musicians

- Zak Starkey – drums
- Paul Stacey – piano and Mellotron

== Charts ==
=== Weekly charts ===
| Chart (2005) | Peak position |
|---|---|
| Europe (Eurochart Hot 100) | 5 |
| Germany (GfK) | 88 |
| Ireland (IRMA) | 14 |
| Italy (FIMI) | 2 |
| Netherlands (Single Top 100) | 85 |
| Scottish Singles Sales (Official Charts) | 1 |
| UK Singles (Official Charts) | 2 |

=== Year-end charts ===
| Chart (2005) | Position |
|---|---|
| UK Singles (OCC) | 89 |

== Certifications ==
| Region | Certification | Certified units/sales |
|---|---|---|
| United Kingdom (BPI) | Silver | 200,000^{‡} |
^{‡} Sales+streaming figures based on certification alone.

== Release history ==
| Region | Date | Format(s) | Label(s) | Ref. |
|---|---|---|---|---|
| United Kingdom | 28 November 2005 | CD | Big Brother | |
| Japan | 21 December 2005 | CD | Epic | |
