= Lyla (song) =

2005 single by Oasis

Single by Oasis

from the album Don't Believe the Truth
- B-side: "Eyeball Tickler"; "Won't Let You Down"
- Released: 11 May 2005
- Studio: Wheeler End (England)
- Genre: Rock
- Length: 5:12
- Label: Big Brother
- Songwriter: Noel Gallagher
- Producers: Noel Gallagher; Dave Sardy

Oasis singles chronology
| "Songbird" (2003) | "Lyla" (2005) | "The Importance of Being Idle" (2005) |

Music video
- "Oasis - Lyla (Official Video)" on YouTube

"Lyla" is a song by the English rock band Oasis. It was released in May 2005 as the first single from their sixth studio album, Don't Believe the Truth (2005). "Lyla" was the band's first single following the departure of their long-time drummer Alan White, and replaced by Ringo Starr's son and the Who drummer Zak Starkey as an additional drummer of the band.

The song was written by Oasis guitarist Noel Gallagher, who has varyingly described the track as "specifically designed for pogoing", "annoyingly catchy", and the "poppiest thing since "Roll with It". Noting the varied influences of the song, Gallagher says that it's "a bit like... The Soundtrack of Our Lives doing the Who on Skol in a psychedelic city in the sky, or something".

== Composition ==
Noel Gallagher says that the song existed in an early form as a song called "Sing" and dated from the Heathen Chemistry-era. He also says that the title for the final song should have been "Smiler", but was changed seeing as guitarist Gem Archer's previous band, Heavy Stereo, also had a song called "Smiler". Noel has also joked with the fact that the Lyla in the song is actually the sister of the Sally mentioned in the Oasis single "Don't Look Back in Anger". Also, he had said that the song is a "love song", being about Sally's sister.

Originally claiming that he was not very fond of the song, Noel has said that "Lyla" "isn't even the fifth best track on the album". The song had existed as a demo since the early recording sessions for the album but was all but forgotten until practically the last minute. However, on the Lock the Box feature on the compilation album Stop the Clocks (2006), Noel admitted that he "didn't realise how good it was until [we] played it live", while Liam Gallagher stated that he loved the "guitars, the drums, and the vocals" of the song.

== Release ==
"Lyla" was released in Japan on 11 May 2005 and in the United Kingdom and Australia five days later, on 16 May. It became the band's seventh UK number one when it reached top spot on the UK Singles Chart during its first week of release. The song also debuted at number 31 on the US Modern Rock Tracks chart, peaking at number 19. It also appeared on the US Bubbling Under Hot 100 chart at number eight. It was the first Oasis song to appear on any US singles chart since 2000, when "Go Let It Out" reached number 14 on the Modern Rock Tracks chart. Sony's insistence that "Lyla" be released as the first single from the album helped to fuel the tension between the band and their record label, which led to Oasis not renewing their contract with the record label following the release of Don't Believe the Truth.

== Live performances ==
When performing on the UK music chart show Top of the Pops, Liam, who was forced to mime to the music, made no secret of the fact, walking away from the microphone with his mouth closed mid-way through lines that he was supposedly 'singing'. It would be Liam's last performance on the programme before its demise in late 2006. However, Noel and the rest of the band would return in August 2005 to perform "The Importance of Being Idle" and later in 2009 to perform their last ever released single "Falling Down". Liam performed the song for the first time as a solo artist at Hackney Round Chapel (where the music video to "Lyla" was filmed) on 5 June 2019.

== Track listing ==
- Digital download and CD single
1. "Lyla" (Noel Gallagher) – 5:12
2. "Eyeball Tickler" (Gem Archer) – 2:47
3. "Won't Let You Down" (Liam Gallagher) – 2:48
- UK 7-inch single
1. "Lyla" (Noel Gallagher)
2. "Eyeball Tickler" (Archer)
- UK DVD single
1. "Lyla"
2. "Lyla" (demo)
3. "Can You See It Now?" (documentary)

== Personnel ==
- Liam Gallagher – lead vocals and backing vocals, tambourine
- Noel Gallagher – lead guitar, acoustic guitar and backing vocals
- Gem Archer – rhythm guitar and piano
- Andy Bell – bass
- Zak Starkey – drums

== Charts ==
=== Weekly charts ===
| Chart (2005) | Peak position |
|---|---|
| Australia (ARIA) | 23 |
| Austria (Ö3 Austria Top 40) | 38 |
| Belgium (Ultratip Bubbling Under Flanders) | 13 |
| Belgium (Ultratip Bubbling Under Wallonia) | 10 |
| Canada (Nielsen SoundScan) | 4 |
| Canada Rock Top 30 (Radio & Records) | 3 |
| Denmark (Tracklisten) | 5 |
| Europe (Eurochart Hot 100) | 3 |
| Finland (Suomen virallinen lista) | 3 |
| France (SNEP) | 81 |
| Germany (GfK) | 33 |
| Greece (IFPI) | 9 |
| Hungary (Single Top 40) | 6 |
| Ireland (IRMA) | 5 |
| Italy (FIMI) | 2 |
| Netherlands (Dutch Top 40 Tipparade) | 3 |
| Netherlands (Single Top 100) | 52 |
| Norway (VG-lista) | 10 |
| Scottish Singles Sales (Official Charts) | 1 |
| Spain (Promusicae) | 3 |
| Sweden (Sverigetopplistan) | 18 |
| Switzerland (Schweizer Hitparade) | 26 |
| UK Singles (Official Charts) | 1 |
| US Bubbling Under Hot 100 (Billboard) | 8 |
| US Alternative Airplay (Billboard) | 19 |
| US Digital Song Sales (Billboard) | 74 |

=== Year-end charts ===
| Chart (2005) | Position |
|---|---|
| Italy (FIMI) | 36 |
| UK Singles (OCC) | 31 |
| US Modern Rock Tracks (Billboard) | 86 |

== Certifications ==
| Region | Certification | Certified units/sales |
|---|---|---|
| United Kingdom (BPI) | Gold | 400,000^{‡} |
^{‡} Sales+streaming figures based on certification alone.

== Release history ==
| Region | Date | Format(s) | Label(s) | Ref. |
|---|---|---|---|---|
| United States | 11 April 2005 | Triple A; alternative radio | Epic | |
| Japan | 11 May 2005 | CD | Epic | |
| Australia | 16 May 2005 | CD | Helter Skelter | |
| United Kingdom | 16 May 2005 | 7-inch vinyl; CD; DVD | Big Brother | |

== In popular culture ==
The song was included on the soundtrack of the football video game FIFA 06.
