= The Hindu Times =

2002 single by Oasis

Single by Oasis

from the album Heathen Chemistry
- B-side: "Just Getting Older"; "Idler's Dream"
- Released: 15 April 2002
- Genre: Alternative rock; psychedelic rock; neo-psychedelia
- Length: 3:53
- Label: Big Brother
- Songwriter: Noel Gallagher
- Producer: Oasis

Oasis singles chronology
"Sunday Morning Call" (2000)	"The Hindu Times" (2002)	"Stop Crying Your Heart Out" (2002)

Music video
- "Oasis - The Hindu Times (Official Video)" on YouTube

"The Hindu Times" is a song by English rock band Oasis. It was written by the band's lead guitarist Noel Gallagher, and was released as the lead single from their fifth studio album, Heathen Chemistry, on 15 April 2002. On the album, it segues directly into the next track, "Force of Nature", which also segues into "Hung In a Bad Place".

The song peaked at number one on the UK Singles Chart, becoming the band's sixth number-one single in their native country, remaining on top for one week before being dislodged by the Sugababes' "Freak Like Me". The song also topped the charts in Canada, Italy and Scotland, and reached the top 10 in Denmark, Finland, Ireland, Norway, and Spain. This is their first single to feature former Heavy Stereo frontman Gem Archer (rhythm guitarist) and then-former Ride frontman Andy Bell (bassist).

== Background and composition ==
The song, which combines powerful rock with a psychedelic feel, was unveiled during Oasis's Autumn 2001 Noise and Confusion Tour. The song was due to be released commercially at the same time, but Noel decided the track needed more work done on it to be suitable for release. Many have commented on the main guitar riff being lifted from the Stereophonics song "Same Size Feet", which uses exactly the same, or at least very similar, guitar riff. The B-side, "Just Getting Older", was written at the time of the release of Standing on the Shoulder of Giants (2000). The second B-side, "Idler's Dream", is the only Oasis song to not feature any guitars and is one of the four, the others being "Take Me Away", "Married with Children" and "Sad Song", to not feature drums; the song consists simply of Noel Gallagher's vocals and a piano/organ accompaniment. The song was written back in January 1999 while Noel Gallagher was in Thailand.

The title has little to do with the lyrics of the song, which are more in the vein of Definitely Maybe's "Rock 'n' Roll Star". Noel got the name "The Hindu Times" from a T-shirt he saw in a charity shop. It has been speculated that the title refers to the main riff's similarity to Indian music in sound, sounding as if it were played on a sitar. Gallagher himself says that it is because he had already named the song before any lyrics were written for it.

== Critical reception ==
"The Hindu Times" was one of the first Oasis singles since the singles from (What's the Story) Morning Glory? (1995) to receive almost unanimously positive reviews from critics. In 2008 NME listed the song as one of the greatest indie anthems of the 2000s. In October 2011, NME placed it at number 143 on its list "150 Best Tracks of the Past 15 Years". In 2010, XFM listed it in their "1000 greatest songs of all time" list.

"The Hindu Times" was scheduled to be played during the Parade of Nations at the 2012 Summer Olympics opening ceremony as an example of British music, but the Parade took much less time than expected, so the song was not used.

== Music video ==
The original video was set to be filmed in New Delhi, but this did not work out. The music video was finally filmed at Abbey Road Studios, where the song was recorded.

== Track listings ==
- UK CD single (RKIDSCD 23)
1. "The Hindu Times"
2. "Just Getting Older"
3. "Idler's Dream"
- UK 7-inch single (RKID 23)
1. "The Hindu Times"
2. "Just Getting Older"
- UK 12-inch single (RKID 23T)
1. "The Hindu Times"
2. "Just Getting Older"
3. "Idler's Dream"
- UK DVD single (RKIDSDVD 23)
1. "The Hindu Times"
2. "The Hindu Times" (demo)
3. "10 Minutes of Noise and Confusion Pt One" (North America, June 2001)
- The demo version of "The Hindu Times" is radically different from the finished album version. Most of the lyrics (sung by Noel) are different, and the slower sound of the song is much more "grungy", with a heavy drum loop running throughout the song. It is also a semitone higher in the demo.
- The "10 Minutes..." documentary is the first part of a unique feature covering 48 hours on the road with Oasis during the Tour of Brotherly Love which took place in the US with the Black Crowes during May and June 2001.

== Personnel ==
- Liam Gallagher – lead vocals, tambourine
- Noel Gallagher – lead guitars, acoustic guitar, backing vocals
- Gem Archer – rhythm guitar
- Andy Bell – bass
- Alan White – drums
- Paul Stacey – Mellotron

== Charts ==
=== Weekly charts ===
Weekly chart performance for "The Hindu Times"
Chart (2002)	Peak position
Australia (ARIA)	22
Austria (Ö3 Austria Top 40)	29
Belgium (Ultratip Bubbling Under Flanders)	15
Belgium (Ultratip Bubbling Under Wallonia)	11
Canada (Nielsen SoundScan)	1
Denmark (Tracklisten)	7
Europe (Eurochart Hot 100)	3
Finland (Suomen virallinen lista)	5
France (SNEP)	84
Germany (GfK)	30
Greece (IFPI)	31
Hungary (Single Top 40)	20
Ireland (IRMA)	2
Italy (FIMI)	1
Netherlands (Dutch Top 40 Tipparade)	16
Netherlands (Single Top 100)	47
New Zealand (Recorded Music NZ)	47
Norway (VG-lista)	3
Scotland Singles (OCC)	1
Spain (Promusicae)	2
Sweden (Sverigetopplistan)	13
Switzerland (Schweizer Hitparade)	15
UK Singles (OCC)	1

=== Year-end charts ===
Year-end chart performance for "The Hindu Times"
Chart (2002)	Position
Canada (Nielsen SoundScan)	16
Ireland (IRMA)	72
Italy (FIMI)	40
UK Singles (OCC)	43

== Certifications ==
Certifications and sales for "The Hindu Times"
Region	Certification	Certified units/sales
United Kingdom (BPI)	Gold	400,000^{‡}
^{‡} Sales+streaming figures based on certification alone.

== Release history ==
Release dates and formats for "The Hindu Times"
Region	Date	Format(s)	Label(s)	Ref.
United Kingdom	15 April 2002	7-inch vinyl; CD	Big Brother	
United Kingdom	22 April 2002	12-inch vinyl	Big Brother	
Australia	22 April 2002	CD	Helter Skelter	
Japan	24 April 2002	CD	Epic	
United States	7 May 2002	Alternative radio	Epic	
