= Stop Crying Your Heart Out =

2002 single by Oasis

Single by Oasis

from the album Heathen Chemistry
- B-side: "Thank You for the Good Times"; "Shout It Out Loud"
- Released: 28 May 2002
- Studio: Wheeler End, Olympic (London)
- Genre: Rock; Britpop
- Length: 5:02
- Label: Big Brother
- Songwriter: Noel Gallagher
- Producer: Oasis

Oasis singles chronology
"The Hindu Times" (2002)	"Stop Crying Your Heart Out" (2002)	"Little by Little" / "She Is Love" (2002)

Music video
- "Stop Crying Your Heart Out" on YouTube

"Stop Crying Your Heart Out" is a song by the English rock band Oasis. The song was written by Noel Gallagher and produced by Oasis. It was released in the United States on 28 May 2002 and in the United Kingdom on 17 June as the second single from the band's fifth studio album, Heathen Chemistry (2002).

"Stop Crying Your Heart Out" debuted and peaked at number two on the UK Singles Chart and reached a peak of number six on the UK Indie Chart. It peaked at number one in Italy and reached the top 10 in Canada, Spain, and Hungary. It also reached the top 20 in Belgium, Denmark, Finland, and Norway. The song was certified silver by the British Phonographic Industry (BPI) on 12 July 2002, It has since been certified double platinum selling over 1,200,000 copies.

British singer-songwriter Leona Lewis recorded a cover version for her second studio album, Echo (2009). She performed her version on the sixth series finale of The X Factor, and it peaked at number 29 on the UK Singles Chart and number 11 on the UK R&B Chart.

== Composition and lyrics ==
"Stop Crying Your Heart Out" was written solely by Noel Gallagher, and was produced by Oasis. The song was recorded at Wheeler End Studios and Olympic Studios in England, and was mixed by Mark Stent. It was engineered by David Treahearn, Jan "Stan" Kybert and Paul "P-Dub" Walton. "Stop Crying Your Heart Out" is a motivational ballad which lasts for a duration of five minutes and five seconds. Its melodic structure bears strong resemblances to "Slide Away", one of their songs from their debut studio album, Definitely Maybe (1994), while its hook is reminiscent of the chorus of their 1996 song "Don't Look Back in Anger". Liam Gallagher "croons" the lines "All of us stars/ We're fading away/ Just try not to worry/ You'll see them some day" (Note: According to Oasis's official website, the lyrics are "'Cause all of the stars/ Are fading away/ Just try not to worry/ You'll see them some day") as an orchestra plays in the background. "Stop Crying Your Heart Out" was composed in the key of B minor using common time at 76 beats per minute.

== Critical reception ==
Jason Fox for NME felt that "Stop Crying Your Heart Out" was Oasis's return to the "long lost humanism" of their 1996 single "Don't Look Back in Anger", because of Noel Gallagher's ability to lighten the mood of his audience when they are in need. He further wrote that the listener is transported back to when "Don't Look Back in Anger" was released. Simon Evans for musicOMH also compared the song to "Don't Look Back in Anger", writing that they have the same "defiance". Stephen Thomas Erlewine for AllMusic was brief in his review of the song, simply writing that it is a "pretty good power ballad". Evan Chakroff for Stylus Magazine wrote that the song was forgettable, adding that while writing his review of the album, he could not remember the melody of "Stop Crying Your Heart Out". Victoria Segal for NME wrote a single review when it was released, and believed that it was difficult to take the song seriously. Segal wrote that it is a "disappointing" song that when "looked at in the sober light of day, it's nothing but a lachrymose slur through the Big Noel Book Of Emotional Cliches and some truly shameless piano, but you just know that come closing time, it could make a breeze block cry. And there lies Oasis‘ eternal magic, damn them." BBC reviewer Chris Long stated he preferred previous single "The Hindu Times" but "Stop Crying Your Heart Out" delivered on the "simple tunes, good strong riffs and textbook lyrics" in which Gallagher specialised.

== Chart performance ==
"Stop Crying Your Heart Out" debuted and peaked at number two on the UK Singles Chart on 29 June 2002. The following week on 6 July, it fell two positions to number four, and again down to number 13 in its third week. It charted at number 23 and 28 in its fourth and fifth weeks, respectively. In 2009, the song re-entered the UK Singles Chart at number 71 on 14 November. It remained on the chart for a further week. In 2010, it re-entered the chart for a third time at number 50 on 9 October. On the UK Indie Chart, the song leaped from number 192 to number 30 on 10 October 2009. The following week it rose to number nine, but fell to number 26 the week after. On 14 November 2009, "Stop Crying Your Heart Out" rose from number 85 to number nine again. It feel to number 25 again the following week. On 26 December 2009, it ascended from number 51 to a new peak of number six. On 2 January 2010, it fell from number six to number 22, but rose to number 18 the following week. "Stop Crying Your Heart Out" was certified Silver by the British Phonographic Industry (BPI) on 12 July 2002, denoting shipments of over 200,000 copies.

In Europe, "Stop Crying Your Heart Out" debuted and peaked at number 41 on the Austrian Singles Chart on 7 July 2002. It fell to number 45 in its second week, and to number 62 in its third. However, it ascended to number 56 in its fourth week. It spent a total of five consecutive weeks on the chart. In the Wallonia region of Belgium, the song peaked at number 13 on the Ultratip on 3 August 2002, remaining on the chart for three weeks. The song charted for one week on the Danish Singles Chart at number 17 on 28 June 2002. "Stop Crying Your Heart Out" debuted at number 11 in on the Finnish Singles Chart and fell to number 17 the following week. It peaked at number 48 on the German Singles Chart and at number six on the Irish Singles Chart. In Italy, the song debuted at number one on 20 June 2002. It fell to number five in its second week, and to number 17 in its third week and spent a total of nine weeks on the chart. In the Netherlands, it spent a total of two weeks on the chart: it debuted at number 76 on 6 July 2002 and rose by three positions to number 73 the following week. "Stop Crying Your Heart Out" peaked at number 23 on the Swedish Singles Chart and peaked at number 48 on the Swiss Singles Chart. In 2012, the song debuted and peaked at number 135 on the French Singles Chart for one week. Outside of Europe, the song peaked at number nine on the Canadian Singles Chart and number 48 on the Australian Singles Chart.

== Track listings ==
- CD single and digital EP
1. "Stop Crying Your Heart Out" – 5:02
2. "Thank You for the Good Times" (Andy Bell) – 4:32
3. "Shout It Out Loud" – 4:20
- DVD (RKIDSDVD 24)
1. "Stop Crying Your Heart Out" – 5:03
2. "Stop Crying Your Heart Out" (demo) – 5:09
3. 10 Minutes of Noise and Confusion part two – 7:24
- The demo version of "Stop Crying Your Heart Out" is sung by Noel.
- The 10 Minutes... documentary is the second part of a unique feature covering 48 hours on the road with Oasis during the Tour of Brotherly Love which took place in the US with the Black Crowes during May and June 2001.

== Credits and personnel ==
Credits are adapted from the liner notes of Heathen Chemistry.

Recording

- Recorded at Wheeler End and Olympic Studios, England.

Oasis

- Liam Gallagher – lead vocals, backing vocals, tambourine
- Noel Gallagher – electric guitar, backing vocals
- Gem Archer – acoustic guitar
- Andy Bell – bass
- Alan White – drums

Additional performer

- Mike Rowe – piano

== Charts ==
=== Weekly charts ===
Weekly chart performance for "Stop Crying Your Heart Out"
Chart (2002)	Peak position
Australia (ARIA)	48
Austria (Ö3 Austria Top 40)	41
Belgium (Ultratip Bubbling Under Wallonia)	13
Canada (Nielsen SoundScan)	6
Denmark (Tracklisten)	17
Europe (Eurochart Hot 100)	9
Finland (Suomen virallinen lista)	11
Germany (GfK)	48
Hungary (Single Top 40)	9
Ireland (IRMA)	6
Italy (FIMI)	1
Netherlands (Single Top 100)	73
Norway (VG-lista)	13
Scotland Singles (Official Charts)	2
Spain (Promusicae)	6
Sweden (Sverigetopplistan)	23
Switzerland (Schweizer Hitparade)	48
UK Singles (Official Charts)	2

Chart (2009–2010)	Peak position
UK Singles (Official Charts)	50
UK Indie (Official Charts)	6

Chart (2012)	Peak position
France (SNEP)	135

=== Year-end charts ===
Year-end chart performance for "Stop Crying Your Heart Out"
Chart (2002)	Position
Canada (Nielsen SoundScan)	31
Ireland (IRMA)	97
Italy (FIMI)	38
UK Singles (OCC)	50
UK Airplay (Music Week)	61

== Certifications ==
Certifications for "Stop Crying Your Heart Out"
Region	Certification	Certified units/sales
Australia (ARIA)	Gold	35,000^{‡}
Brazil (Pro-Música Brasil)	Platinum	60,000^{‡}
Italy (FIMI)	Gold	50,000^{‡}
New Zealand (RMNZ)	Gold	15,000^{‡}
Spain (Promusicae)	Gold	30,000^{‡}
United Kingdom (BPI)	2× Platinum	1,200,000^{‡}
^{‡} Sales+streaming figures based on certification alone.

== Release history ==
Release dates and formats for "Stop Crying Your Heart Out"
Region	Date	Format(s)	Label(s)	Ref.
United States	28 May 2002	Alternative; triple A radio	Epic	
United Kingdom	17 June 2002	7-inch vinyl; CD; DVD	Big Brother	
Japan	19 June 2000	CD	Epic	
United Kingdom	24 June 2002	12-inch vinyl	Big Brother	
Australia	29 July 2002	CD	Helter Skelter	

== Legacy ==
Just days after release, the song was used for the closing BBC montage following England's defeat to Brazil in the 2002 World Cup quarter-final. The song was used as the ending theme for the 2004 film The Butterfly Effect and the pilot episode of Birds of Prey. It has also been featured in the film Made of Honor, and in the end credits of the 2025 biopic I Swear.

=== Leona Lewis version ===
"Stop Crying Your Heart Out"

Song by Leona Lewis

from the album Echo
- Released: 9 November 2009
- Length: 4:08
- Label: Sony; Syco
- Songwriter: Noel Gallagher
- Producers: Steve Robson; Leona Lewis

Audio
- "Stop Crying Your Heart Out" on YouTube

"Stop Crying Your Heart Out" was covered by English singer-songwriter Leona Lewis for her second studio album, Echo (2009).

==== Background and recording ====
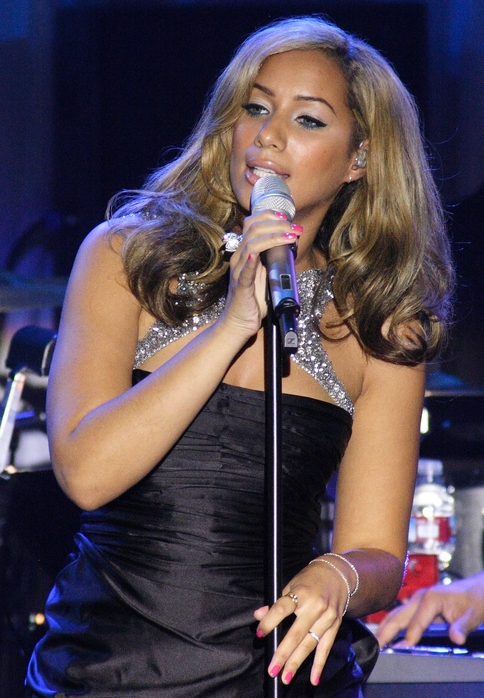
Lewis (pictured) revealed that she decided to record a cover version of Oasis' "Stop Crying Your Heart Out" because she is a fan of the band.

In an interview with Rick Edwards titled Under the Skin of Leona Lewis on 28 February 2010 for 4Music, Lewis revealed that she is a fan of Oasis and that "Stop Crying Your Heart Out" is a "great song" with a "beautiful sentiment behind it". She continued to say herself and label boss Simon Cowell discussed the possibility of Lewis recording a discussed cover version. Lewis cited her reason for wishing to record her own version as being a "massive" fan of rock bands, and that she wanted to put a "different spin on it". When asked the question of if she knew what Gallagher thought about her version, she replied saying that she had not spoken to them and that she did not know if they had listened to her version. Originally written solely by Gallagher, Lewis's cover version was produced by Steve Robson. Both Robson and Lewis were the vocal producers on "Stop Crying Your Heart Out". It was engineered by Richard Flack, who was assisted in the process by vocal engineer Seth Waldmann. It was mixed by Jeremy Wheatly at Twenty-One Studios, located in London, England. A range of instrumentalists were bought in for the song; Karl Brazil played the drums, while Luke Potashnick provided guitar. John Garrison played the bass and Robson the piano. The London Session Orchestra performed the strings on "Stop Crying Your Heart Out" and it was arranged by Will Malone, while the choir was organised and arranged by Lawrence Johnson. Background vocals were performed by Sara-Jane Skeet and Beverly Skeet.

==== Composition and critical reception ====
"Stop Crying Your Heart Out" appears as the tenth track on Echo and lasts for a duration of four minutes and eight seconds. However, it is not included on the North American version of the album. The structure of the song is not conventional in its style, as most songs have gained momentum by the first chorus. However, Lewis's version of "Stop Crying Your Heart Out" remains down-tempo for the majority of the song. Andy Gill for The Independent noted that it does not possess the "rapidly acquiring melodramatic heft and momentum by the first refrain".

Lewis's version of "Stop Crying Your Heart Out" garnered mostly negative reviews from music critics. Nick Levine for Digital Spy complimented her version, writing that it is "as satisfying as a sponge pudding on a chilly winter evening". Michael Cragg for musicOMH wrote that "Stop Crying Your Heart Out" is another song to be given the "Leona treatment", and compared it to her cover of Snow Patrol's "Run", which she recorded for her inclusion on her debut studio album, Spirit. He felt that her cover of Oasis's song appeared to serve as a "replacement" for covering Snow Patrol. He continued to criticise the production and vocal performance of Lewis's version, writing "On this occasion the kitchen-sink style production – stirring strings, acoustic strums, and inevitable appearance of a choir – feels hollow, like being aurally attacked by a (admittedly very impressive) karaoke singer". As part of his review of Echo, Matthew Cole for Slant Magazine wrote that too much of the album is dominated by "thoughtless" ballads, which he highlighted in the form of "Don't Let Me Down" and "Stop Crying Your Heart Out". While he noted that Lewis gives a "technically unimpeachable" vocal performance, he wrote that it does not compensate for the "dull arrangement" and lack of emotion in her delivery. Andy Gill for The Independent described her cover as "sententious". Neil McCormick for The Telegraph was critical of her decision to cover the song, writing that she is too emotive for the "direct and simple" lyrics, and concluded by saying that her version does not compare to Gallagher's "raw-throated sincerity".

==== Chart performance ====
Upon the release of Echo, "Stop Crying Your Heart Out" debuted at number 55 on the UK Singles Chart due to strong digital download sales on 28 November 2009. Following Lewis's performance on The X Factor finale, the song re-entered the singles chart at number 29 on 26 December 2009, rising 101 chart positions from the previous week. On 4 September 2010, the song re-entered the UK Singles Chart for a third time at number 63. On 19 December 2009, the song rose from number 41 to number 34 on the UK R&B Chart. The following week on 26 December, it ascended to number 11. On 2 January 2010, it fell to number 15, and again to number 34 the next week. It remained inside the top 40 R&B chart for a further two weeks. The same week on the UK Download Chart, the song leaped from number 114 to number 27 for the chart issue dated 26 December 2009. In Scotland, the song rose from number 74 to number 24 on 26 December 2009. In the first week of 2010, it feel to number 36. In Ireland, the song debut and peaked at number 31 on 19 December 2009. Over the following two weeks, it fell to number 33, and again to number 48 before exiting the top 50.

==== Live performances ====
On 3 December 2009, Lewis performed her version on the BBC Radio 2 show Live Sessions with Ken Bruce, as part of a set list which also included "Bleeding Love", "Better In Time", "Happy" and "I Got You". She performed an acoustic version of the song on MTV Unplugged in Germany. A reviewer for Neon Limelight felt that her acoustic performance lacked emotion and passion. The singer performed the song again on the sixth series finale of The X Factor in December 2009. On 21 January 2010, Lewis performed "Stop Crying Your Heart Out" and "I Got You" on BBC Radio 1's Live Lounge.

==== Weekly charts ====
Weekly chart performance for "Stop Crying Your Heart Out"
Chart (2009–2010)	Peak position
Ireland (IRMA)	31
Scotland Singles (Official Charts)	24
UK Singles Downloads (Official Charts)	27
UK Hip Hop/R&B (Official Charts)	11
UK Singles (Official Charts)	29

=== BBC Radio 2 Allstars charity single ===
"Stop Crying Your Heart Out"

Single by BBC Radio 2 Allstars
- Released: 13 November 2020
- Venue: Households of various artists
- Length: 3:43
- Label: BBC; Decca; Universal
- Songwriter: Noel Gallagher
- Producers: Brian Rawling; Mark Taylor

Music video
- "Stop Crying Your Heart Out" (Radio 2 Allstars) on YouTube

On 10 November 2020, BBC Radio 2 announced that a cover version of "Stop Crying Your Heart Out" performed by the charity supergroup BBC Radio 2 Allstars would be released as the official single for that year's BBC Children in Need appeal. Each member recorded and filmed their contribution to the song from their respective households to encourage social distancing during the COVID-19 pandemic. The song was released on 13 November 2020 and the music video premiered during BBC One's Children in Need telethon on the same day. All Net Profits from sales of the single were donated to BBC Children in Need.

==== Artists ====
The song was performed by the following artists (in alphabetical order):

- Bryan Adams
- Izzy Bizu
- Grace Chatto (of Clean Bandit)
- Cher
- Melanie C
- Jamie Cullum
- Ella Eyre
- Paloma Faith
- Rebecca Ferguson
- Jess Glynne
- Lenny Kravitz
- KSI
- Lauv
- Ava Max
- Kylie Minogue
- James Morrison
- Gregory Porter
- Nile Rodgers
- Jack Savoretti
- Jay Sean
- Anoushka Shankar
- Robbie Williams
- Yola

==== Charts ====
Weekly chart performance for "Stop Crying Your Heart Out"
Chart (2020–2021)	Peak position
Euro Digital Song Sales (Billboard)	1
Global Excl. US (Billboard)	114
Slovakia Airplay (ČNS IFPI)	85
UK Singles (Official Charts)	7

== See also ==
- List of UK top-ten singles in 2020
- List of UK Singles Downloads Chart number ones of the 2020s
