= She Is Love =

2002 song by Oasis

Single by Oasis

from the album Heathen Chemistry
- A-side: "Little by Little"
- B-side: "My Generation"
- Released: 19 September 2002
- Length: 3:11
- Label: Big Brother
- Songwriter: Noel Gallagher
- Producer: Oasis

Oasis singles chronology
"Stop Crying Your Heart Out" (2002)	"Little by Little" / "She Is Love" (2002)	"Songbird" (2003)

Audio video
- "She Is Love" on YouTube

"She Is Love" is a song by English rock band Oasis, first released as the ninth track on their fifth studio album, Heathen Chemistry (2002), written and sung by lead guitarist Noel Gallagher. It was released with "Little by Little" as the only double A-sided single by the band on 19 September 2002, peaking at number two on the UK Singles Chart. The song was written about Noel Gallagher's girlfriend Sara McDonald and is a light, acoustic song about being in love.

Gallagher claimed it was written in the Buckingham Gate Hotel in London, and that it took 30 minutes to complete. The band commissioned British fashion art director Rachel Thomas to make a promo video for the song. However, the resulting film, a mix of animation and live action, has never been released on any format. This track is also included on the compilation album Time Flies... 1994–2009 (2010).

== Inspiration ==
It appears that Gallagher borrowed sentiments from Khalil Gibran's book The Prophet.

"When love beckons to you, follow him, Though his ways are hard and steep. And when his wings enfold you yield to him, though the sword hidden among his pinions may wound you."

John Lennon also borrowed from the same author for his song "Julia".

== Track listings ==
- 7-inch (RKID 26), CD (RKIDSCD 26), 12-inch (RKID 26T)
1. "Little by Little" – 4:57
2. "She Is Love" – 3:11
3. "My Generation" – 4:05 (CD and 12" only)
  - "My Generation" was recorded live at the BBC's Maida Vale studios on 20 January 2000. The sleevenotes claim it was recorded on 7 February 2000 but this was the transmission date, not the recording date.
- DVD (RKIDSDVD 26)
1. "Little by Little" – 5:02
2. "Little by Little" (demo) – 4:55
3. 10 minutes of noise and confusion – pt three – 8:31
  - The third part of the "10 Minutes..." documentary looks behind the scenes of their sell out shows at Finsbury Park in London from 5 to 7 July 2002.

== Personnel ==
- Noel Gallagher – lead vocals, acoustic guitar, electric guitar
- Gem Archer – acoustic guitar
- Alan White – tambourine, handclaps
- Mike Rowe – pump organ, Hammond organ

== Charts ==
All entries charted with "Little by Little".

=== Weekly charts ===
Chart (2002)	Peak position
Australia (ARIA)	54
Europe (Eurochart Hot 100)	11
Ireland (IRMA)	9
Scotland Singles (OCC)	2
UK Singles (OCC)	2

=== Year-end charts ===
Chart (2002)	Position
UK Singles (OCC)	81

== Release history ==
Region	Date	Format(s)	Label(s)	Ref(s).
Japan	19 September 2002	CD	Epic	
Denmark	23 September 2002	CD	Helter Skelter	
United Kingdom	23 September 2002	7-inch vinyl; CD	Big Brother	
Australia	14 October 2002	CD	Helter Skelter	
