= The Importance of Being Idle (book) =

2000 book by Stephen Robins

The Importance of Being Idle: A Little Book of Lazy Inspiration
- Author: Stephen Robins
- Language: English
- Publisher: Prion Books
- Publication date: August 2000

The Importance of Being Idle: A Little Book of Lazy Inspiration is a humorous self-help book by author Stephen Robins. It was published by Prion Books in August 2000 and re-released as a paperback in 2001. Using an alphabetic subject-list format, it presents a collection of essay-extracts, quotations and journal excerpts from a wide variety of writers and thinkers, including Mark Twain, Bertrand Russell, Charles Dickens, and Samuel Johnson. The book describes itself as 'call to arms for would-be loafers everywhere to turn their hands to absolutely nothing whatever', emphasizing the benefits of giving oneself nothing to do in the modern world of stress and long working hours. In the words of James Thurber, "It is better to have loafed and lost than never to have loafed at all".

The song of the same name by English rock band Oasis is named after the book.

== See also ==
- Karōshi
