= Little by Little (Oasis song) =

2002 single by Oasis

Single by Oasis

from the album Heathen Chemistry
- A-side: "She Is Love"
- B-side: "My Generation"
- Released: 19 September 2002
- Genre: Rock
- Length: 4:54
- Label: Big Brother
- Songwriter: Noel Gallagher
- Producer: Oasis

Oasis singles chronology
"Stop Crying Your Heart Out" (2002)	"Little by Little" / "She Is Love" (2002)	"Songbird" (2003)

Music video
- "Oasis - Little By Little (Official Video)" on YouTube

"Little by Little" is a song by English rock band Oasis, first released as the sixth track on their fifth studio album, Heathen Chemistry. In September 2002, it was released with "She Is Love" as the only double A-side single by the band, peaking at number two on the UK Singles Chart and number nine on the Irish Singles Chart. "Little by Little" by itself reached number two on the Canadian Singles Chart and number five in Italy. Noel Gallagher provides lead vocals on both tracks, which he also wrote.

The promo video to the song featured a guest role by Robert Carlyle. The cover art for the single is an homage to Robert Indiana's Love artwork series.

== Background ==
Liam Gallagher was originally meant to record lead vocals for "Little by Little", but according to Noel, he could not manage it. "It's a shame 'cos that would have made it extra, extra special. When it came to him (recording the vocals) you could see he was going, 'I'm not going to fucking get it.' And we were all willing him to get it. I went in and did a version and you could see he was sat at the desk going, 'Fucking bastard. He's got it.' But he doesn't want to do anything that's shit."

== Music video ==
There are two versions of the music video, one being Noel Gallagher sitting on a doorstep singing and playing guitar as people (including Gem Archer) throw money to him. A small man (played by Robert Carlyle) mimes to Gallagher. It then shows Carlyle's character at a bus stop with Alan White and then grows to normal size and trips over but is helped up by Liam Gallagher. Carlyle's character is then last seen growing to giant size, walking into a forest and then into farmland. The alternate version shows the band playing in a concert at Finsbury Park in 2002.

== Live performances ==
The first performance on the song was on 23 May, 2002, at Zepp Tokyo, Tokyo, Japan, and it quickly became a favourite for the band to play in concert. While it appeared irregularly following the Heathen Chemistry Tour before being dropped completely in 2005, it has been performed many times by Noel Gallagher's High Flying Birds, and is notable for being the only song from an album made by Oasis in the 2000s to be on their Live '25 setlist, all the others being from either the first three albums made in the 1990s (Definitely Maybe, (What's the Story) Morning Glory? and Be Here Now), or the 1998 compilation The Masterplan.

== Track listings ==
- UK 7-inch single and European CD single (RKID 26; HES 673068 1)
1. "Little by Little"
2. "She Is Love"
- UK 12-inch and CD single, Australian CD single (RKID 26T; RKIDSCD26; 673068.2)
1. "Little by Little"
2. "She Is Love"
3. "My Generation"
- UK and European DVD single (RKIDSDVD 26; HES 673068 8)
1. "Little by Little"
2. "Little by Little" (demo)
3. 10 Minutes of Noise and Confusion Pt. 3 (Finsbury Park, London, July 2002)
- European CD single—Special Tour Edition (HES 673068 5)
1. "Little by Little"
2. "My Generation"
3. "Columbia" (live)
4. "Little by Little" (live video) (Finsbury Park, London, July 2002)

== Personnel ==
Oasis

- Noel Gallagher – lead vocals and acoustic guitar
- Gem Archer – electric guitar
- Andy Bell – bass
- Alan White – drums and tambourine

Additional musicians

- Paul Stacey – organ

== Charts ==
=== Weekly charts ===
Weekly chart performance for "Little by Little"
Chart (2002)	Peak position
Canada (Nielsen SoundScan)	2
Finland (Suomen virallinen lista)	16
Germany (GfK)	65
Italy (FIMI)	5
New Zealand (Recorded Music NZ)	46
Spain (Promusicae)	20
Sweden (Sverigetopplistan)	41
Switzerland (Schweizer Hitparade)	83

Weekly chart performance for "Little by Little" / "She Is Love"
Chart (2002)	Peak position
Australia (ARIA)	54
Europe (Eurochart Hot 100)	11
Ireland (IRMA)	9
Scotland Singles (OCC)	2
UK Singles (OCC)	2

=== Year-end charts ===
Year-end chart performance for "Little by Little"
Chart (2002)	Position
Canada (Nielsen SoundScan)	47
UK Singles (OCC)	81
UK Airplay (Music Week)	59

== Certifications ==
Certifications and sales for "Little by Little"
Region	Certification	Certified units/sales
United Kingdom (BPI)	Platinum	600,000^{‡}
^{‡} Sales+streaming figures based on certification alone.

== Release history ==
Release dates and formats for "Little by Little"
Region	Date	Format(s)	Label(s)	Ref(s).
Japan	19 September 2002	CD	Epic	
Denmark	23 September 2002	CD	Helter Skelter	
United Kingdom	23 September 2002	7-inch vinyl; CD	Big Brother	
Australia	14 October 2002	CD	Helter Skelter	
