= Heathen Chemistry =

Studio album by Oasis
- Released: 1 July 2002
- Recorded: 2001–2002
- Studios: Wheeler End, Buckinghamshire and Olympic, London
- Genres: Alternative rock; pop rock
- Length: 76:36 (Note: 47:54 excluding the silence before the hidden track)
- Label: Big Brother
- Producer: Oasis

Oasis chronology
Familiar to Millions (2000)	Heathen Chemistry (2002)	Don't Believe the Truth (2005)

Singles from Heathen Chemistry
- 1. "The Hindu Times" Released: 15 April 2002; 2. "Stop Crying Your Heart Out" Released: 28 May 2002; 3. "Little by Little" / "She Is Love" Released: 19 September 2002; 4. "Songbird" Released: 3 February 2003

Heathen Chemistry is the fifth studio album by English rock band Oasis. It was released on 1 July 2002 by Big Brother Recordings. It is the first Oasis studio album recorded with guitarist Gem Archer and bassist Andy Bell, who both joined the band after the previous album Standing on the Shoulder of Giants had been completed. It is the last Oasis album to feature longtime drummer Alan White, who left in early 2004, due to what Noel Gallagher cited as White's lack of commitment to the band. Heathen Chemistry is notable for being the first Oasis album where members other than Noel Gallagher made a significant contribution to the songwriting, a trend which would continue in subsequent Oasis albums.

Heathen Chemistry was recorded at Wheeler End Studios and Olympic Studios in London. The album marked a change in sound from the band's previous album, the more psychedelic sounding Standing on the Shoulder of Giants, and the grand production and massive sound on the band's third album Be Here Now. Instead, it has a more back-to-basics rock sound found on the band's first two studio albums.

Heathen Chemistry features the UK number one hit "The Hindu Times", as well as the singles "Little By Little"/"She Is Love" (which was the band's only double–A side single), "Stop Crying Your Heart Out" and "Songbird", which was the first Oasis single written by Liam Gallagher. The four singles were all top five hits in the UK. This was the last Oasis studio album to include four singles released in the UK.

Upon release, Heathen Chemistry received mixed reviews but was a commercial success, going to number one on the UK Albums Chart and reaching the top 10 in a dozen other countries. The album was certified 4× platinum by the British Phonographic Industry (BPI) for sales of 1.2 million units.

== Recording ==
Heathen Chemistry was recorded between 2001 and early 2002 and is the first Oasis album to have significant writing contributions from members other than chief songwriter Noel Gallagher. Frontman Liam Gallagher contributed three songs, with new bassist Andy Bell and rhythm guitarist Gem Archer each contributing one song each.

Although most of the songs' instrumentation was complete by mid-to-late 2001, Noel indicated that the release date of the album was being needlessly delayed by Liam's apparent reluctance to lay down his vocal parts at recording sessions, and went on to state that he was "livid" at the lack of work being done:

I was really happy with (the album) until recently, but I'm fucking livid now. I finished my bits three-and-a-half months ago, and then we handed it over to Liam, and in three-and-a-half months he's done nothing. Just concentrated on his drinking habit again. It's just drifting at the moment.

All the backing tracks are done and it's a fantastic album of instrumentals. Hand it over to the singer and it just slows down and becomes this one really long, drawn-out, painful process. So, to be honest with you, I don't know when it'll come out now. It's down to him.

Despite the setbacks during the recording process, when the album was finally complete Noel was confident that it was the group's second-best album to date, behind their debut Definitely Maybe.

The title of the album, according to Noel, came from a T-shirt he bought in Ibiza which featured a logo reading, "The Society of Heathen Chemists". Similarly, the name of the first single, "The Hindu Times", originated from a logo on a T-shirt that read the same thing, which Noel saw during a photo shoot for GQ's "100 Greatest Guitarists" edition. The name was given to the track when it was just an instrumental and the name stuck once the track was finished.

== Cover ==
The cover was shot by photographer Andrew Macpherson, who was commissioned by Simon Halfon to spend a week in Paris with the band in February 2002. The photograph depicts an informal moment as the band members wait for a subway train at the Gare de Lyon Métro station, on 13 February 2002.

== Release ==
Heathen Chemistry's release was overshadowed by an Internet leak of all 11 songs almost three months prior to release, which was evident at a Las Vegas show the group performed where fans knew the words to several new songs before the album's release. However, listeners of the commercially released album heard slight differences to two tracks, "Little by Little" and "Better Man".

The album was certified four times platinum selling over 1.2 million in the UK, and 154,000 copies in the US. Upon release, Heathen Chemistry went straight to number one in the UK, though it fared rather poorly in the US, only entering at number 23.

It spawned four singles, each of which made the top three in the UK charts: "The Hindu Times", their sixth number one single in the UK; "Stop Crying Your Heart Out"; "Little By Little/She Is Love", the double A-side sung by Noel Gallagher; and "Songbird", the first single written by Liam.

== Reception ==
Professional ratings
Aggregate scores
Source	Rating
Metacritic	55/100
Review scores
Source	Rating
AllMusic	3/5 stars
Blender	4/5 stars
Entertainment Weekly	B−
The Guardian	2/5 stars
Los Angeles Times	2/4 stars
NME	8/10
Pitchfork	1.2/10
Q	2/5 stars
Rolling Stone	3/5 stars
Spin	4/10

Heathen Chemistry received mixed reviews upon release, although it was seen as a return to form from critics following the reviews of the two previous albums. On Metacritic, it has a score of 55 out of 100, based on reviews from 22 critics. Some reviewers noted that it was better than the band's last effort, Standing on the Shoulder of Giants, with Blender writing that Oasis was "a band back on track". NME gave it an 8/10 rating and Rolling Stone gave it three out of five stars. However, a number of other reviewers offered scathing assessments of the album; notably, Drowned in Sound, Pitchfork, and Stylus Magazine.

In 2017, Liam Gallagher ranked Heathen Chemistry as his least favourite Oasis album.

== Track listing ==
The eleventh track, "Better Man", is followed by thirty minutes of silence before a hidden track, "The Cage", is played.

Heathen Chemistry track listing
No.	Title	Writer(s)	Length
1.	"The Hindu Times"	Noel Gallagher	3:46
2.	"Force of Nature"	N. Gallagher	4:51
3.	"Hung in a Bad Place"	Gem Archer	3:28
4.	"Stop Crying Your Heart Out"	N. Gallagher	5:03
5.	"Songbird"	Liam Gallagher	2:07
6.	"Little by Little"	N. Gallagher	4:52
7.	"A Quick Peep"	Andy Bell	1:17
8.	"(Probably) All in the Mind"	N. Gallagher	4:02
9.	"She Is Love"	N. Gallagher	3:09
10.	"Born on a Different Cloud"	L. Gallagher	6:08
11.	"Better Man"	L. Gallagher	4:20
12.	"The Cage" (hidden track)	N. Gallagher	38:02 (Note: Includes 30 minutes of silence)
Total length:			76:36

The Japanese and digital versions removed the 30-minute silence between "Better Man" and "The Cage", and featured an additional track.

Japanese and digital version
No.	Title	Writer(s)	Length
12.	"The Cage"	N. Gallagher	4:50
13.	"(You've Got) the Heart of a Star"	N. Gallagher	5:24
Total length:			53:18

== Personnel ==
=== Oasis ===
- Liam Gallagher – vocals, tambourine, acoustic guitar
- Noel Gallagher – guitar, keyboards, backing vocals, lead vocals (2, 6, 9)
- Gem Archer – guitar, keyboards, backing vocals
- Andy Bell – bass guitar
- Alan White – drums, percussion

=== Additional musicians ===
- Paul Stacey – Mellotron (track 1), piano (tracks 2, 3, 11), Hammond organ (track 6)
- Mike Rowe – piano (tracks 4, 10), pump organ (tracks 5, 9), Hammond organ (tracks 8–10)
- Johnny Marr – guitar solo (track 8), slide guitar (track 10), guitar and backing vocals (track 11)
- London Session Orchestra – strings (track 4)

== Charts ==
=== Weekly charts ===
Chart performance for Heathen Chemistry
Chart (2002)	Peak position
Argentine Albums (CAPIF)	2
Australian Albums (ARIA)	4
Austrian Albums (Ö3 Austria)	4
Belgian Albums (Ultratop Flanders)	25
Belgian Albums (Ultratop Wallonia)	8
Canadian Albums (Billboard)	5
Danish Albums (Hitlisten)	8
Dutch Albums (Album Top 100)	32
European Albums (Music & Media)	2
Finnish Albums (Suomen virallinen lista)	5
French Albums (SNEP)	8
German Albums (Offizielle Top 100)	4
Hungarian Albums (MAHASZ)	39
Irish Albums (IRMA)	1
Italian Albums (FIMI)	2
Japanese Albums (Oricon)	3
New Zealand Albums (RMNZ)	16
Norwegian Albums (VG-lista)	3
Polish Albums (ZPAV)	27
Scottish Albums (Official Charts)	1
Spanish Albums (PROMUSICAE)	12
Swedish Albums (Sverigetopplistan)	2
Swiss Albums (Schweizer Hitparade)	1
UK Albums (Official Charts)	1
US Billboard 200	23

=== Year-end charts ===
2002 year-end chart performance for Heathen Chemistry
Chart (2002)	Position
Canadian Alternative Albums (Nielsen SoundScan)	67
European Albums (Music & Media)	30
German Albums (Offizielle Top 100)	82
Italian Albums (FIMI)	40
Swiss Albums (Schweizer Hitparade)	33
UK Albums (OCC)	10
Worldwide Albums (IFPI)	44

2003 year-end chart performance for Heathen Chemistry
Chart (2003)	Position
UK Albums (OCC)	134

== Certifications and sales ==
Certifications and sales for Heathen Chemistry
Region	Certification	Certified units/sales
Argentina (CAPIF)	Gold	20,000^{^}
Australia (ARIA)	Gold	35,000^{^}
Canada (Music Canada)	Gold	50,000^{^}
Hong Kong (IFPI Hong Kong)	Platinum	20,000^{*}
Japan (RIAJ)	Platinum	200,000^{^}
Sweden (GLF)	Gold	30,000^{^}
Switzerland (IFPI Switzerland)	Gold	20,000^{^}
United Kingdom (BPI)	4× Platinum	1,200,000^{‡}
United States	—	154,000
^{*} Sales figures based on certification alone.^{^} Shipments figures based on certification alone.^{‡} Sales+streaming figures based on certification alone.
