= Songbird (Oasis song) =

2003 single by Oasis

Single by Oasis

from the album Heathen Chemistry
- B-side: "(You've Got) The Heart of a Star"; "Columbia" (live)
- Released: 3 February 2003
- Genre: Folk rock; country rock
- Length: 2:08; 2:47 (music video)
- Label: Big Brother
- Songwriter: Liam Gallagher
- Producer: Oasis

Oasis singles chronology
"Little by Little" / "She Is Love" (2002)	"Songbird" (2003)	"Lyla" (2005)

Music video
- "Oasis - Songbird (Official Video)" on YouTube

"Songbird" is a song by English rock band Oasis from their fifth studio album, Heathen Chemistry (2002), and is the first single by Oasis written by vocalist Liam Gallagher. Released on 3 February 2003, the song reached number three on the UK Singles Chart, number two on the Canadian Singles Chart, and the top 10 in Ireland and Italy.

== Composition ==
Liam has said of the song: "I like beautiful things... It's not all dark in Liam World. I take me shades off every now and again and have a look at the world and see some nice things." Noel Gallagher stated jokingly in an interview with Patrick Kielty that Liam decided to "write a song about his bird", and states the title "Song... bird" in a cave man like manner. The song was written as a tribute to then-fiancée Nicole Appleton. "Songbird" was composed in the key of G major using common time at 132 beats per minute.

Songbird blew my head off when I first heard it because it was that f—king simple and that direct. But when Liam plays you a song he wants you to instantly f—king drop dead on the spot and then, when you come around, stab yourself in the heart and be in awe of the f—king sonic ability of the man.

— Noel Gallagher

During an interview with The Matt Morgan Podcast, Liam's brother and bandmate Noel Gallagher called the track a "perfect" song.

== Release and other versions ==
The song was released as the fourth single from the band's Heathen Chemistry album, on 3 February 2003 and peaked at number three on the UK Singles Chart. It is the only track from Heathen Chemistry included on the band's first greatest hits album Stop the Clocks, as well as the only track written by Liam included on it. Being written by lead singer Liam Gallagher, it was the first time the band had released a single not written by his brother Noel. "(You've Got) The Heart of the Star" and "Columbia" are B-sides, the latter of which was recorded live at the Glasgow Barrowlands, in October 2001.

The demo of the song is a typical Oasis approach to the song, featuring overdriven guitar and a stronger beat, as well as a guitar solo. Courtney Love has said that she and Liam played a version with her whistling and Gallagher playing guitar and singing, this was noted in the book Kurt and Courtney: Talking. Gallagher played the song for UK Radio Aid in January 2005.

In December 2017, Irish music school The Music Yard used the song's melody for their Christmas song "Talking to a Snowman".

== Critical reception ==
Doug Levy for CMJ New Music Report said that Gallagher had a "surprising talent for songwriting", referring to "Songbird" and album tracks "Better Man" and "Born on a Different Cloud". Spin magazine's Chuck Klosterman said "Songbird" was one of the two "most compelling songs" on the album.

== Music video ==
The video features Liam performing the song in Hyde Park in London, whilst playing an acoustic guitar under a tree, and alternately chasing and being chased by a dog. The video also has an appearance by Appleton.

== Track listings ==
- 7-inch single

A. "Songbird"
B. "(You've Got) The Heart of a Star"

- UK CD and 12-inch single
1. "Songbird"
2. "(You've Got) The Heart of a Star"
3. "Columbia" (live)
- UK DVD single
1. "Songbird"
2. "Songbird" (demo)
3. Exclusive interview and live performance footage
- Japanese maxi-CD single
1. "Songbird"
2. "Songbird" (demo)
3. "Columbia" (live)

== Charts ==
=== Weekly charts ===
Chart (2003)	Peak position
Canada (Nielsen SoundScan)	2
Europe (Eurochart Hot 100)	12
Germany (GfK)	81
Ireland (IRMA)	10
Italy (FIMI)	6
Scottish Singles Sales (Official Charts)	1
Sweden (Sverigetopplistan)	44
Switzerland (Schweizer Hitparade)	94
UK Singles (Official Charts)	3

=== Year-end charts ===
Chart (2003)	Position
UK Singles (OCC)	72

== Certifications ==
Region	Certification	Certified units/sales
United Kingdom (BPI)	Platinum	600,000^{‡}
^{‡} Sales+streaming figures based on certification alone.

== Release history ==
Region	Date	Format(s)	Label(s)	Ref.
United Kingdom	3 February 2003	7-inch vinyl; CD	Big Brother	
United Kingdom	10 February 2003	12-inch vinyl	Big Brother	
Japan	19 February 2003	CD	Epic	
