= Don't Believe the Truth =

Studio album by Oasis
- Released: 30 May 2005
- Recorded: October – December 2004
- Studios: Metropolis (London); Olympic (London); Strangeways (London); Wheeler End (Buckinghamshire); Capitol (Hollywood); The Village (Los Angeles)
- Genres: Alternative rock; indie rock
- Length: 42:52
- Label: Big Brother
- Producers: Dave Sardy; Noel Gallagher

Oasis chronology
Heathen Chemistry (2002)	Don't Believe the Truth (2005)	Stop the Clocks (2006)

Singles from Don't Believe the Truth
- 1. "Lyla" Released: 11 May 2005; 2. "The Importance of Being Idle" Released: 22 August 2005; 3. "Let There Be Love" Released: 28 November 2005

Don't Believe the Truth is the sixth studio album by English rock band Oasis. It was released on 30 May 2005 by Big Brother Recordings. It reached number one in the UK Albums Chart with first week sales of 237,865, and is the 32nd fastest selling album ever in the UK. The album entered the US charts at number 12, with 65,000 copies sold in the first week, the highest any Oasis album had reached there since 1997's Be Here Now, although its chart stay was brief. Don't Believe the Truth went triple platinum in the UK in the first week of 2006 (1,000,000+ sales), and in the US has sold more than 200,000 copies.

As with the previous album, Don't Believe the Truth had significant writing contributions from members other than chief songwriter Noel Gallagher, and the album is the first where all duties were divided between the band members. On some tracks, regular bass player Andy Bell handled guitar, while Gem Archer and Noel Gallagher contributed bass to other songs. Don't Believe the Truth is the first Oasis record to feature the drumming of Zak Starkey, an auxiliary member of Oasis, who performed and toured with them following the departure of longtime drummer Alan White. The album received positive reviews from critics, and many cited it as Oasis' best album in a decade.

Liam Gallagher also had a larger impact on the album through his developing songwriting. Noel has said that the album is his favourite of Oasis' last four, because all members contributed to it. This, he claims, has given it a different feel from a typically Noel-written Oasis album.

The band embarked on a massive worldwide tour that started off at the London Astoria for their Don't Believe the Truth Tour, visiting 26 countries and playing to 3.2 million people at a total of 113 concerts. This resulted in the making of the film Lord Don't Slow Me Down. To date, the album has sold seven million copies worldwide.

== Recording ==
The recording process for Don't Believe the Truth was prolonged. The album was originally supposed to be released around summer/autumn 2004, with an initial three to four-week session produced by Death in Vegas. The initial sessions finally began in January 2004 at Sawmills Studios in Cornwall, though the group were not satisfied with the results, as Noel Gallagher said: "Unfortunately, after the recording process we decided we didn't like anything we had played/recorded during those three weeks, and because of commitments with Death in Vegas, Richard Fearless and Tim Holmes couldn't find any more time to give to the project."

Noel has commented since on numerous occasions that there was no problem with the work done by Death in Vegas, but he felt the songs they were working on were simply not good enough to form a record, and felt a break was needed in which new material would have to be written. In Noel's words: "We were trying to polish a turd". Around ten songs were worked on with Death in Vegas of which, according to Noel, six were "not even good enough to make the b-sides". Four of the tracks which eventually appeared on the album were worked on with Death in Vegas, those songs being: "Turn Up the Sun", "Mucky Fingers", "A Bell Will Ring" and "The Meaning of Soul", although all of these had extra work done to them or were re-recorded before being released.

After a short break in which many new songs, including "Let There Be Love", "Lyla" and "Part of the Queue" were written, the band reconvened at their Wheeler End Studios with Noel as producer. The band were joined on these sessions by the Who's drummer Zak Starkey. In June 2004, Oasis debuted two new songs from these sessions, the Liam-written "The Meaning of Soul" and the Gem-written "A Bell Will Ring" at two live shows in Poole and at the Glastonbury Festival.

== Release ==
The decision to have the lead-off single, "Lyla", on the album was a controversial one, prompted by the label's feeling that there was not a suitable lead single among the tracks originally presented. As a result, the decision was taken to record "Lyla", a song which Noel had written and demoed a year previously, but which was not recorded by the band during the previous recording sessions. It was decided that Dave Sardy would remix Noel's original demo with Liam recording a set of lead vocals and Zak adding a fresh drum track. "Lyla" reached number one on the UK Singles Chart and number nineteen on the US Hot Modern Rock Tracks chart. After having initial reservations about the choice of the first single being taken out of the hands of the band, Noel, who initially wanted "Mucky Fingers" to be the first single, has now reluctantly conceded that the song has indeed "done the business".

In April 2005, four tracks from a promo disc leaked: "The Meaning of Soul", "Mucky Fingers", "Keep the Dream Alive", and "Let There Be Love". The full album found its way onto the Internet on 3 May 2005 instead of 30 May, when Apple Inc. accidentally put the album up early for sale on their iTunes Music Store service in Germany. While there was no official comment by Apple or by Oasis management, it was speculated that Apple simply got the dates confused.

== Reception ==
Professional ratings
Aggregate scores
Source	Rating
Metacritic	64/100
Review scores
Source	Rating
AllMusic	4/5 stars
Entertainment Weekly	B−
The Guardian	3/5 stars
The Independent	3/5 stars
Mojo	4/5 stars
NME	6/10
Pitchfork	4.7/10
Q	4/5 stars
Rolling Stone	3.5/5 stars
Spin	A−

Don't Believe the Truth received generally positive reviews and was considered a return to form for Oasis, with the songwriting from all band members being praised. With a Metacritic score of 64 out of 100, critics called it the best Oasis album since (What's the Story) Morning Glory?. The album won two Q Awards: a special People's Choice Award and Best Album.

== Legacy ==
The album has been placed on several ranking lists since its release, particularly from British rock and indie music magazines.

- In 2005 it was placed No. 4 in Q Magazine's "Recordings of the Year".
- Also in 2005 it was placed No. 25 in Mojo Magazine's "Recordings of the Year".
- In 2008, Don't Believe the Truth was voted the 14th best British album of all time by a poll conducted by Q Magazine and HMV.
- In 2010, the album was placed as No. 41 on "Top 100 Album's of the 21st Century" list by Q Magazine.
- In February 2011 it was voted No. 86 in "The 250 Best Album's of Q's Lifetime" featuring albums between 1986 and 2011.

In March 2011, NME retrospectively reviewed the album with a highly positive tone, stating the album "introduced a sharper, crisper and occasionally experimental band", and praising the tracks "The Importance of Being Idle" and "Part of the Queue" in particular.

== Track listing ==
Don't Believe the Truth track listing
No.	Title	Writer(s)	Length
1.	"Turn Up the Sun"	Andy Bell	3:59
2.	"Mucky Fingers"	Noel Gallagher	3:56
3.	"Lyla"	N. Gallagher	5:10
4.	"Love Like a Bomb"	Liam Gallagher, Gem Archer	2:52
5.	"The Importance of Being Idle"	N. Gallagher	3:39
6.	"The Meaning of Soul"	L. Gallagher	1:42
7.	"Guess God Thinks I'm Abel"	L. Gallagher	3:24
8.	"Part of the Queue"	N. Gallagher	3:48
9.	"Keep the Dream Alive"	Bell	5:45
10.	"A Bell Will Ring"	Archer	3:07
11.	"Let There Be Love"	N. Gallagher	5:31
Total length:			42:53

Bonus tracks

Japanese version
No.	Title	Writer(s)	Length
12.	"Can Y'See It Now? (I Can See It Now!!)"	N. Gallagher	4:17
13.	"Sitting Here in Silence (On My Own)"	N. Gallagher	2:00
Total length:			48:59

US iTunes version
No.	Title	Writer(s)	Length
12.	"Pass Me Down the Wine"	L. Gallagher	3:50
Total length:			46:43

UK and Canadian iTunes version
No.	Title	Writer(s)	Length
12.	"Eyeball Tickler"	Archer	2:47
Total length:			45:40

== Personnel ==
Oasis

- Liam Gallagher – lead vocals, backing vocals, tambourine, hand claps
- Noel Gallagher – lead guitar, backing vocals, lead vocals on tracks 2, 5, 8, co-lead vocals on 11, producer (tracks 2, 3, 5), drums (track 11)
- Andy Bell – bass guitar, rhythm guitar, acoustic guitar
- Gem Archer – rhythm guitar, lead guitar, bass guitar, keyboards, harmonica, backing vocals (track 6)

Additional personnel

- Zak Starkey – drums, percussion (except track 2), handclaps
- Dave Sardy – mixing (except track 2), producer (tracks 1, 4, 6–11), additional production (track 3)
- Lenny Castro – percussion (track 8)
- Martin Duffy – piano (track 4)
- Terry Kirkbride – drums and percussion (track 2)
- Henry Phillpotts – mixing assistant (track 2)
- Paul 'Strangeboy' Stacey – mixing (track 2), piano and Mellotron (track 11)

== Charts ==
=== Weekly charts ===
Weekly chart performance for Don't Believe the Truth
Chart (2005)	Peak position
Argentine Albums (CAPIF)	1
Australian Albums (ARIA)	5
Austrian Albums (Ö3 Austria)	6
Belgian Albums (Ultratop Flanders)	16
Belgian Albums (Ultratop Wallonia)	12
Canadian Albums (Billboard)	3
Danish Albums (Hitlisten)	12
Dutch Albums (Album Top 100)	11
European Albums (Billboard)	2
Finnish Albums (Suomen virallinen lista)	9
French Albums (SNEP)	5
German Albums (Offizielle Top 100)	2
Irish Albums (IRMA)	1
Italian Albums (FIMI)	1
Japanese Albums (Oricon)	1
New Zealand Albums (RMNZ)	12
Norwegian Albums (VG-lista)	5
Polish Albums (ZPAV)	45
Singaporean Albums (RIAS)	9
Spanish Albums (Promusicae)	9
Swedish Albums (Sverigetopplistan)	3
Swiss Albums (Schweizer Hitparade)	3
UK Albums (Official Charts)	1
US Billboard 200	12

=== Year-end charts ===
Year-end chart performance for Don't Believe the Truth
Chart (2005)	Position
European Albums (Billboard)	48
Italian Albums (FIMI)	58
Japanese Albums (Oricon)	66
Swiss Albums (Schweizer Hitparade)	86
UK Albums (OCC)	13
Worldwide Albums (IFPI)	45

== Sales and certifications ==
Certifications for Don't Believe the Truth
Region	Certification	Certified units/sales
Argentina (CAPIF)	Gold	20,000^{^}
Australia (ARIA)	Gold	35,000^{‡}
Canada (Music Canada)	Gold	50,000^{^}
Ireland (IRMA)	2× Platinum	30,000^{^}
Japan (RIAJ)	Gold	100,000^{^}
South Korea	—	4,284
United Kingdom (BPI)	3× Platinum	900,000^{^}
^{^} Shipments figures based on certification alone.
