= The Importance of Being Idle (song) =

2005 single by Oasis

Single by Oasis

from the album Don't Believe the Truth
- B-side: "Pass Me Down the Wine"; "The Quiet Ones"
- Released: 22 August 2005
- Studio: Wheeler End (Buckinghamshire, England)
- Length: 3:39
- Label: Big Brother
- Songwriter: Noel Gallagher
- Producer: Noel Gallagher

Oasis singles chronology
"Lyla" (2005)	"The Importance of Being Idle" (2005)	"Let There Be Love" (2005)

Official video
- "The Importance of Being Idle" on YouTube

"The Importance of Being Idle" is a song by English rock band Oasis. It was released on 22 August 2005 in the UK as the second single from their sixth studio album, Don't Believe the Truth (2005), written, produced, and sung by lead guitarist Noel Gallagher. The song was written by Gallagher in mid-2004, before the band made their final attempt at recording what would become Don't Believe the Truth.

The song debuted at number one on the UK Singles Chart and stayed there for a week, marking the first time that Oasis had ever earned two successive number ones in the same calendar year (having also charted at number one earlier in 2005 with "Lyla"). "The Importance of Being Idle" would prove to be the band's last UK number one prior to their break-up in 2009. Noel Gallagher got the title from the book of the same name, which he found whilst cleaning out a garage.

== Background ==
In an interview with Q magazine, Noel Gallagher stated that "The Importance of Being Idle" sounds like songs from two British bands, The Kinks and The La's. In particular, the guitar playing, as well as the sentiment expressed, is noticeably similar to The Kinks' "Sunny Afternoon" and "Dead End Street", while the rhythm is similar to that of "Clean Prophet" by the La's. He also said that the lyrics are inspired by his own laziness, stating: "Having nothing to do is such a massive job that someone had to write a song about it." Additionally, the line "I begged my doctor for one more line" may be a reference to Noel's account of how he gave up cocaine in 1998.

== Critical reception ==
Most reviewers acclaimed the track as one of the highlights of Don't Believe the Truth, which itself was widely praised as a return to form. The band mentioned in interviews in June 2005 that it would become the second single. The B-sides are Liam Gallagher's "Pass Me Down the Wine" and Gem Archer's "The Quiet Ones". Q magazine readers placed the song at number one in a list of 2005's greatest tracks. The song was ranked at number 117 in Xfm's 1000 Greatest Songs of All Time list. XFM also placed it at number 48 in their "100 Best Songs of the 2000s" list.

== Music video ==
The promo film was directed by Dawn Shadforth, whose previous videos include Kylie Minogue's award-winning "Can't Get You Out of My Head". Shadforth's film for "The Importance of Being Idle" stars Welsh actor Rhys Ifans and pays homage to the style of early 1960s kitchen sink drama British films, and is set during preparations for a funeral procession in a northern town, with the extravagant undertakers parading the coffin at the video's climax and Ifans playing the part of a high-kicking funeral director whose own funeral it is.

The video is based on the film and play Billy Liar with Ifans playing the role of Billy. The Gallaghers play Shadrack & Duxbury, the owners of the funeral parlour where Billy works. The rest of the band (Gem, Andy and Zak) make brief appearances as lazy workers playing cards in the undertaker's office. The video is similar in style and concept to the black and white 1966 music video for "Dead End Street" by The Kinks. Liam Gallagher's second child, Lennon, cameos in the video.

A short behind-the-scenes documentary of the making of the music video, which was shot partly in Greenwich, was directed by Dick Carruthers. Archer describes it as "the best video I think we've ever done".

== Track listings ==
- UK and Japanese CD single; digital download
1. "The Importance of Being Idle" (Noel Gallagher)
2. "Pass Me Down the Wine" (Liam Gallagher)
3. "The Quiet Ones" (Gem Archer)
- UK DVD single
1. "The Importance of Being Idle"
2. "The Importance of Being Idle" (demo)
3. "The Importance of Being Idle" (video)
4. "The Making Of" (documentary)
- UK 7-inch single and European CD1
1. "The Importance of Being Idle" (N. Gallagher)
2. "Pass Me Down the Wine" (L. Gallagher)
- European CD2
1. "The Importance of Being Idle" (N. Gallagher)
2. "Pass Me Down the Wine" (L. Gallagher)
3. "The Quiet Ones" (Archer)
4. "The Importance of Being Idle" (video clip)

== Personnel ==
- Liam Gallagher – backing vocals, tambourine, hand claps
- Noel Gallagher – vocals, lead guitar
- Andy Bell – bass
- Gem Archer – rhythm guitar, keyboards
- Zak Starkey – drums

== Charts ==
=== Weekly charts ===
Chart (2005)	Peak position
Europe (Eurochart Hot 100)	4
Germany (GfK)	63
Ireland (IRMA)	15
Italy (FIMI)	1
Netherlands (Dutch Top 40 Tipparade)	15
Netherlands (Single Top 100)	84
Scottish Singles Sales (Official Charts)	1
Sweden (Sverigetopplistan)	40
Switzerland (Schweizer Hitparade)	57
UK Singles (Official Charts)	1

=== Year-end charts ===
Chart (2005)	Position
UK Singles (OCC)	37

== Certifications ==
Region	Certification	Certified units/sales
United Kingdom (BPI)	Platinum	600,000^{‡}
^{‡} Sales+streaming figures based on certification alone.

== Release history ==
Region	Date	Format(s)	Label(s)	Ref.
Denmark	22 August 2005	CD	Helter Skelter	
United Kingdom	22 August 2005	7-inch vinyl; CD; DVD	Big Brother	
Japan	24 August 2005	CD	Epic	
