= The Thaw Session =

Single by the Verve
- Released: 22 October 2007
- Genre: Alternative rock; jam session
- Length: 14:09
- Songwriters: Nick McCabe; Richard Ashcroft; Simon Jones; Peter Salisbury

The Verve singles chronology
"Sonnet" (1998)	"The Thaw Session" (2007)	"Love Is Noise" (2008)

"The Thaw Session" is a jam session by English alternative rock band the Verve. It was released exclusively as a free download by the band through the NME website on 22 October 2007. The fourteen-minute song was available for only one week from the website and intended as a preview to the material the band had been working on since reforming in the summer of 2007.

The title of the download is a reference to "Deep Freeze", a hidden track in "Come On", the final song on the band's 1997 studio album Urban Hymns.
