= Brit Awards 1998 =

British music awards ceremony

- Date: 9 February 1998
- Venue: London Arena
- Hosted by: Ben Elton
- Most awards: The Verve (3)
- Most nominations: The Verve (5)

Television/radio coverage
- Network: ITV

Brit Awards 1998 was the 18th edition of the Brit Awards, an annual pop music awards ceremony in the United Kingdom. It was organised by the British Phonographic Industry and took place on 9 February 1998 at the London Arena in London.

== Performances ==
Artist	Song	UK Singles Chart reaction (week ending 28 February 1998)	UK Albums Chart reaction (week ending 28 February 1998)
All Saints	"Never Ever"	7 (-5)	All Saints – 3 (+/-)
Chumbawamba	"Tubthumping"	N/A	Tubthumper – 79 (-20)
Finlay Quaye	"Sunday Shining"	N/A	"Maverick A Strike" – 7 (+2)
Fleetwood Mac	"The Chain"	N/A	The Dance – 33 (-2); Rumours – 65 (-13); Greatest Hits – 66 (-12); Tango in the Night – 68 (-10); Greatest Hits – 81 (-1)
Robbie Williams; Tom Jones	"The Full Monty Medley"	N/A	Life Thru a Lens – 4 (+/-)
Shola Ama	"You Might Need Somebody"	N/A	Much Love – 22 (+2)
Spice Girls	"Stop"	N/A	Spiceworld – 14 (+6)
Texas featuring The Method Man	"Say What You Want"	N/A	White on Blonde – 10 (-2)
The Verve	"Lucky Man"	73 (-8)	Urban Hymns – 2 (-1)

== Winners and nominees ==
British Album of the Year (presented by Zoë Ball)	British Producer of the Year
The Verve – Urban Hymns; Oasis – Be Here Now; The Prodigy – Fat of the Land; Radiohead – OK Computer; Texas – White on Blonde	Youth, The Verve and Chris Potter; Nigel Godrich and Radiohead; Liam Howlett; Roni Size; Stephen Street
British Single of the Year (presented by Pam Grier and Samuel L. Jackson)	British Video of the Year (presented by Steve Coogan as Alan Partridge)
All Saints – "Never Ever"; Blur – "Song 2"; Chumbawamba – "Tubthumping"; Eternal featuring BeBe Winans – "I Wanna Be the Only One"; Elton John – "Something About the Way You Look Tonight /Candle in the Wind 1997"; Olive – "You're Not Alone"; Radiohead – "Paranoid Android"; Texas – "Say What You Want"; The Verve – "Bitter Sweet Symphony"; Robbie Williams – "Old Before I Die"	All Saints – "Never Ever"; Blur – "Song 2"; David Bowie – "Little Wonder"; The Chemical Brothers – "Block Rockin' Beats"; Dario G – "Sunchyme"; Jamiroquai – "Alright"; Oasis – "D'You Know What I Mean?"; Republica – "Drop Dead Gorgeous"; Spice Girls – "Spice Up Your Life"; Supergrass – "Late in the Day"; The Verve – "Bitter Sweet Symphony"
British Male Solo Artist (presented by Errol Brown and Natalie Imbruglia)	British Female Solo Artist (presented by Richard Branson)
Finley Quaye; Gary Barlow; Elton John; Paul Weller; Robbie Williams	Shola Ama; Michelle Gayle; Louise; Beth Orton; Lisa Stansfield
British Group (presented by David Baddiel and Frank Skinner)	British Breakthrough Act (presented by Jo Whiley and Max Beesley)
The Verve; Oasis; The Prodigy; Radiohead; Texas	Stereophonics; All Saints; Shola Ama; Embrace; Olive; Beth Orton; Finley Quaye; Conner Reeves; Roni Size & Reprazent; Travis
British Dance Act	Soundtrack/Cast Recording (presented by Cleopatra)
The Prodigy; Brand New Heavies; The Chemical Brothers; Eternal; Jamiroquai	The Full Monty; Men in Black; Romeo + Juliet; Space Jam; Trainspotting
International Male Solo Artist (presented by Claudia Schiffer and Matthew Modine)	International Female Solo Artist (presented by Alexander McQueen and Honor Fraser)
Jon Bon Jovi; Coolio; LL Cool J; DJ Shadow; Sash!	Björk; Erykah Badu; Meredith Brooks; Celine Dion; Janet Jackson
International Group (presented by Heather Small and Jay Kay)	International Breakthrough Act
U2; Daft Punk; Eels; Hanson; No Doubt	Eels; Erykah Badu; Daft Punk; Hanson; No Doubt

=== Freddie Mercury Award ===
- Elton John

=== Most Selling Album Act ===
- Spice Girls

=== Outstanding Contribution to Music ===
- Fleetwood Mac

== Multiple nominations and awards ==
The following artists received multiple awards and/or nominations.

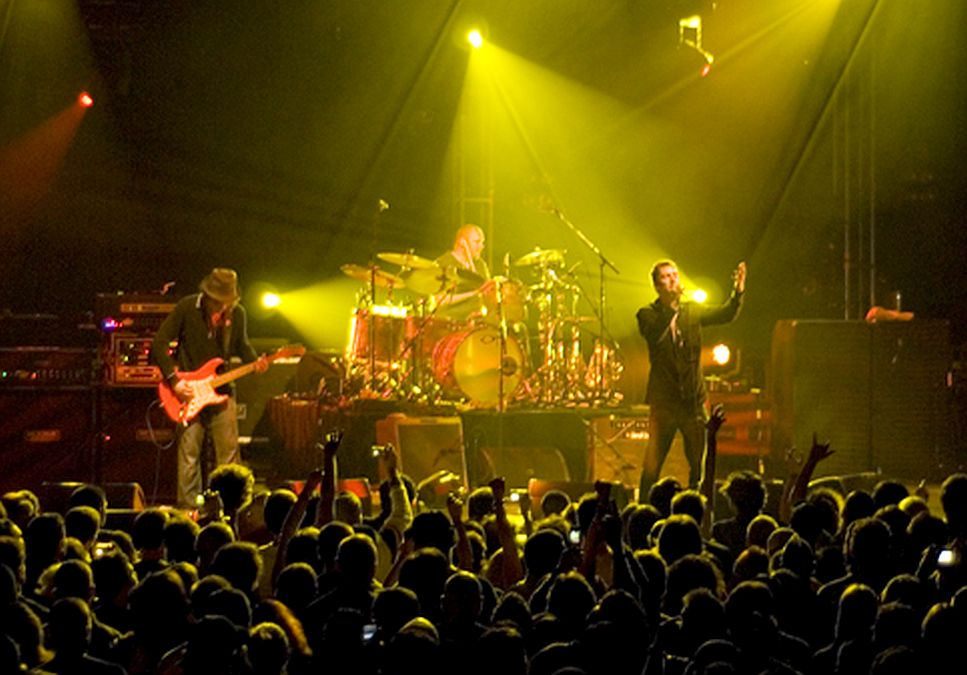
Three-time winner The Verve as most nominations and awards

Artists that received multiple nominations
Nominations	Artist
5	The Verve
4	Radiohead
3 (4)	All Saints
3 (4)	Oasis
3 (4)	The Prodigy
3 (4)	Texas
2 (16)	Beth Orton
2 (16)	Blur
2 (16)	The Chemical Brothers
2 (16)	Daft Punk
2 (16)	Eels
2 (16)	Elton John
2 (16)	Erykah Badu
2 (16)	Eternal
2 (16)	Finley Quaye
2 (16)	Hanson
2 (16)	Jamiroquai
2 (16)	No Doubt
2 (16)	Olive
2 (16)	Robbie Williams
2 (16)	Roni Size
2 (16)	Shola Ama

Artists that received multiple awards
Awards	Artist
3	The Verve
2	All Saints
