= Sonnet (The Verve song) =

1998 single by the Verve

Single by the Verve

from the album Urban Hymns
- B-side: "Stamped"; "So Sister"; "Echo Bass"
- Released: 2 March 1998
- Studio: Olympic (London, England)
- Genre: Britpop; soft rock
- Length: 4:22
- Label: Hut; Virgin
- Songwriter: Richard Ashcroft
- Producers: The Verve; Youth

The Verve singles chronology
"Lucky Man" (1997)	"Sonnet" (1998)	"The Thaw Session" (2007)

Music video
- "Sonnet" on YouTube

"Sonnet" is a song by the English rock band the Verve and is featured on their third album, Urban Hymns. It was released on 2 March 1998 as the final single from the album. The ballad has the same instrumental layout as "The Drugs Don't Work", consisting of acoustic and electric guitars backed up with a string section mainly consisting of violins.

In the United Kingdom, the single was disqualified from appearing on the UK Singles Chart, but an imported release peaked at number 74. Worldwide, the song charted in Australia, Iceland, Italy and New Zealand. Lead singer Richard Ashcroft re-recorded "Sonnet" for his 2021 album Acoustic Hymns Vol 1. This version was featured in the 2024 John Lewis & Partners Christmas advertisement.

== Background ==
At the start of 1998, the Verve's record label, Hut Records, wanted to release another single from Urban Hymns, an idea with which the band disagreed. Hut pressed them on this matter, so the band agreed to release "Sonnet", but only in a format that would make it ineligible for chart recognition. Consequently, "Sonnet" was released as part of a set of four 12-inch records (backed by "Stamped", "So Sister" and "Echo Bass").

The release of "Sonnet" was limited to just 5,000 copies, despite the huge radio coverage it received, and the United Kingdom's Official Charts Company refused to recognise it as a single because of the extra content, as planned. The pack was released in a cardboard mailer, and the preceding three singles from the album, all were re-released on the same day, fitted into the mailer. However, sales of an imported format resulted in it charting in the United Kingdom at number 74.

== Music video ==
The music video is set in a large car park. An "Exit" sign written in Russian can be seen in the background. The rest of the video consists of repeated close-ups of singer Richard Ashcroft sitting in a chair, with different backgrounds each time, and every member of the band at the end of the video. The music video was filmed in July 1997.

== Track listing ==
- European CD and 12-inch single

Australian and Japanese CD single

1. "Sonnet"
2. "Stamped"
3. "So Sister"
4. "Echo Bass"

== Charts ==
=== Weekly charts ===
Chart (1998–1999)	Peak position
Australia (ARIA)	83
Iceland (Íslenski Listinn Topp 40)	4
Italy Airplay (Music & Media)	10
New Zealand (Recorded Music NZ)	43
Scottish Singles Sales (Official Charts)	63
UK Singles (Official Charts)	74
UK Airplay (Music Week)	8

=== Year-end charts ===
Chart (1998)	Position
Iceland (Íslenski Listinn Topp 40)	17

== Certifications ==
Region	Certification	Certified units/sales
United Kingdom (BPI)	Platinum	600,000^{‡}
^{‡} Sales+streaming figures based on certification alone.

== Release history ==
Region	Date	Format(s)	Label(s)	Ref.
United Kingdom	2 March 1998	12-inch vinyl	Hut; Virgin	
Japan	8 July 1998	CD	Hut; Virgin	
