= Urban Hymns =

1997 studio album by the Verve

Studio album by the Verve
- Released: 29 September 1997
- Recorded: 1996–1997
- Studios: Olympic, London
- Genres: Britpop; indie rock; orchestral rock; psychedelia; post-Britpop
- Length: 75:57
- Label: Hut
- Producers: The Verve; Chris Potter; Martin "Youth" Glover

The Verve chronology
A Northern Soul (1995)	Urban Hymns (1997)	This Is Music: The Singles 92–98 (2004)

Singles from Urban Hymns
- 1. "Bitter Sweet Symphony" Released: 16 June 1997; 2. "The Drugs Don't Work" Released: 1 September 1997; 3. "Lucky Man" Released: 24 November 1997; 4. "Sonnet" Released: 2 March 1998; 5. "The Rolling People" Released: June 1998

Urban Hymns is the third studio album by English rock band the Verve, released on 29 September 1997 on Hut Records. The group had broken up while promoting A Northern Soul in August 1995, though they reformed two weeks later without guitarist Nick McCabe. Frontman Richard Ashcroft moved to Bath, Somerset, where he made demos; Simon Tong joined the group soon afterwards. Following aborted recording sessions with producers John Leckie and Owen Morris, the band sought a new guitarist, contacting former Suede guitarist Bernard Butler, who played with them for a week before departing amidst creative differences. In 1996, the Verve started recording at Olympic Studios in London, first with producer Martin "Youth" Glover, followed by engineer Chris Potter. Ashcroft contacted McCabe in early 1997, inviting him back into the band, which McCabe accepted. Several songs were re-recorded to allow for the inclusion of McCabe's guitar parts, with sessions continuing into May 1997.

"Bitter Sweet Symphony" was released as the lead single from Urban Hymns in June 1997; the track suffered from a debate over its writing credits due to its use of a sample of the Rolling Stones. "The Drugs Don't Work" followed as the second single from the album in September 1997, which was promoted with three supporting dates for Oasis in London. "Lucky Man" appeared as the third single from the album in November 1997. Nike, Inc. used "Bitter Sweet Symphony" in an advertisement for three months, which in turn helped promote Urban Hymns. "Sonnet" was released as the fourth single from the album in March 1998. The Verve played a hometown show at the Haigh Hall in Wigan to an audience of 40,000 in May 1998. The following month, "The Rolling People" was issued as the fifth and final single from the album as a US radio-only release. Citing stress, McCabe sat out of further touring commitments and was replaced by B. J. Cole. They went on a US tour in July and August 1998, leading up to a show at Slane Castle in Co. Meath, near Dublin, Ireland, before breaking up.

Urban Hymns received widespread praise from music critics, many of whom praised Ashcroft's role in making the album; several saw it in the context of Britpop; and others touched on the overall quality of the writing. Retrospective reviews focused on how the Verve mixed their new sound with their old sound and on McCabe's role in the album. It peaked at number one in Ireland, New Zealand, Sweden, and the UK and reached the top 10 in Australia, Austria, Finland, France, Italy, Norway, and Portugal. Initially selling 250,000 copies in its first week of release, Urban Hymns went on to become the fifth fastest-selling album in the UK and has been certified 11-times platinum in the UK by the British Phonographic Industry (BPI). The album's first three singles peaked within the top ten of the UK Singles Chart, with "The Drugs Don't Work" peaking the highest at number one. The BPI have subsequently certified the album's songs: "Bitter Sweet Symphony" at quadruple platinum; "The Drugs Don't Work" and "Lucky Man" at platinum; and "Sonnet" at gold.

At the 1998 Brit Awards, the Verve won Best Album for Urban Hymns and Best Producer alongside Youth and Potter. Melody Maker, NME, and The Village Voice included the album on their lists of the year's best releases; NME also included it on their list of the 500 best albums of all time, while author Colin Larkin featured it in his book All Time Top 1000 Albums (2000). It has appeared on best-of lists for the Britpop genre by Musikexpress, Pitchfork, and The Village Voice. Urban Hymns, alongside OK Computer (1997) by Radiohead, is seen as leading to the end of Britpop and influencing post-Britpop acts such as Travis. "Bitter Sweet Symphony" was Britpop's last anthem, while "The Drugs Don't Work" has become a cross-generational song.

== Background ==
The Verve released their second studio album, A Northern Soul, in July 1995 through Hut Records, peaking at number 13 in the UK Albums Chart. Its three singles – "This Is Music", "On Your Own", and "History" – all charted within the top 40 of the UK Singles Chart, with "History" reaching the highest at number 24. In the lead-up to the album, the culture of the 1990s had shifted with the emergence of new lad and Loaded magazine, as well as the continual evolution of football culture and Britpop becoming a mainstream movement. Initial promotion consisted of a one-off show in Newcastle, a supporting slot for Oasis in Scotland, a performance at Phoenix Festival, and a US tour. The strained relationships between the band members came to a head when they performed at T in the Park in August 1995; at its conclusion, frontman Richard Ashcroft announced his departure from the band. Bassist Simon Jones saw the situation as an argument rather than a breakup, though the event was reported in press outlets as the latter.

When the departure was made public, the press could not reach Ashcroft as he was on a camping trip in Cornwall. Unlike the other members of the Verve, Ashcroft was not concerned about his future career path. Being known as the main songwriter in the band, he was seen as a viable option by Hut. Ashcroft's reputation for offering soundbites to publications appealed to even people who had no interest in the Verve, giving the label an ideal starting point for a solo career. Following the breakup, Ashcroft spent time in hotels, at friends' residences, and at his mother's home. Co-manager Jane Savage said Ashcroft showed up at the offices of their PR company, Savage & Best, saying that he was going to work with different people and at one point planned to form a six-person band. Within two weeks of the split, Ashcroft started collaborating with Jones and drummer Peter Salisbury again. Author Trevor Baker, in his book Richard Ashcroft – The Verve, Burning Money & The Human Condition (2008), said this made the public think that the reported breakup was nothing more than a method to get guitarist Nick McCabe out of the band. (Note: In an 11 November 1995 issue of NME, it was reported that Ashcroft had started a new band, referred to as comparable to the Verve, albeit superior. The publication was told that it did not include McCabe but featured Jones and Salisbury. Ashcroft vehemently denied breaking up the Verve and reforming immediately afterwards to exclude McCabe. He admitted that they had personal issues with one another, "but we all individually had our problems and we'd been through the insane tours, the insane albums, blah blah blah." McCabe said in an October 1997 interview with Vox that he was being a difficult individual while being completely paranoid, and as a result, they fired him. "Well, no-one was asked to leave, but that's how it felt at the time. Me and Richard don't always get on, we're polar opposites." Insiders claimed that Ashcroft and McCabe had been barely speaking to each other during the recording sessions of A Northern Soul that McCabe debated assaulting Ashcroft.)

== Development and aborted sessions ==
Ashcroft and his wife Kate Radley relocated to Bath, Somerset, renting a flat not far from the residence of Radley's parents, where Ashcroft began to get creative. Jones, Salisbury, and Tong moved to London, where they waited for Ashcroft to say he was ready to start recording. In the meantime, Ashcroft made nine demos, which included versions of "Bitter Sweet Symphony", "The Drugs Don't Work", "Sonnet", and "Space and Time". Ashcroft asserted that they were not the Verve without McCabe, deciding that the studio time would be for his debut solo album or they would name themselves something else. They drafted Simon Tong, a friend they met at Winstanley College, who was expected to play a keyboard and to accompany Ashcroft's guitar parts. Tong had taught Ashcroft and Jones their first chords on guitar some years prior. Co-manager John Best said Ashcroft had accumulated enough songs, that by September 1995, recording was already underway. Sessions were held at Real World Studios in Bath, Somerset, with producer John Leckie, where they made 32 demo recordings, albeit in unfinished states. Leckie explained that nothing was completed because they were too familiar with one another. Ashcroft did not give Hut permission to release the songs, as he was unhappy with them.

Due to the absence of McCabe, who was previously the foundation of the band's sound, Ashcroft had to learn how music worked. One such idea saw him coming up with tempos with hand clapping or using a piano and going from there. He struck the instrument, from which he built rhythms. Throughout 1996, Ashcroft hung out with Oasis, becoming interested in how the members worked together. He solely supported Oasis at the Madison Square Garden in New York City; the reception from the crowd convinced him that he could not handle being a solo musician and that he needed a band backing him. MTV reported that the Verve were recording in February 1996. In May 1996, the band started working with producer Owen Morris, who produced A Northern Soul, at Rockfield Studios in Wales, though they were unable to remake the chemistry that fuelled the A Northern Soul sessions. It was expected to last a week, but they only made it to two days. As Best noted, they lacked a guitarist. When he later asked who they were going to get, the four of them responded, "'It's got to be an amazing guitarist!' And I'm like, 'Who are the best guitarists? It's [former Stone Roses member] John Squire, [former Suede member] Bernard Butler, these sort of people.'" Both of these had left their previous acts, giving the Verve the opportunity to ask either of them. Ashcroft and Best were later at a party with Squire in attendance, though Ashcroft did not wish to approach him. (Note: Best went up to Squire and asked if he wanted to join the Verve; Squire looked at Ashcroft and told Best that he declined the offer, commenting on Ashcroft's drug intake. According to author Sean Egan, in his book The Verve: Star Sail (1998), Squire initially agreed until he started working with the Seahorses instead. The Seahorses issued their only album, Do It Yourself, in mid-1997, which was met with a mixed response.)

Ashcroft then met with Butler, at Best's suggestion; Butler had previously collaborated with David McAlmont until that partnership dissolved. Best knew him through his prior work with Suede and asked Geoff Travis of Rough Trade Records about getting him for the quartet. Travis did not think Butler would be interested in the endeavour, but to Best's surprise, he agreed. Ashcroft was unsure about the situation, as he had only previously played with childhood friends and saw Butler, despite his reputation, as a stranger. After a week, Butler contacted Best about what was happening, prompting him to get a taxi for Ashcroft in order to meet Butler. The band and Butler jammed for a week, working on "The Drugs Don't Work" and "Sonnet", though Ashcroft brushed aside these sessions, saying that it was only two days in a practice room and that there was no chemistry between them and Butler. Despite him considering Butler a perfect guitarist, the arrangement was deemed a disappointment as Butler wished to contribute his songs in addition to working on Ashcroft's own. Best, putting the lack of a guitarist situation aside, set about finding another producer for them. He thought that Ashcroft's bohemian, devotional personality could work well with Martin "Youth" Glover from Killing Joke. Youth owned The Butterfly studio, which was located in Brixton, London; they met him at the location, chalking up a rapport with him. Ashcroft played the recently written "Lucky Man" for Youth, who was enthusiastic about it.

== Recording ==
=== Youth sessions and Big Life management ===
By mid-1996, the quartet were recording at Olympic Studios in London. Youth set a condition that they would all arrive at the studio by 10 a.m., and work through until the evening; by then, they would go home. Youth convinced Ashcroft to abandon the Stone Roses influences in their sound and aim for a traditional, classic rock direction. In addition to this, he wanted Ashcroft to continue working on a track known as "Stones Song", which was later renamed "Bitter Sweet Symphony". Ashcroft liked Youth's restrictions and was relieved that his hedonistic tendencies were reined in when they were working, though he eventually started showing up later to the studio. Throughout the sessions, the recording tapes were designated as "Richard Ashcroft", while Youth wrote "The Verve" on boards, and Ashcroft had to correct him. Ashcroft did not plan to reuse the Verve's name, though he knew that it would sell more if it was labelled as such. He saw it as an act of fraud to use the Verve moniker, similar to the Doors without Jim Morrison or the Clash without Mick Jones. Youth said that Ashcroft wished to preserve the memory of the band prior to their breakup. He was aware that McCabe had served as a foil for Ashcroft, acting akin to an alter ego. While there was not a name for the band, Ashcroft planned to title the album Urban Hymns. "Space and Time" was the first song they attempted to record; the initial run-through ended up too fast, while a subsequent iteration the next day produced a version too slow.

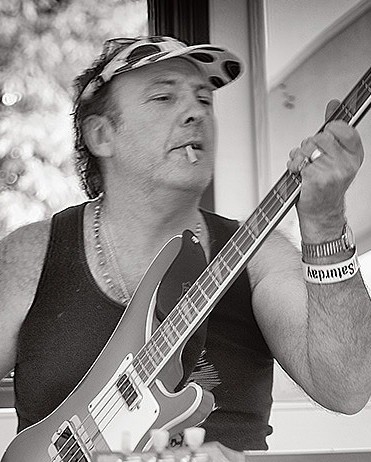
Martin "Youth" Glover (pictured in 2021) initially produced Urban Hymns before engineer Chris Potter took over the role.

During this time, Oasis performed at Knebworth, which was viewed as the zenith of Britpop. Ashcroft was frustrated with the Verve's success beyond the UK, debating if Best could give them a Knebworth-like moment. Best was occupied managing three separate companies and was unable to fulfil Ashcroft's desire to be his main priority as he was busy working with vocalists Brett Anderson from Suede and Jarvis Cocker from Pulp. Best had unintentionally put Ashcroft in contact with his future management team when the band were working with Youth. The latter was being managed by Big Life, which was operated by Jazz Summers. Upon hearing the new material, Summers told Ashcroft that he could make them the most popular act on the planet. Ashcroft appreciated Summers' enthusiasm for his songs, and he liked him on a personal level, referring to him as a maverick like himself. By this point, Summers was known for helping to break British acts in the US, such as Lisa Stansfield and Wham!. This became the catalyst for Ashcroft wanting to work with Big Life. Baker said that though Savage & Best had success with Britpop acts Pulp and Suede, Summers' company gave Ashcroft the opportunity to move beyond the indie credibility they had ascertained.

While the material was taking shape, Ashcroft was concerned that there was something missing. Youth's orders gave them focused recording sessions, which at times were creatively stifling, in contrast to the free-form jam sessions they used to have. Over several months, Ashcroft had been thinking of McCabe. Youth recounted that Ashcroft often mentioned how good of a musician McCabe was during the sessions. Simon Clarke of the Kick Horns, who had previously worked with the Verve on A Storm in Heaven, said that the sessions had a different atmosphere. Kick Horns went into the studio, recorded their parts, and left, feeling like they had less of a rapport with the Verve. Saxophonist Tim Sanders, also acknowledging the tonal shift, said it was an Ashcroft-led environment and was unsure if anything they made ended up on the finished album. He was aware they were repeating parts they employed on A Storm in Heaven, contemplating if they were needed as they were "just fattening things out."

In the run-up to Christmas 1996, strings were recorded for "Bitter Sweet Symphony". Ashcroft and string arranger Wil Malone came up with two separate arrangements for it, both centred around the chord progression of "The Last Time" by the Rolling Stones, which was chopped and screwed and looped. Ashcroft intended for the arrangement to be cinematic, a modern take on the work of Ennio Morricone. Complex vocal arrangements were recorded for the track, where Ashcroft sang in different styles for different takes, such as staccato in one and a gruffer vocal in another. Egan likened this approach to something listeners could hear on old Motown singles instead of a typical indie band. Youth first saw the song's potential as a single, despite Potter and other people doubting his vision, until they heard the final recording. Over time, Youth slowly withdrew from the proceedings, allowing Potter to take more control, until Youth left altogether after Christmas.

=== Potter sessions and McCabe's return ===
Virgin Records had spent £2 million on the recording sessions at this stage. Potter contributed more to the production direction with the band, who were aware of his lack of credentials as a studio worker. Ashcroft was satisfied with this, as he did not want a controlling person in charge. Ashcroft felt that what they were working on did not sound like the Verve, missing what Baker saw as the chemistry that prior sessions had with McCabe. It ultimately dawned on him that he needed McCabe for the album. After reaching this conclusion, there was initially trouble contacting McCabe in early January 1997. (Note: Between the Verve's split and the phone call, 18 months had lapsed. After the split, McCabe visited a doctor about his health before returning to the band's hometown of Wigan. Former Hut scout Miles Leonard, who discovered the band, stayed in contact with McCabe. Leonard said it was important as McCabe was suffering after losing something that was important to him. While the sessions for Urban Hymns were underway, McCabe had given up on becoming a musician ever again after joining and leaving another band after some months. He joined an electronics course in order to be an electrician while living with his parents and looking after his daughter Ellie. He shifted his focus to repairing his relationship with his ex, at which point he gave up the course and became a stay-at-home father. After several months, his ex ordered him to leave, forcing him to move into a bedsit. He then started working with his friend Ray Chan for the latter's band Witness. Throughout this, McCabe taped the occasional electronic demo for himself. His depression worsened, attributed to his lack of despondency. Around Christmas 1996, McCabe's flatmate almost had him sectioned.) Ashcroft called McCabe's flat in Wigan and then his mother, eventually finding him at a friend's place. Ashcroft reportedly said that he would quit music if McCabe did not rejoin them, while McCabe told Ashcroft that he wanted to tell him to go away but was pleased about the contact. McCabe's return was met with an air of hostility from people at Virgin Records, as they, in his words, had the notion that the Verve had a strong album and were worried that McCabe was going to change it into something akin to krautrock.

Tong stayed in the Verve, being able to provide guitar and keyboard parts. Up to this point, they had tracked 15 songs. McCabe's arrival did not mean they needed to scrap any of this material. He complimented the material, though mentioning that the proceedings had stalled. McCabe said that a few of the tracks were created by using loops, which had the side effect of forcing the music into segments of four bars that had minimal changes between them. He subsequently had Potter, who he thought was acting in the engineering role instead of as a producer, rent a Pro-Tools rig, which the pair used for improvisational purposes. Several of the tracks that were deemed finished were re-recorded in order for McCabe to add his guitar parts, such as "Bitter Sweet Symphony" and "The Drugs Don't Work". When he heard "Lucky Man", he decided to add a guitar part similar to the one heard in "The Calvary Cross" (1974) by Richard Thompson. McCabe listened to the material they did with Leckie, such as "Monte Carlo" and an early iteration of "A Song for the Lovers" (2000) with Tong on guitar, which he praised. While the songs benefitted from McCabe's playing, there was some discussion about his return in a personal way, with Salisbury initially being hesitant about the situation; Ashcroft found it easier to communicate when working together with McCabe.

With the shift in the producer role, the sessions became more fruitful. Youth said Ashcroft came across as claustrophobic when he was working with them, despite how productive his strict methods were. At this point, Ashcroft felt they needed more tracks to work with. Before any further work commenced, the band were perplexed to find that recordings from the initial sessions at Olympic had surfaced on the internet. Baker said that barely two years prior, it was very uncommon for people to be trading audio files online, and this had become prevalent by this point. They returned to recording in February 1997, tracking re-recorded versions of A Northern Soul outtakes "The Rolling People" and "Come On". Baker said these new renditions were a noticeable improvement to the extent that they influenced the Verve to try and reclaim the energy they had in 1994. As such, there was a return to the improvisational style that the band were more familiar with. A ten-day session in May 1997 at Olympic saw the creation of "Weeping Willow", "Catching the Butterfly", "Stamped", "Three Steps", and "The Longest Day". Baker said the band played together with no direction in mind as Ashcroft sang "whatever came into his head over the top and Nick tore strange sounds out of his guitar."

"Catching the Butterfly" evolved from the rest of the band listening to McCabe as he messed around with a guitar that was enhanced by an effects unit. They spent the next 30 minutes jamming around this, finishing the song. It initially lasted half an hour until it was edited down to over six minutes. The bulk of "Weeping Willow" was done while McCabe attended a wedding, and when he came back, Baker said he contributed a powerfully psychedelic, effects-enhanced guitar part to what the band had recorded. As the recording lasted for longer than was planned, the band were under pressure to finish it up. For the mixing sessions, Potter worked from partway through the morning one day until 4 a.m. the following morning. Hut was content with the material they listened to, though they were bemoaning how long the sessions were lasting and gave the band a deadline. As mixing was wrapping up, "Neon Wilderness" was recorded at the last minute when McCabe began playing with a loop. It was started and completed over the course of 11 hours, finishing at 7 a.m. on the last booked studio day. Nine months were spent recording and mixing the album, collectively.

== Composition ==
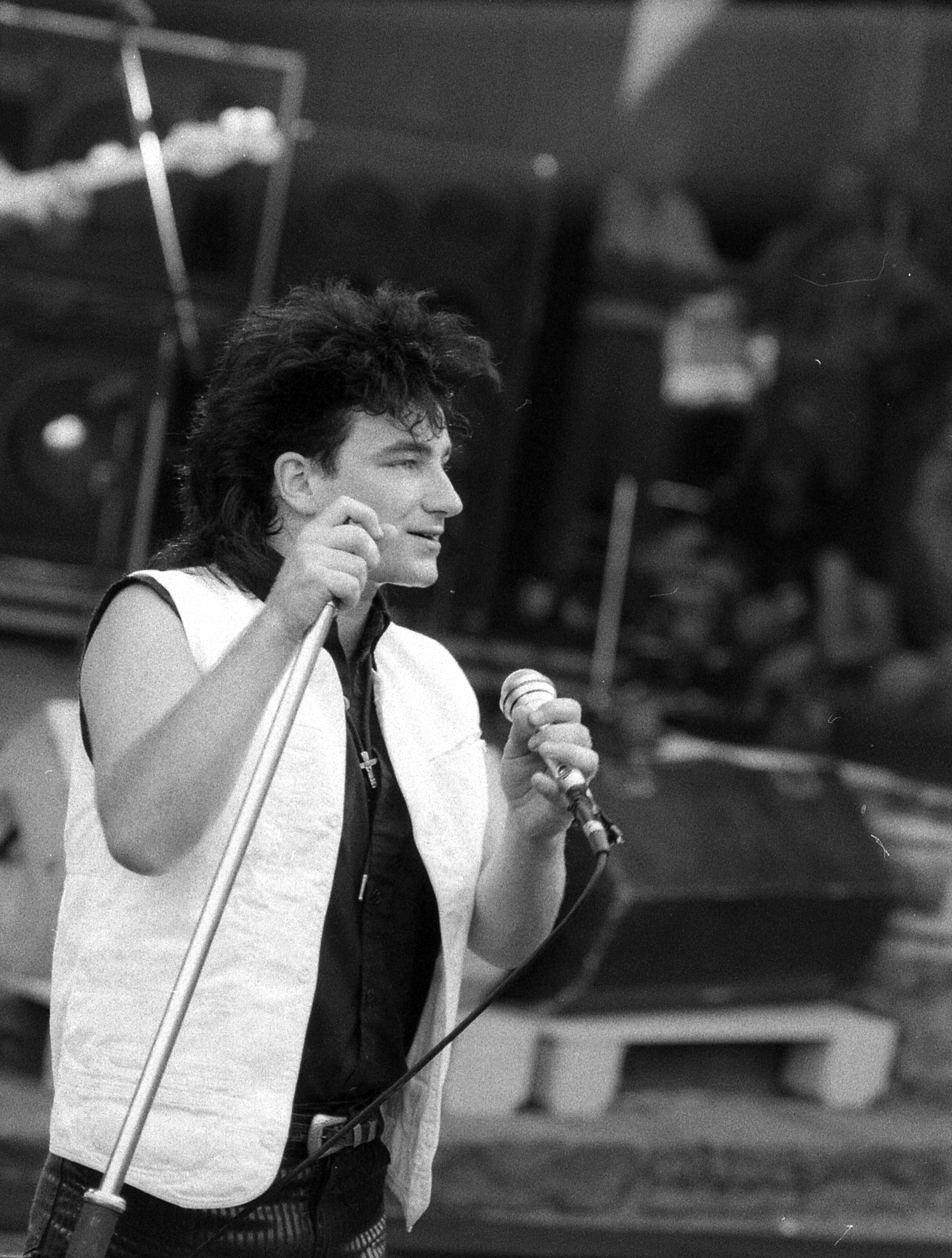
Ashcroft's vocals evoked U2 frontman Bono, circa October (1981).

=== Music ===
The music of Urban Hymns has been described as Britpop, indie rock, orchestral rock, psychedelic, and post-Britpop, in the vein of Big Star and Oasis. Author Velimir Ilic noted in his book The Verve: Mad Urban Soul (1997) that mid-tempo compositions that owed their debts to Roxy Music, alongside giving it references, points to the likes of Astral Weeks (1968) by Van Morrison, The Wall (1979) by Pink Floyd, and Exile on Main St. (1972) by the Rolling Stones. Max Pilley of Drowned in Sound commented that with McCabe and Potter working on the album, the work of Amon Düül II and Spacemen 3 acted as influences in its creation. Ashcroft's vocals have been compared to those of U2 frontman Bono during the October (1981) era. A Northern Soul's string-laden ballad "History" acted as a prototype for the material on Urban Hymns. On the latter album, the songs did not feature the typical publishing credit attributed to all of the band members. Indicative of the album's phases of recording, some of the tracks were credited solely to Ashcroft, the Verve collectively, or in one case, to McCabe and the Verve. McCabe said in 2017 that these credits were a form of revisionism as every member of the band contributed ideas to the songs, adding that their manager pushed to have Ashcroft as the writer. Baker said a difference was noticeable in the material Ashcroft wrote before, like "The Drugs Don't Work", and after marrying Radley, with "Sonnet" and "Lucky Man" touching on contentment in the music.

Author Martin Clarke wrote in his book The Verve: Crazed Highs + Horrible Lows (1998) that Urban Hymns' strength lies in the material Ashcroft wrote on his own without McCabe, such as "Bitter Sweet Symphony", "Sonnet", "The Drugs Don't Work", and "Lucky Man". Upon McCabe's reappearance, Clarke noted a shift towards the improvisation style of the Verve's older material. He saw a stark contrast with the common factor being Ashcroft, as he wrote: "To put it bluntly, The Verve's balladry is currently unparalleled, but their rockier songs are more ordinary." Baker wrote that the album was accessible to people who had little regard for popular music, while at the same time, it came across as their most mature work. He gave the string section in "Bitter Sweet Symphony" as an example, stating that if the prior releases from the band "had worn jeans and a t-shirt, this one was dressed up like James Bond." Author Philip Wilding, in his book The Verve: Bitter Sweet (1998), remarked that the album sounded as if it were from a different decade than it was released in, highlighting the elements of psychedelia, the loud–quiet dynamic, and Ashcroft's boisterous taunting. Baker saw it as the Verve trying to merge two separate sides of themselves, mentioning the classic pop writing of "The Drugs Don't Work" and the urge to create contemporary rock music. He added that the Verve were proud that they did not need to make songs that harkened to music from the past, in contrast to Britpop acts like Oasis. Clarke wrote that Ashcroft shone as a vocalist on the album, conveying his emotions on the acoustic songs while also being able to be aggressive when needed.

=== Lyrics and themes ===
Journalist Neil Strauss, writing for The New York Times, summarised Urban Hymns as tackling depression while smiling; appreciating the dark days in life as a positive day was probably to follow it. With the album's lyrics, Ashcroft became more open, as he reached a point where he no longer felt that he had to hide behind unnecessary imagery in his words. He intentionally altered his lyrical style for Urban Hymns. Egan said the lyrical transformation of leaving behind such allusions that had started with A Northern Soul was completed by Urban Hymns. Ashcroft commented that the most difficult thing for him to comprehend lately was that it was difficult to fully know a person and for a person to fully know him: "When you grow up you learn to belong by covering yourself up. We're not allowed to break through those doors and shout, 'This is me! Who are you, for fuck's sake!' You've got to open up yourself and that's why, lyrically, after five years, I've opened up in this new album."

Egan said one thematic element of the album stemmed from Ashcroft witnessing that they lacked "one 'self', that they are so complex as to make the notion of a single self ridiculous (hence 'I'm a million different people from one day to the next,' from 'Bitter Sweet Symphony'). It wasn't realisation which produced a comfortable feeling." Andrew Rumsey of Third Way wrote about a trend in popular music that revolved around the theme of despair, singling out The Bends (1995) by Radiohead and Urban Hymns as two releases that were partially hopeful despite this. Clarke noted the emphasis on love in the majority of the songs, which he attributed to Ashcroft's marriage to Radley. Wilding also pointed out the love theme, adding that it also discussed the human condition, understanding that life is an enigma. He said it was not simply about Ashcroft being direct; "It was going to be bigger than that."

== Songs ==
=== Tracks 1–7 ===
The opening track of Urban Hymns, "Bitter Sweet Symphony", is centred around an orchestral arrangement of "The Last Time" by the Rolling Stones. It was taken from The Rolling Stones Songbook (1966), which that band's manager Andrew Loog Oldham had created. (Note: The Rolling Stones Songbook was unique for its time, as similar releases did not appear until the 1970s. Egan said Oldham's version of "The Last Time" had minimal similarity to the guitar riff-driven Rolling Stones rendition, going as far as to say he was sceptical that the majority of people were conscious of the track's origin point without resorting to the label. Ashcroft was nonplussed about Oldham's version lacking resemblance to the Rolling Stones' version.) Upon hearing the reworking, Ashcroft wanted to reimagine it as a piece of pop-art. He focused on one orchestral lick that stood out to him. Ashcroft thought that he could change it into another song; he started to loop four bars that included its strings and bells instrumentation and made a new track from it. (Note: As early as the Verve's debut single, "All in the Mind" (1992), Ashcroft was fascinated by the idea of sampling. He said there were some elements in compositions that were unable to be ignored, particular song forms and noises that, to him, were timeless. In the context of hip-hop, samples were employed as the song's hook. For "Bitter Sweet Symphony", the song's string refrain – the most memorable section of it – was written by the Verve. McCabe said the sample itself played a minor role in the song and that people were mistaking Malone's score as the sample. Egan proposed that with the track's laborious and complex recording process, the band might have forgotten where Oldham's song had fit into its creation, saying that "Bitter Sweet Symphony" was significantly dissimilar to Oldham's recording than it was to the Rolling Stones' original.) Baker said Ashcroft repeated a process that he employed on the songs found on A Storm in Heaven, monologuing the entire vocal section over an existing piece of music. The song's lyrics were influenced by a work he read at school, Death of a Salesman (1949), by Arthur Miller and its main character, Willy Loman. Baker said the latter was a typically average man, trying to make a living and yearning for money before ultimately dying without any fortune. Despite this origin, Baker said "Bitter Sweet Symphony" appeared substantially more positive. The final album version merged Britpop with boom bap, backed by a trip hop beat, with vocals that were layered in order to make it appear like an angelic choir. Malone's looped strings served as an inverse of Ashcroft's sermon-esque lyrics. Baker said McCabe offered these peculiar "swirling guitar sounds", which appear shortly prior to Ashcroft's voice.

"Sonnet" had a stripped-back atmosphere compared to "Bitter Sweet Symphony" and was one of many tracks on the album that encapsulated Ashcroft's life in the preceding few years. Baker said it could be about the start or the demise of a relationship, backed by string parts and an acoustic guitar, the latter of which he felt was subdued compared to its appearance in the later track on the album, "Lucky Man". "Sonnet" employed one of Ashcroft's new songwriting techniques, which Egan described as "pulsing textures" in the form of handclaps under the vocal melody. Egan wrote that the lyrics showcase a man who is trying to romance a potential lover, despite being self-aware as to how he is unsuccessfully coming across to them. He compared the minor electric guitar parts to what a listener could hear on FM stations in the US. "The Rolling People" evokes the Verve's earlier work, opening with what Baker described as gale sounds, "as though it's being recorded in a desolate wilderness somewhere." Egan said it was about making sacrifices when trying to survive day-to-day, such as telling white lies while being polite. It takes elements of "The Four Horsemen" (1972) by Aphrodite's Child and "I Got a Thing, You Got a Thing, Everybody's Got a Thing" (1970) by Funkadelic, while evoking "Ramble On" (1969) by Led Zeppelin and "Gimme Shelter" (1969) by the Rolling Stones.

"The Drugs Don't Work" dates back to 1995, when Ashcroft revealed the song's existence in an interview with Select. In this, he explained that he took drugs despite them making him feel dreadful, as a way of coping with irritation and boredom. Ashcroft changed one of the pronouns from "me" to "you" in the released rendition of the track, which Baker noted led to speculation about the song's backstory, such as one analysis saying it was about his deceased father. Ashcroft himself viewed it as a love song about how drugs did not have the same effectiveness they previously had. Egan suggested that the song's protagonist attempts to escape his misery through other means until he realises that he can no longer suppress the pain he is experiencing. Egan said Ashcroft was conscious that a few of the lyrics appeared contradictory, though he did not substantially edit them so as to appear deceitful when he wrote them in a specific headspace, along with liking the ambiguity afforded to other musicians, such as Kurt Cobain of Nirvana and John Lennon of the Beatles. Baker attributed the rawness of Ashcroft's voice to it being the first take he recorded for the song.

The introduction to "Catching the Butterfly" was compared to the Beatles during their Eastern music period, with a guitar riff heard in the distance. Baker saw it as a strange blend of "bucolic psychedelia and something much more brutal and industrial." Matthew Horton of NME saw it as a mix of 1980s acts Cocteau Twins and Happy Mondays. The song discusses lucid dreaming; Egan said the lyrics shared a similar sentiment as "One Day" in that they place importance on the perspective of children. He explained that Ashcroft focused on rediscovering his younger self in his mind and leaning from them as he entered adulthood. Egan pointed out one aspect of Ashcroft's childhood that influenced the track: a family event where Ashcroft was chided for speaking out of turn. Clarke felt that the track's music and lacklustre lyrics made it more appropriate for A Storm in Heaven than Urban Hymns.

Baker considered "Neon Wilderness" to be a musical counterpart to the A Northern Soul track "Brainstorm Interlude", acting as a break in the album. It lacked any form of chorus section or hook, serving as an extended outro, with Ashcroft's voice being placed lower in the mix while McCabe can be heard contributing ambient guitar parts, recalling the work of Jeff Buckley. Horton wrote that the atonal change in the track shifts the mood from hazy to eerie, divulging "something ugly beneath the stoner bliss." Egan said the lyrics made it appear as a follow-up to "History", with it dwelling on the nighttime and a person being lonely. Wilding suggested that these themes were possibly the result of the song's creation in the early hours of the morning. "Space and Time" is the oldest song to appear on the album, having been performed by Ashcroft while in New York with Oasis, where Ashcroft demonstrates his vocal range. The track deals with an unsuccessful love affair. Baker thought that the band seemed unsure of themselves, as the track is unclear in its direction, acting as a ballad interspersed with abrupt moments of rock. "Space and Time" and "Weeping Willow" showcase the band aping the sound of U2, a direction that Ryan Leas of Stereogum commented was not previously possible because of the Verve's former tendency to use lots of guitars altered by effects units.

=== Tracks 8–13 ===
"Weeping Willow" is a personal song that includes allusions to drugs and guns. Egan said it had a refrain where the narrator needs to be saved, a frequent topic in Ashcroft's material from this time period. Ashcroft said the guitars in it came across as the work of Neil Young playing in Hell; Clarke suggested that the Verve's previous tours with Oasis had influenced them as he compared the track to the 1995 Oasis songs "Champagne Supernova" and "Wonderwall". "Lucky Man" is a simpler-sounding track that differs from the rest of the rock tracks heard on the album. Baker remarked that it appeared as a duet with the string parts and Ashcroft, going as far as to say it was a direct collaboration between Ashcroft and Malone, as much as it was a song by the rest of the Verve. McCabe's role on the track was instead played by Tong, whose style Baker dubbed "much cleaner and brighter." The lyrics discuss Ashcroft's involvement with Radley, with the level of affection increasing by the song's conclusion. Wilding said Ashcroft commented on the positive experiences to be had in life. Egan compared the influence of Radley on Ashcroft to that of Sara Dylan for "Sad Eyed Lady of the Lowlands" (1966) by Bob Dylan and Patti Boyd for both "Something" (1969) by the Beatles and "Layla" (1970) by Derek and the Dominos.

"One Day" is a ballad that has Ashcroft duetting with himself through the use of multi-tracking. The lyrics were influenced by a newspaper story that he saw where a man discusses journeying around the world in a tiny boat. During one section of his trek, the man consumed alcohol and was tied to the mast, thinking that he was going to die. Egan said the lyric that alludes to this in the song touches on the "fundamentals of existence [...] implying the passing of all things - good and bad - over time." He added that it also refers to Ashcroft talking about artists that involve themselves in drama "of the raging elements", while other lyrics of the song detail individuals being unable to find the happiness they experienced when they were children. Clarke thought it was derivative and too dissimilar to "Lucky Man"; Ashcroft explored the sound of "One Day" on his subsequent solo albums.

In "This Time", Ashcroft declares that in the future, he would be able to fly; it was initially titled "Discordant", which Baker attributed to the combination of piano and drum parts. The noise heard in the background came about from the band using coat hangers against the recording tape. Egan called this improvisation method akin to Brian Wilson of the Beach Boys, whom Ashcroft highly admired. The hypnotic atmosphere stemming from this earned it a comparison to the material on A Storm in Heaven. Clarke thought the track sounded like something from 1989, highlighting Ashcroft's spoken-word voice, guitars in the vein of Squire, and a shuffling drum pattern. The song depicts a man pondering the mistakes he has made throughout his life and agreeing with himself not to lament them but to better himself by learning from what he has done. Egan said he was surprised by how direct the lyrics were, featuring largely the evocative imagery previously associated with Ashcroft's songs. The sole line that is closest to this, "Gonna rise into the light", acts as a statement of self-improvement without needing to stick to a firm philosophy or religion.

The title of "Velvet Morning" was a tribute to Lee Hazlewood, who gave Nancy Sinatra the song "Some Velvet Morning" (1967). Egan said the character in Ashcroft's song had a different issue from Hazlewood's song, acknowledging that no single person had a useful method of fixing the problems in the world. Ashcroft wished to have a similar raw vocal effect that Hazlewood employed when he sang with Sinatra. Subsequently, his voice was treated with a loudhailer that he got from a car boot sale a week prior to recording, which was promptly stuck to his microphone. As they felt the song was missing something, Tong went upstairs in the studio to borrow a pedal steel guitar from Eric Clapton, who was recording at the time. The guitars eventually earned a comparison to Echo & the Bunnymen, while the song overall evoked Neil Diamond.

Clarke suggested that the closing track on Urban Hymns, "Come On", was named after the phrase Ashcroft frequently shouts while on a stage. Ashcroft referred to the song as a battle cry for those that need to hear it; part of the lyrics have him trying to contact God using a phonebox. Ashcroft can be heard saying "fuck you!" which ends the album. Egan reasoned that the phrase was not intended to be said negatively, instead serving as an extension of the song itself: "linked to the galvanising nature of the instrumentation, a 'fuck you' of joy shouted by a man riding on a sea of raging guitars." Liam Gallagher of Oasis does the backing vocals on the track, screaming the titular phrase. The song was compared to the material on A Northern Soul due to its aggression. Baker said it shared qualities with "The Rolling People", such as Ashcroft's ranting vocal style and guitars sounding like rottweilers. The backing track was done in a single day, which Baker said lent it a "ferocious energy" to conclude the album with; it recalled the works of Led Zeppelin, MC5, and the Stooges. Following "Come On" is the hidden track "Deep Freeze", which consists of noise from a radio, incomprehensible dialogue, jangly guitar parts, and a baby crying.

== Artwork and packaging ==
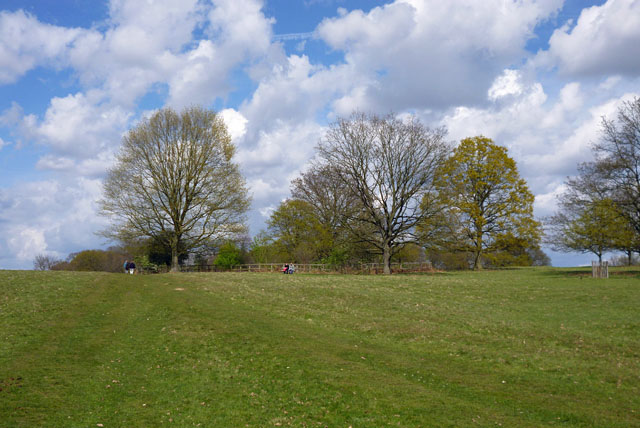
The artwork for Urban Hymns was photographed in Richmond Park, located in London.

To usher in this new period for the Verve, designer Brian Cannon set about to make a template for the band's releases. Egan said the previous way of making elaborate set pieces was ditched. For the album, Ashcroft told Cannon that he did not want anything too complex for the artwork, wanting the music to speak for itself. The cover photo was a group shot that Egan said was peculiar, as the members did not want to intentionally pose for it. To compromise, the band, Cannon, and photographer Michael Spencer Jones visited Richmond Park in London solely to see what a photography session might result in. Another photographer was present to also take some images, which made Jones feel awkward. The Verve was sitting on the grass as they were waiting for a lighting set-up to be finished when they witnessed a deer herd roaming around the park.

When Jones observed that the members of the Verve had relaxed, he decided to take an image, though none of the band were aware at the session. The subsequent photograph shows nearly all of the members, bar McCabe, facing left. Rumours, which were dismissed by Baker, Cannon, and Egan, were posted on the Internet where the word "love" was allegedly hidden in the front cover while looking at the sky, trees, and Ashcroft's hat. Cannon retrospectively told Baker that it was his least favourite cover design he helped create. In the album's inner sleeve, a black Labrador Retriever can be seen playing with the band, who are laughing at it; the dog, which was named Charlie, belonged to Ashcroft. Wilding saw this as a big contrast to how the band are seen in the artwork for A Storm in Heaven, which, to him, seemed like a dissimilar band of people.

== Release ==
=== "Bitter Sweet Symphony" single and sample dispute ===
The Verve's return was not formally announced until May 1997, the reveal of which was met with scepticism; critics had diverted their prospects to the likes of Radiohead and Stereophonics. During the time the Verve were absent, Britpop started to decline in popularity as electronica and its associated acts, such as the Chemical Brothers, the Prodigy, and Underworld, grew in prominence. Prior to "Bitter Sweet Symphony" being issued, the Oldham sample had to be cleared. The band were hopeful about it, having learnt that Rolling Stones members Mick Jagger and Keith Richards enjoyed the song. The copyright for the sample was owned by businessman Allen Klein and his company, ABKCO Records. (Note: Klein had previously managed the Beatles and the Rolling Stones. Despite not working with the latter for decades, Klein retained a financial interest in them, owning the copyright to all of the songs they recorded in the 1960s.) Before the single's planned release date, ABCKO declined clearance for it. Klein said he did not like sampling as a concept and would not allow it for a Rolling Stones song. Summers set about to persuade Klein, as he felt the track had the chance to make a lot of money for both parties. Annoyed by it, Summers contacted the US offices of Virgin Records, asking for assistance in the situation. Virgin's vice chairman Nancy Berry contacted Rolling Stones members Mick Jagger and Keith Richards, who wrote "The Last Time", and played "Bitter Sweet Symphony" for them. Though the pair liked the song, they did not want to be involved with the dispute as it meant crossing Klein. (Note: Summers had also contacted Oldham, who liked "Bitter Sweet Symphony", though understood why ABKCO was standing their ground over the sample. Oldham said that the members of the Rolling Stones likely do not remember where they themselves had stolen it from. Baker and Egan noted an influence from "This May Be the Last Time" (1954) by the Staple Singers on "The Last Time".)

Summers sought EMI president Ken Berry; EMI controlled Virgin, and by extension, albums by the Rolling Stones and the Verve. Berry, who liked the song, promptly went to Klein's office and played it for him. Upon hearing the track, Klein enjoyed the song and gave permission for the sample. His terms of agreement were for 50% of all royalties, the standard percentage for samples, which the Verve agreed to. ABKCO contacted them again shortly before the song's release, demanding 100%, though this bid was too late to have an effect. (Note: When the Verve heard about the clearance, Ashcroft said he celebrated by doing "Fucking air-boxing, karate, you name it, we went through the lot." He had sleepless nights about the incident, including of other musicians having been wronged, such as Beach Boys manager Murry Wilson selling his son Brian's song catalogue without him knowing. McCabe said a later issue arose when Virgin Records had not secured a mechanical license for the song. A musicologist was brought in and determined that Ashcroft had sung the vocal melody from the Rolling Stones' recording, which was in half-time compared to the Oldham version. McCabe claimed the track was credited to Jagger–Richards because of this and not the sample.) "Bitter Sweet Symphony" was eventually released as a single on 16 June 1997, while a version remixed by James Lavelle was released on 28 July 1997. Egan said the song listed "farcically complicated credits", denoting a performance by the Andrew Oldham Orchestra, production credit to Oldham, with vocals from Ashcroft. The writing credits were changed to Jagger–Richards and lyrics from Ashcroft, with publishing going to ABCKO. The song became an unanticipated success, with a significant portion of the money going towards Klein's company.

As the song was longer than three-and-a-half minutes, the typical length of a pop song, several American radio stations did not play the song. Ashcroft was told that he should edit the track's length, being warned that if they did not, radio stations would and it would not be registered as a "play" in their systems. Baker said the music video propelled the song's success, becoming one of the most-watched and parodied videos of the 1990s. The video, which was shot on Hoxton Street in North London over several days due to inclement weather as the recording sessions for the album were concluding, has Ashcroft walking down a pavement as he mimes the song's lyrics. Ashcroft came into contact with other pedestrians along the way, appearing oblivious as he bumped into them or knocked them to the floor. It was directed by Walter Stern, who previously directed the videos for "Breathe" (1996) and "Firestarter" (1996), both by the Prodigy. The video served as a tribute to the video for "Unfinished Sympathy" (1991) by Massive Attack; their vocalist Shara Nelson is seen in a street in Los Angeles, California, also disregarding people that were close by. Baker remarked that while Nelson appeared to be lost in her thoughts, Ashcroft had "more belligerence and aggression", accurately depicting his "single-mindedness, not to mention his ability to brush aside people who got in his way or who couldn't keep up." Ashcroft loathed that his stare was becoming a defining aspect of his personality and explained that he was seriously angry while filming the video. Following the success of "Bitter Sweet Symphony", people that had not heard of the band were now recognising Ashcroft when he went out. (Note: During the mid-1990s, celebrity culture rose to an unprecedent level in the UK. Subsequently, there was an excessive interest in everything Ashcroft did, not solely the music. Upon being spotted on the street by people, they recalled the video; some van drivers went by him and told time, "Ere, mate! The video's finished!" Designers were offering him absurd cash sums simply to sit in at a fashion show. On an occasion where he and Radley went on holiday to Rome, Italy, they were being followed by people with cameras. Upon returning home, his and Radley's faces were printed on the cover of the UK's newspapers.)

=== "The Drugs Don't Work" and "Lucky Man" singles and album release ===
"The Drugs Don't Work" was released as a single on 1 September 1997. The music video for the song was directed by Andy Baybutt and George Hanson and filmed at the flat of Hut Records boss Dave Boyd in London. The band wanted the music video to appear on ITV's The Chart Show without the standard captions that were superimposed on other videos it showed. The Chart Show alleged that one of its employees revealed that Ashcroft's illness, which resulted in a cancelled UK tour, was fake as he saw Ashcroft at a Spiritualized show at that time. They said the band were being petty in retaliation with the captions. Summers did not like the show's stance on the matter and withheld a tape copy of the video from them. As a result, the show aired a portion of the "Bitter Sweet Symphony" video and gave more airtime to a Portishead video.

Ashcroft assumed part of the album's success came from radio stations, including BBC Radio 1, who had previously ignored A Northern Soul and, in particular, its track "History". He saw it as stations, coupled with British press outlets, feeling guilty for not backing A Northern Soul. "Bitter Sweet Symphony" was released to modern rock radio stations in the US in September 1997 and pushed to mainstream radio the following month. Support for the US airplay came from music publicist Scott Piering; MTV writer Chris Nelson said the track was a leftfield choice as radio stations were enamoured with the ska revival and summer-themed songs from the likes of Smash Mouth and Sugar Ray, in addition to post-grunge. Urban Hymns was released in the UK on 29 September 1997 and issued in the US the following day.

"Lucky Man" released as a single on 24 November 1997. The song's music video was directed again by Baybutt and Henson. Another video, subtitled the US version, was directed by Jamie Thraves. In the video, the band are seen in an apartment, which is looking out to the water below. Ashcroft is holding a guitar and singing the song while pacing around the room as the other members can be seen looking unfazed by him. Baker suggested that this could have stemmed from the members not wishing to be in the spotlight like Ashcroft. It was released to modern rock radio stations in the US in April 1998. They did not wish to put out any further singles after "Lucky Man", wanting to instead focus on performing live. Near the end of 1997, Ashcroft stepped down from doing interviews, saying he was annoyed with having to defend and explain himself all the time.

=== Nike advert and later promotion ===
Though the Verve had been sent substantial offers, none of their music had featured in advertising placements. Numerous advertising agencies wanted to use "Bitter Sweet Symphony", but they were denied. While the band had power over the recording, they did not over the publishing. If they wished, ABKCO could have musicians make a different recording since the Verve did not want to use their own. Summers cautioned the band that it could end up to advertise the likes of General Motors and Nike, Inc. Nike initially contacted ABKCO about using Oldham's version of "The Last Time" by the Rolling Stones. The advert's targeted audience of younger people would not be familiar with the Oldham rendition, and despite this, they picked it as they thought the Verve would not let them use "Bitter Sweet Symphony". When Nike finished making a deal with Klein, they explained to Summers that he should let them use "Bitter Sweet Symphony" as everyone would assume it came from the Verve anyway if they went with the Oldham recording.

Summers discussed the matter with the band, who reluctantly let Nike use the song for three months with the view that it could stop others from using it, acknowledging that Nike had a positive past of making creative advertising plans. Baker suggested that, in the US, the commercial gave the song considerably more reach than airplay could have. The Verve earned $700,000 from the deal, which was split between Red Cross Landmines and the homeless shelter charity Youth 2000. Ashcroft watched two videos of the commercial that he was sent and did not like them. Despite this, when the advertisement started airing, there was an uptick in sales of the album in the US. Egan said the Nike commercial was essentially a free advertisement for the album, with it playing multiple times a day across the country. The band's issued a statement, explaining that had they not lost the publishing to Klein, the commercial would not have happened in the first place.

Following this, they said they were not giving any further interviews to press outlets, with the exception of cover stories. Clarke noted that with how popular the Verve were at this stage, instead of forcing publications to give them front page stories, the magazine editors picked other acts instead, such as Spin with Travis, ignoring the Verve altogether. Journalists could only enquire about the Verve's live performances, as other topics were off-limits. As a result, the band alienated a significant portion of the media in the US. Hut Records asked the Verve to issue another single in early 1998. Despite their reluctance, "Sonnet" was released as a single on 2 March 1998, albeit in a format that made it ineligible for charting: a collection of four 12-inch vinyl records with the song and its B-sides, "Stamped", "So Sister", and "Echo Bass", spread across each disc. Limited to 5,000 copies, it was packaged into a cardboard mailer; the previous three singles were reissued on the same day, with the intention of them fitting into the mailer. The music video for "Sonnet" was filmed by Chris Palmer. Shortly afterwards, the band earned the cover of Rolling Stone; the cover story discussed the band's presence in the US.

After long-form documentary videos by Black Grape and Radiohead, the Verve announced they would be doing the same thing with the tentatively titled This Is The Verve: Do Not Panic. Filmed by Hanson and Baybutt, it contained footage of their UK and US tours throughout 1997, live performances, and interviews. "The Rolling People" was released to modern rock radio stations in the US in June 1998, followed by "Sonnet" in July 1998. On 27 April 1999, the band's management released a statement detailing their decision to break up; Ashcroft said the band could have kept working had their situation been different. Though Ashcroft did not explain the circumstances, commenters suggested a rift between Ashcroft and McCabe. McCabe said no conversation was held about the break-up, which he learnt through a relative, who in turn said they heard the announcement on the radio.

"Bitter Sweet Symphony", "Sonnet", "The Drugs Don't Work", and "Lucky Man" were included on the band's second compilation album, This Is Music: The Singles 92–98 (2004), while music videos for all of them were featured on the video album of the same name. Urban Hymns was re-pressed on vinyl in 2008, 2016, 2018, and 2022. In 2017, an expanded version of the album was issued, including B-sides, outtakes, BBC Radio 1 session material, and live recordings from several shows. A CD of unreleased material for it was vetoed by Ashcroft; McCabe was frustrated by this, saying Ashcroft was the last person to contribute to the box set, adding: "It runs counter to his narrative. I think he's so wrapped up in this notion of Urban Hymns being his solo album and the existence of that CD probably rankles with him." Ashcroft did not involve himself in the reissues of their prior two albums; McCabe said Ashcroft only got involved with the one for Urban Hymns as he saw it as his debut solo album. Despite this, only Simon Jones and McCabe handled the press interviews for the reissue. In the same month of the box set's release, several unreleased tracks, demos, and different mixes that were omitted from it were leaked on YouTube. The person behind the uploads had received the songs from a friend that handled distribution at UMC.

== Touring ==
=== Initial treks and Haigh Hall ===
In the lead-up to the Verve's first live show in nearly two years, Ashcroft was in pain while they rehearsed. The gig at The Leadmill in Sheffield on 14 June 1997 was cancelled a few days before it took place. It was discovered that because of the stress of the recording sessions, Ashcroft had swollen lymph glands in his neck, which caused issues when he tried to sing, eventually leading to him collapsing. He told the NME that he was not interested in the show to start with, while the rest of the band were. When he went to a doctor, he was recommended to cease working for six weeks, resulting in the cancellation of other shows in June 1997 and forcing new shows to be booked for later in the year. The band finally returned to live performances on 9 August 1997 at The Leadmill. After some more shows, they performed at the Reading Festival, where they headlined the Melody Maker stage.

Following a month's break, they supported Oasis for three shows at Earls Court in London, between 25 and 27 September 1997, to a collective crowd of 60,000. Egan said that after the success of both "Bitter Sweet Symphony" and "The Drugs Don't Work", it turned the perception of these support dates into special events. He saw it as a form of Battle of the Bands between two popular British rock bands vying to win over support from critics and the general public. (Note: Clarke said that as critics reacted indifferently towards Oasis' Be Here Now (1997) album, the Verve now had the opportunity to take the crown from the Gallagher brothers. Neil McCormick of The Nation commented that within the volatile space of pop music, several critics had considered Oasis to be past their prime and were seeing the Verve as important figureheads in British music. Creation Records founder Alan McGee, who signed Oasis, said as their management team Ignition was occupied with "alienating the press, Verve got hold of the football and ran with it and became the biggest band of the moment with Urban Hymns.") Ashcroft felt that, given the Verve's recent increase in popularity, they were able to hold their own against Oasis.

After another month's break, the Verve embarked on a US tour; around this time, "Bitter Sweet Symphony" became a hit in the country, with its success owed to MTV for keeping the video in constant rotation. The trek consisted of 12 dates, ending in late November 1997. They played at a WHFS-sponsored Christmas festival and were due to appear at the KROQ Almost Acoustic Christmas festival, but had to pull out because of a death in Ashcroft's family. US dates in a few months' time were postponed as Ashcroft wanted to recuperate. Tickets for European shows, which went on sale by the end of the year, had sold out within two hours. To avoid the excess of previous treks, Ashcroft went on a detoxing holiday in Spain for two weeks. At the start of 1998, the band went on a UK tour of mid-sized venues, despite being able to fill arenas at this stage. In lieu of appearing at the Brit Awards, they instead played at a homelessness benefit that same night. As a result of the Nike advert, a tour of theatre venues was moved to bigger locations.

A one-off show was held at Haigh Hall in Haigh, Wigan, Greater Manchester, on 24 May 1998 to a crowd of nearly 40,000. They were supported by John Martyn and Beck, both of whom did not impress the audience. McCabe did not wish to continue touring; at Summers' suggestion, he saw a doctor, who told him that he was suffering from glandular fever. It was recommended that he take a two-month break, and when he told the rest of the band, the members individually talked him into continuing with the touring. During a performance in France, Ashcroft threw a bottle at McCabe, who reacted angrily. Later in the evening, he threw objects around a room in frustration. Summers called McCabe repeatedly in an attempt to get a rise out of him, in order for him to say "'I quit', but I never did." The Verve planned to appear at the Tibetan Freedom Concert festival in the US in June 1998 but had to cancel when Jones became ill while on tour in Germany. This subsequently saw the cancellation of three further shows in the country, one festival appearance in Sweden, and another in Italy.

=== Second US tour and Slane Castle ===
The US shows that were planned earlier in 1998 were shifted to July and August of that year, swapping the initial 3,000 capacity venues for 10,000 capacity venues. To make up for any disappointment, the Verve donated $10,000 to charities. Before the trek was underway, some shows were downsized to smaller venues. Pollstar editor Gary Bongiovanni said that the band's decision to play larger venues in the country was seemingly ambitious, noting that they were more popular in the UK and suggesting that they had a British mindset when securing US dates. On 7 July 1998, McCabe said he would not be touring for the remainder of the year, citing stress as a factor. At first, he was fine with playing on festival dates but did not look forward to another stint in the US. He was aware that the majority of the crowd would be less familiar with the pre-Urban Hymns material. The following day, Massive Attack, who were planned to be the support act on their US next tour, pulled out, wanting to embark on their own trek in the country later in the year.

Radley suggested B. J. Cole, who was known as an expert pedal steel guitarist, to fill in McCabe's position. Baker said Cole was a founding member of Cochise, where he took typical country forms and "given them a psychedelic, hippyish flavour", which Ashcroft was aiming for, while a typical guitarist that could perform "'licks' or riffs in the conventional sense, [that] just wouldn't work." Cole said Ashcroft invited him to a rehearsal, where he was fascinated by the Verve. Alongside Cole, percussionist Steve Sidelynk accompanied the band, having previously worked with the Rolling Stones and Madonna. The rest of the Verve were hesitant to tour again; Baker said they were conscious of the fact that "Bitter Sweet Symphony" and "The Drugs Don't Work" were "slowly permeating into the public consciousness, they had a great chance to break America." A Spanish festival performance was cancelled to give the band more time to rehearse.

The day before the US tour started, another date was cancelled and the Michigan show was downsized, marking the fifth venue to have done so since the tour's initial announcement earlier in the year. Upon arriving in the country, a week was spent in Chicago, Illinois, where they tried to mesh Cole's playing style into the band's material. The trek was intended to start 29 July 1998 and end in mid-August. Ashcroft said the shows did not meet the band's expectations, and he was concerned about the band's future. On 3 August 1998, the band performed "The Drugs Don't Work" on Late Show with David Letterman; the band had been requested by the show to half the song's runtime, which meant playing it from partway through. They rejected this demand, resulting in the show's credits starting as they were partway into the track. After returning to the UK, they performed at Slane Castle in Meath, Ireland, on 29 August 1998. Cole said it was a highlight of his career, and while the rest of the band felt fatigued, he did not. Ashcroft was aware that the show would be the band's last, even if no one else did. He was highly stressed during this time and nearly had a nervous breakdown on the US trek prior to the Irish show.

== Reception ==
Original release
Review scores
Source	Rating
Chicago Tribune	2.5/5 stars
Entertainment Weekly	B+
The Guardian	5/5 stars
Los Angeles Times	3/4 stars
NME	8/10
Pitchfork	8.9/10
Pittsburgh Post-Gazette	3/5 stars
Q	5/5 stars
Rolling Stone	3.5/5 stars
Select	5/5

Urban Hymns received widespread critical praise upon its release. Many critics latched on to Ashcroft's role, in particular his voice. Tom Lanham of Entertainment Weekly wrote that Ashcroft conveys his voice "like churchworthy gospel. Or at least a tidy sermon for jaded MTVers." Los Angeles Times writer Sara Scribner found Ashcroft to be oddly "detached yet brimming over with pathos all at once." McCormick mentioned that Ashcroft had a knack for detailing his "despair without self-pity, and the Verve beautifully shrouds his musings in shimmering guitars." Serge Truffant of Le Devoir highlighted "Sonnet" as a prime example of how Ashcroft's lyrics can stand apart even without the use of an orchestra. The staff at Select said Ashcroft triumphally managed to subvert the loathsome topics of music and love, "and gets away with a track called 'Neon Wilderness'. Some feat." Mojo writer John McCready did not like the band beforehand but was won over by Urban Hymns, largely in part to Ashcroft's earnestness as a lyricist, supplying listeners with their demand for music to "express some universal humanity". The staff at Music Week shared a similar sentiment, adding that his participation helped make for an "overwhelming and intense listening experience." Melody Maker's Martin James said Ashcroft's vocals evolved past basic "melody and flies with the greats. The ethereal passion and almost spiritual loneliness in his voice underlining the enormous sense of emotional breakdown that runs throughout these songs." Brent Dicrescenzo of Pitchfork echoed this, saying he "even looks and sounds like a ghost." Pete Chakerian of Cleveland Scene, like with Wener, said the album's strength came from Ashcroft reuniting with McCabe; Wener added that aside from Ashcroft's frontman position, "this sounds like the work of a focused unit, not one or two people."

Several reviewers touched on the album against the context of Oasis and the Britpop scene as a whole. Boca Raton News writer Ben Wener wrote that the Verve understood the urge to take inspiration from the past instead of outright copying an artist's work, unlike Oasis. He said the Verve, with Urban Hymns, managed to become a bastion of British rock music, despite taking attributes from Oasis, "But where the Gallagher boys are busy sloganeering and recapitulating dead ideologies, The Verve's Richard Ashcroft pens thoughtful mini-epics that are as pointed and intuitive about human nature as they are flowery and sweeping." DJ Bee of The Nation felt that from his first listen of Urban Hymns, it deserved considerably more appraisal than Oasis were receiving, going as far as to inform readers to "imagine what Oasis would sound like if they were as good as they proclaimed. The Verve's Hymn is certainly worth lighting a candle to." Journalist Neil McCormick said Urban Hymns was "deliciously downbeat" in contrast to the upbeat nature of Oasis' Be Here Now, though he struggled to pretend that its stark soul-searching could beat the populist sales of Oasis. NME's Ted Kessler remarked that the album pushes the Verve next to Oasis in "history's grand ledger. It insists, however, that they'll be the ones writing the next chapter." The staff at Gavin Report wrote that if a listener trusted the British music outlets, they would be led to believe the Verve had a spot next to Oasis and Blur as a flagship act for Britpop, "And if, like me, you let your own ears do the judging, you'll still hear song after song of something truly special going down." Tracey Bleile, writing for Consumable Online, said the Verve carved their own spin on Britpop with the second portion of the album, as it leaves the listener "stunned with their ability to do so much with so little." Pittsburgh Post-Gazette writer Ed Masley, meanwhile, said the Verve were the main motivation in ushering a new music scene to displace Britpop, alongside Radiohead, via evoking the sound of U2.

Other commentators talked about the overall quality of the writing. James summarised his peers when he felt that the Verve had finally become consistent with their aesthetic. He said that there was an unspoken mandate about having to find the superior tracks after suffering through the more difficult ones, adding that Urban Hymns was a release of exceptional "beauty so intent on grabbing at the strands of music's multi-hued history; so bloody-minded in its need to make its mark that it turns that tapestry into epic film in full-blown technicolour and sensurround sound with a scratch'n'sniff blotting paper thrown in for good measure." McCready said that with the album, the band became the best act in Britain, which he thought would have been an absurd declaration a mere four years prior, adding that its core ability to obtain "heights in a way which not only sets the standard for the rest of the year, but the decade, too." The Carillon writer Tricia Kuss saw the confident lyricism and "terrific arrangements [as producing] a terrific gem from the first to the last track proving that you can achieve machine gun rhythms while still having a positive outlook." Strauss noted that the Verve were not as highly regarded in the US as they were in the UK; the album "shows that music fans in neither country are wrong. On one hand, the album is not a perfect or even an important one. But its best songs are instant classics capable of holding up at least until the band breaks up again." The Sydney Morning Herald's Bernard Zuel saw Urban Hymns as a "more organic, more simpleminded (in a non-pejorative sense)" counterpart to OK Computer (1997) by Radiohead and noted that they used the "we-have-strings-and-we-know-how-to-use-them approach" set by Oasis, giving the material a "strangely vibrant melancholy." However, when they were not in that mindset, he said they were dissimilar to any other number of groups from the UK: "When they're good, they're very, very good, but when they're not, they're arid." Klaus Winninger of Der Spiegel found that the "quality and appeal of the remaining eleven songs" did not live up to the first two singles, "Bitter Sweet Symphony" and "The Drugs Don't Work", adding that "Lucky Man", for example, seemed out of place on the album. Robert Christgau of The Village Voice cited "The Drugs Don't Work" as a "choice cut", which denotes a solid track on an otherwise unworthy album.

== Retrospective reviews ==
Retrospective reviews
Review scores
Source	Rating
AllMusic	5/5 stars
Encyclopedia of Popular Music	5/5 stars
The Line of Best Fit	9/10
The New Rolling Stone Album Guide	4/5 stars
Pitchfork	8.6/10
Q	5/5 stars
Record Collector	3/5 stars
Rolling Stone Germany	4/5 stars
Sputnikmusic	3.5/5
Under the Radar	9/10

Retrospective reviews focused on the Verve melding their older sound with their new sound. AllMusic reviewer Stephen Thomas Erlewine noted that the band had softened their psychedelic edge without leaving it beyond, making themselves "sound more muscular than before," highlighting "Catching the Butterfly" and Come On" as examples. He added that the tracks like those put the ballads here into context, "which give Urban Hymns its hurt." musicOMH contributor Graeme Marsh complimented the album for meshing McCabe's psychedelic, electric guitar work with acoustic instrumentation. He mentioned that psychedelic music was the album's foundation, with "The Drugs Don't Work" and "Sonnet" seemingly misplaced. Baker said Urban Hymns was widely misunderstood, explaining that a significant portion of it was "every bit out-there" as the material on their first two albums. He commented that it takes a bitter mindset to disregard the quality of the singles. Baker wrote that their decision to make classic-sounding tracks and contemporary rock music was an issue that was not "entirely solve[d] on Urban Hymns." To him, on many of the tracks, these two sides are placed next to each other rather than being fused together, though the band proved themselves that they were able to make wonderful music in either side. Clarke said Urban Hymns was easily superior to their earlier albums, saying that where A Northern Soul was distinctly pretentious and exaggerated, Urban Hymns "aimed high and, in the case, made it." Record Collector's Jamie Atkins felt that the non-single songs offered the album "an edge that the arena-filling anthems (Lucky Man, Sonnet) may have made you forget."

Some critics discussed McCabe's role, while others mentioned Ashcroft's writing directly. While McCabe was the driving force for their first two albums, Pitchfork contributor Stuart Berman said the band expertly widened their sonic palette with Urban Hymns. He explained that "Neon Wilderness" would have been made much longer if it had originated from their early period and instead ended up as an interlude on the album, and jams such as "The Rolling People" were rare exceptions. Berman remarked that in lieu of McCabe's guitar parts, string sections and ambient music rounded out pieces such as "Sonnet" and "Lucky Man". Paul Moody of Classic Rock wrote that the album could still throw a punch, mostly because of McCabe's parts on the songs, highlighting his playing as enhancing "Catching the Butterfly", "Lucky Man", and "Neon Wilderness". McCabe's role was most prominent on "The Rolling People", "Neon Wilderness", and "Come On", which The Line of Best Fit writer Joe Goggins dubbed epics in the vein of A Storm in Heaven. The staff at The Observer praised the Verve's decision to mix their out-there material with Ashcroft's open lyrics, as it "showed up most of their alleged peers as the Britpop chancers they were." Erlewine said that despite the material earmarked for an Ashcroft solo act, the album "unmistakably sounds like the work of a full band, with its sweeping, grandiose soundscapes and sense of purpose." Pilley said that regardless of the writing credit to Ashcroft, it was evident that the songs were the work of more than just him, saying that if he was to receive praise, it should be for burying the hatchet with McCabe. Pilley commented that the lyrics Ashcroft came with up were confessional in a frequently embarrassing sense, yet were a perfect compliment to the album's production.

A few critics and music fans have felt that the album is somewhat overrated. (Note: Attributed to multiple references:) FasterLouder ranked Urban Hymns at number 32 in its all-time overrated albums list, where writer Jody Macgregor claimed people bought it on the basis of "Bitter Sweet Symphony" and realised the rest of the material was not as strong as that song. Likewise, Emily Tartanella of Magnet wrote that the release was "one of the most bloated, boring and overpraised albums of the '90s."

Pilley said the boisterous tracks, such as "Catching the Butterfly" and "Space and Time" set the album's tone, tracks which "set the controls for the heart of the sun and watch them melt before their eyes." He added that this was not the album's only positive, highlighting "The Drugs Don't Work" and "One Day" as examples that the band members were able to craft anything satisfying if they could work together.

Erlewine said that some people might not like its run time, but despite this, it was a lush release that harkens back to rock traditions while remaining contemporary sounding. "At a running time of 75 minutes, the album was an epic, anthemic wonder, with the record-buying public agreeing in droves, sales eventually topping 10 million worldwide." Clarke noted its length, at over 70 minutes, saying that the quality tapered off towards its conclusion, but highly praised the first half for being a "genuine masterpiece of emotional ferocity and delicate melody."

== Commercial performance ==
=== Album performance ===
Fuelled by the success of "Bitter Sweet Symphony", Urban Hymns shifted 250,000 copies in its first week of release. It topped the UK Albums Chart, becoming the fifth fastest-selling album in the UK behind Be Here Now, The Fat of the Land (1997) by the Prodigy, Bad (1987) by Michael Jackson, and Rattle and Hum (1988) by U2. It remained for 12 weeks at the top, with a total of 162 weeks on the chart. It knocked Be Here Now off the top position and was in turn knocked off by Marchin' Already (1997) by Ocean Colour Scene for a single week before returning and staying at number one for five further weeks. Urban Hymns was then knocked off by the soundtrack to Titanic (1997). It ended up as the second best-selling album of the year, being 200,000 copies behind Be Here Now. The album was certified platinum by the British Phonographic Industry (BPI) two days after its release. As of 2016, it has been certified 11-times platinum. In 2009, it was the 15th best-selling album in UK chart history, which was moved down to 18th by 2019. In 2013, Music Week reported that Urban Hymns was the only album issued by Virgin Records to have sold at least three million copies in the UK. As of September 2017, it has sold 3,315,950 copies in the UK, and as of September 2019, 10 million copies worldwide.

It initially peaked at number 63 on the Billboard 200 in the US, selling 21,000 copies, giving the band their first commercial success in the country. Figures stood at 470,000 by January 1998; after the Nike advert, the album moved up to number 36, and sales doubled, crossing over one million copies. It ultimately peaked at number 23. Though the Verve did not have as much success in the US compared to British contemporaries the Prodigy and Oasis, it remained within the top 75 of the Billboard 200 because of their prior tours in the US. The Recording Industry Association of America (RIAA) certified it platinum in 1998. As of January 2009, sales in the US stood at 1,358,000 copies.

In other countries, Urban Hymns achieved similar chart positions: number 1 in Ireland, New Zealand, and Sweden; number 2 in Italy; number 4 in Finland, Norway, and Portugal; number 9 in Australia, Austria, and France; number 11 in the Flanders region of Belgium and Germany; number 12 in Denmark; number 13 in Switzerland; number 15 in Canada; number 16 in the Netherlands; and number 23 in the Wallonia region of Belgium.

The album appeared on various year-end charts for 1997: number 2 in the UK behind Be Here Now; number 28 in Sweden; number 31 in New Zealand; number 70 in Australia; number 86 in the Flanders region of Belgium; number 97 in Germany; and number 99 in the Wallonia region of Belgium. The album appeared on various year-end charts for 1998: number 8 in New Zealand; number 31 in Canada; number 32 in Australia; number 36 in France; number 44 in the Flanders region of Belgium; number 48 in the Netherlands; number 49 in Denmark; and number 51 in Germany. In the follow years, the album appeared on the year-end chart only in the UK: number 129 in 1999; number 172 in 2001; number 138 in 2002; and number 186 in 2006. It was ranked number eight on the decade-end chart in the UK for the 1990s.

In other countries, Urban Hymns received similar certifications: gold in Argentina, Italy, and Japan; platinum in Belgium, France, Germany, the Netherlands, New Zealand, Spain, Sweden, and Switzerland; double platinum in Canada; triple platinum in Australia; and ten times platinum in Ireland.

=== Singles performance ===
"Bitter Sweet Symphony" peaked at number two on the UK Singles Chart, held off the top position by "I'll Be Missing You" (1997) by Puffy Daddy. It won Single of the Year at the NME Awards. The band were reluctant to appear at the ceremony as they thought they were being overexposed through the media. It was first certified platinum by the BPI in 2013 and has been certified quadruple platinum as of 2024; the RIAA certified the track gold in 2005. It also charted at number 6 in Finland, number 10 in Sweden, number 11 in Australia, number 12 on the US Billboard Hot 100, number 15 in New Zealand and Switzerland, number 16 in France, number 21 in the Flanders region of Belgium, and number 37 in Germany.

"The Drugs Don't Work" topped the UK Singles Chart and was knocked off the position the following week by "Candle in the Wind 1997" by Elton John due to the death of Princess Diana. It was certified gold by the BPI in 2013 and platinum in 2016. It also charted at number 9 in Finland, number 10 in New Zealand, number 18 in Sweden, number 22 in Australia, number 52 in the Flanders region of Belgium, number 72 in France, and number 87 in Germany.

"Lucky Man" peaked at number seven in the UK and was certified gold by the BPI in 2016 and platinum in 2019. It also charted at number 16 in Finland, number 38 in New Zealand, number 60 in Australia, number 67 in the Flanders region of Belgium, number 88 in France, and number 89 in Germany.

"Sonnet" peaked at number 74 in the UK and was certified silver by the BPI in 2019, followed by gold in 2024. It also charted at number 38 in New Zealand and number 83 in Australia.

== Accolades and legacy ==
Urban Hymns was nominated for the 1998 Mercury Prize, ultimately losing to Bring It On by Gomez. It did win Best Album at the Rock Bear Awards in Sweden. Morning Star ranked it at number six on their list of the year's best releases. Melody Maker named Urban Hymns as the number one album of 1997 in its year-end list, and the album ranked at number three on NME's year-end critics' poll. Q also included it in their own list of the best albums of 1997, while The Village Voice ranked it at number 18 on their year-end Pazz & Jop critics' poll. At the 1998 Brit Awards, the Verve had nominations for Best Album, Best Producer, Best Single, and Best Video. They won Best Album, beating OK Computer, and Best Producer alongside Youth and Potter. "Bitter Sweet Symphony" lost the Best Rock Song award at the 1999 Grammy Awards to "Uninvited" (1998) by Alanis Morissette. The song's video lost Video of the Year to Madonna, Best Group Video to Backstreet Boys, and Best Alternative Video to Green Day at the 1998 MTV Video Music Awards.

In the years following its release, Urban Hymns has received much acclaim. In 2000, it was voted number 213 in Colin Larkin's All Time Top 1000 Albums. Q included it in their 1999 list of the 90 best albums of the 1990s, while the magazine's readers voted it the 18th best album of all time in 1998. It later moved up to 16th place in a similar list compiled in 2006. The Verve were awarded with the first ever Q Classic Album award for Urban Hymns at the 2007 Q Awards, and the following year, Urban Hymns was ranked as the 10th best British album of all time in a poll jointly conducted by Q and HMV. It was also nominated for Best British Album of the Last 30 Years at the 2010 Brit Awards, losing to Oasis' (What's the Story) Morning Glory? (1995). Retrospectively, Consequence of Sound included the album at number 39 on their list of the top 50 albums of 1997, while No Ripchord ranked it at 93 on their top 100 albums of the 1990s list. The Village Voice ranked the album at number eight on their list of the 10 best Britpop albums, followed by Musikexpress and Pitchfork, both of whom put it in the top 10 of their best Britpop album lists. NME ranked it at number 128 in its list of the 500 Greatest Albums of All Time. The album was also included in the 2006 edition of the 2005 book 1001 Albums You Must Hear Before You Die.

Urban Hymns became the Verve's breakthrough album. Journalist Mark Beaumont wrote that as it nearly surpassed Oasis, the album changed culture in a way that acted as a countermeasure to the late-stage moments of Britpop, while in turn influencing minor acts who attempted big-sounding indie ballads, such as Travis. Stephen Hill of Louder said Urban Hymns, alongside OK Computer, as leading to the end of Britpop, explaining that it had "phenomenal dexterity, depth, honesty and complexity that Stella-swigging, bucket hat wearing, chirpy Brit-Pop couldn't stand a chance next to it." Goggins said the profound songs, namely "Space and Time", "One Day", and "Velvet Morning", showcased Urban Hymns as an indicator that the Britpop movement was ending. He explained that the Verve combined the anthemic qualities of Oasis and the ambitious musical nature of Blur with a heavy amount of empathy and character. Berman said the album was now seen as "swan song" for the cultural relevance of Britpop, despite it proposing a progression for the genre when it was released. "Bitter Sweet Symphony" was viewed by Leas and David Saavedra of El País as Britpop's last anthem. Leas grouped Urban Hymns alongside Be Here Now and This Is Hardcore (1998) by Pulp as Britpop's "comedown". Baker said "The Drugs Don't Work" was a cross-generational song, considerably more than "Bitter Sweet Symphony", that spoke to children, teenagers, people in their 20s, and people who were much older. He went on to say that it became a staple of buskers in the manner that "Wonderwall" did, which was an indicator of any song's impact. Egan attributed this to the introspective lyricism and uplifting melody, akin to the pain and darkest aspects found in country music. In 2019, Jagger and Richards relinquished their rights to "Bitter Sweet Symphony", meaning all subsequent royalties for the track went to Ashcroft.

== Track listing ==
All songs written by Richard Ashcroft, except where noted.

Urban Hymns track listing
No.	Title	Writer(s)	Producer	Length
1.	"Bitter Sweet Symphony"		The Verve; Youth	5:58
2.	"Sonnet"		The Verve; Youth	4:21
3.	"The Rolling People"	The Verve	The Verve; Youth	7:01
4.	"The Drugs Don't Work"		The Verve; Youth	5:05
5.	"Catching the Butterfly"	The Verve	The Verve; Chris Potter	6:26
6.	"Neon Wilderness"	Nick McCabe; The Verve	The Verve; Chris Potter	2:37
7.	"Space and Time"		The Verve; Chris Potter	5:36
8.	"Weeping Willow"		The Verve; Chris Potter	4:49
9.	"Lucky Man"		The Verve; Youth	4:53
10.	"One Day"		The Verve; Youth	5:03
11.	"This Time"		The Verve; Youth	3:50
12.	"Velvet Morning"		The Verve; Youth	4:57
13.	"Come On" (includes hidden track "Deep Freeze" (Note: The Japanese version of Urban Hymns has "Deep Freeze" as a separate track following "Come On", without the silence in between. In the 2017 digital and physical remastered versions, both tracks are joined with the silence.))	The Verve	The Verve; Chris Potter	15:15
Total length:				75:57

== Personnel ==
Personnel per booklet, except where noted.

The Verve

- Simon Jones – bass guitar
- Peter Salisbury – drums
- Richard Ashcroft – lead vocals, acoustic guitar
- Nick McCabe – lead guitar
- Simon Tong – guitar, keyboards

Additional musicians

- Mel Wesson – programming
- Paul Taylor – programming
- Wil Malone – strings arranger, strings conductor
- Liam Gallagher – backing vocals (track 13)

Production and design

- Chris Potter – recording, additional production (tracks 1, 2, 4, and 9–12), mixing (tracks 1, 2, 4, and 9–12), producer (tracks 3, 5–8, and 13)
- Gareth Ashton – assistant engineer
- Lorraine Francis – assistant engineer
- Jan Kybert – assistant engineer
- Martin "Youth" Glover – producer (tracks 1, 2, 4, and 9–12)
- The Verve – producer

Design

- Brian Cannon – design, director
- Martin Catherall – assistant
- Matthew Sankey – assistant
- Michael Spencer Jones – cover photography, interior photography
- John Horsley – additional interior photography
- Chris Floyd – additional photography

== Charts ==
=== Weekly charts ===
1997–1998 chart performance for Urban Hymns
Chart (1997–1998)	Peak position
Australian Albums (ARIA)	9
Austrian Albums (Ö3 Austria)	9
Belgian Albums (Ultratop Flanders)	11
Belgian Albums (Ultratop Wallonia)	23
Canada Top Albums/CDs (RPM)	15
Canadian Albums (Billboard)	18
Danish Albums (Hitlisten)	12
Dutch Albums (Album Top 100)	16
European Albums (Music & Media)	2
Finnish Albums (Suomen virallinen lista)	4
French Albums (SNEP)	9
German Albums (Offizielle Top 100)	11
Irish Albums (IRMA)	1
Italian Albums (FIMI)	2
New Zealand Albums (RMNZ)	1
Norwegian Albums (VG-lista)	4
Portuguese Albums (AFP)	4
Swedish Albums (Sverigetopplistan)	1
Swiss Albums (Schweizer Hitparade)	13
UK Albums (Official Charts)	1
US Billboard 200	23

2021 chart performance for Urban Hymns
Chart (2021)	Peak position
Greek Albums (IFPI Greece)	46

2025 chart performance for Urban Hymns
Chart (2025)	Peak position
Portuguese Albums (AFP)	157

=== Year-end charts ===
1997 year-end chart performance for Urban Hymns
Chart (1997)	Position
Australian Albums (ARIA)	70
Belgian Albums (Ultratop Flanders)	86
Belgian Albums (Ultratop Wallonia)	99
Canadian Albums (Nielsen Soundscan)	90
European Albums (Music & Media)	12
German Albums (Offizielle Top 100)	97
New Zealand Albums (RMNZ)	31
Swedish Albums & Compilations (Sverigetopplistan)	28
UK Albums (OCC)	2

1998 year-end chart performance for Urban Hymns
Chart (1998)	Position
Australian Albums (ARIA)	32
Belgian Albums (Ultratop Flanders)	44
Canadian Albums (RPM)	31
Danish Albums (Hitlisten)	49
Dutch Albums (Album Top 100)	48
European Albums (Music & Media)	6
French Albums (SNEP)	36
German Albums (Offizielle Top 100)	51
New Zealand Albums (RMNZ)	8
UK Albums (OCC)	6

1999 year-end chart performance for Urban Hymns
Chart (1999)	Position
UK Albums (OCC)	129

2001 year-end chart performance for Urban Hymns
Chart (2001)	Position
UK Albums (OCC)	172

2002 year-end chart performance for Urban Hymns
Chart (2002)	Position
UK Albums (OCC)	138

2006 year-end chart performance for Urban Hymns
Chart (2006)	Position
UK Albums (OCC)	186

=== Decade-end charts ===
1990–1999 decade-end chart performance for Urban Hymns
Chart (1990–1999)	Position
UK Albums (OCC)	8

== Certifications and sales ==
Certifications for Urban Hymns
Region	Certification	Certified units/sales
Argentina (CAPIF)	Gold	30,000^{^}
Australia (ARIA)	3× Platinum	210,000^{^}
Belgium (BRMA)	Platinum	50,000^{*}
Canada (Music Canada)	2× Platinum	200,000^{^}
France (SNEP)	Platinum	300,000^{*}
Germany (BVMI)	Platinum	500,000^{^}
Ireland (IRMA)	10× Platinum	150,000^{^}
Italy sales 1997-1998	—	250,000
Italy (FIMI) sales since 2009	Platinum	50,000^{‡}
Japan (RIAJ)	Gold	100,000^{^}
Netherlands (NVPI)	Platinum	100,000^{^}
New Zealand (RMNZ)	Platinum	15,000^{^}
Spain (Promusicae)	Platinum	100,000^{^}
Sweden (GLF)	Platinum	80,000^{^}
Switzerland (IFPI Switzerland)	Platinum	50,000^{^}
United Kingdom (BPI)	11× Platinum	3,315,950
United States (RIAA)	Platinum	1,358,000
Summaries
Europe (IFPI)	4× Platinum	4,000,000^{*}
^{*} Sales figures based on certification alone.^{^} Shipments figures based on certification alone.^{‡} Sales+streaming figures based on certification alone.

== See also ==
- Post-Britpop – a genre that rose to prominence in 1997
- Alone with Everybody – Ashcroft's 2000 solo debut album, his first release after the Verve's break-up
- The Good Will Out – the 1998 album by Embrace that earned comparisons to the Verve, also produced by Youth
