= Lucky Man (The Verve song) =

1997 single by The Verve

Single by the Verve

from the album Urban Hymns
- B-side: "Never Wanna See You Cry"; "MSG"; "The Longest Day"
- Released: 24 November 1997
- Studio: Olympic (London, England)
- Genre: Britpop; soft rock
- Length: 4:53
- Label: Hut
- Songwriter: Richard Ashcroft
- Producers: Youth; The Verve

The Verve singles chronology
"The Drugs Don't Work" (1997)	"Lucky Man" (1997)	"Sonnet" (1998)

"Lucky Man" is a song by English rock band the Verve. It was written by singer Richard Ashcroft. The song was released as the third single from the band's third studio album, Urban Hymns. It was released on 24 November 1997, charting at number seven on the UK Singles Chart. The song was the band's second top-20 hit on the Billboard Modern Rock Tracks chart in the United States, climbing to number 16. In Canada, "Lucky Man" peaked at number 25 on the RPM 100 Hit Tracks chart. It also reached the top 40 in Finland, Iceland, Ireland, and New Zealand.

== Background ==
In an interview on BBC Radio 2, singer Richard Ashcroft said the song was "inspired by my relationship with my wife, and that sense of when you're beyond the sort of peacock dance that you have early on in a relationship. And you're getting down to the raw nature of yourselves."

== Release ==
"Lucky Man" was released in the United Kingdom on 24 November 1997 across four formats: two CD singles, a 7-inch vinyl single, and a cassette single. An earlier single from the band, "History", is included as a B-side on CD1 of the UK release. The final B-side on CD2, "Happiness More or Less", is a remix of the title track made by guitarist Nick McCabe after another B-side was needed for the release. All of the guitar and most of the vocal parts were taken out, leaving the drums, bass and strings. Another B-side on CD2, "MSG", is an alternate version of "Bitter Sweet Symphony" that features the percussion and bass line from that song, with psychedelic soundscapes added. On 2 March 1998, the same day that follow-up single "Sonnet" was released, a 12-inch vinyl single of "Lucky Man" was also issued. In the United States, the song was serviced to alternative radio on 7 April 1998.

== Reception ==
U2's Bono listed the song as one of six songs released between 1986 and 2006 that he wished he'd written. A review in Cherwell stated that while the track was "not as instantly classically catchy" as Bitter Sweet Symphony, "it's likely to grow on you".

== Music videos ==
The UK version of the video was directed by Andy Baybutt and sees the band in the Thames Reach development, adjacent to the Thames Wharf complex, directly opposite the Harrods Furniture Depository. This is situated near Hammersmith, west London in post code W6 9HA, in the building at 11, Thames Reach. Richard Ashcroft sings the song whilst playing an acoustic guitar; the rest of the band look on. At the end of the video, the band is on the roof of the building. The final sequence is flipped horizontally, showing Ashcroft using binoculars to watch the other bank with the rest of the band.

The Thames Wharf Complex was designed by Sir Richard Rogers. The US version was shot in New York City, featuring the band in an apartment and then travelling to a mountain top.

== Track listings ==
UK CD1 and cassette single

1. "Lucky Man"
2. "Never Wanna See You Cry"
3. "History"

UK CD2 and Australian CD single

1. "Lucky Man"
2. "MSG"
3. "The Longest Day"
4. "Lucky Man (Happiness More or Less)"

UK 12-inch single

A1. "Lucky Man"
A2. "Never Wanna See You Cry"
B1. "MSG"
B2. "Longest Day"

Australian and New Zealand VHS single

1. "Lucky Man"
2. "Bitter Sweet Symphony"
3. "Lucky Man" (UK version)

== Charts ==
=== Weekly charts ===
Chart (1997–1998)	Peak position
Australia (ARIA)	60
Belgium (Ultratip Bubbling Under Flanders)	17
Canada Top Singles (RPM)	25
Canada Rock/Alternative (RPM)	7
Europe (Eurochart Hot 100)	40
Finland (Suomen virallinen lista)	16
France (SNEP)	88
Germany (GfK)	89
Iceland (Íslenski Listinn Topp 40)	7
Ireland (IRMA)	16
Italy Airplay (Music & Media)	2
New Zealand (Recorded Music NZ)	38
Scottish Singles Sales (Official Charts)	6
UK Singles (Official Charts)	7
US Modern Rock Tracks (Billboard)	16
US Triple-A (Billboard)	14

=== Year-end charts ===
Chart (1997)	Position
UK Singles (OCC)	107

Chart (1998)	Position
Canada Top Singles (RPM)	99
US Modern Rock Tracks (Billboard)	80

== Certifications ==
Region	Certification	Certified units/sales
United Kingdom (BPI)	2× Platinum	1,200,000^{‡}
^{‡} Sales+streaming figures based on certification alone.

== Release history ==
Region	Date	Format(s)	Label(s)	Ref(s).
United Kingdom	24 November 1997	7-inch vinyl; CD; cassette	Hut	
United Kingdom	2 March 1998	12-inch vinyl	Hut	
United States	7 April 1998	Alternative radio	Hut; Virgin	
