= The Drugs Don't Work =

1997 single by the Verve

Single by the Verve

from the album Urban Hymns
- B-side: "Three Steps"; "The Drugs Don't Work" (original demo); "The Crab"; "Stamped"
- Released: 1 September 1997
- Studio: Olympic (London, United Kingdom)
- Genre: Britpop; soft rock
- Length: 5:05
- Label: Hut
- Songwriter: Richard Ashcroft
- Producers: The Verve; Youth; Chris Potter

The Verve singles chronology
"Bitter Sweet Symphony" (1997)	"The Drugs Don't Work" (1997)	"Lucky Man" (1997)

Music video
- "The Drugs Don't Work" on YouTube

"The Drugs Don't Work" is a song by British rock band the Verve. The song was written by Richard Ashcroft and is featured on their third studio album, Urban Hymns. It was released on 1 September 1997 as the second single from the album, entering at the top of the UK Singles Chart. The beginning of the video shows the band walking down the street, following on from the end of "Bitter Sweet Symphony".

Ranked number seven on Channel 4's list of the "100 Greatest #1 Singles", the sombre nature of the song unintentionally captured the spirit of the United Kingdom as it was released the day after Diana, Princess of Wales died. In October 2011, NME placed "The Drugs Don't Work" at number 78 on its list "150 Best Tracks of the Past 15 Years".

== Background and recording ==
Lead singer Richard Ashcroft wrote the song in early 1995. He briefly mentioned it in an interview at the time, relating it to his drug usage: "There's a new track I've just written ... It goes 'the drugs don't work, they just make me worse, and I know I'll see your face again'. That's how I'm feeling at the moment. They make me worse, man. But I still take 'em. Out of boredom and frustration you turn to something else to escape." Over the years people have speculated that the song is about someone close to Ashcroft who was dying; however Ashcroft has been reluctant to give further details as he feels that people have their own views, and if he underlined his own interpretation that would be "killing it for people".

Ashcroft performed the song when the band was touring in support of A Northern Soul. The song was eventually recorded for Urban Hymns. The album's producer, Chris Potter, later referred to it as both the best song and best vocal he had ever recorded.

== Critical reception ==
It was NME's single of the week, with James Oldham writing that it "is an addictive and emotive record, a work of genius".

Alan Jones from Music Week wrote, "Beautifully orchestrated, semi-acoustic and distinctly old-fashioned, it's a melancholy ballad executed with great panache and enormous style by a group who can only get bigger." Jon Wiederhorn from Rolling Stone described the song as "a tear-stained ballad enhanced with sparse, nebulous horns and reverberating pedal steel guitar."

== Music video ==
The accompanying music video for the song was directed by Andy Baybutt. The video begins with several references to the Verve's earlier work. The band appears in the same formation and clothes as they did at the end of the video for "Bitter Sweet Symphony". The cover of the machine on the front of the album No Come Down also appears briefly. The band turns around a corner and walks over to a vending machine called "Feelings". This refers to the song "Life's an Ocean" from their second album, A Northern Soul, where Ashcroft sings, "I was buying some feelings from a vending machine" (the same vending machine is also seen on the back of that album). The rest of the video shows, partially in black and white, the band playing the song indoors. The video ends with a piece of burning wood, with the words 'Urban Hymns' written on it, floating on water. The original concept for the video was to have the band filmed in a maze to illustrate "loss of direction".

== Track listings ==
- UK CD1 and cassette single
1. "The Drugs Don't Work" (radio edit)
2. "Three Steps"
3. "The Drugs Don't Work" (original demo)
- UK CD2
1. "The Drugs Don't Work" (full length)
2. "Bitter Sweet Symphony" (James Lavelle Remix)
3. "The Crab"
4. "Stamped"
- UK 7-inch jukebox single

A. "The Drugs Don't Work" (radio edit) – 4:45
B. "The Drugs Don't Work" (original demo) – 4:44

- UK and European 12-inch single

A1. "The Drugs Don't Work" (radio edit)
A2. "Three Steps"
B1. "The Drugs Don't Work" (demo)
B2. "The Crab"

- Australian limited-edition CD single
1. "The Drugs Don't Work" (radio edit)
2. "Three Steps"
3. "The Drugs Don't Work" (original demo)
4. "Bitter Sweet Symphony" (original)

== Charts ==
=== Weekly charts ===
Chart (1997–1998)	Peak position
Australia (ARIA)	22
Belgium (Ultratip Bubbling Under Flanders)	2
Europe (Eurochart Hot 100)	8
Finland (Suomen virallinen lista)	9
France (SNEP)	72
Germany (GfK)	87
Iceland (Íslenski Listinn Topp 40)	9
Ireland (IRMA)	3
Israel (IBA)	13
Italy Airplay (Music & Media)	8
Netherlands (Single Top 100)	61
New Zealand (Recorded Music NZ)	10
Norway (VG-lista)	13
Scottish Singles Sales (Official Charts)	1
Sweden (Sverigetopplistan)	18
UK Singles (Official Charts)	1

=== Year-end charts ===
Chart (1997)	Position
Sweden (Topplistan)	92
UK Singles (OCC)	32

== Certifications ==
Region	Certification	Certified units/sales
United Kingdom (BPI)	Platinum	600,000^{‡}
^{‡} Sales+streaming figures based on certification alone.
