= The Last Time (Rolling Stones song) =

1965 single by the Rolling Stones

- 1965 US single picture sleeve

Single by the Rolling Stones
- B-side: "Play with Fire"
- Released: 26 February 1965 (UK): March 1965 (US)
- Recorded: 11–12 January 1965
- Studio: RCA, Hollywood, California
- Genre: Hard rock
- Length: 3:41
- Label: Decca (UK); London (US)
- Songwriter: Jagger–Richards
- Producer: Andrew Loog Oldham

The Rolling Stones UK singles chronology
"Little Red Rooster" (1964)	"The Last Time" (1965)	"(I Can't Get No) Satisfaction" (1965)

The Rolling Stones US singles chronology
"Heart of Stone" (1964)	"The Last Time" (1965)	"(I Can't Get No) Satisfaction" (1965)

Audio sample
- file; help

"The Last Time" is a song by the English rock band the Rolling Stones featuring the Andrew Oldham Orchestra, and the band's first original song released as an A-single in the UK. Written by Mick Jagger and Keith Richards, and recorded at RCA Studios in Hollywood, California in January 1965, "The Last Time" was the band's third UK single to reach number one on the UK singles chart, spending three weeks at the top in March and early April 1965. It reached number two in the Irish Singles Chart in March 1965, and was released on the US version of the album Out of Our Heads on 30 July 1965.

== Composition ==
Cash Box described "The Last Time" as "a raunchy, hard-driving romantic blueser about a twosome who are destined to split up".

Although "The Last Time" is credited to Jagger/Richards, its chorus is identical, in melody and lyrics, to "This May Be the Last Time", a gospel song recorded in 1954 by the Staple Singers. This in turn was an arrangement of the first part of a sermon recorded by Reverend J. M. Gates in 1926, "You May Be Alive, You May Be Dead, Christmas Day". In 2003, Keith Richards said: "'The Last Time' ... was basically re-adapting a traditional gospel song that had been sung by the Staple Singers, but luckily the song itself goes back into the mists of time."

The Rolling Stones' song has a verse melody and a hook (a distinctive guitar riff) that were both absent in the Staple Singers' version. Phil Spector, whose "Wall of Sound" approach can be heard on the recording, assisted with the production.

== Live performance ==
Footage exists of a number of performances of this song by the Rolling Stones in 1965: from the popular BBC-TV music show Top of the Pops, the 1965 New Musical Express Poll Winners Concert and American TV shows including The Ed Sullivan Show and Shindig!. A full live performance is also prominently featured in the 2012 re-edit of the 1965 documentary Charlie Is My Darling. The footage confirms that the rhythm chords and guitar solo were played by Keith Richards, while the song's distinctive hook was played by Brian Jones. In the August 1965 issue of Beat Instrumental, in reply to the question of "who plays the prominent figure on the Stones releases?", Keith Richards said "I played it on 'Satisfaction', Brian played it on 'The Last Time'. It all depends who thinks it up."

A popular song in the Stones' canon, it was regularly performed in concert during the band's 1965, 1966 and 1967 tours. It was left off their concert set lists until 1997–98, when it reappeared on the Bridges to Babylon Tour. It later appeared on some of the band's set lists in 2012–13 on the 50 & Counting tour.

== Personnel ==
According to authors Philippe Margotin and Jean-Michel Guesdon:

The Rolling Stones

- Mick Jagger – lead vocals (Note: Margotin and Guesdon are uncertain, but suggest Jagger may have also provided backing vocals.)
- Keith Richards – backing vocals, acoustic guitar, rhythm guitar, lead guitar (solo)
- Brian Jones – lead guitar (riff)
- Bill Wyman – bass
- Charlie Watts – drums

Additional personnel

- Jack Nitzsche – tambourine

== Charts ==
Chart (1965)	Peak position
Australia (Kent Music Report)	2
Austria (Ö3 Austria Top 40)	7
Belgium (Ultratop 50 Flanders)	4
Canada Top Singles (RPM)	9
Finland (Suomen Virallinen)	1
Ireland (IRMA)	2
Netherlands (Single Top 100)	1
Norway (VG-lista)	1
South Africa (Springbok)	7
Sweden (Kvällstoppen)	1
Sweden (Tio i Topp)	1
UK Singles (Official Charts)	1
US Billboard Hot 100	9
West Germany (GfK)	1

== The Andrew Oldham Orchestra version ==
In 1965, the Andrew Oldham Orchestra recorded the song for the album The Rolling Stones Songbook. The recording and its distinctive passage for strings was written and arranged by David Whitaker.

=== Copyright issue ===
In 1997, former Rolling Stones business manager Allen Klein, whose company ABKCO Records owns the rights to all Rolling Stones material from the 1960s, sued English rock band the Verve for using a sample of the Andrew Oldham Orchestra recording of "The Last Time" in their hit song "Bitter Sweet Symphony". The Verve had obtained a licence to use the sample, but Klein successfully argued that the band used more than the licence covered. The Verve were required to relinquish 100% of their royalties from their hit song to ABKCO and the songwriting credit was changed to Jagger/Richards/Ashcroft. Ashcroft was the lead singer of the Verve recording. This led to Andrew Loog Oldham, who owns the copyright on the orchestral rendition that was sampled, also suing the Verve.

In May 2019, Richard Ashcroft announced that the Stones had handed over their copyrights on the song to him.

== The Who version ==
"The Last Time"

Single by the Who
- B-side: "Under My Thumb"
- Released: 30 June 1967
- Recorded: 28 June 1967
- Studio: De Lane Lea, London
- Length: 3:02
- Label: Track
- Songwriter: Jagger/Richards
- Producer: Kit Lambert

The Who UK singles chronology
"Pictures of Lily" (1967)	"The Last Time" (1967)	"I Can See for Miles" (1967)

In 1967, after the imprisonment of Jagger and Richards on drugs charges, the Who recorded "The Last Time" and "Under My Thumb" as a single. The Who announced in an advertisement for the single:

The Who consider Mick Jagger and Keith Richards have been treated as scapegoats for the drug problem and as a protest against the savage sentence imposed on them at Chichester yesterday, The Who are issuing today the first of a series of Jagger/Richard songs to keep their work before the public until they are again free to record themselves.

The songs were rush recorded and the record appeared in shops in only one week. However, by the time the single was made available, Jagger and Richards had been released. As John Entwistle was away on his honeymoon he authorised the Who to do the record without him and bass parts were overdubbed by Pete Townshend. The UK-only release reached number 44 on the UK Singles Chart.

== Other renditions ==
Covers of the song were recorded by garage rock bands in the 1960s. The Sceptres, a group from Glen Ellyn, Illinois, recorded it as a B-side in 1965. The girl group the Debutantes recorded a version in the 1960s, but the track was not released until 2018.

The Buchanan Brothers included a cover of "The Last Time" in their self-titled 1970 album. American country music singer Bobby Bare covered the song on his 1978 album, Sleeper Wherever I Fall.

The Grateful Dead performed the song 70 times between 1990 and 1995, and continued to do so in their various later incarnations such as RatDog, Furthur and Dead & Company. An officially released Grateful Dead version from the Copps Coliseum in Hamilton, ON, Canada on 22 March 1990, can be found on the album Spring 1990: So Glad You Made It.

In 1997, country music group the Tractors covered the song on the album Stone Country: Country Artists Perform the Songs of the Rolling Stones. Their version peaked at number 75 on the Billboard Hot Country Singles & Tracks chart.

Australian singer John Farnham covered the song in 2002, as the lead single and title track of his 2002 album, The Last Time.

The same hook was sampled in several subsequent recordings by other artists, most notably in "Number 1" by Tinchy Stryder featuring N-Dubz, which reached number one in the UK Singles Chart, in the week of its official release on 20 April 2009.
