= Bitter Sweet Symphony =

1997 single by the Verve

Single by the Verve

from the album Urban Hymns
- B-side: "Lord I Guess I'll Never Know"; "Country Song"; "Bitter Sweet Symphony" (radio edit); "Bitter Sweet Symphony" (extended version); "So Sister"; "Echo Bass"
- Released: 16 June 1997
- Recorded: 1997
- Studio: Olympic (London, England)
- Genre: Britpop; alternative rock; pop rock; post-Britpop
- Length: 5:58 (album version); 4:33 (radio edit and video version); 7:50 (extended version)
- Label: Hut; Virgin
- Songwriter: Richard Ashcroft
- Producers: Youth; The Verve

The Verve singles chronology
"History" (1995)	"Bitter Sweet Symphony" (1997)	"The Drugs Don't Work" (1997)

Music video
- "Bitter Sweet Symphony" on YouTube

Audio sample
- file; help

"Bitter Sweet Symphony" is a song by the English rock band the Verve, released on 16 June 1997 by Hut Recordings and Virgin Records as the lead single from their third album, Urban Hymns. It was produced by Youth at Olympic Studios, London.

The Verve developed "Bitter Sweet Symphony" from a sample from a 1965 version of the Rolling Stones song "The Last Time" by the Andrew Oldham Orchestra, adding vocals, strings, guitar and percussion. After a lawsuit by the Rolling Stones' former manager, Allen Klein, the Verve relinquished all royalties to the Rolling Stones members Mick Jagger and Keith Richards, who were also added to the songwriting credits. In 2019, ten years after Klein's death, Jagger, Richards, and Klein's son ceded the rights to the Verve songwriter, Richard Ashcroft.

The music video features Ashcroft walking down a busy pavement in Hoxton, London, bumping into passersby. It was played frequently on music channels and was nominated for Video of the Year, Best Group Video and Best Alternative Video at the 1998 MTV Video Music Awards. It has been parodied in television advertisements and other music videos.

"Bitter Sweet Symphony" reached number two on the UK singles chart, and stayed on the chart for three months. In the US, it reached number 12 on the Billboard Hot 100. It was named the Rolling Stone and NME Single of the Year and was nominated for Best British Single at the 1998 Brit Awards. In 1999, it was nominated for the Grammy Award for Best Rock Song. "Bitter Sweet Symphony" has been named one of the greatest songs of the decade by several publications. It was included in two editions of Rolling Stone's "500 Greatest Songs of All Time".

== Recording ==
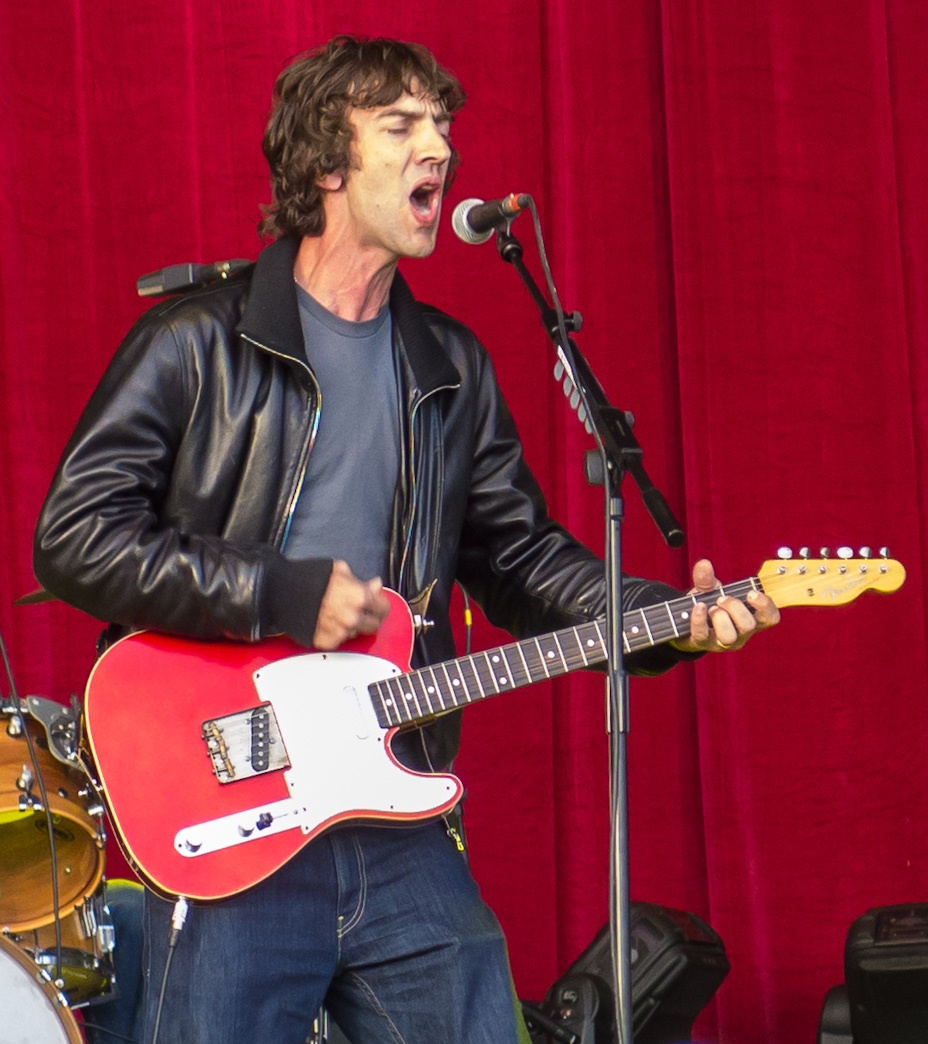
The Verve songwriter, Richard Ashcroft, in 2012

"Bitter Sweet Symphony" is based on a sample of a 1966 orchestral version of the Rolling Stones song "The Last Time" by the Andrew Oldham Orchestra. Andrew Loog Oldham was an early producer and manager of the Rolling Stones and enlisted musicians to create symphonic versions of Rolling Stones songs. The strings in the sample were written and arranged by David Whitaker.

The Verve songwriter, Richard Ashcroft, heard the Andrew Oldham Orchestra version of "The Last Time" and thought it could be "turned into something outrageous". The Verve sampled and looped four bars, then added dozens more tracks, including strings, guitar, percussion and layers of Ashcroft's vocals. Ashcroft said he imagined "something that opened up into a prairie-music kind of sound", similar to the work of composer Ennio Morricone, and that "the song started morphing into this wall of sound, a concise piece of incredible pop music". He likened the use of the sample to golden age hip-hop: "To take something but really twist it and fuck it up into something else. Take it and use your imagination."

The strings were arranged by Wil Malone, based on the melody in the sample. Malone expanded on the melody to add "bounce" and "jump". The strings were recorded in Olympic Studios, London, and performed by a group of 24 players. Malone instructed them to make the strings "tough" and "determined" rather than pretty or poetic.

"Bitter Sweet Symphony" was produced by Youth at Olympic Studios. According to Youth, Ashcroft initially recorded a version with the producer John Leckie but did not proceed with it; Youth persuaded him to record another version. Youth said: "It was only once we'd put strings on it that he started getting excited. Then, towards the end, Richard wanted to chuck all the album away and start again. What was my reaction? Horror. Sheer horror. All I could say was, I really think you should reconsider."

== Music ==
For MTV, Gil Kaufman wrote that "Bitter Sweet Symphony" was "built on a slow-rolling fat beat, a pomp and circumstance violin loop and ... elliptical, snake-swallowing-its-tail lyrics". Jon Wiederhorn of Rolling Stone wrote that it "intertwines baroque strings worthy of Pachelbel with sedated vocals and shimmering guitar lines". Malone observed that the song is built on a single chord, and likened it to Arabic music.

== Music video ==
Screenshot from the music video, with Ashcroft in Hoxton, London

The "Bitter Sweet Symphony" music video was directed by Walter Stern and released on 11 June 1997. In the video, Ashcroft walks down a busy pavement in Hoxton, London, oblivious to passersby and bumping into them. At the end, the other Verve band members join him and walk down the street into the distance. Critics likened it to the 1991 Massive Attack video "Unfinished Sympathy", which has the singer Shara Nelson walking in Los Angeles. The music video was played frequently on music channels and was nominated for a number of awards, including three MTV Awards at the 1998 MTV Video Music Awards.

The British comedy band Fat Les released a parody of the video for their 1998 song "Vindaloo", an alternative anthem for England at the 1998 FIFA World Cup. In the video, the comedian Paul Kaye, dressed as Ashcroft, walks down the same Hoxton pavement and is mocked by passersby. In 2015, the video was parodied in a television advertisement for Radio X that featured the DJ Chris Moyles walking down a street colliding with people. It triggered 106 complaints from viewers who felt the video was offensive and encouraged antisocial and violent behaviour.

In 2016, The Telegraph named Hoxton Street one of the locations that defined the Britpop era, and the Guardian journalist Francesca Perry included the video in a list of the best music videos about city life. Perry wrote that the video was a "historic snapshot" of Hoxton Street shortly before it was gentrified.

== Credits dispute ==
The Verve's record label, Virgin Records, acquired permission to use the "Last Time" sample from Decca Records, the owner of the recording. However, they did not obtain permission from the Rolling Stones' former manager, Allen Klein, the head of ABKCO Records, who owned the composition rights. When "Bitter Sweet Symphony" was about to be released as a single, Klein refused clearance for the sample, saying the Verve had used a larger portion than agreed. According to the Verve's guitarist, Nick McCabe, the dispute depended not on the sample but Ashcroft's vocal melody, which a musicologist determined was a half-time version of the Rolling Stones' "Last Time" melody.

Virgin played "Bitter Sweet Symphony" for the Rolling Stones members Mick Jagger and Keith Richards, who liked it but declined to become involved in the dispute. The Verve's co-manager, Jazz Summers, also sent a copy to Oldham, who wrote back: "Fair cop! Absolute total pinch! You can see why [ABKCO are] rolling up their sleeves."

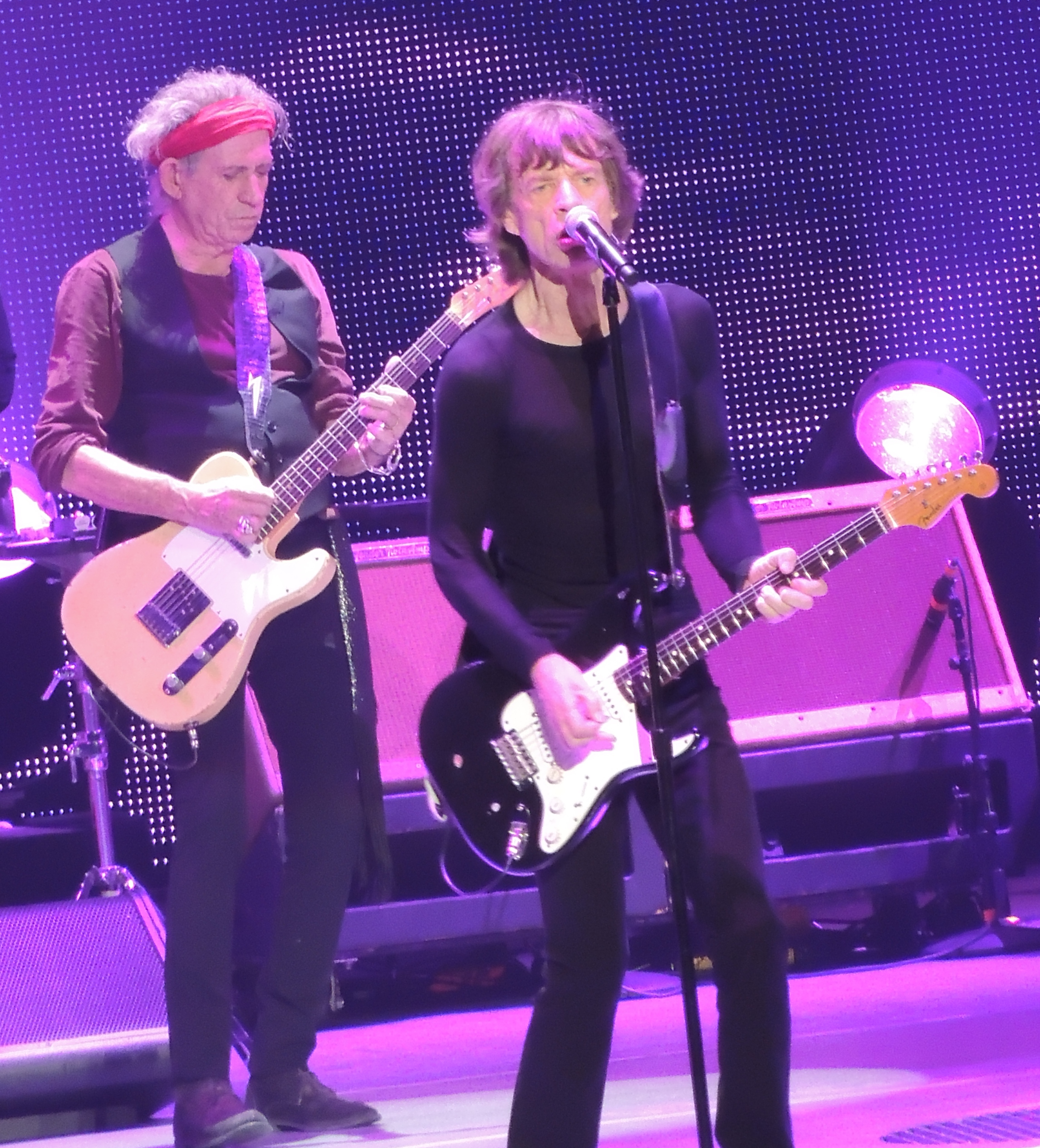
The Rolling Stones members Keith Richards (left) and Mick Jagger (pictured 2012) received sole songwriting credits until 2019.

Following a lawsuit, the Verve relinquished all royalties to Klein and the songwriting credits were changed to Jagger–Richards. Ashcroft received $1,000. His co-manager, John Kennedy, described it as "one of the toughest deals in music history". According to the Verve's bassist, Simon Jones, the Verve were told they would be given half the royalties, but when the single began selling well, they were instructed to relinquish 100% or remove it from sale.

Rolling Stone wrote that the outcome was "patently absurd", noting that Jagger and Richards were not involved with the sample or Ashcroft's melody and lyrics. Ashcroft said sarcastically that "Bitter Sweet Symphony" was "the best song Jagger and Richards have written in 20 years", and that it was the Rolling Stones' biggest UK hit since "Brown Sugar" (1971). Asked in 1999 whether he believed the situation was fair, Richards said: "I'm out of whack here, this is serious lawyer shit. If the Verve can write a better song, they can keep the money." David Whitaker, who wrote the string line in the "Last Time" sample, said in 2001: "The whole thing just makes one a bit sick, really."

In 1998, "Bitter Sweet Symphony" was used in a television advertisement for Nike. According to a statement released by the Verve's management, the Verve had a policy against licensing their music to advertising and would not have consented had they retained the rights to the song. As Virgin retained the synchronisation rights, the Verve received a percentage of the money earned from the advertisement. In 1999, Oldham sued ABKCO, saying he was owed up to £1 million in mechanical royalties for the use of the "Last Time" sample.

=== Return of credits to Ashcroft ===
In 2019, Billboard estimated that "Bitter Sweet Symphony" had generated almost $5 million in publishing revenue. In 2018, Ashcroft expressed his anger over the situation, saying: "Someone stole God-knows-how-many million dollars off me in 1997, and they've still got it ... Anyone, unless you are mentally ill, will always remember the day when 50 million dollars was stolen off them."

In early 2019, Ashcroft's managers approached Klein's son, Jody Klein, who became the head of ABKCO following Klein's death in 2009. He connected them to the Rolling Stones' manager, Joyce Smyth, who agreed to speak to Jagger and Richards. That April, ABKCO, Jagger and Richards agreed to return the "Bitter Sweet Symphony" royalties and songwriting credits to Ashcroft. Ashcroft announced the agreement in May, when he received the Ivor Novello Award for Outstanding Contribution to British Music from the British Academy of Songwriters, Composers, and Authors. He said it was a "kind and magnanimous" move, and said: "I never had a personal beef with the Stones. They've always been the greatest rock and roll band in the world. It's been a fantastic development. It's life-affirming in a way." In a statement, the Rolling Stones said they acknowledged the financial and emotional cost of "having to surrender the composition of one of your own songs".

== Sales ==
"Bitter Sweet Symphony" reached number two on the UK singles chart, and stayed on the chart for three months. In the US, it reached number 12 on the Billboard Hot 100 in 1998. As of May 2019, it had sold 1,276,209 copies in the UK. It was one of the most successful rock anthems of the decade.

== Reception ==
"Bitter Sweet Symphony" was named the Rolling Stone and NME Single of the Year for 1997. In 1998, BBC Radio 1 listeners voted it the third-greatest track of all time, and it was named the third-best single of 1997 by The Village Voice's Pazz & Jop annual critics' poll. In 1999, it was nominated for the Grammy Award for Best Rock Song. In a 2005 poll for the Channel 4 series 100 Greatest, the music video was voted the eighth best. The song received further exposure when it was used in adverts for Vauxhall and Nike.

On 2 July 2005, at the Live 8 concert in Hyde Park, London, Coldplay invited Ashcroft to perform the song with them during their set. They played it after only one rehearsal in Crystal Palace. Coldplay's singer, Chris Martin, introduced Ashcroft as "the best singer in the world" and described the song as "probably the best song ever written". The Guardian called it "one of the definitive British singles of the 1990s".

In 2007, NME named "Bitter Sweet Symphony" the 18th-greatest "indie anthem". In September 2007, a poll of 50 songwriters in Q named it one of the ten greatest tracks. In the Australian Triple J Hottest 100 of All Time, 2009, it was voted the 14th-best song of all time. Pitchfork named it the 29th-best track of the 90s, and included it in the 2008 book The Pitchfork 500. In 2011, NME named it the ninth-best track of the previous 15 years. Paste named "Bitter Sweet Symphony" the best one-hit wonder of the 1990s, writing that it was the only Verve song to make a "tremendous splash" internationally. Rolling Stone included it at number 382 in its 2004 list of the "500 Greatest Songs of All Time" and at number 392 in its 2010 list. In 2015, Rolling Stone readers voted it the third-greatest Britpop song, after "Common People" by Pulp and "Don't Look Back in Anger" by Oasis.

== Track listings ==
- UK CD1 and cassette single; Japanese CD single
1. "Bitter Sweet Symphony" (original)
2. "Lord I Guess I'll Never Know"
3. "Country Song"
4. "Bitter Sweet Symphony" (radio edit)
- UK CD2
1. "Bitter Sweet Symphony" (extended version)
2. "So Sister"
3. "Echo Bass"
- UK 12-inch single

A1. "Bitter Sweet Symphony (original)
A2. "Lord I Guess I'll Never Know"
B1. "Bitter Sweet Symphony" (James Lavelle mix)
B2. "Country Song"

- European CD single
1. "Bitter Sweet Symphony" (radio edit)
2. "So Sister"
- US CD and cassette single
1. "Bitter Sweet Symphony" (original) – 5:58
2. "Lord I Guess I'll Never Know" – 4:50
3. "So Sister" – 4:10
4. "Echo Bass" – 6:38

== Charts ==
=== Weekly charts ===
Chart (1997–1998)	Peak position
Australia (ARIA)	11
Austria (Ö3 Austria Top 40)	15
Belgium (Ultratop 50 Flanders)	21
Belgium (Ultratop 50 Wallonia)	18
Canada Top Singles (RPM)	5
Canada Rock/Alternative (RPM)	1
Europe (Eurochart Hot 100)	10
Finland (Suomen virallinen lista)	6
France (SNEP)	16
Germany (GfK)	37
Iceland (Íslenski Listinn Topp 40)	2
Ireland (IRMA)	3
Israel (IBA)	9
Italy (Musica e dischi)	7
Italy Airplay (Music & Media)	1
Netherlands (Dutch Top 40)	11
Netherlands (Single Top 100)	14
New Zealand (Recorded Music NZ)	15
Norway (VG-lista)	9
Scottish Singles Sales (Official Charts)	1
Spain (AFYVE)	2
Sweden (Sverigetopplistan)	10
Switzerland (Schweizer Hitparade)	15
UK Singles (Official Charts)	2
US Billboard Hot 100	12
US Adult Top 40 (Billboard)	8
US Mainstream Rock Tracks (Billboard)	22
US Mainstream Top 40 (Billboard)	23
US Modern Rock Tracks (Billboard)	4
US Triple-A (Billboard)	3

Chart (2019)	Peak position
US Hot Rock & Alternative Songs (Billboard)	13

=== Year-end charts ===
Chart (1997)	Position
Australia (ARIA)	62
Belgium (Ultratop 50 Flanders)	88
Belgium (Ultratop 50 Wallonia)	60
Europe (Eurochart Hot 100)	50
France (SNEP)	98
Iceland (Íslenski Listinn Topp 40)	8
Israel (IBA)	6
Netherlands (Dutch Top 40)	92
Netherlands (Single Top 100)	56
Sweden (Topplistan)	60
Switzerland (Schweizer Hitparade)	44
UK Singles (OCC)	43
US Modern Rock Tracks (Billboard)	84

Chart (1998)	Position
Canada Top Singles (RPM)	34
Canada Rock/Alternative (RPM)	27
US Billboard Hot 100	79
US Adult Top 40 (Billboard)	29
US Mainstream Rock Tracks (Billboard)	92
US Mainstream Top 40 (Billboard)	91
US Modern Rock Tracks (Billboard)	11
US Triple-A (Billboard)	5

== Certifications ==
Region	Certification	Certified units/sales
Australia (ARIA)	Gold	35,000^{^}
Brazil (Pro-Música Brasil)	Gold	30,000^{‡}
Denmark (IFPI Danmark)	Platinum	90,000^{‡}
France (SNEP)	Gold	250,000^{*}
Germany (BVMI)	Platinum	600,000^{‡}
Italy (FIMI)	2× Platinum	200,000^{‡}
New Zealand (RMNZ)	5× Platinum	150,000^{‡}
Spain (Promusicae)	2× Platinum	120,000^{‡}
United Kingdom (BPI)	5× Platinum	3,000,000^{‡}
United States (RIAA)	Gold	500,000^{^}
^{*} Sales figures based on certification alone.^{^} Shipments figures based on certification alone.^{‡} Sales+streaming figures based on certification alone.

== Release history ==
Region	Date	Format(s)	Label(s)	Ref.
United Kingdom	16 June 1997	7-inch vinyl; CD; cassette	Hut; Virgin	
United States	8 September 1997	Alternative radio	Hut; Virgin	
Japan	8 October 1997	CD	Virgin	
United States	11 November 1997	Contemporary hit radio	Hut; Virgin	
United Kingdom	2 March 1998	12-inch vinyl	Hut; Virgin	
United States	10 March 1998	CD; cassette	Hut; Virgin	
