= The Andrew Oldham Orchestra =

Musical project

The Andrew Oldham Orchestra was a musical side project in the mid-1960s created by Andrew Loog Oldham, the original manager and record producer of the Rolling Stones. There was no actual orchestra per se. The name was applied to recordings made by Loog Oldham using a multitude of session musicians, including members of the Rolling Stones.

The Rolling Stones Songbook included an orchestral version of the Rolling Stones song "The Last Time", which was slightly altered with a new version recorded by The Verve for their track "Bitter Sweet Symphony". The threat of litigation over the licence for the sample led to the entire copyright to the composition, belonging to Richard Ashcroft, the Verve's frontman, being taken by ABKCO Records, and the assignation of the songwriting credit to Jagger and Richards. At the 2019 Ivor Novello Awards, Ashcroft announced that Jagger and Richards had "signed over all their publishing for Bittersweet Symphony", ending the dispute.

== Discography ==
=== Albums ===
Year	Album	Record label
1964	Lionel Bart's Maggie May	Decca Records
1964	16 Hip Hits	Ace of Clubs Records
1965	East Meets West	Parrott Records
1966	The Rolling Stones Songbook	London Records
