= Love Is Noise =

2008 single by the Verve

Single by the Verve

from the album Forth
- B-side: "Let the Damage Begin" (live); "A Man Called Sun" (live); "Chic Dub"
- Released: 3 August 2008
- Length: 5:29 (album version); 4:02 (radio edit)
- Label: Parlophone
- Songwriters: Richard Ashcroft; Nick McCabe; Simon Jones; Peter Salisbury
- Producers: Chris Potter; The Verve

The Verve singles chronology
"The Thaw Session" (2007)	"Love Is Noise" (2008)	"Rather Be" (2008)

"Love Is Noise" is a song by English alternative rock band the Verve, the second track on their fourth album, Forth (2008). It was released as the first single from the album on 3 August 2008 as a digital download, with the physical release following on 11 August 2008 in the United Kingdom. The song received its first airplay by Zane Lowe on BBC Radio 1 on 23 June 2008.

The single debuted on the UK Singles Chart at number five after during first week of release via online download alone. The following week, the song peaked at number four and stayed five weeks in the UK top 10, giving the Verve their first top-10 hit since 1997 with "Lucky Man". It was their third UK top-five single and their fourth to crack the UK top 10. "Love Is Noise" also reached the top 10 in Ireland, Italy, and Sweden. The song's music video debuted on the band's Myspace page shortly before the song's release.

== Background ==
The song reworks lines from William Blake's poem "And did those feet in ancient time", commonly known as 'Jerusalem'. Where Blake begins "And did those feet in ancient time, / Walk upon England's mountains green?", "Love is Noise" asks: "Will those feet in modern times / Walk on soles that are made in China?", and alludes to "bright prosaic malls" in place of "dark Satanic Mills". This is the second time Richard Ashcroft has referenced Blake, following 1995's "History".

"Love Is Noise" derived from "Columbo", another song on the album. While recording that track, Ashcroft created a new loop on a vocoder and added it to the song, which was essentially a jam the band had been working on for a few days. The band continued adding to it until it evolved into a different track.

== Music video ==
The video for the song was released on the band's Myspace page on 9 July 2008. The video mixes up shots of the band performing in a dimly-lit room, with frontman Richard Ashcroft sitting on the floor, with montages of other images, including snow-capped mountains, a North Korean choreography, a couple about to kiss, a dancer and a blonde woman with an eagle.

== Live performances ==
The band played it at 2008's Coachella as the setlist's closer, something that was repeated in Glastonbury's Pyramid Stage on 29 June.

== Track listings ==
On 3 August a digital download of the "album version" of the song was released with the song's video in the iTunes Store. A week later, an exclusive iTunes Store bundle was released featuring a "Freelance Hellraiser" remix at the same time as another bundle featuring the "album version" and the physical format's B-sides. The physical formats (CD and 7-inch vinyl records) were released on 11 August 2008.

7-inch vinyl gatefold

1. "Love Is Noise"
2. "Let the Damage Begin" (live 2007)

7-inch clear vinyl

1. "Love Is Noise"
2. "A Man Called Sun" (live 2007)

CD single

1. "Love Is Noise"
2. "Chic Dub"

Digital download

1. "Love Is Noise"
2. "Love Is Noise" (music video) – 4:02

Digital EP

1. "Love Is Noise" – 5:27
2. "Chic Dub" – 6:09
3. "Let the Damage Begin" (live 2007) – 4:09
4. "A Man Called Sun" (live 2007) – 5:18
5. "Love Is Noise" (The Freelance Hellraiser remix) – 9:09

== Charts ==
=== Weekly charts ===
Chart (2008–2009)	Peak position
Australia (ARIA)	51
Austria (Ö3 Austria Top 40)	29
Belgium (Ultratop 50 Flanders)	26
Belgium (Ultratip Bubbling Under Wallonia)	2
Czech Republic Airplay (ČNS IFPI)	62
Denmark (Tracklisten)	18
Europe (Eurochart Hot 100)	8
Germany (GfK)	26
Hungary (Rádiós Top 40)	2
Ireland (IRMA)	7
Italy (FIMI)	8
Netherlands (Single Top 100)	65
New Zealand (Recorded Music NZ)	35
Scottish Singles Sales (Official Charts)	1
Slovakia Airplay (ČNS IFPI)	46
Sweden (Sverigetopplistan)	10
Switzerland (Schweizer Hitparade)	26
UK Singles (Official Charts)	4

=== Year-end charts ===
Chart (2008)	Position
UK Singles (OCC)	82

Chart (2009)	Position
Hungary (Rádiós Top 40)	64

== Certifications ==
Region	Certification	Certified units/sales
United Kingdom (BPI)	Silver	200,000^{‡}
^{‡} Sales+streaming figures based on certification alone.
