= A Storm in Heaven =

Studio album by Verve
- Released: 21 June 1993
- Recorded: December 1992 – January 1993
- Studios: Sawmills, Cornwall
- Genres: Psychedelic rock; shoegaze; space rock; dream pop
- Length: 46:58
- Labels: Hut; Vernon Yard
- Producer: John Leckie

Verve chronology
The Verve E.P. (1992)	A Storm in Heaven (1993)	Voyager 1 (1993)

Singles from A Storm in Heaven
- 1. "Blue" Released: 10 May 1993; 2. "Slide Away" Released: 20 September 1993

A Storm in Heaven is the debut studio album by the English rock band Verve, later the Verve, released on 21 June 1993 on Hut Records. The band had formed between school friends vocalist Richard Ashcroft, bassist Simon Jones, and drummer Peter Salisbury, with guitarist Nick McCabe joining shortly after. After a show in London, they signed to the Virgin Records imprint Hut Records in 1991, which released their first three singles in 1992. Following the appointment of the company Savage and Best as their management, the band recorded their debut album at Sawmills Studios in Cornwall with producer John Leckie. Referred to mainly as a psychedelic album, A Storm in Heaven was largely written in the studio.

"Blue" was released as the lead single from A Storm in Heaven in May 1993; initially, promotion saw them go on a UK tour, perform at Glastonbury Festival, and appear on a European tour with the Smashing Pumpkins. Following the release of the second single "Slide Away" in September 1993, Verve embarked on a headlining US tour and closed out the year on a UK tour with Oasis. They went on a headlining European tour in early 1992, prior to their stint on Lollapalooza, on which Salisbury got arrested and Ashcroft had to be hospitalized. They concluded promotion with a round of festivals in Europe, including the Reading Festival.

A Storm in Heaven received mixed reviews from music critics; though many largely praised the music, others were not content with its lyrical theme of death and its dark sound. Retrospective reviews and biographies of the Verve were more positive, also focusing on the music. The album peaked at number 27 on the UK Albums Chart, going on to be certified gold by the British Phonographic Industry (BPI) in 2014. "Blue" reached number 69 on the UK Singles Chart. In the following years, most of the album's listeners came to it after the release of the band's third studio album, Urban Hymns (1997); the band returned to the sound of the album through various songs on Urban Hymns and their second studio album, A Northern Soul (1995). It has appeared on best-of lists for the shoegaze genre by NME and Pitchfork.

== Background ==
While at school, Richard Ashcroft had the desire to make music but was unable to play any instrument. When he and his school friends Peter Salisbury and Simon Jones attended higher education, they had the idea of starting a band. Sometime later, Ashcroft heard Nick McCabe playing in a practice room at Winstanley College. After Ashcroft's mother bought him a guitar, he started a band with McCabe and a friend as the bassist. They went by the name the Butterfly Effect before it was changed to Raingarden. As Ashcroft was living in Wigan with Jones, and as their exams loomed, he asked Jones and Salisbury if they wanted to join his band. With their addition, the band re-christened themselves as Verve. Practice sessions followed, with them wanting to find their own sound and not bandwagon on the emerging Madchester movement, spearheaded by the Stone Roses and Happy Mondays. For almost a year, McCabe and Salisbury were unable to play another show, much to the chagrin of Ashcroft. He eventually persuaded the rest of the members to quit their jobs and accompany him on the dole in an effort to make the band work. They subsequently spent most of their time jamming in Wigan, securing frequent shows in the town, and recording a demo while in the house of Jones' parents.

At this stage, the Madchester movement had reached an endpoint. Ashcroft said A&R representatives were no longer looking for bands in the North. Coinciding with this, Dave Boyd started working at Virgin Records, accompanied by Miles Leonard, who left his job at Chrysalis Records. Leonard had told the head of A&R at that label about checking out Verve, whom he heard through their demo. After being told no, he shifted to Virgin, who let him travel to see the band in Manchester. Leonard arranged for the band to play a show for the whole A&R department of Virgin in London in July 1991; after this, they signed a publishing deal with Virgin Music. Boyd was moved by the performance that he signed them for, which happened in September 1991. They joined the roster of Hut Records, a subsidiary of Virgin, which consisted of bands from the Madchester scene and other acts that had little support. (Note: Though Hut Records was set up earlier that year, the company wanted to foster artistic growth instead of aiming for instant success. Hut had made a deal with Virgin Records, which allowed them a better financial situation than other independent labels.) Their next show in London saw them support Whirlpool; despite not sounding similar to them, Verve were tagged as part of the shoegaze scene. Between April and October 1992, Verve issued their first three singles, "All in the Mind", "She's a Superstar", and "Gravity Grave". During this time, Boyd, now having become the boss at Hut, was concerned for the band's direction and contacted Jane Savage of the PR company Savage and Best, asking if they would like to manage the band. The pair subsequently saw them at a show in London and were impressed, ultimately agreeing to take on the band, serving as both their managers and publicists. (Note: When Suede released "The Drowners" (1992), attention from the music press moved away from Verve and shoegaze, as the latter was being seen as outdated. Savage and Best were looking after various acts from that scene. Best said Ashcroft would come into their office and become annoyed by the number of front covers for magazines that the other bands Savage and Best were working with were getting. He mentioned that the frontmen for Pulp and Suede were more accessible to journalists who appeared to be "obsessed with lyrics rather than the guitar chords", while Verve were the opposite of that.)

== Recording ==
After shows supporting the Black Crowes, Verve set about to record their debut album. With a DAT machine and a mixing desk in tow, the band went to Wales, where they re-worked all the material they had, only keeping a fraction of it, such as "Slide Away" and "The Sun, the Sea". John Leckie approached Verve about producing them; he was known for his work with the Stone Roses, who were one of Ashcroft's influences. McCabe fixated on Leckie's work with the Fall instead, liking how he refined their sound. Leckie previously saw Verve in London when he initially went to see Whirlpool. Leckie was impressed to the point where he was actively searching gig listings for when they would perform again. Up to that point, he was known for achieving the best sound for newer bands, though he thought that there would be some difficulty in translating their sound onto a recording. Leckie was amazed by their "dynamics, how devastatingly loud they could be, and how quiet and sensitive they would be. At points you could hear a pin drop — and then it would just explode." Despite only having three songs – "Slide Away", "Already There", and "The Sun, the Sea" – newly written at this point, they went to Cornwall with the intent of making an album. The band recorded at Sawmills Studios, a converted mill situated next to the River Fowey, in December 1992 and January 1993. The sessions lasted seven weeks in total, with a break for Christmas 1992. As it was in an isolated area, they could only reach it by boat or by walking down a railway track when the tide was out. If their gear had not arrived by the same boat, they would be forced to wait for 12 hours for the tide to rescind. Its location meant that the band members would not be distracted.

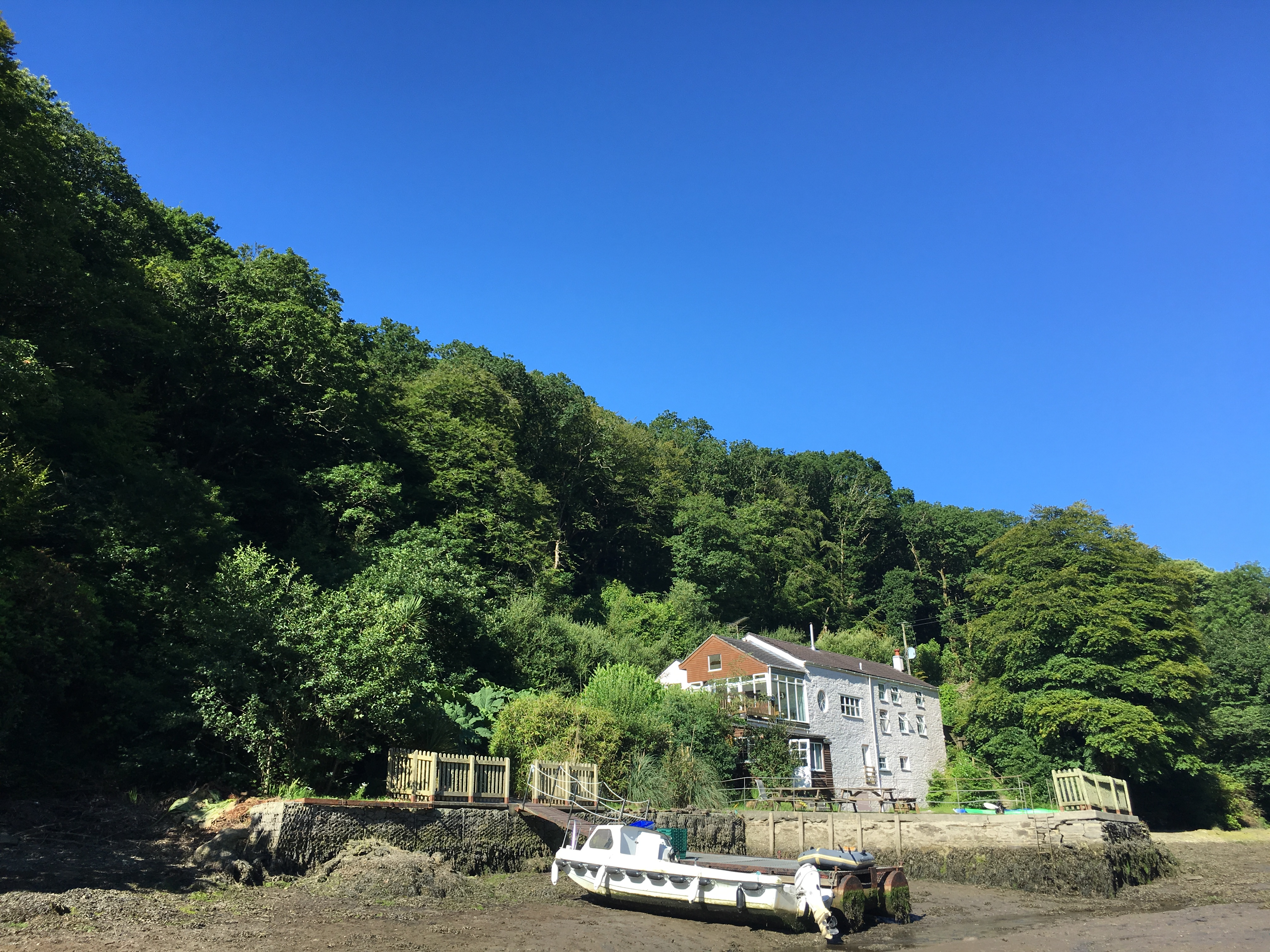
Sawmills Studios, located next to the River Fowey, is where Verve spent seven weeks recording A Storm in Heaven.

Making an album, as opposed to a one-off recording, made the members relax and not force themselves to make something special from the offset. Eight of the album's final songs came about through improvisational jamming. This working method was hit-and-miss productivity-wise, as five days could pass without anything substantial, while two songs might evolve in a brief period of time. Ashcroft compared it to looking at an empty canvas: "... you don't know what you're going to paint, but you know it's going to be great." He was absent for the majority of this writing, though when he was there, he thought of lyrics on the fly. Leckie focused on getting the right atmosphere instead of working with discipline, a method that McCabe preferred, having previously disliked their prior sessions for taking too much time setting up the drums and getting a particular bass sound. Leckie aimed to capture the band's live spirit when he saw them live. John Cornfield did engineering and programming throughout the sessions. Members of Verve did not like contemporary albums for being overproduced and too clean, wanting a "dirty" sound instead for their debut. Ashcroft's working method was to "record as if it's the last thing we're ever going to do, purely because you get the most out of yourselves." Sometimes, Leckie would alter McCabe's amplifier, only for him to change it back when the former left the room. Leckie had a Shure SM58 microphone facing the speaker cab, and Neumann U 67 directly against the cab. McCabe focused on the sound he got from his amp rather than his guitars, having recently acquired a Mesa/Boogie Mark III. During this time, other musicians were working with digital equipment and disregarding their guitar pedals; McCabe recalled that he found various delay pedals and samplers cheaply and experimented with them, going as far as to say A Storm in Heaven was "essentially me discovering all this equipment. Get a few pedals, see what sounds I could make, wait for a tune to come out of it."

Verve had struggled to record a satisfactory version of "Star Sail", finding prior attempts too clean-sounding. A version, recorded at 4 a.m. while the band was stoned, proved to be a turning point, as McCabe said Leckie helped show the band how they could sound. The initial guitar noise that starts this iteration was made by accident when McCabe, who was not aware they were already recording, was testing if his instrument was in tune. Author Sean Egan, in his book The Verve: Star Sail (1998), wrote that this one note of music symbolised the band's "off-the-cuff approach to the recording and their desire for a dirty sound." Oblivious that Leckie had begun recording the band, they started jamming with an unfinished song, and when they stopped, Leckie stunned them by asking if they wished to listen to it, which they liked and became "Star Sail". This spontaneous method also resulted in "Virtual World", which Ashcroft said was very "loose. We just had the chords – no words whatsoever. ... We got the atmosphere right." Two versions of this song were made, one with a flute and the other with a slide guitar part from McCabe. Leckie suggested the inclusion of horns on some of the songs; he has worked with Kick Horns, a group of session musicians, since the 1980s. They arrived down the railway track late one evening while Verve was playing back the material they had made up to that point. Kick Horns' usual method when working with a group would be to have a meeting or listen to material ahead of them travelling, with them working the following morning. For Verve, Kick Horns began working immediately through the early hours. (Note: As this was the first time Verve worked with outside musicians, Trevor Baker wrote in his book Richard Ashcroft – The Verve, Burning Money & The Human Condition (2008) that Kick Horns were thrilled to contribute "something new to the mix and taking the record away from basic rock." Tim Sanders of Kick Horns said Verve were searching for "texture and colour really more than melodic input." Leonard said the inclusion of horns made it border on Miles Davis territory, which Leckie expertly brought to the table.) Leckie mixed the recordings at Sawmills in early 1993; even when this process was underway, Ashcroft continued to write lyrics for the album, prompting their label to ask where the finished album was through aggressive phone conversations. Additional songs were recorded during the sessions that were ultimately left off the finished album, including "6 O'Clock", "No Come Down", "Shoeshine Girl", "South Pacific", "Twilight", and "Where the Geese Go".

== Composition and lyrics ==
=== Title and themes ===
Phill Best proposed the album's name be Storming Heaven, taken from the 1989 book of the same name by Jay Stevens, which discusses American culture handling the effects of LSD. Best added, "how [the drug] was a shortcut to Nirvana ... so I said [to Ashcroft] you should call it 'storming heaven' because that's what your music does. I thought this was a good euphemism for what their music did," before Ashcroft altered it to A Storm in Heaven. Discussing the name, Ashcroft said he preferred music that can immerse the listener, making them "feel calm and soothing, and then hurt you a little bit more." Baker thought that the title was appropriate since the songs were made and recorded in a small timeframe. The album featured a "coherence that, for all the brilliance of their later albums, they would never achieve again. Every member of the band knew what a Verve song sounded like and they were all pulling in the same direction."

Ashcroft sought influence in anything he could, with the mundanity of life, such as having meaningful conversations or getting drunk, and the less grounded topics, like looking at a dead body on a street. In addition to those, allusions to galaxies and suns were another obvious theme. Egan said the lyrics were distinctly metaphoric, with Ashcroft choosing to keep a reclusive "ambiguity in his work. He disdained the video culture which now tended to do pop consumers' thinking for them: rather than force feeding people images, he wanted their imaginations to run wild." Radhika Takru of Drowned in Sound said the band did not lament a breakup; more so, they contemplated the "inevitability of its demise." He said a listener can witness "someone struggling to stay nonchalantly afloat when in reality, they're far out of their depth (standard youthful stupidity)."

=== Music ===
Ryan Dombal of Pitchfork explains that A Storm in Heaven "lives in that liminal state between jam and song, spontaneity and structure. It’s not calculating, but it never veers into sheer indulgence, either." As the band did not wish their debut to be a collection of hits, their first three singles were left off the track listing. Ashcroft retrospectively said it would have been a rip-off if it had their previous singles on it, preferring it to be "totally different, it's an actual event." He wanted to "make it special", an approach that Egan said "included textures created by additional instruments, including the flute, horns, accordion, and piano. Ashcroft would later assert that he was a believer in natural sounds and that Verve's attempt to be the future wasn't undermined by using classical instruments." The band wrote songs through jamming, prior to Ashcroft adding vocals to what they came up with. Best said they would practice without a vocal melody, resulting in drawn-out instrumental portions, which Ashcroft would scat over. Leckie saw this as a negative, as Ashcroft "would never know what he was singing and he'd never know when the chorus would come. They would have all these different sections and they'd make the changes by the nod." The Kick Horns' contributions, which Ilic referred to as "stunningly ambient brass sections", can be heard on "Already There" and "The Sun, the Sea", which took their cues from the parts on Fun House (1968) by the Stooges. Nick McCabe's guitar work is characterized as "offer[ing] color and clarity to Ashcroft’s grand pronouncements, his tone—gentle as a butterfly one minute, squalling like the sea the next—providing the sort of nuance his singer could never quite pull off." According to Dombal, "McCabe gave Ashcroft’s ambitions a soul to search for."

An issue Ashcroft had with contemporary bands was them trying too hard to emulate one particular influence, whereas for Verve, they took in varied inspirations that they were not fanatics of one specific band; they soaked up many acts; "then in turn you don't rip [one of] them off, because you've got so much going on there in your head." A few onlookers thought this comment of Ashcroft's was a bit impractical, as aspects of several specific acts could be heard, such as Can, the Doors, Echo & the Bunnymen, Funkadelic, Led Zeppelin, and My Bloody Valentine, among others. Author Martin Clarke, in his book The Verve: Crazed Highs + Horrible Lows (1998), wrote that if someone was to agree or disagree with Ashcroft's assertion, it was down to a difference of opinion, though in a time when Suede and Blur were upfront about channelling the work of acts from the 1970s and 1960s, respectively, Ashcroft was "right not to feel tainted." Despite this, Salisbury's drum parts took influence from those heard in Gris-Gris (1968) by Dr. John. In addition to their usual roles, members of Verve contributed additional instruments to the recordings. Ashcroft with percussion on half of the album's tracks and guitars on "See You in the Next One (Have a Good Time)"; McCabe with piano on "Beautiful Mind" and "See You in the Next One (Have a Good Time)", keyboard on "Make It 'Til Monday", and accordion on "See You in the Next One (Have a Good Time)"; Salisbury with percussion on "Star Sail" and "Virtual World"; and Jones with backing vocals on "Star Sail".

A Storm in Heaven has been referred to as dream pop in the styles of Pale Saints and Ride, noise rock, space rock, and shoegaze. Ryan Leas of Stereogum said, depending on how listeners characterise shoegaze, A Storm in Heaven was likely an underrated release in the genre, also proposing that it could be an "excellent psychedelic" album. Al Shipley of Spin, journalist Neil McCormick in The Nation, Steve Ciabattoni of CMJ New Music Report, Nick Southall of Stylus Magazine, and author Michael Heatley in his book Rock and Pop: La historia Completa (2007) also highlighted the psychedelic sound of the album. McCabe considered parts of the album to be a precursor to the post-rock scene and acts like Tortoise. Gary Walker of Guitar.com wrote that the album's "lysergic character is defined by McCabe's stratospheric guitar sound", adding that he could hear the playing styles of the Durutti Column, Robin Guthrie of Cocteau Twins, Eddie Hazel of Funkadelic, Joy Division, and John Martyn, while summarising that McCabe sounded unique. He used a variety of Fender and Gibson-branded guitars connected to various effects units, such as the Alesis-made Quadraverb and Watkins Copicat, which were running through Mesa/Boogie or Roland-branded amplifiers.

== Songs ==
=== Tracks 1–5 ===
The album opens with "Star Sail", which Baker said starts with a "deceptive blast of feedback and then a series of wireless cries from Richard against a slow, shimmering wave of guitar." McCabe used the Eventide 300, an effects unit he claimed to be the best ever created, to give the song its texture. When Ashcroft's voice comes through, it is heard in the distance, where he sounds disoriented and on the edge of breaking down and, as Baker writes, "stumbling blindly through the cosmos." Ashcroft was aided by Mark Corley, a friend of the band, on backing vocals. Baker acknowledged that there were numerous acts creating this style of brooding space rock during the time, though only a few incorporated an "underlying edginess that came out of this apparent confusion and spontaneity", providing an "almost disturbed quality" for Verve that was lacking in their peers. Clarke thought the song was hazy and drenched in feedback, serving as a template for the big-sounding psychedelia on the rest of the album, "complete with squalling guitars and white noise", while Ashcroft's "troubled mind is immediately apparent" in the lyrics. Rudi Abdallah of Drowned in Sound said Jones and Salisbury, the rhythm section of the band that governs the "tides of delay with voluptuous grooves, are our life raft upon which we drift under McCabe's abrasively graceful squall."

"Slide Away" was the second-ever song the band had composed. Their interest in rock and roll is showcased in it, with Baker calling it a highly confrontational "take on the same formula." Beginning akin to the work of Ride, as the song progresses, McCabe displays varied playing styles, from riffs akin to the work of Led Zeppelin to a wall of sound. The track was a live favourite at shows, which translated well to a recording, showing the soft and quiet to loud noise dynamic that initially piqued Leckie's interest in the band. Philip Wilding, author of The Verve: Bitter Sweet (1998), said it teased that there was more to the band than simply "moody ramblings and the inability to bring a song in at under six minutes." For the last 50 seconds of the song, Leas said Ashcroft's vocal wrestles with the increasing sound of the guitar work as it envelops him, "but in the end he takes the song's advice and lets the currents carry him away."

Baker said "Already There" shifts from light guitar sounds into "something that churns and grinds furiously before dropping back down again." Ashcroft improvises his vocals in the moment, which Baker said they nearly come across as "beat poetry as Richard virtually speaks his lyric over the surface of the music, never reaching any kind of climatic chorus, fading out along with the music." Clarke said Ashcroft regurgitates his stepfather's theories and ideas in the lyrics; it is the only song in their catalogue where Ashcroft and McCabe collaborated on the lyrics. Abdallah thought it had an outro section that expands like the "musical equivalent of the Book of Revelations. McCabe creates a vortex of light and fire, inducing fevered ecstasy as feedback elevates Ashcroft's tortured cries to the stratosphere." The Washington Post writer Mark Jenkins said the combination of guitars and wavering vocals in the track evokes the work of Cocteau Twins. "Beautiful Mind" is a country-esque song, with McCabe's slide guitar higher in the mix while the vocals are pushed further down. Baker said this gave the track a sense of "woozy melancholia."

Baker said "The Sun, the Sea" starts with an abrasive guitar part and, surprisingly, a section of horns, giving way to Ashcroft's strongest vocal performance so far, gliding on top of a Spaghetti Western-like soundscape of "ominous riffs and further blasts from the wind instruments." Leas remarked that it clashes like a wave can, keeping in line with half of the song's title, offering a "generally aqueous vibe that dominates" the rest of the album. Baker observed that it lacked chorus sections, "but do they need to? The song finishes with an exhilarating, discordant attack from the horn section and then a confused jangle of guitars." AP Childs of Gigwise said the music "comes on all mushroom-head with a groove that is Soft Machine freeform meshed with Planet Gong sax runs." MusicOMH's Ben Hogwood pointed out the obvious inspiration from Echo & the Bunnymen and said it earns its "aggression through McCabe's wall of sound to paint a vivid picture of the sea spray."

=== Tracks 6–10 ===
"Virtual World" is a folk song in the vein of Tim Buckley. Baker said it is one of the more out-there tracks on the album, as its simple rhythm structure "treads water slightly but its overlaid, bizarrely," with a flute solo in the vein of progressive rock. Yvette Lacey played a flute during the chorus section, while Simon Clarke of Kick Horns did the flute solo, the latter of which was recorded in two takes. Lager said Lacey's playing enhances the melancholic atmosphere of the track. Baker said that in "Make It 'Til Monday", the band entered into a dream-like headspace as far as they were able to: "There's a bare shimmer of guitar in the background, some gentle riffs in front of that and then Richard's voice sounding like it's coming from a long way beyond the grave; weirdly serene and out there, tripping in opposite directions to the music." In the track, Ashcroft recounts how he made it through a drug trip that lasted for a weekend.

"Blue" evolved out of McCabe playing one guitar part, reversing it, and playing over that. Baker suggested that the intensity of Ashcroft's vocals was connected to the effort that went into its lyrics, adding that at particular moments, Ashcroft provides a caution to the lister, "in their most powerful chorus so far, [as] it turns into a taunt." He noticed that McCabe's guitar parts were surprisingly combative and "truculent. There are still elements of the dreaminess and trippiness of their earlier singles but 'Blue' is more like a bad trip or a nightmare." Leas said it was the odd one out when compared to the other songs, rippling on a repeating pattern that signals an obvious "'This is the single' structure amongst the more listless textures that otherwise dominated the record." Martin Clarke and Egan saw it as the band's most commercial song up to that point, with the latter writing it was "focused and disciplined and with a sugary coating their music had thus far lacked." Wilding said it "somehow managed to be intangible yet ludicrously close to magnificent, that hints appeared suggesting Verve had the grace to fortify Ashcroft's dramatic boasts."

"Butterfly" has a blues-esque rhythm section with slide guitar on top until it shifts into a musical bed of psychedelic music, where Ashcroft can be heard repeating the song's title. Its name stems from Ashcroft being interested in chaos theory and the concept that a butterfly fluttering its own wings in one area can have consequences in a different area. Walker remarked that it descended into Doors-esque free-form improvisation. Clarke thought it was the "most specifically lyrical track on the album," and that it also featured McCabe's best guitar part, "with a threatening riff and subtle texture that reinforced his fast-developing reputation as one of Britain's most creative guitarists." McCabe said it has its origins in him and Ashcroft playing around with a Steely Dan loop, where he was "making bonker noises, hitting my guitar, stoned out of me mind as well..."

"See You in the Next One (Have a Good Time)" came about during one 4 a.m. session when Ashcroft was playing a piano, despite his lack of skills on the instrument. It was subsequently completed in 20 minutes. Baker remarked that "unsurprisingly," it stood out from the other tracks on the album, having a clearer atmosphere. He added that Ashcroft's voice was lower in the mix and still intentionally obscured, yet the "relative simplicity of the song prefigured what he would do later. Over a gentle melody, played by Nick, he croons gently, proving, as he'd always said, that the country rock of his solo albums didn't come out of nowhere." Lager proposed that it is sung from the perspective of Ashcroft's mother to his deceased father.

== Artwork and packaging ==
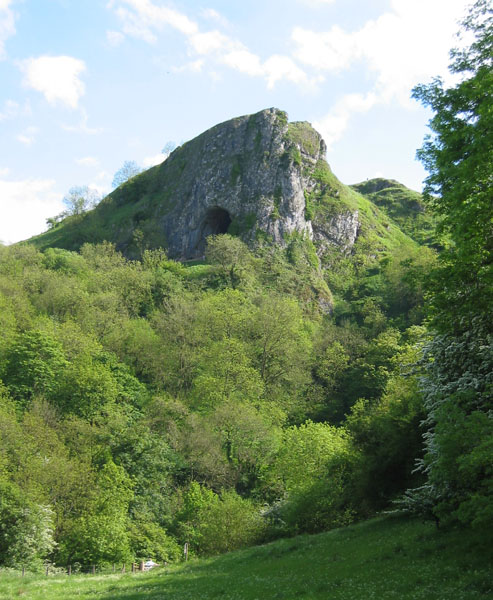
Thor's Cave from the outside, the inside of which was featured on the cover of A Storm in Heaven.

=== Front cover ===
Boyd wanted to use the photograph that ultimately went to the "She's a Superstar" single for their album. Brian Cannon of the design company Microdot and photographer Michael Spencer Jones assured him that they could create something better. Ashcroft previously met Brian Cannon while at a party in Wigan during the former's college period. Ashcroft was interested in Cannon's work at the time; two years later, when Verve got signed, the pair reconnected. Baker said Cannon was influenced by the "magnificently overblown, psychedelic music," featured on the album and set out to idealise a concept that could accompany it. Baker said the artwork shows a "ghostly figure at the mouth of a cave in front of the letters VERVE in flames and then inside [the sleeve] was a whole series of different vignettes of the band and their friends." The image was taken at Thor's Cave, situated at the peak of a hill in Staffordshire; the entranceway was scaled to a height of 10 metres and a width of seven and a half metres. The band was fascinated with the cave's history of mythology, including Paleolithic grave sites and it being the resting place of the wife of an 8th-century martyr.

Like with their artwork previously, the band's name was included in the image itself as opposed to being written later on. Spencer Jones hired a friend of his to weld big metal letters, which were then dragged to the cave. Spencer Jones had expressed interest in taking photographs of a band in a cave and found Thor's Cave while on a walk with his girlfriend. It dawned on him that the best angle was not from outside the cave but rather from the interior facing outwards. Cannon thought that the metal letters should be alight, which, when combined with the blue illumination of the cave itself, worked well on a colour level. Spencer Jones said it appeared "obvious that it looked like a womb", so they had a shadowy figure coming through at the end. He thought it was an acceptable method of bringing in an element of humanity without involving someone inside the cave. It was only after this that they thought about the concept of the cycle of life. On each occasion they tried to light the wicks atop each metal letter, the V would go out before they were able to light the E.

=== Gatefold and back cover images ===
Cannon said he had been a fan of bands that used gatefold sleeves for their albums and wanted to employ that for Verve. The artwork collectively took circa three or four months to create and details the cycle of life. He explained that the front cover acted as "birth — the cave's like a vaginal opening in the mountain in the background." The gatefold photos show the "recklessness of youth" as a burning car is seen while members of the band sit nearby and play chess, taken in Billinge, Wigan. This was followed by the "hopelessness of middle-life", depicted with a man sitting and watching a TV, concluding with "death with the guy in the graveyard." The former was taken in a cellar in Up Holland, Lancashire, while the latter, used for the back cover, was shot in Birkdale Cemetery in Southport with a man wearing Ashcroft's clothing.

One of the gatefold sleeve images shows the members either reading a newspaper or having a game of chess next to a farmhouse as a car is burning in the background. Cannon said the vehicle was a Citroën found in a Wigan scrapyard that they purchased for £50. It lacked an MOT and was illegal to drive on a road. They got it to the residence of Paul Frodsham, a friend of Ashcroft. The former manager of the band, Dave Halliwell, poured the petrol on it and almost immolated himself. The idea for a burning car came from Ashcroft, who wanted it set in an urban environment, but Spencer Jones thought it would send the wrong type of statement. "It was too much of an aggressive image — an urban setting with a car on fire. What's that saying? It was good to juxtapose that against very peaceful setting. You're getting this ultra violence if the burning car juxtaposed, literally, with this very bucolic, most like a 19th century, setting."

Spencer Jones proposed using diesel as it was "more of a viscous liquid and it would burn better and cling to the car better", though everyone else decided on petrol instead. He remarked that none of them knew that petrol emits more fumes than diesel, "so there was this huge cloud of petrol vapour surrounding the car". Halliwell was tasked with lighting the car using a flintstone-type torch. They spent a few occasions putting petrol on the car and Halliwell lighting it, but the fire rescinded each time, causing them to repeat the process. Eventually it dawned on them that it did not look like it was on fire, and they decided to soak the entire vehicle. Spencer Jones said when Halliwell went to light it this time, "it exploded. Basically it caught fire and the fire went back on to him." As the fire spread through the car, Spencer Jones would have the band members in the frame for a few seconds in order to get some shots and move them out of the vicinity of the car. "In the picture that appeared on the cover, they look very relaxed like they've been there for some time but they've just literally adopted that position. Then a second later they were up again."

== Release and name change ==
In May 1993, Billboard reported that Verve's debut studio album was planned for release the following month. Record companies PolyGram and Deutsche Grammophon filed a suit against Verve on 7 May 1993 at the US District Court in Los Angeles, California, claiming trademark infringement. It was in regards to Verve Records; PolyGram issued releases through this jazz imprint, while Deutsche Grammophon owned the rights to the label's name. All members of the band and Caroline Distribution, Hut and Virgin Records were listed as defendants in the suit, which alleged that their "activities were likely to cause confusion, mistake or deception as to the source of origin" of the band's releases. It sought an injunction to halt sales of any release bearing Verve's name, with damages to be determined. According to Savage, the label said that if someone were to go to a record store and exclaim, "'I want a new Verve record' and they'd be given a record by this British pop group when they obviously want a jazz record." The band relegated the suit to lawyers while they focused on promoting their upcoming album. Discussions for a name continued for a month, with suggestions of renaming to Verv so that they could call their album Dropping an 'E' for America.

Verve had the idea of having market research done in the US to see if product confusion would have occurred. This would have been a costly move, in addition to the legal fees from defending against the suit. A Storm in Heaven appeared in the US as intended through Vernon Yard Recordings, a subsidiary of Virgin Records, on 15 June 1993, where it was distributed by CEMA, owned by Virgin Records' parent company, EMI. It was released in the UK on 21 June 1993 through Hut Records. Clarke described the album's context: "Surrounded by Suede's rejuvenated London-centric Bowie-isms, Blur's defining Modern Life Is Rubbish tirade, and the mainstream successes of grunge, the album sat uncomfortably among its contemporaries." During the final date of their late 1993 UK tour, it was reported that the band had settled out-of-court with Verve Records, which saw the band amend their name to the Verve. (Note: In June 1993, Vernon Yard label director Keith Wood issued a statement mentioning that he was "puzzled and disappointed" by PolyGram's suit, saying that a customer was unlikely, for example, to confuse A Storm in Heaven with a box set by Verve Records artist Charlie Parker. He went on to say that PolyGram reissued recordings by Angel despite having no concern if customers confused them with Angel Records. Baker said as "bizarre as it might sound now to everybody who knows them as The Verve, this new name took quite some getting used to. When they started the group, it seemed like it was mandatory for every new band to have a one syllable name — Moose, Ride, Lush, Curve, Blur — it was a long time before 'The ...' bands were to return to favour in the early Noughties.") While amending the name avoided legal fees, the Verve still had to pay £25,000 to Verve Records for requiring the band to tack on the definite article instead of changing it entirely.

On 4 January 1994, it was announced that Hut Records was to be distributed by EMI, following the expiration of a deal with distribution companies RTM and Pinnace. Ray Cooper, the deputy managing director at Virgin Records, said that Virgin felt that Hut had now "achieved a degree of maturity which makes it appropriate to bring its distribution in-house." Egan said this meant that Hut could no longer be considered an independent label, making their releases ineligible to chart on the Independent Charts, which the Verve's prior releases had appeared on. Boyd was unfazed by the situation, though he criticized Virgin, he thought that it would help Hut "move up a gear."

A Storm in Heaven was re-pressed on vinyl in 2016; that same year, an expanded version of the album was issued, including B-sides, EP tracks, BBC Radio 1 session material, and a DVD of a 1992 live performance. Alongside this, two outtakes from the recording sessions, "Shoeshine Girl" and "South Pacific", were also featured in the set. "Slide Away" and "Blue" were included on the band's second compilation album, This Is Music: The Singles 92–98 (2004), while music videos for both were featured on the video album of the same name.

=== Singles ===
"Blue" was released as the album's lead single on 10 May 1993. "Twilight", "Where the Geese Go", and "No Come Down" were included as its B-sides. "Blue" was issued to modern rock radio stations in the US in July 1994. Two music videos were made for "Blue": one aimed for the US market, shot in Dublin, Ireland; and the other, aimed for the British market, filmed in Islington, London. The latter version starts with the members going to a party located in a cellar with an "eerie little girl who looks like she belongs in The Exorcist. She's staring at them as Richard starts losing it spectacularly. In the end, as they walk out of the house and up into the cave featured in the cover of A Storm in Heaven, it's hard to tell whether they're as out of it as they seem or whether they're just acting."

"Slide Away" was issued to modern rock radio stations in the US in May 1993. It was released as a single in the UK on 20 September 1993, in the midst of their European tour. "6 O'Clock" was included on the seven-inch vinyl record version, while acoustic renditions of "Make It 'Til Monday" and "Virtual World" were featured on the CD edition. At this stage, the label was comfortable spending more money on the band, allowing them to shoot a video for it in Spain with director Richie Smith. The video was aimed at the US market, where "Slide Away" was selected as the first single in that territory over "Blue". The video shoot took place in the village of San José in Spain, while a portion was filmed in a brothel in Almería, an area that made Ashcroft think of movies by David Lynch. Baker said Smith had "decided that they needed something seedier and darker than their normal setting" and picked the brothel, "complete with resident prostitutes looking bored in the background." Another scene in it sees Ashcroft being submerged in the sea close to San José. Baker thought it was a "strange decision" to pick it as the first American single for the album in lieu of "Blue". He theorised that it was due to the "'American' sound, with epic guitars and more of a widescreen feel than the disturbing claustrophobia" of "Blue". The song was "also slightly more shoe-gazy, initially, a bit like Ride and maybe that's what the American label expected from British bands at the time."

== Touring ==
Verve went on a UK tour to promote the release of "Blue", ending in June 1993. They then performed at Glastonbury Festival; their guitars had been stolen from their touring van, prompting them to borrow equipment from one of the other acts on the bill. Alongside this, McCabe's amplifier stopped working partway through one track and, in the end, had to be escorted off stage after playing for 15 minutes longer than their allotted set time. The band went to the US for some showcase performances the following month. This consisted of one show in Los Angeles, California, two appearances as part of the Lollapalooza touring festival in New Jersey, and ending with a gig in New York City. Unlike prior years, Verve were the only British act on the 1993 iteration. In August 1993, they went on a European tour with the Smashing Pumpkins. On 28 September 1993, the band played a secret show at Astoria 2 in London for the show The Beat, performing alongside James, Swervedriver, and the Wonder Stuff. In October and November 1993, Verve embarked on their first headlining tour of the US, with support from American labelmates Acetone, and closed out the year with a headlining UK tour, with support from Acetone and Oasis. The first 100 attendees of each show were given a flexi disc containing the Glastonbury performance of "Make It 'Til Monday".

Verve's reputation as troublemakers was exacerbated by connecting themselves with up-and-comers, Oasis. Cannon had met guitarist Noel Gallagher when Microdot split its offices with the Inspiral Carpets, when Gallagher worked for them. (Note: When Gallagher learned that Cannon did the artwork and designs for the Verve's music, he told Cannon that he was starting a band – Oasis – and wanted him to work with them. Cannon then made the artwork for Oasis' debut album, Definitely Maybe (1994), which also had a track called "Slide Away".) He gave Cannon a demo, which Cannon played for Ashcroft, who was impressed by "Live Forever" (1994), promptly adding them to the tour. In February 1994, the band went on their first headlining stint of mainland Europe, with support from Oasis. They had to pull out of their scheduled 1994 Glastonbury performance as Salisbury had broken his ankle when a picture frame landed on it. On the doctor's orders, he would have to stay in plaster for 10 weeks. The incident also meant that shows in London and the US had to be cancelled. The Verve played two US shows in late June 1994, one each in Hollywood, California, and San Francisco, California, both intended as warm-up performances for Lollapalooza. They performed with Lollapalooza between 7 July and 5 August 1994, appearing on the second stage, which was created to showcase newer or esoteric acts alongside the Flaming Lips, Luscious Jackson, Rollerskate Skinny, and the Frogs.

Ashcroft did not like the size of the second stage, which was often situated in car parks or similar locations, though he embraced the task of converting new people to their fan base. Issues plagued the band during the Kansas City, Missouri, date of the trek on 11 July 1994. Salisbury and a tour crew member were arrested after chucking $400 worth of furniture out of a hotel window. They were placed in a cell, though they were released when bail was made two hours later. Jones and McCabe witnessed Salisbury being escorted from the premises, but were distracted by a drug dealer they met. Jones, McCabe, and Salisbury eventually returned in time for their slot at Lollapalooza. When Ashcroft left the stage, he did not feel well. A drinking session the night before, coupled with the 110-degree heat, made him start convulsing. Ashcroft was taken to the hospital when Best explained that he had neither eaten nor drunk any water. Upon arriving, it was found that he was seven pints short of the typical body fluid level. The following day, he was able to perform in time for the next show in Minneapolis, Minnesota. Returning to the UK, the Verve played a one-off show at Clapham Grand in London. Following this, they made a handful of festival performances in mainland Europe, including Hultsfred in Sweden, and to make up for cancelled shows earlier in the year, they appeared at the Reading Festival.

== Contemporary reviews ==
Original release
Review scores
Source	Rating
Los Angeles Times	3/4 stars
NME	8/10
Q	2/5 stars
Select	3/5
Vox	6/10

Egan wrote that A Storm in Heaven was met with mixed reviews upon its release in 1993, while Baker noted that some reviewers considered it too dark-sounding and focused on the theme of death. Defending this, Ashcroft said that they had "always been a dark band, dark in a way that can be quite frightening", adding that he thought "you're a fool if [death]'s not in your mind. My father died when I was eleven. If I died the same age as my dad, I'd only have eighteen years left. That's terrifying. So that gives you an urgency." Egan said that, contrasting with the response to their early singles, there was not much in the way of negative press for A Storm in Heaven, and the positive reviews "tended to be totally ecstatic." Ilic said commentators attached several different terms, calling the album variously "abstract, illusory, soothing, tinged with feedback, hypnotic, etc. - take your pick."

Many reviewers praised the music. Alternative Press writer Dave Seagal mentioned that while the band was not inventive, they reworked other styles of music with renewed vigour, adding that the band "just let their music flow – people who value tightness above all in music probably won't like Verve." David Stubbs, writing for Melody Maker, said the band has "found something beyond noise, beyond shoegazing, beyond grunge, beyond U2, beyond ambient. Verve has found the pot of gold at the end of the post-modern rainbow!" The staff at Billboard noted that the band took some cues from Ride, though they were superior to their influences because of the "well-focused songs and distinctive axe-attack" from McCabe. NME's Danny Frost felt that the band did not sound limp-wristed anymore, despite there being "some of the prettiest noises ever to escape from amplifiers" on the album. Lorraine Ali of the Los Angeles Times said this album made "its mark regardless", calling it a "warm, inviting chill-out." Toledo Blade writer Mikel Lefort said never has the title of an album "so deftly described its contents. The band's dark fluidity is ruffled only by the dull thunder" of McCabe's guitar parts. Craig McLean of Vox noted that "song structure and silly things like choruses are subservient to atmosphere and vibes." In a review for Select, journalist Andrew Collins wrote that it was "self-consciously rockier and more macho than Slowdive, the guitar often an aggressor ... On occasion, it actually sounds like The House of Love on valium."

Some critics were mixed about the music. Jenkins remarked that when viewed alongside their contemporaries, the band was "neither the stormiest nor the most heavenly", feeling that the album "overemphasizes ambience." The staff at The Sunday Times said that if someone "torture[d] the sound to this degree, you begin to convey the impression that you don't believe in the songs; and while there are some rather flimsy wails here, there are also some more robust rockers which don't benefit from carrying this much baggage." Journalist Stuart Maconie writes in Q that the band is "good at atmospherics but not good with tunes." Other reviews spotlighted Ashcroft's role in the band. Ali praised his "whimsical, occasionally soul-wrenching vocals breeze in and out of delicate guitar interludes and hallucinatory washes of tumbling melody." Seagal thought Ashcroft's vocal "somehow enlarges to match the music ..." Spin writer Martin Aston said that when Ashcroft sang, his "queasy tone confirms that Verve ... has more to do with struggling to offset the onrush of adolescent disillusionment than with dream-drug escapism."

== Retrospective reviews and accolades ==
Retrospective reviews
Review scores
Source	Rating
AllMusic	4/5 stars
Classic Rock	6/10
Drowned in Sound	10/10
Gigwise	9/10 stars
The Line of Best Fit	9/10
Mojo	4/5 stars
PopMatters	9/10 stars
Record Collector	5/5 stars
Rolling Stone Germany	3.5/5 stars
The New Rolling Stone Album Guide	3.5/5 stars

Retrospective reviews focused on the music of A Storm in Heaven. Journalist Rob Sheffield in The New Rolling Stone Album Guide called A Storm in Heaven a "top-notch debut, full of long, druggy jams, shoegazing guitar excursions, and Mad Richard's shambolic, shamanic vocals." AllMusic reviewer Greg Prato wrote that when revisiting it nowadays, he saw it as an "interesting and original musical direction, since at the time, angst-ridden Seattle bands ... were all the rage." He noted that while some of the tracks tease at the band's latter-day "penchant for composing pop gems", several of the "longer tracks are just as strong," such as "Already There". Hogwood said the album "confirms them to be far more than your average guitar-led quartet from the North of England." Record Collector writer Tim Peacock said the album was largely "dominated by otherworldly, echo-laden delights such as Star Sail and the deceptively bucolic Virtual World and its headily elusive, psychedelia-streaked beauty has remained gloriously intact" in the years that followed. Ian King of PopMatters said the album's most fascinating tracks are the ones that were able to "naturally ebb and flow in a zone somewhere between pop editing and the looser jamming of the material that turned up on their singles and EPs." For Rolling Stone Germany, journalist Sassan Niasseri said the album was for shoegaze fans that "didn't stand on the dance floor, but saw themselves on rowing boats in stalactite caves, like the sighing role models Echo & The Bunnymen." The Line of Best Fit's Ed Nash noted that Ashcroft was "disdainful of the indie scene and wanted mainstream success for the band. The majority of the songs in A Storm in Heaven weren't going to give him that ..." Abdallah wrote that there was a battle between Ashcroft's "self-doubt and the band's panoramic soundscapes provides us with opportunities for self-examination." Journalist Mark Beaumont, in a review for Classic Rock, commented that apart from "Star Sail" and "Blue", the album had not "aged well, essentially 47 minutes of 'Mad' Richard Ashcroft formlessly wailing to be let out of guitarist Nick McCabe's psychedelic wind tunnel."

Biographers of the band highly praised the album. Baker called the album an "incredible achievement. Some groups take years to find their own distinct sound, many never do at all but Verve had managed it first time." Ilic said it was a "league away from Suede, Blur and the emerging Britpop fracas. It may not have been the album that set the commercial glove alight, but it was still good enough to leave the fading baggy and shoegazing scenes trailing in its wake, collectively gasping for breath and unable to focus on through the ensuing dust." He added that if the listener "looked hard enough, you could just make out Verve's wiry vocalist in the distance, clicking his heels together before turning into a dot and swaggering over the horizon." Clarke thought that the album was an "impressive, albeit patchy debut" that continued the "formless sings swathed in cloaks of noise" of their early singles "with only a smattering of traditional tracks," highlighting "Blue" and "Slide Away". For the rest of the album, he thought it was "shapeless without being aimless, with the band's spacey backdrop proving at least a worthy sound for Richard's impressive and at times other-worldly, yet still melodic vocals." He compliments Leckie for drawing a "new level out of Richard's vocals, giving him an abrasive touch that was often desperately needed amongst Verve's more self-indulgent ramblings." Wilding said it displayed a grandiose "sweep of psychedelia, but promised something approaching a point of focus with songs like the aforementioned Blue and Star Sail."

The Ridgefield Press included "Butterfly" on their list of the best tracks from 1993. A Storm in Heaven was ranked by NME at number 473 on their 2013 list of the 500 best albums of all time. The publication went on to rank it at number nine on their list of the ten best shoegaze albums, while Pitchfork placed it at number six on their list. PopMatters ranked the 2016 expanded edition of the album, with a similar reissue of A Northern Soul, at number ten on their list of the best 25 re-releases from the year, while Rolling Stone included the two sets on their unranked list.

== Commercial performance and legacy ==
A Storm in Heaven initially peaked at number 27 in the UK Albums Chart, and topped the UK Independent Albums chart. The album's 2016 reissue re-entered the main UK chart at number 84. It was certified silver and gold in the UK by the British Phonographic Industry (BPI) in 2013 and 2014, respectively. "Blue" reached number 69 on the UK Singles Chart.

Writer Alex Niven, in his 2014 33⅓ book on Oasis' Definitely Maybe, suggested that in addition to the visual influence of the album, its music was inspired by A Storm in Heaven. He went on to call the Verve's album as "very much like a darker, weirder cousin" to Definitely Maybe, and highlighted the echo-enhanced guitar work from McCabe as a factor. Jenell Kesler of It's Psychedelic Baby! Magazine said the majority of the album's listeners came to it following the release of the Verve's third studio album, Urban Hymns (1997), "then walked the cat backwards, discovering this highly intoxicating bit of wanderlust." Mark Lager of Under the Radar said the album "stood apart from other albums that decade [of the 1990s] (and subsequent albums in the band's discography) because of Nick McCabe's guitar soundscapes." The Verve returned to the sound of A Storm in Heaven on "So It Goes" from their next album, A Northern Soul (1995), and "This Time" from Urban Hymns. Walker said the opening moments of "The Sun, the Sea" reappeared in the former album's "This Is Music" and the latter album's "The Rolling People". Leckie said they "came close [to perfecting A Storm in Heaven] but neither they nor I thought they managed it. It lacked the overwhelming effect of the Verve experience, maybe as there was no audience to feed off." He added that the performances in the recordings were better than their previous, early release, but thought that the songs overall were lacking in quality. McCabe referred to the finished album as a recording of works-in-progress; Leonard said McCabe thought it could be improved, unable to be completely happy "with the result, whether it was a recording or a live show." McCabe found it difficult to work with Leckie, who had different ideas in his head from what McCabe wanted. He went as far as to say, "I don't really think he knows how to record guitars."

== Track listing ==
All songs written by Simon Jones, Peter Salisbury, Nick McCabe and Richard Ashcroft. All tracks produced by John Leckie.

No.	Title	Length
1.	"Star Sail"	3:59
2.	"Slide Away"	4:03
3.	"Already There"	5:38
4.	"Beautiful Mind"	5:27
5.	"The Sun, the Sea"	5:16
6.	"Virtual World"	6:20
7.	"Make It 'Til Monday"	3:05
8.	"Blue"	3:24
9.	"Butterfly"	6:39
10.	"See You in the Next One (Have a Good Time)"	3:07
Total length:		46:58

== Personnel ==
Personnel per booklet, except where noted.

Verve

- Richard Ashcroft – vocals, percussion (tracks 3–6 and 8), guitars (track 10)
- Nick McCabe – guitars, piano (tracks 4 and 10), keyboard (track 7), accordion (track 10)
- Peter Salisbury – drums, percussion (tracks 1 and 6)
- Simon Jones – bass, backing vocals (track 1)

Additional musicians

- Kick Horns – horns and horn arrangements (tracks 3 and 5)
  - Simon Clarke (also performed the flute solo on track 6)
  - Tim Sanders
  - Roddy Lorimer
- Yvette Lacey – chorus flute (track 6)
- Mark Corley – backing vocals (track 1)

Production and design

- John Leckie – producer, mixing
- John Cornfield – engineering, programming
- Brian Cannon – sleeve concept, design, art direction
- Michael Spencer Jones – photography

== Charts and certifications ==
=== Weekly charts ===
Chart performance for A Storm in Heaven
Chart (1993)	Peak position
Australian Albums (ARIA)	184
UK Albums (Official Charts)	27
UK Independent Albums (Music Week)	1

=== Certifications ===
Certifications for A Storm in Heaven
Region	Certification	Certified units/sales
United Kingdom (BPI)	Gold	100,000^{*}
^{*} Sales figures based on certification alone.
