= Slide Away (The Verve song) =

Single by Verve

from the album A Storm in Heaven
- Released: 20 September 1993
- Studio: Sawmills
- Genre: Shoegaze
- Length: 4:03
- Label: Hut
- Songwriters: Nick McCabe, Richard Ashcroft, Simon Jones, Peter Salisbury
- Producer: John Leckie

Verve singles chronology
"Blue" (1993)	"Slide Away" (1993)	"This Is Music" (1995)

"Slide Away" is a song by the English rock band the Verve. The song was taken from the band's first album A Storm in Heaven. Although the single was not a success on the conventional charts, the song shot straight to the top of US Indie Rock charts throughout 1993, and due to the popularity of the song The Verve were invited onto the successful 1990s alternative rock festival, Lollapalooza, in the following year, 1994.

In March 2005, Q magazine placed "Slide Away" at number 82 in its list of the 100 Greatest Guitar Tracks.

"Slide Away" was used in the 1994 film The New Age. It was also used in the episode "Ugly" of the American television series House M.D.

== Music video ==
The music video features the band walking and hitchhiking through a rural area. Later on, the band plays inside a brothel. The video ends with the band socializing with the prostitutes.

== Track listing ==
- CD HUTCD 35
1. "Slide Away"
2. "Make It Til' Monday" (acoustic version)
3. "Virtual World" (acoustic version)
- 7" HUT 35
1. "Slide Away"
2. "6 O'Clock"
- 12" HUTT 35
1. "Slide Away"
2. "Make It Til' Monday" (acoustic version)
3. "Virtual World" (acoustic version)

=== US version ===
In 1994, "Slide Away" was released for the American market - with a different track listing. The single was distributed by American label Vernon Yard Recordings.

- CD promo DPRO-12790
1. "Slide Away"

== Personnel ==
Personnel per A Storm in Heaven CD booklet.

- Richard Ashcroft – vocals
- Nick McCabe – guitars
- Peter Salisbury – drums
- Simon Jones – bass
