= New Shores (Black Submarine album) =

Studio album by Black Submarine
- Released: 10 March 2014
- Recorded: UK, Denmark: 2012-2013
- Genre: Experimental rock
- Length: 58:18
- Label: Black Submarine, AWAL
- Producer: Nick McCabe

Black Submarine chronology
The Kurofone EP (2011)	New Shores (2014)

Singles from New Shores
- 1. "Here So Rain" Released: 3 March 2014; 2. "Heart First" Released: 8 June 2014

New Shores is the only studio album by English rock band Black Submarine, released on 10 March 2014. The album was produced in Denmark and the United Kingdom at Nick McCabe's studio on Walworth Road at Elephant and Castle junction between 2012 and 2013.

The album was preceded by lead single "Here So Rain" published on SoundCloud and YouTube in January 2014 before a digital single of the radio edit in March 2014. The band released a video for "Heart First" on 22 April 2014, and the song was released in June 2014 as the album's second single.

== Track listing ==
All tracks are written by Nick McCabe, Simon Jones, Davide Rossi, Mig Schillace and Amelia Tucker

No.	Title	Length
1.	"Black Submarine"	7:22
2.	"Here So Rain"	8:17
3.	"Heart First"	6:08
4.	"The Love in Me"	3:42
5.	"Move Me a Mountain"	2:37
6.	"Is This All We Feel"	7:18
7.	"Everything That Happened to Me Is You"	5:49
8.	"Lover"	6:52
9.	"Heavy Day"	4:09
10.	"You've Never Been Here"	6:04
Total length:		58:18

CD and Digital Deluxe Edition Bonus Tracks
No.	Title	Writer(s)	Length
11.	"Just a Second Away"	Charley Bickers, Nick McCabe, Si Jones, Davide Rossi, Mig Schillace	5:42
12.	"Starling"	Bickers, McCabe, Jones, Rossi, Schillace	3:22
13.	"Together"	McCabe, Jones, Rossi, Schillace	4:40
Total length:			72:04

== Personnel ==
- Nick McCabe - guitar, producer
- Simon Jones - bass
- Davide Rossi - vocals, strings, keyboards
- Mig Schillace - drums
- Amelia Tucker - vocals
- Charley Bickers - vocals on "Just a Second Away" and "Starling"
- Jim Spencer - mixed by
- Frank Arkwright - mastered by at Abbey Road Studios
- Elly McCabe - vocals on "Lover"
