= The Draft EP =

EP by The Nova Saints
- Released: 28 May 2007
- Recorded: Summer 2005, Autumn 2006, Spring 2007
- Genre: Psychedelic rock Alternative rock Shoegazing
- Length: 16:52
- Label: HR4 Records; Northern Star Records
- Producer: The Nova Saints, Paul Corkett, Nick McCabe

The Draft EP is the debut release by Bristol-based band The Nova Saints, released on 28 May 2007. The EP was limited to 500 copies on its initial release but has been re-released twice since, most recently by Northern Star Records in a limited run of 200, to mark The Nova Saints' signing to the label.

== Recording ==
The majority of The Draft EP was recorded at Moles Studio in Bath, Somerset and is made up of tracks that were originally intended as demos. The tracks "The Draft" and "Slow Down" were recorded live in one take, though there were some overdubs on "The Draft".

Speaking to The Blog That Celebrates Itself in 2009 about the EP, singer Steve Waterhouse said: "We were only just finding our feet as a recording band during that time - something we've become a lot better at, which I think will show on the next record. I think the fact that it was recorded live comes through and that’s something we’re all really pleased about. There's a looseness that you can only get from playing live."

== Release and reception ==
Professional ratings
Review scores
Source	Rating
Click Music	4.5/5 stars
Music-News.com	5/5 stars
The Organ	Single of the Week
Rockfeedback.com	4/5 stars

The Draft EP was released through Rough Trade Shops on the band's own HR4 Records on 28 May 2007. The EP received favorable reviews with The Organ commenting "You get a glorious hint of how good they are live here with this delicious four track EP... they are absolutely brilliant at what they do... one hell of a fine band, one hell of a fine EP" and God Is in the TV calling it "The kind of delicious shoegaze/psych-rock that once made Ride and early Verve so viscerally thrilling."

== Track listing ==
CD HR4001

1. "The Draft" – 2:59
2. "Slow Down" – 4:47
3. "High Roller" – 3:22
4. "Far Out (Nick McCabe Remix)" – 5:42
- The track "High Roller" appears on the Northern Star Records compilation Psychedelica Three.
