= Blue (The Verve song) =

Single by Verve

from the album A Storm in Heaven
- Released: 10 May 1993
- Studio: Sawmills (Golant, England)
- Length: 3:24
- Label: Hut
- Songwriters: Nick McCabe, Richard Ashcroft, Simon Jones, Peter Salisbury
- Producer: John Leckie

Verve singles chronology
"Gravity Grave" (1992)	"Blue" (1993)	"Slide Away" (1993)

"Blue" is a song by English rock band the Verve. It was released as the first single from their first album, A Storm in Heaven, which was released through Hut Records. The song peaked at number 69 on the UK Singles Chart. The video shows the band down a dark alleyway in Islington, London. There was a separate video for the US, which was filmed in Dublin.

An alternate mix of "Blue" subtitled (USA mix) was released on No Come Down, a compilation album of b-sides released in May 1994.

== Track listing ==
- CD (HUTCD 29)
1. "Blue"
2. "Twilight"
3. "Where the Geese Go"
4. "No Come Down"

== Personnel ==
Personnel per A Storm in Heaven CD booklet.

- Richard Ashcroft – vocals, percussion
- Nick McCabe – guitars
- Peter Salisbury – drums
- Simon Jones – bass
