= The Nova Saints =

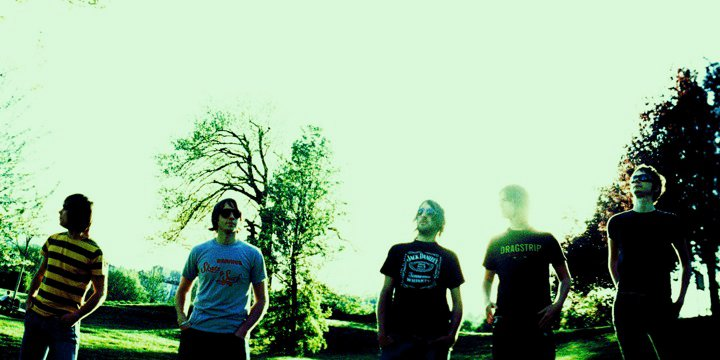
- The Nova Saints on Brandon Hill, Bristol

Background information
- Origin: Bristol, England
- Genres: Psychedelic rock Alternative rock Shoegazing
- Years active: 2006 – 2012
- Label: Northern Star Records
- Members: Steve Waterhouse; Dom Gallagher; John Banks; Matt Goddard; Tom Chillcott
- Website: MySpace; Facebook

The Nova Saints (or Nova Saints) are a Bristol-based band whose musical style is most commonly referred to as 'shoegazing' and 'psychedelic'.

Their debut album Newfoundland was released in the UK in November 2011.

== History ==
=== Spencer (2003–2006) ===
The first incarnation of the band that would become The Nova Saints formed in Hereford in 2003 as Spencer, a modish garage band, albeit with a heavy shoegaze influence. The band was initially formed purely to provide a support act to a friend's band. The primary members were John Banks, Steve Waterhouse, Dom Gallagher, Gareth Children and Tom Chillcott and the name was a throwback to a band the four members played in as teenagers. In 2004 Spencer expanded their line-up by adding keyboardist Matt Goddard to augment their increasingly shoegaze influenced sound.

After more gigs in and around Hereford the band relocated en masse to Bristol where they moved in together, living, sleeping and rehearsing under the same roof whilst immersing themselves in the Bristol music scene. It was here that they came to the attention of former Verve guitarist Nick McCabe who helped produce their early demos and guested on stage with them at 2006's Ashton Court Festival, his first live appearance since the break-up of The Verve in 1998. By this time the band had changed their name to The Nova Saints.

=== Name change and The Draft EP (2006–2008) ===
The continuing influence of psychedelia and neo-psychedelia along with increasing dissatisfaction with their throw-away moniker led to a name change in mid-2006 to The Nova Saints. The origins of this name are unknown, though it has been variously suggested that it was inspired by William S. Burroughs' novel Nova Express, indie band Pale Saints and the 1986 film Short Circuit.

Late 2006 saw The Nova Saints enter Moles Studio in Bath, Somerset to record tracks for what would become their debut release The Draft EP. They returned in early 2007 to re-record early demo track "Sugar Coated" for inclusion on Northern Star Records' Psychedelica Volume 2 compilation. The Draft EP itself emerged a couple of months later to positive reviews. This was followed by a national tour, the first of two in 2007, and a return to the studio in the autumn to record more tracks – one of which, "Lights", appears on the Northern Star compilation Revolution in Sound.

2008 began with another headlining tour, their largest to date, and saw the band feature in the O2 Wireless documentary Bristol: Our Music.

=== Hiatus and debut album (2008–2010) ===
In the summer of 2008, The Nova Saints went on something of a hiatus from live performance, honouring their bookings but thereafter playing just the occasional gig for longtime supporters Northern Star Records or opening up for friends' bands.

In April 2009, the band entered the studio to begin work on their debut album. On 26 April 2010 it was announced that The Nova Saints had signed to Northern Star Records.

=== Newfoundland (2011) ===
On 11 August 2011, it was announced that The Nova Saints' debut album, Newfoundland, would be released on 31 October 2011 through Northern Star Records. Featuring 12 songs written over the course of the band's first 3 years together, the album is a mixture of brand new recordings of previously unheard songs and re-recordings of Nova Saints 'classics', all recorded between 2009 and 2011 by Mat Sampson at Bink Bonk, Bristol.

=== Breakup and Refoundland (2012–2013) ===
During a shambolic gig supporting The Telescopes at the Brixton Windmill on 9 June 2012, The Nova Saints announced from the stage that they were breaking up and that this would be their last ever gig. This was confirmed the following day on their Facebook page along with news that the band would put out one final release.

On 16 February 2013, The Nova Saints' Facebook page announced the release of Refoundland, a remix album featuring reworkings of songs from Newfoundland by Northern Star Records affiliated acts Delicasession, Punk TV, Youngteam, The Lost Rivers and Head in the Shed as well as a brand new track from The Nova Saints themselves.

== Band members ==
- Steve Waterhouse – vocals, electric guitars, acoustic guitars
- Dom Gallagher – electric guitars, 'glide' guitar, backwards guitar, electric sitar, E-Bow, Space Echo, Deluxe Memory Man, samples, additional guitar sounds
- John Banks – bass guitar, vocals, electric guitars, acoustic guitars, synth guitar, 'glide' guitar, electric sitar, Fender Rhodes, white noise
- Matt Goddard – Juno-6, Pro-One, K-Station, Mellotron, Hammond organ, Fender Rhodes, Wurlitzer, piano, E-Bow, samples, white noise
- Tom Chillcott – drums, vocals, percussion

== Discography ==
=== EPs ===
- The Draft EP (2007)

=== Albums ===
- Newfoundland (2011)

=== Compilation appearances ===
- Psychedelica Volume 2 (2007)
- Psychedelica Three (2008)
- Revolution in Sound (2009)
- Psychedelica 5 (2013)
