= Thor's Cave =

Cave and archaeological site in the United Kingdom

Coordinates: 53.09176°N 1.85422°W

- Thyrsis's Cavern
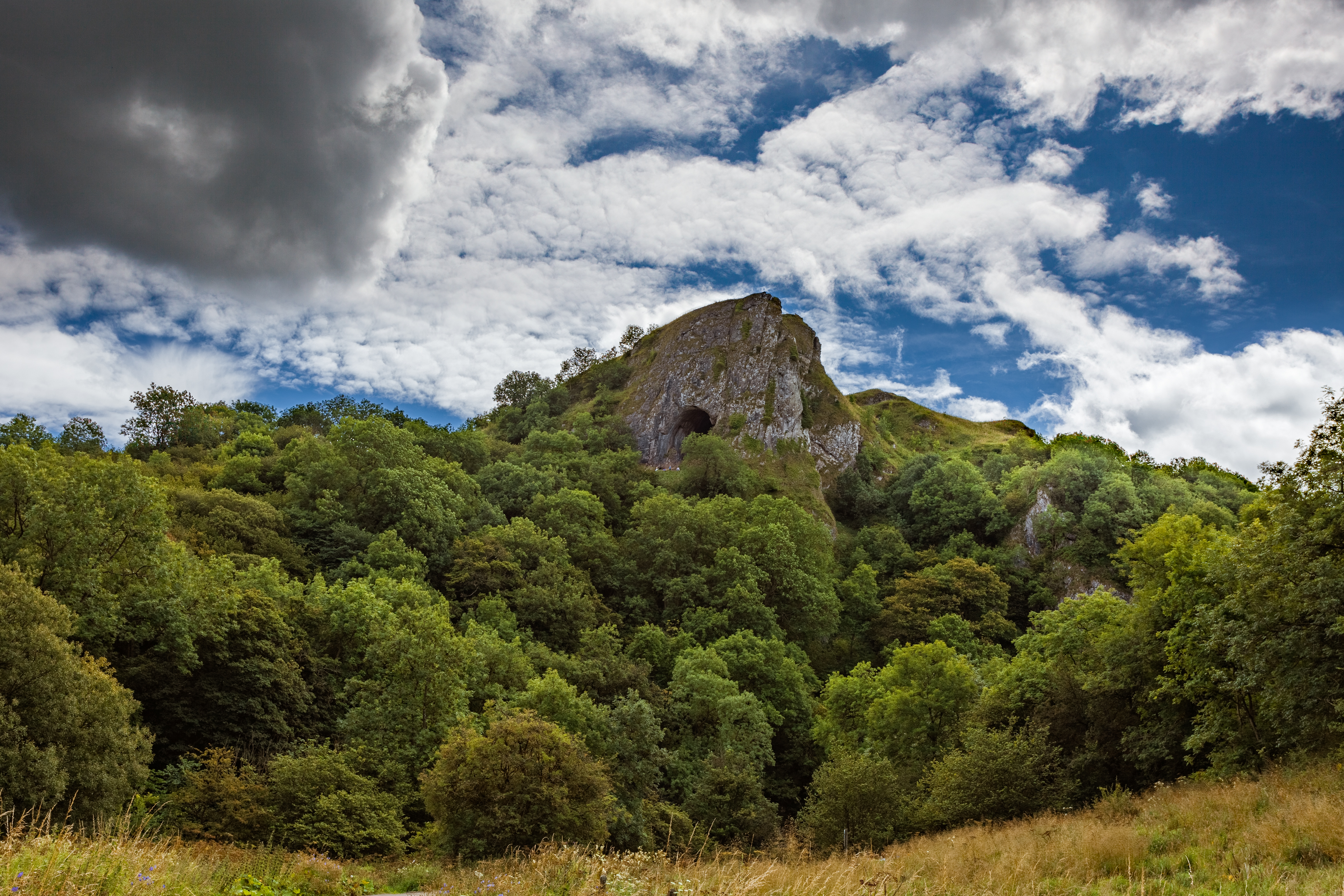
- Thor's Cave from the Manifold Way
- Interactive map of Thor's Cave
- Location: Manifold Valley, Staffordshire
- Length: 150 feet (46 m)
- Elevation: 870 feet (265 m)
- Geology: Limestone
- Entrances: 2
- Difficulty: Grade I (Note: Grade I: Easy caves. No pitches or other difficulties.)

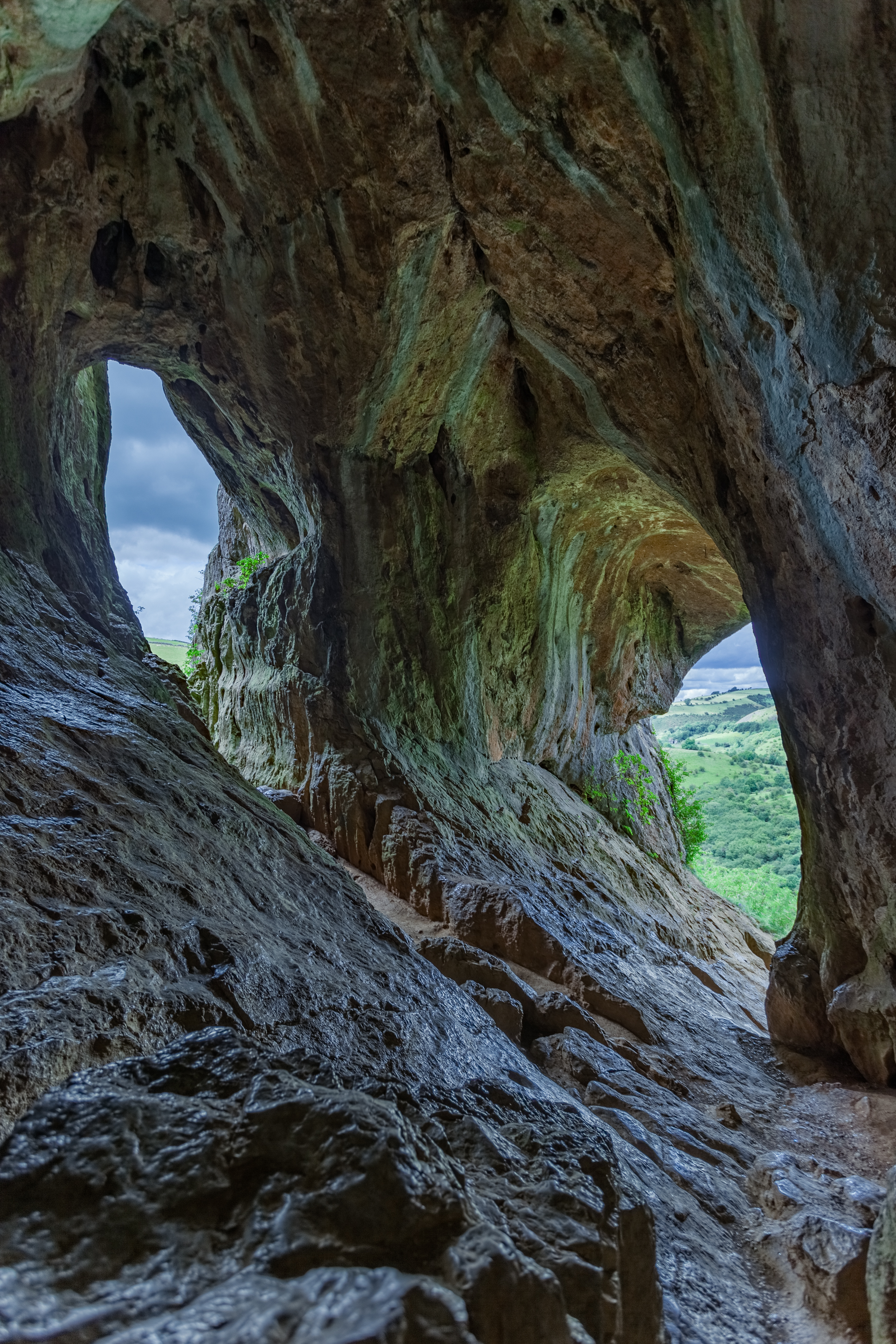
View from inside Thor's Cave

Thor's Cave (also known as Thor's House Cavern and Thyrsis's Cave) is a natural cavern at SK09865496 in the Manifold Valley of the White Peak in Staffordshire, England. It is classified as a karst cave. Located in a steep limestone crag, the cave entrance, a symmetrical arch 7.5 metres wide and 10 metres high, is prominently visible from the valley bottom, around 80 metres (260 feet) below. Reached by an easy stepped path from the Manifold Way or from Wetton village, the cave is a popular tourist spot, with views over the Manifold Valley. The second entrance is known as the "West Window", below which is a second cave, Thor's Fissure Cavern.

Thor's Cave was served by a railway station on the Leek and Manifold Valley Light Railway from 1904 to 1934; the disused line now forms the Manifold Way.

== Etymology ==
The origin of the name is uncertain, possibly from the word "tor". Links with the Norse god Thor and the Germanic paganism of the early Anglo-Saxons in general have been suggested, but evidence is lacking. Other hypotheses have included lost ancient dialectal terms, and obscure English saints.

== Human habitation ==
Excavations in 1864–65 and 1927–35 found human and animal remains, stone tools, pottery, amber beads, and bronze items within Thor's Cave and the adjacent Thor's Fissure Cavern. The caves are estimated to have contained the burial sites of at least seven people. The finds suggest the cavern was occupied from the end of the Palaeolithic period, with more intensive use during the Iron Age and Roman periods.

== Rock climbing ==
Thor's Cave has been used by rock climbers since explorations in the early 1950s by Joe Brown and others. Eleven limestone routes are listed by the BMC, ranging in grade from Very Severe to E7, and several more have been added since the publication of the BMC's rock climbing guidebook; a few routes are bolted sport climbing routes, such as Thormen's Moth 8a (5.13b) by Andy Pollitt in 1988.

== Media use ==
The cave was used to represent the entrance to the Dark Wizard's lair in the 1980 film Hawk the Slayer, directed by Terry Marcel, and was a location in The Lair of the White Worm (1988), directed by Ken Russell and starring Hugh Grant.

It was used in the filming of The Verve's 1993 video for their single "Blue", and is also pictured on the front cover of the band's first album, A Storm in Heaven. The cave also acts as the backdrop for Winterfylleth's band photo for their 2020 album The Reckoning Dawn.

== See also ==
- Beeston Tor
- Ecton
- Grindon
- Wetton
