= Forth (album) =

Studio album by the Verve
- Released: 25 August 2008
- Recorded: 2007–2008
- Studio: State of the Ark in Richmond, London
- Genres: Neo-psychedelia; alternative rock; dream pop
- Length: 64:18
- Labels: Parlophone, Megaforce, EMI
- Producers: Chris Potter, Tim Bran, the Verve

The Verve chronology
This Is Music: The Singles 92–98 (2004)	Forth (2008)

Singles from Forth
- 1. "Love Is Noise" Released: 11 August 2008; 2. "Rather Be" Released: 17 November 2008

Forth is the fourth and final studio album by English alternative rock band the Verve. It was released internationally on 25 August 2008 on EMI and a day later in North America on the On Your Own label. The band reformed in 2007, having broken up for the second time nearly a decade earlier, in 1999. Forth was their first new studio album since Urban Hymns (1997), and their first since A Northern Soul (1995) to feature the band's original line-up without second guitarist and keyboardist Simon Tong. It is also the second album to feature producer Chris Potter, who by this point also served as Ashcroft's solo album producer.

The album's first single, "Love Is Noise", received its first airplay on BBC Radio 1 on 23 June 2008. The song reached number 4 on the UK Singles Chart and became a summer hit in Europe. The band also released a non-album track, "Mover", as a free download a week later. Like The Verve's previous studio album Urban Hymns, Forth peaked on the UK Albums Chart at number one, and at number 23 on the US Billboard 200. Forth was certified gold by the British Phonographic Industry. The album sold about 21,000 copies in its first week of release in the US, and as of January 2009 has sold about 53,000 copies in the US. The band would break up again sometime after the album's release and the summer of 2009.

== Background ==
The band recorded new songs in Richmond between 2007 and 2008. Most of the backing tracks were done before touring the UK in November and December. Then, recording continued between February and the start of their summer dates in April and some final work was done after the mini US-tour done between April and May before their summer festival appearances in Europe and Japan. Jonathan Cohen of Billboard states that Forth is "[A] bracing blend of the experimentalism of the group's early work and the more structured songwriting of its last two efforts."

"Sit and Wonder" and "Love Is Noise" have been played live during the band's festival appearances, including the Coachella Valley Music and Arts Festival in April 2008; "Rather Be" also received select live airings throughout the summer, notably as part of the band's headlining set at the V Festival in August 2008. "I See Houses" was played live once, at the Eden Project in Cornwall in August 2008.

== Release and reception ==
Professional ratings
Aggregate scores
Source	Rating
Metacritic	71/100
Review scores
Source	Rating
AllMusic	3/5 stars
Drowned in Sound	5/10
The Guardian	3/5 stars
The Michigan Daily	3/5 stars
NME	8/10
Pitchfork	5.0/10
Q	3/5 stars
Rolling Stone	4/5 stars
Spin	4/5 stars
Uncut	4/5 stars

Forth received generally positive reviews from music critics. At Metacritic, which assigns a normalized rating out of 100 to reviews from mainstream critics, the album received an average score of 71, based on 28 reviews, indicating "generally favorable reviews".

Forth was named No. 47 in Q's "50 Best Albums of the Year" for 2008 and No.26 in NME's "Best Albums of 2008" list.

== Track listing ==
All songs written by the Verve, except where noted.

Standard version
No.	Title	Writer(s)	Length
1.	"Sit and Wonder"		6:52
2.	"Love Is Noise"	The Verve/Ashcroft	5:29
3.	"Rather Be"	Ashcroft	5:38
4.	"Judas"		6:18
5.	"Numbness"		6:34
6.	"I See Houses"	Ashcroft	5:37
7.	"Noise Epic"		8:13
8.	"Valium Skies"	Ashcroft	4:34
9.	"Columbo"		7:30
10.	"Appalachian Springs"	Ashcroft	7:33
Total length:			64:18

LP and Japanese version bonus tracks
No.	Title	Length
10.	"Ma Ma Soul"	5:42
11.	"Muhammad Ali"	6:20
Total length:		76:04

Notes

- Due to the addition of two tracks before "Appalachian Springs" on the LP and Japanese versions, the song "Appalachian Springs" becomes track 12.

== Digital downloads ==
- "The Thaw Session" - 14:09 ( It was released exclusively as a free download by the band through the NME website on 22 October 2007)
- "Mover" - 3:55 (2008 Version / It was available at www.theverve.tv for one week only)
- "Let the Damage Begin" – 4:09 (Amazon.com exclusive bonus track – live version from 2007 originally released as a B-side to "Love Is Noise")

== B-sides ==
- "Chic Dub" - 6:12 ("Love Is Noise" B-side)
- "Major Force" - 5:53 (Rather Be 7" Vinyl #1)
- "All Night Long" - 7:26 (Rather Be - 7" Vinyl #2)

== Unofficially released songs ==
- "Blue Pacific Ocean" - 6:20 (Leaked the 18-05-08)
- "Mona Lisa" - 3:59 (It was going to be included in the album and was also proposed as the first single, according to Nick McCabe) [Richard Ashcroft]
- "Ain't The Future A Trip" ?:?? (This song was temporarily leaked on a forum of fans)

=== Special edition DVD ===
- Space & Time: The Verve Documentary
- The Verve: Live at Coachella, April 2008
  1. "Sonnet"
  2. "This Is Music"
  3. "The Rolling People"
  4. "Lucky Man"
  5. "Love Is Noise"

== Personnel ==
The Verve

- Richard Ashcroft – vocals, acoustic guitars, keyboards
- Nick McCabe – lead guitar, keyboards, vibraphone, autoharp
- Simon Jones – bass guitar
- Peter Salisbury – drums, percussion

Additional personnel

- Davide Rossi – string arrangements, violins (tracks 1, 2, 3, 4, 6 and 8)
- The Verve – producer
- Cameron Jenkins – mixing, recording
- Chris Potter – producer, mixing, recording (tracks 1, 2, 3, 5, 6, 8 and 10)
- Tim Bran – producer, mixing (tracks 3, 4, 5, 6, 7, 9 and 10)
- Jazz Summers and Tim Parry for The Big Life Music Company – management
- Dean Chalkley – portrait photography
- Studio Fury – design & art direction

== Charts ==
=== Weekly charts ===
Weekly chart performance for Forth
Chart (2008)	Peak position
Australian Albums (ARIA)	20
Austrian Albums (Ö3 Austria)	11
Belgian Albums (Ultratop Flanders)	8
Belgian Albums (Ultratop Wallonia)	20
Canadian Albums (Billboard)	12
Danish Albums (Hitlisten)	22
Dutch Albums (Album Top 100)	16
Finnish Albums (Suomen virallinen lista)	30
French Albums (SNEP)	31
German Albums (Offizielle Top 100)	10
Irish Albums (IRMA)	2
Italian Albums (FIMI)	4
Japanese Albums (Oricon)	10
New Zealand Albums (RMNZ)	10
Norwegian Albums (VG-lista)	38
Polish Albums (ZPAV)	32
Portuguese Albums (AFP)	20
Spanish Albums (Promusicae)	44
Swedish Albums (Sverigetopplistan)	34
Swiss Albums (Schweizer Hitparade)	6
UK Albums (Official Charts)	1
US Billboard 200	23
US Independent Albums (Billboard)	1

=== Year-end charts ===
Year-end chart performance for Forth
Chart (2008)	Position
UK Albums (OCC)	63

== Certifications ==
Region	Certification	Certified units/sales
Ireland (IRMA)	Gold	7,500^{^}
United Kingdom (BPI)	Platinum	300,000^{‡}
^{^} Shipments figures based on certification alone.^{‡} Sales+streaming figures based on certification alone.

== Release history ==
Release history and formats for Forth
Country	Date	Label	Format	Catalog number
Germany	22 August 2008	EMI	CD Link	
United Kingdom	25 August 2008	Parlophone	CD	
United Kingdom	25 August 2008	Parlophone	CD with bonus DVD	
United Kingdom	25 August 2008	Parlophone	Double LP with bonus tracks	5099923558410
United Kingdom	25 August 2008	Parlophone	Luxury box set containing Double LP with bonus tracks, CD and bonus DVD	
North America	26 August 2008	On Your Own	CD	VER01 / 0 20286 12522 8
Japan	3 September 2008	EMI Music Japan	CD with 2 bonus tracks ("Muhammad Ali" and "Ma Ma Soul")	TOCP-66825
Japan	3 September 2008	EMI Music Japan	CD with 2 bonus tracks and bonus DVD	TOCP-66824
