= Slide Away =

Slide Away may refer to:

- "Slide Away" (Oasis song), a 1994 song by English rock band Oasis
- "Slide Away" (The Verve song), a 1993 song by British rock band The Verve
- "Slide Away" (Miley Cyrus song), a 2019 song by American singer Miley Cyrus
