= Rather Be (The Verve song) =

Single by The Verve

from the album Forth
- B-side: "Major Force"; "All Night Long"
- Released: 17 November 2008
- Genre: Britpop; alternative rock
- Length: 4:01 (radio edit); 5:38 (album version)
- Label: Parlophone
- Songwriter(s): Richard Ashcroft
- Producer(s): Chris Potter; The Verve

The Verve singles chronology
"Love Is Noise" (2008)	"Rather Be" (2008)

"Rather Be" is a song by the English alternative rock band The Verve. It is the third track on their fourth studio album, Forth. The song was released on 17 November 2008, the second single from the album, following the summer hit "Love Is Noise". Richard Ashcroft is credited as the sole composer of the track although, according to band members, the song changed a lot since the initial version brought over by Ashcroft with his companions' aid.

This was also the band's final single following their third disbandment a year later.

== Background ==
According to the band, the song was written by Ashcroft just a few months before they re-formed in mid-2007. Different approaches for it were considered. According to Nick McCabe, a "psychedelic version" of the song was his personal favorite.

As for the interpretation of the song's meaning, Ashcroft explained it in an interview with Steve Lamacq, saying, "Lyrically in a way it's kind of we're bombarded with so much information now. There's too much. You know, there's a point where you have to just switch off, because I don't believe we are sort of wired to be able to take in so much information, we become even numb to it or it makes us very, very fearful of the world outside the door when you've got the rolling news going, you've got all this death and destruction and yet on the other hand, even what it's saying is I'd rather be here, you know, it's, I've said it before, 'We’re on a rock in infinity. We're on this planet, man.' It's just, isn't that the miracle? Is this the miracle, the miracle?’ Is waking up and looking out? It's very difficult, I think, in the modern age to find time to, or space, to really invest a bit of thought into the fact that you are on a planet in infinity."

The band recorded both B-sides for the single in late September 2008, a month after the album's release.

== Chart performance ==
"Rather Be" debuted and peaked at number 56 on the UK Singles Chart.

== Music video ==
The music video was filmed at May Hill in Gloucestershire. Ashcroft directed the video and is the only member seen on the clip. The video shows him singing while walking through a grove.

== Track listings ==
The band released on its online store an exclusive live version of the song on 16 November. A day later, both vinyl editions and the CD-single and digital bundle were available.

UK promo CD

1. "Rather Be" (Radio Edit) - 4:01
2. "Rather Be" (Album Version) - 5:38

Digital Bundle

1. "Rather Be" (Edit) - 4:01
2. "All Night Long" - 7:26
3. "Major Force" - 5:52
4. "Love Is Noise" (Tom Middleton Remix) - 7:23

CD

1. "Rather Be" (radio edit) - 4:01
2. "Love Is Noise" (Tom Middleton remix) - 7:23

7" gatefold

1. "Rather Be" (radio edit) - 4:01
2. "Major Force" - 5:52

7" clear vinyl

1. "Rather Be" (radio edit) - 4:01
2. "All Night Long" - 7:26

Exclusive download from Verve official online store

1. "Rather Be" (Live at Rock A Field Festival, Luxembourg - 21 June 2008) - 6:13

Exclusive Download from iTunes Store

1. "Rather Be" (Caned & Able remix) - 5:32

== Charts ==
Chart (2008)	Peak position
UK Singles Chart	56

== In other media ==
"Rather Be" is used in the 2008 film Marley & Me, along with "Lucky Man".
