= Low line =

Low line or lowline may refer to:

- Lowline (band), English indie band
- Lowline (park), proposed underground park in New York
- Lowline cattle, Australian cattle breed
- Low line, another term for an underscore
