= Black Submarine =

Alternative rock band

- Origin: England
- Genres: Experimental rock, space rock
- Years active: 2008–2017
- Labels: AWAL
- Past members: Nick McCabe; Simon Jones; Davide Rossi; Michele "Mig" Schillace; Amelia Tucker
- Website: https://blacksubmarine.co.uk/

Black Submarine, previously known as The Black Ships until mid-2012, were an English rock supergroup formed in November 2008 by former Verve members Nick McCabe and Simon Jones, Coldplay/Goldfrapp collaborator and former The Verve touring musician Davide Rossi, singer Amelia Tucker and drummer Mig Schillace.

== Formation and Kurofune (2008–2011) ==
Electric violinist Davide Rossi, who also featured on The Verve's 2008 reunion album Forth, shared the stage with the band at festivals including V Festival and Glastonbury Festival. Drummer Mig Schillace, was a collaborator of McCabe in previous musical incarnations such as 'Field Theory'. The band started rehearsing in Copenhagen before deciding on the band name in March/April 2009 and released their debut EP Kurofune in late May 2011.

The band also made their live debut in June 2011 at King's College Students Union in London, featuring a host of different vocalists including Amelia Tucker, David McKellar and Charley Bickers. The band contributed a version of Rope Soul'd to the John Martyn tribute album "Johnny Boy Would Love This: A Tribute To John Martyn" released in August 2011.

== New Shores (2012–2017) ==
The band started recording new materials in Denmark and the United Kingdom in 2012. Vocalist Amelia Tucker joined the band to contribute a version of "Renee" to the Talk Talk tribute album Spirit of Talk Talk, released in September 2012. Tucker joined the band on a permanent basis and contributed vocals and lyrics to new songs the band recorded through 2013. As a five-piece, the band contributed the tracks "See Through You," "Sunset Red Light," "Living in this City," and "Give Us Back" to the soundtrack for the 2013 Indonesian action film Java Heat, starring Mickey Rourke and Kellan Lutz.

In January 2014, the track "Here So Rain" was released as a lead single for the band's debut album on YouTube and SoundCloud. On 10 March 2014, the band released New Shores. The album's release was supported by a PledgeMusic campaign where fans and supporters could pre-order signed copies of the album, t-shirts, and other accessories. Prior to the release of New Shores, the band announced they would be supporting Echo & the Bunnymen on a live tour across the United Kingdom in May 2014.

The band split in 2017. And in November 2019, McCabe and Tucker released two songs on Bandcamp under the name Litter and Leaves.

== Name ==
In April 2012 the band changed their name to Black Submarine following a dispute with a self-published American electronic duo that trademarked the name Black Ships in April 2011.

== Band members ==
- Nick McCabe – guitar, electronics
- Simon Jones – bass
- Davide Rossi – violin, vocals, arrangements
- Michele "Mig" Schillace – drums, percussion
- Amelia Tucker – vocals, arrangements
