= Lowline (band) =

English rock band

Lowline are an indie band from Manchester, England.

== History ==
Lowline formed in their home town of Manchester in late 2007 releasing their first single "Monitors" through 1234 Records early 2008 with producer Owen Morris. Both "Monitors" and the follow-up single "Sound Of Music" (also produced by Morris) reached number 6 in the UK Indie charts.

The band formed after a chance meeting at a fall show. With a similar predilection for Krautrock and post-punk including The Chameleons, The Clash and Echo and The Bunnymen, the band soon won a reputation as ‘the black sheep’ of the Manchester music scene – eschewing traditional venues preferring to set up their own shows in semi-derelict warehouses in Salford and Ancoats. Lowline soon counted Morris as well as Mani and Nick McCabe among their supporters.

With two Morris-produced, self-released singles selling out by word of mouth, subsequent airplay by Radio One’s Zane Lowe and Huw Stephens, as well as playlists on XFM and 6Music, tours with The Enemy, The Happy Mondays and The Charlatans followed as did a burgeoning interest from record labels. Left contemplating the band’s future, the members collectively decided to leave the UK for a hectic touring schedule of Europe, the proceeds of which were used to finance recording themselves and on their own terms.

The band toured extensively across Europe and the UK before returning to Manchester to start their Deaf Radio label facilitating their own album release.

The band released their debut album Lowline in 2011 through their own label Deaf Radio. The album was recorded in Stockport and was produced by George Shilling. The album consists of 12 tracks and 2 bonus tracks-including a Jagz Kooner remix of opening track "Disko Killers".

Their track "Outside" taken from the album was made "Single of the Week" on iTunes in The United States helping the album climb to number 20 in iTunes USA Alternative chart and maintain a position in the top 30 for over a week. All this culminating in the band being named "iTunes USA Alternative Breakthrough Artist of the Year" for 2011.

== Releases ==
=== Singles ===
- "Monitors" (1234 Records 2008)
- "Last Chance" (1234 Records 2008) B-Side
- "Sound Of Music" (1234 Records 2008)
- "Wait For Them to Run" (1234 Records 2008) B-Side
- "Gun In My Side" (1234 Records 2009)
- "Gun In My Side" (Joe & Will Ask? Remix) (1234 Records 2008) B-Side

=== Lowline (Album, 2011) ===
1. Disko Killers
2. Monitors
3. All your Scars
4. Here I Lie
5. Blinded
6. Outside
7. Gun In My Side
8. Lost Touch
9. Army Of Youth
10. Black Eye
11. Sound Of Music
12. Wait For Them To Run

Bonus tracks

1. Suicide
2. Disko Killers (Jagz Kooner Remix)

=== The Howler (EP, 2013) ===
1. The Howler
2. Sally Sledgehammer
3. My Head Explodes
4. Bury My Soul (feat. Nick McCabe)
5. Last One Standing

== Reviews ==
- “More Manchester greats” –NME
- “Another Manchester success story and their latest stars” –The Sun
- "Arguably the most exciting new band to have emerged from Manchester in recent times." –The Guardian

== Lineup ==
- Robbie Rush (Guitar/Vocals)
- Andy Hewitt (Guitar/Backing Vocals)
- Mikey Hosker (Bass)
- Sam Clarke (Drums)
