= Northern Star Records =

British record label

Northern Star Records was a UK based record label, founded by Scott Causer and Andy Oliver in 2005. The label launched in March 2006 with their first release, the double CD compilation album, Psychedelica Vol. 1. The release soon gained cult status and was praised by Billboard for bringing the genre into the mainstream, as the label was increasing viewed as being the leading pioneers of the third wave of psychedelia. In February 2008, Andy Oliver left to pursue his own interests which left Scott Causer to take the label forward.

Psychedelica Vol: 1 featured The Electric Prunes, The Brian Jonestown Massacre, Silver Apples, The Fuzztones and The Telescopes, and introduced The Black Angels, The Dolly Rocker Movement, The Lovetones, The Stevenson Ranch Davidians and The Electric Mainline. The series went on to 5 volumes and the label became known for their infamous Northern Star Weekenders, one of which resulted in the 2014 Live album 'Live Revolution.'

Bands who signed to Northern Star Records include The Nova Saints, Youngteam, The Lost Rivers, The Electric Mainline, The Early Morning Satellites and The Carousels.

Northern Star announced its closure shortly after the 10 Years of Psychedelica Show at the Brixton Windmill in 2016 headlined by Youngteam and featuring performances from Soundwire, Culkin, 93MillionMilesFromTheSun, Kontakte, Satsangi and the debut show from The Cult of Free Love.
