= Peter Salisbury =

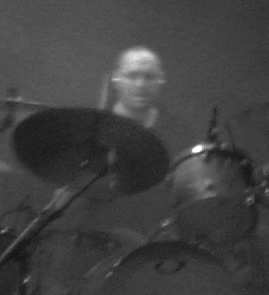
- On stage with The Verve in Madrid, 2008.

Background information
- Born: Peter Anthony Sailsbury; 24 September 1971 (age 54); Chippenham, Wiltshire, England
- Genres: Britpop; alternative rock; shoegazing; indie rock
- Instrument: Drums
- Years active: 1990–present
- Labels: Hut, Virgin

Peter Anthony Salisbury (born 24 September 1971) is an English rock drummer, best known as the drummer for The Verve, whom he co-founded in 1990.

== The Verve ==
The Verve broke up in 1999 and reunited in June 2007 for a new tour and a future album. Salisbury is believed to have been the one behind getting the ball rolling in terms of reuniting the band. After Ashcroft learned that Salisbury was in contact with the former guitarist, Nick McCabe, over a possible side project, Ashcroft used this as an excuse to call McCabe. Ashcroft made peace with him and bassist Simon Jones and the band reformed. In a band interview with the NME in 2007, Salisbury said that the problems between them were not that bad in the first place.

== Other musical projects ==
After the band's second demise in 1999, Salisbury played with various bands including Black Rebel Motorcycle Club. He filled in on a UK/EU tour in 2002, when their original drummer Nick Jago could not get a working visa for BRMC's British gigs. Salisbury owned and ran a drum shop, "Drummin", in Stockport, England. He played drums on the first three of Richard Ashcroft's solo albums.

Following the Verve's third demise in 2008, in October 2010, Salisbury played drums on The Charlatans UK tour, while their regular drummer Jon Brookes was undergoing treatment for a brain tumour. Brookes died in 2013, and Salisbury has continued to work as The Charlatans drummer since then, though he has not been made a full member of the band.

In 2022 Salisbury collaborated with former Verve guitarist Nick McCabe on an EP entitled "Home Is Where The Heart Is", available on Bandcamp.

== Discography ==
- Richard Ashcroft - "Alone With Everybody"(2000)
- Richard Ashcroft - "Human Conditions"(2002)
- Richard Ashcroft - "Keys to the World"(2006)
- The Charlatans - "Modern Nature"(2015)
- The Charlatans - "Different Days"(2017)
- The Charlatans - "We Are Love"(2025)
