= Simon Jones (musician) =

English bassist

- Born: Simon Robin David Jones; 29 July 1972 (age 53); Liverpool, England
- Genres: Alternative rock, Britpop, psychedelic rock, shoegaze
- Occupation: Bassist
- Years active: 1989–present
- Labels: Hut, Virgin

Simon Robin David Jones (born 29 July 1972) is an English bass guitarist. He played bass and provided occasional backing vocals for the rock band The Verve.

== The Verve ==
Away from the musical side of The Verve, Jones is the only other band member other than the band's main mouthpiece, lead singer Richard Ashcroft, who tends to speak publicly and in interviews. Most notably, he, along with Ashcroft, made a speech at the 2007 Q Awards as they won a classic album award for their 1997 album Urban Hymns. He thanked the band members’ wives and children and also thanked former Verve guitarist Simon Tong, who was not included in the newly reformed Verve line up. He also did an interview on Zane Lowe's BBC Radio 1 show after the band's 2007 reformation, and he also appeared alone and alongside Ashcroft in a handful of Verve documentaries and other miscellaneous interviews throughout the 1990s.

When The Verve split in 1999 due to in-band tensions, many believed they were down to tensions between singer Richard Ashcroft and lead guitarist Nick McCabe. While this is true, there were in fact problems, described as 'serious' by Ashcroft in later interviews, between Ashcroft and Jones also.

In June 2007, he rejoined The Verve in their reunion but by 2009 they had disbanded again.

== Other musical projects ==
After the breakup of The Verve in 1999, Jones later played bass and wrote songs for the short lived band The Shining, who former Verve bandmate Simon Tong also played with. They would release just one album in 2002 called True Skies.

In 2003, Jones was the recording bassist for Howie Day on Day's second album, Stop All The World Now, on Epic Records.

In 2004 Jones was an official member of the backing band for Cathy Davey.

In November 2005, he performed with the Gorillaz live band playing guitar at the Manchester Opera House, as part of the Manchester International Festival, again alongside fellow Verve member Simon Tong.

In 2009 Jones founded a new band called The Black Ships with McCabe, drummer Mig Schillace, and electric violinist Davide Rossi. The Black Ships released their first EP, "Kurofune", in May 2011, and performed their debut gig at Kings College Student Union on 2 June 2011 before changing their name to Black Submarine in mid-2012.

In 2015, Jones featured on the "Out of the Hive" EP by Scottish band, Boletes.

== Personal life ==
Jones attended Rudston Road primary school in Childwall, Liverpool and moved to Wigan when he was 13 years old. He is married to Myra and has two sons, Jude and Jonah.

Since 2010 Jones has owned and managed Faktory Studios, situated in Great Barrow, Cheshire. In 2020 he recorded and engineered "Golden Repair", the fourth album by Liverpool-based band Sunstack Jones, whose previous self-titled album had been mastered by Nick McCabe.
