= Nick McCabe =

English musician

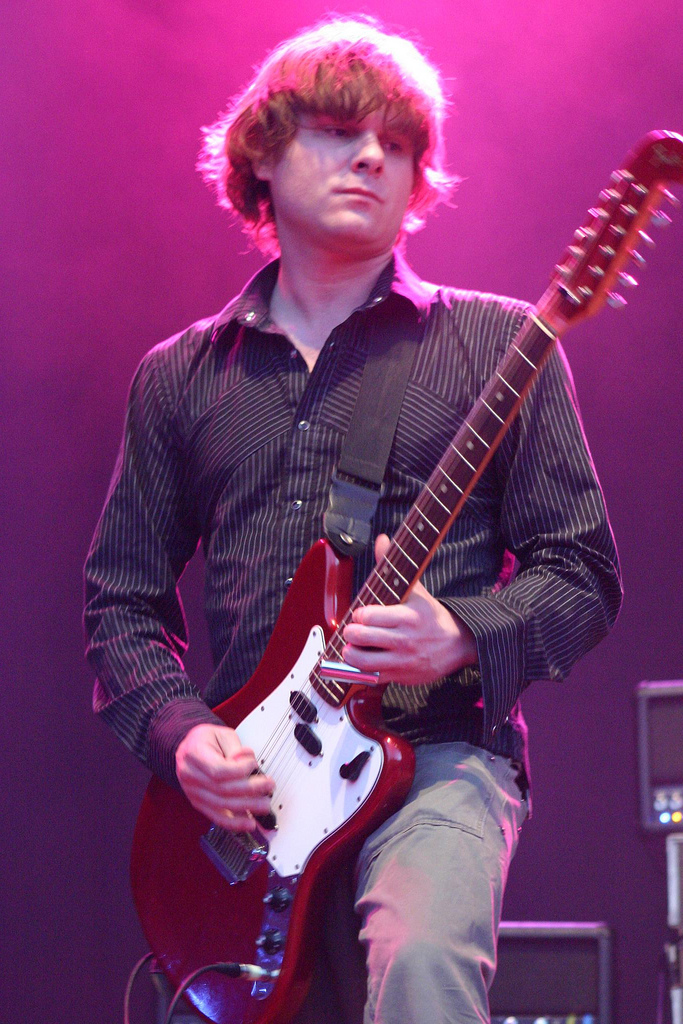
- McCabe in 2008

Background information
- Born: Nicholas John McCabe; Haydock, Lancashire, England
- Genres: Alternative rock, psychedelic rock, shoegaze, ambient
- Instruments: Guitar, bass, keyboards, accordion, autoharp, piano
- Years active: 1989–present

Nicholas John McCabe is an English musician, best known as being the lead guitarist of the rock group the Verve.

== Early life ==
McCabe is the son of a bus driver father and a social worker mother and has two older brothers, Alan and Paul. He grew up in Haydock. His earliest musical influences were Northern Soul, metal, Pink Floyd and punk records borrowed from his brothers. McCabe bought a Roland synthesizer and began purchasing his own music with money he made working at a farm.

When asked what it was that inspired him to become a guitarist, he answered: "That was me, I just got a guitar, and I could play a few things on it, and I liked messing with it, and I liked making my own things up." He attended Haydock High School, and later met Richard Ashcroft at Winstanley College. Ashcroft described McCabe's guitar playing as sounding like "a whole other universe"; the two briefly played in a band whilst at college. After leaving college, McCabe began a career as a quantity surveyor. He later recalled: "I hated it. I used to sit there all day scribbling in my pad thinking about guitar sounds." He gave this up to be part of the Verve along with Ashcroft, Simon Jones and Peter Salisbury. During the early days of the band McCabe suffered from impostor syndrome and was discouraged from pursuing a career in music by many people in his social circle.

== The Verve ==
McCabe was generally an aloof member, being involved in relatively few interviews. Tensions and power struggles between McCabe and Ashcroft would later cause the band's dissolution. The first break-up happened in 1995 when Ashcroft left after the band's second album, A Northern Soul. Shortly thereafter Ashcroft reformed the band without McCabe, replacing him with Simon Tong. McCabe returned home to work on his own music and spend time with his daughter until Ashcroft asked him to return in 1997, for the band's third album, Urban Hymns. Despite the album's success, McCabe left in 1998, and although the Verve continued touring without him, the band later split for the second time in early 1999.

In early 2007, McCabe made peace with Ashcroft, and the band reunited. A new album, Forth, was released in 2008. However, the band broke up again in 2009.

== Other projects ==
Following The Verve's split in 1999, McCabe kept a relatively low profile. In 2001, he played on "Walking Home" for John Martyn's album On the Cobbles. In 2002, he played on "Lost Broadcast" for Faultline's album Your Love Means Everything. In 2004, McCabe's remix of The Music's song "The People" appeared on their single "Freedom Fighters". In March 2009, following the death of Martyn, McCabe discussed Martyn's music and the experience of working with him in an interview with Mojo.

In 2009 McCabe founded a new band called The Black Ships with Jones, drummer Mig Schillace, and electric violinist Davide Rossi. The Black Ships released their first EP, "Kurofune", in May 2011, and performed their debut gig at Kings College Student Union on 2 June 2011 before changing their name to Black Submarine in mid-2012.

In November 2019 McCabe began releasing solo work to Bandcamp, initially as a side project called Litter and Leaves with Black Submarine member Amelia Tucker and then under his own name. In June 2022 he released the EP "Home Is Where the Heart Is", a collaboration with Verve drummer Peter Salisbury and featuring Tucker. McCabe has also written a significant amount of electronic music over the years which remains unreleased.

== Musical style ==
McCabe stands still while playing, with one reviewer in 1993 describing him as having "coaxed gorgeous, shimmering wodges of sound from his instrument while exuding all the enthusiasm of a man waiting for a bus."

McCabe has cited artists such as Joy Division, John Martyn, Vini Reilly and Eddie Hazel as inspirations. In the early 1990s McCabe became fond of Detroit techno and Autechre, which along with other electronic music came to influence his style of guitar playing. He has also expressed his fondness of synthesizers and explained his 'psychedelic' sound as trying to make a guitar sound like a synthesizer by using effects pedals and valve amps.

Producer Owen Morris referred to McCabe as "without a shadow of a doubt the most gifted musician I've ever worked with", but also claimed he was "a complete and utter nightmare" to work with, saying "He'll never play the same thing twice. Now you can ask Noel Gallagher to play the same guitar line a hundred times, and as long as there's a good reason for him doing it, he'll do it. But with Nick you've got no chance. But that's what he does, y'know?"

== Discography ==
- The Beta Band – Champion Versions E.P. (1997)
- Mellow – Instant Love E.P. (1999)
- O.S.T. for Iain Banks' "Complicity" (2000)
- Neotropic (project) – La Prochaine Fois/An Ambient Road Movie (2001)
- Faultline feat. Nick McCabe – "Lost Broadcast" (2002/2004, released on Your Love Means Everything)
- John Martyn feat. Nick McCabe – "Walking Home" (2004, released on On the Cobbles)
- Nick McCabe vs. The Music – "The People" (2004, released on The Freedom Fighters E.P.)
- The Nova Saints – "Far Out" (Nick McCabe Remix) (2007, released on The Draft EP)
- The Twilight Singers feat. Mark Lanegan and Nick McCabe – "Be Invited" (2011, released on Dynamite Steps)
- Intastella feat. Jah Wobble and Nick McCabe – "Lemons" (2011, released on The Rise and Fall of a Northern Dubstar)
- Lowline feat. Nick McCabe – "Bury My Soul" (2013, released on The Howler EP)
- Natalie Kocab and Michaela Poláková feat. Nick McCabe – on eight songs (2017, Ellis Island)
