= The Verve discography =

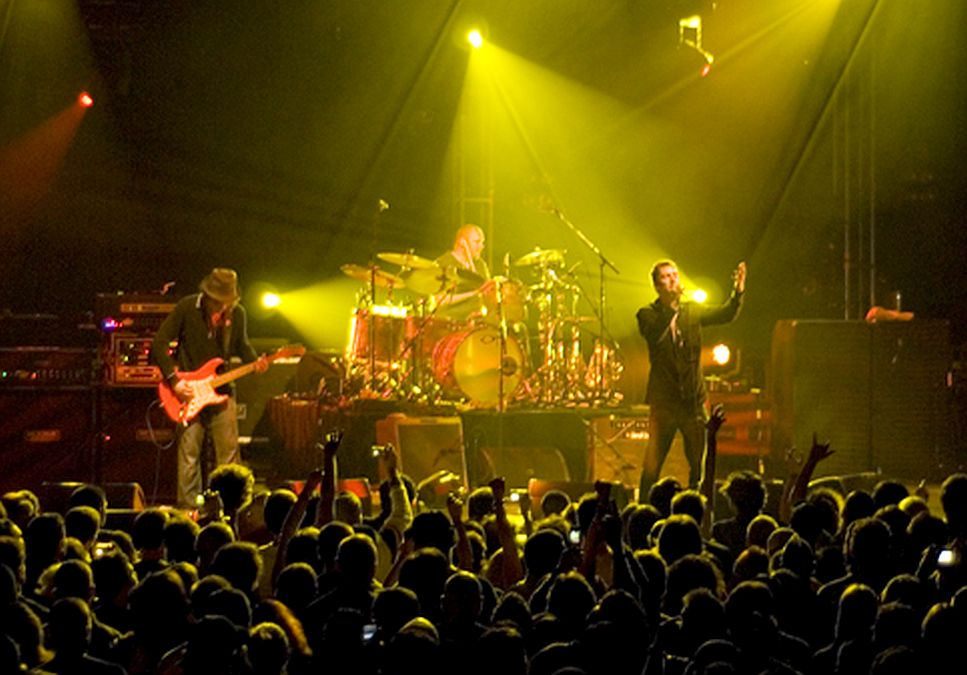
- The Verve performing at Madison Square Garden, New York City in 2008
- Studio albums: 4
- Extended plays: 3
- Compilation albums: 2
- Singles: 14
- Video albums: 2
- Music videos: 15
- Promotional singles: 2

British rock band the Verve have released four studio albums, two compilation albums, two video albums, three extended plays, 14 singles, two promotional singles and 15 music videos.

== Albums ==
=== Studio albums ===
List of studio albums, with selected chart positions, sales figures and certifications
Title	Details	Peak chart positions										Sales	Certifications
Title	Details	UK	AUS	BEL (FL)	CAN	FRA	GER	NZ	SWE	SWI	US	Sales	Certifications
A Storm in Heaven	Released: 21 June 1993 (UK); Labels: Vernon Yard, Hut, Virgin; Formats: CD, cassette, LP	27	184	—	—	—	—	—	—	—	—		BPI: Gold
A Northern Soul	Released: 1 July 1995 (UK); Labels: Vernon Yard, Hut, Virgin; Formats: CD, cassette, LP	13	—	—	—	—	—	—	—	—	—		BPI: Gold
Urban Hymns	Released: 29 September 1997 (UK); Labels: Hut, Virgin; Formats: CD, cassette, LP, MiniDisc	1	9	11	18	9	11	1	1	13	23	UK: 3,315,950 (Note: Sales as of September 2017); US: 1,358,000 (Note: Sales as of January 2009)	BPI: 11× Platinum; ARIA: 3× Platinum; BRMA: Platinum; BVMI: Platinum; IFPI SWE: Platinum; IFPI SWI: Platinum; MC: 2× Platinum; RIAA: Platinum; RMNZ: Platinum; SNEP: Platinum
Forth	Released: 25 August 2008 (UK); Label: Parlophone; Formats: CD, LP, digital download	1	20	8	12	31	10	10	34	6	23	US: 53,000 (Note: Sales as of January 2009)	BPI: Platinum
"—" denotes a recording that did not chart or was not released in that territory.

=== Compilation albums ===
List of compilation albums, with selected chart positions and certifications
Title	Details	Peak chart positions				Certifications
Title	Details	UK	AUS	AUT	IRL	Certifications
No Come Down	Released: 16 May 1994 (UK); Labels: Vernon Yard, Hut; Formats: CD, LP	—	—	—	—	
This Is Music: The Singles 92–98	Released: 1 November 2004 (UK); Labels: EMI, Virgin; Formats: CD, LP, digital download	15	133	59	28	BPI: Platinum; IRMA: Gold
"—" denotes a recording that did not chart or was not released in that territory.

=== Video albums ===
List of video albums
Title	Details
The Video 96–98	Released: 24 August 1999 (US); Label: Virgin; Formats: CD, VHS
This Is Music: The Singles 92–98	Released: 1 November 2004 (UK); Labels: EMI, Virgin; Formats: DVD

== Extended plays ==
List of extended plays
Title	Details
The Verve E.P.	Released: 7 December 1992; Label: Hut; Formats: CD, LP
Voyager 1	Released: 1 March 1993 (UK); Label: Jolly Roger; Formats: CD, LP
Five by Five	Released: 1997 (US); Label: Hut; Formats: CD, LP

== Singles ==
List of singles, with selected chart positions and certifications, showing year released and album name
Title	Year	Peak chart positions										Certifications	Album
Title	Year	UK	AUS	BEL (FL)	FIN	FRA	GER	NZ	SWE	SWI	US	Certifications	Album
"All in the Mind"	1992	80	—	—	—	—	—	—	—	—	—		Non-album single
"She's a Superstar"	1992	66	—	—	—	—	—	—	—	—	—		The Verve EP
"Gravity Grave"	1992	78	—	—	—	—	—	—	—	—	—		The Verve EP
"Blue"	1993	69	—	—	—	—	—	—	—	—	—		A Storm in Heaven
"Slide Away"	1993	90	—	—	—	—	—	—	—	—	—		A Storm in Heaven
"This Is Music"	1995	35	—	—	—	—	—	—	—	—	—		A Northern Soul
"On Your Own"	1995	28	—	—	—	—	—	—	—	—	—		A Northern Soul
"History"	1995	24	—	—	—	—	—	—	—	—	—		A Northern Soul
"Bitter Sweet Symphony"	1997	2	11	21	6	16	37	15	10	15	12	BPI: 5× Platinum; ARIA: Gold; BVMI: Platinum; RIAA: Gold; RMNZ: 5× Platinum; SNEP: Gold	Urban Hymns
"The Drugs Don't Work"	1997	1	22	52	9	72	87	10	18	—	—	BPI: 2× Platinum; RMNZ: Gold	Urban Hymns
"Lucky Man"	1997	7	60	67	16	88	89	38	—	—	—	BPI: 2× Platinum; RMNZ: Platinum	Urban Hymns
"Sonnet"	1998	74	83	—	—	—	—	43	—	—	—	BPI: Platinum; RMNZ: Gold	Urban Hymns
"Love Is Noise"	2008	4	51	26	—	—	26	35	10	26	—	BPI: Gold	Forth
"Rather Be"	2008	56	—	—	—	—	—	—	—	—	—		Forth
"—" denotes a recording that did not chart or was not released in that territory.

=== Promotional singles ===
List of promotional singles, showing year released and album name
Title	Year	Album
"The Rolling People"	1998	Urban Hymns
"The Thaw Session"	2007	Non-album single

== Music videos ==
List of music videos, with directors, showing year released
Title	Year	Director(s)
"All in the Mind"	1992	Miles Aldridge
"She's a Superstar"	1992	Richie Smyth
"Gravity Grave"	1992	Richie Smyth
"Blue"	1993	Richie Smyth
"Slide Away"	1993	Richie Smyth
"This Is Music"	1995	Nico Beyer
"On Your Own"	1995	Jake Scott
"History"	1995	Richard Ashcroft
"Bitter Sweet Symphony"	1997	Walter A. Stern
"The Drugs Don't Work"	1997	Andy Baybutt, George Hanson
"Lucky Man" (version 1)	1997	Andy Baybutt, George Hanson
"Lucky Man" (version 2)	1997	Jamie Thraves
"Sonnet"	1998	Chris Palmer
"Love Is Noise"	2008	Sam Brown
"Rather Be"	2008	Richard Ashcroft
