= All in the Mind (song) =

1992 debut single by the Verve

Single by Verve
- B-side: "One Way to Go"; "Man Called Sun"
- Released: 9 March 1992
- Studio: Impact, Canterbury, Kent, England
- Length: 4:16
- Label: Hut
- Songwriter(s): Nick McCabe; Richard Ashcroft; Simon Jones; Peter Salisbury
- Producer(s): Paul Schroeder

Verve singles chronology
"All in the Mind" (1992)	"She's a Superstar" (1992)

"All in the Mind" is a song by the English rock band Verve. It was released as the band's debut single on 9 March 1992. They had formed while at college in Wigan, making their live debut in August 1990. With the addition of manager Dave Halliwell, the members went on the dole to make the band workable. A demo tape was made and heard by Virgin Records staff member Miles Leonard, who organised a show for them in London in July 1991. Dave Boyd, who also worked at the label, signed them to Hut Records in September 1991.

Verve recorded "All in the Mind", alongside its B-sides "One Way to Go" and "Man Called Sun", at Impact Studios, a converted barn in Canterbury, Kent. Engineer Paul Schroeder, known for his work with the Stone Roses, served as producer, while Steve Elswood acted as engineer. The members were tripping on acid the entire time, which frontman Richard Ashcroft saw as a poor decision in hindsight. "All in the Mind" was compared to the sound of Happy Mondays, while taking influence from Echo & the Bunnymen.

"All in the Mind" was met with generally favourable reviews, while some critics also praised the B-sides. It topped the Independent Singles Charts in the UK. The artwork was shot in Mesnes Park in Wigan and conceptualised by designer Brian Cannon. Before the single was issued, Verve supported the Smashing Pumpkins on their UK tour; after its release, Verve supported Ride. Around this time, they earned the front page of Melody Maker, and through comments in NME, Ashcroft earned the moniker of "Mad Richard". Further shows with Ride and Spiritualized followed.

== Background ==
While attending higher education with his school friends Peter Salisbury and Simon Jones, Richard Ashcroft wanted to form a band. Around this time, Ashcroft heard Nick McCabe playing in a practice room at Winstanley College in Wigan, Greater Manchester. Jones and Salisbury had been in separate acts, which made Ashcroft desperate to form his own. After his mother bought him a guitar, Ashcroft started a band with McCabe and a friend as the bassist, named the Butterfly Effect, which was then changed to Raingarden. Since Ashcroft resided in Wigan with Jones, he asked him and Salisbury if they wanted to join. Practice sessions followed, with them trying to find their own sound while avoiding the emerging Madchester movement, spearheaded by the Stone Roses and Happy Mondays. While not having a band name, they made their live debut on 15 August 1990 at the Honeysuckle Pub in Poolstock. Despite only having two songs in their repertoire, friend and attendee Dave Halliwell offered to be their manager.

They settled on the name Verve prior to a Manchester show in early 1991. At the persuasion of Ashcroft, the rest of Verve quit their jobs and accompanied him on the dole in an effort to make the band workable. They subsequently spent most of their time jamming in Wigan, securing frequent shows in the town, and recording a demo while in the house of Jones' parents. (Note: Copies of said demo were sent to various labels, with the initial contact coming from Backs Records in Norwich, Norfolk. The company operated more as a distributor than a regular record label, working with The Cartel syndication associated with Rough Trade Records. Backs manager Derek Chapman suggested to Verve that they should start their own label; around this time, Rough Trade manager Dave Boyd queried Chapman about new material, with him suggesting Verve.) At this stage, the Madchester movement had reached an endpoint. Ashcroft said A&R representatives stopped seeking acts in the northern part of England. (Note: Demo tapes end up in the possession of CBS Records International and Polydor Records, both of whom sent it back. WEA International was interested and sent representatives to see them play at the Citadel in St Helens, Merseyside. Ultimately, the interest amounted to nothing, as did potential attraction from A&M, Island, and London Recordings.) During this time, Boyd started working at Virgin Records with Miles Leonard, the latter of whom left his job at Chrysalis Records. Leonard had told the head of A&R at that label about checking out Verve, whom he heard through their demo. After being told no, he went to Virgin, who let him travel to see the band in Manchester. Leonard arranged for the band to play a show for the whole A&R department of Virgin in London in July 1991; after this, they signed a publishing deal with Virgin Music. Boyd was moved by the performance that he signed them, which happened in September 1991.

== Recording ==
Verve joined the roster of independent label Hut Records, which had a contract with Virgin, which consisted of bands from the Madchester scene and other acts that had little support. (Note: Though Hut Records was set up earlier in 1991, the label wanted to foster artistic growth instead of aiming for instant success with its acts. Hut had made a deal with Virgin Records, which allowed them a better financial situation than other independent labels.) Their next show in London saw them support Whirlpool in December 1991; despite not sounding similar to them, Verve were tagged as part of the shoegaze scene. As Verve had no immediate shows, they opted to record "All in the Mind" at Impact Studios. The space was a converted barn located in Canterbury, Kent, with engineer Paul Schroeder serving as producer. Leonard said they wanted to avoid using a popular producer in an attempt at retaining their rawness, and he picked him with the notion that he would not be overbearing. Schroeder had previously collaborated with John Leckie on the Stone Roses' self-titled debut album (1989); (Note: Leckie later contacted Verve with the desire of producing them, having seen them at the London gig with Whirlpool. He ended up producing and mixing Verve's debut studio album, A Storm in Heaven, in 1993.) Steve Elswood acted as engineer for the sessions.

The members of Verve were annoyed that they were unable to replicate the sound they had in their heads. Ashcroft attributed this to the members tripping on acid the whole time; Egan remarked that this decision created "predictably ghastly results". Ashcroft said the drugs were a poor decision: "We had some acid and thought what we’d done was brilliant and, of course, when we listened back it was terrible." They ultimately recorded "All in the Mind", "Man Called Sun", and "One Way to Go". "Man Called Sun" was re-recorded after a similar acid-influenced version had been made the day prior. Throughout recording, Egan said it shifted from an upbeat track to an extended, slow-moving type song. Leonard retrospectively said the sessions saw the members develop their unique personalities, such as McCabe wanting to continually improve whatever they were working on, as he could hear a better rendition in his head.

== Composition ==
Baker said "All in the Mind" had a "rock 'n' roll swagger allied to a weird dreamlike quality." He commented that the guitar sound heard in it was drawn out into a sinister drone; the song's breakdown section was compared to one heard on a dance recording. In contrast to a few years later, at the height of Britpop, newer acts were citing 1960s bands as influences. Baker wrote that Verve composed the song to be "so obviously retro [that it] was pretty much unthinkable [in 1991]." It was compared to the work of Happy Mondays; Clarke noted influences from Echo & the Bunnymen, alongside 1960s acts like the Byrds and the Rolling Stones. He wrote that its appeal resided in Ashcroft's cocky nature as a vocalist.

Baker said the bass part in "One Way to Go" evoked the work of the Cure, albeit with a tired, lethargic chorus from Ashcroft. "Man Called Sun" evoked "Planet Caravan" (1970) by Black Sabbath, as well as the overall style of the Doors. It showcases Jones' bass-playing abilities. Baker wrote that the tempo slows down akin to the work of Pink Floyd, while Ashcroft's "spacily detached" voice is found to be "drifting over Nick’s chiming guitar", recalling the sound of the Orb. He said that while it "appears to be going nowhere", the song "has its own ominous power which is reinforced by the ringing bell towards the end."

== Artwork ==
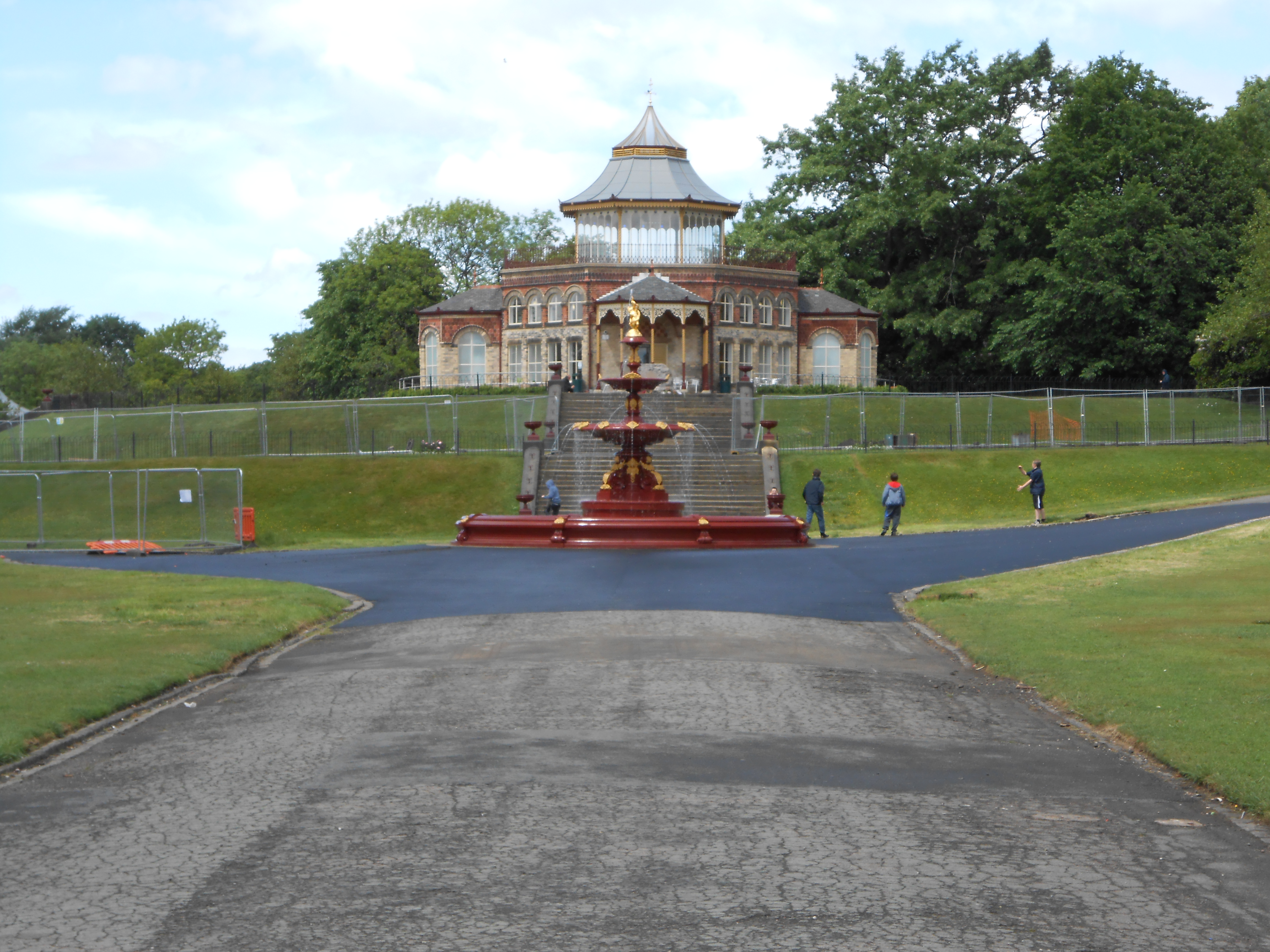
The artwork for "All in the Mind" was shot in Mesnes Park, Wigan.

Ashcroft met designer Brian Cannon while at a party in Wigan during his college period. He was interested in Cannon's work at the time; two years later, when Verve got signed, the pair reconnected at a petrol station. Ashcroft told him to contact Halliwell as they wanted to collaborate with him. Virgin Records planned to use a design company based in London that they had previously employed, until Ashcroft proposed Cannon's services. Up to this point, Cannon had minimal exposure, having done sleeves for Manchester rap groups Kiss AMC and Ruthless Rap Assassins. Cannon went to Ashcroft's flat in Orrell, Wigan, to have a meeting with the rest of the band in December 1991. He then travelled to London two days later to show his ideas to Virgin in an attempt to convince them.

The concept for the front cover was created after Cannon had been given a lyric sheet and recording of "All in the Mind" by Ashcroft, with the latter telling him the type of mood he was looking for. Baker said Cannon based the artwork for "All in the Mind" on a "surreal, warped version of the strange life they were living at the time." It shows members of the band on household furniture against the backdrop of Mesnes Park, located in Wigan. Cannon said this area was picked as it was a location that he and the band members knew from their childhood. Beforehand, he had researched the park, took some test images, and created mock-ups of the sleeves. The park photo shoot happened in January 1992, over the course of three-to-four hours. Cannon commented, "I just thought, 'You need some kind of bizarre vision for this kind of music' [...] the music was always the inspiration. Otherwise you're cheating the band and the public."

Photographer Michael Spencer Jones took the front cover image, which he compared to a photo shoot in the vein of Cecil B. DeMille. He originally took it in colour but felt it did not have the right atmosphere, prompting him to shoot it using infrared, which made it look akin to a scene by painter Hieronymus Bosch. Baker said the artwork was fitting to the song, as the track came across as an amalgamation of the band's influences. Fiona Huston contributed photography to the rear side of the sleeve. Individuals included on the front cover artwork include: Cannon's mother and father at the furthest end of the photo; his friend Steve Mack in the centre; Leonard, who is dressed as a speargun fisherman, stood on a flower pot; to the left is the band the Bed Event, who included future Verve DJ Wayne Griggs; Cannon's sister below the Bed Event; Halliwell, who is wearing a postman outfit, in reference to his father's job; and a man known as Rob in preacher attire, speaking to a crowd. The majority of the furniture seen belonged to Ashcroft, while a lamp and plants were taken from Cannon's flat. Cannon remarked that while they had secured a license to use the park for a shoot, the location was not closed off, resulting in some unknown individuals being featured on the cover.

== Release and touring ==
With further shows in London, Verve attracted attention from national newspapers. In February 1992, they supported the Smashing Pumpkins on their tour of the UK. During the London show, Ashcroft was angered by Verve not having a soundcheck and having their set shortened. Baker said they did not want the hassle to be seen as second-best. (Note: Verve reportedly cancelled a planned tour with Catherine Wheel in direct reaction to this situation. Catherine Wheel disputed this, saying that the God Machine were scheduled to support their shows, not Verve.) Despite this, they cancelled headlining shows, which were booked to promote "All in the Mind", to instead support Ride at their gigs. In the lead-up to the "All in the Mind" single, the band received the front page of Melody Maker on the issue dated 7 March 1992. Baker said some journalists enthusiastically gravitated to the "charisma and presence of Verve. Nevertheless, there were many others who viewed them with suspicion and even derision", which was the result of Ashcroft telling the popular music publications that one day he would be able to fly. Associates and staff members at Hut attempted to explain that he could achieve it through the band's music. Despite this, he was dubbed "Mad Richard". Roger Morton, who wrote of it originally in the NME, later explained that the rest of the staff at the magazine jumped at the situation, despite Morton inferring it as a throwaway comment. (Note: Morton explained that the situation served as positive press coverage for Verve as it gave listeners an understanding of the band's principals: "No harm done really. I don't know if he really literally thought he could fly! He was a good interview[ee], not mad exactly, just a bit out there." In the face of the positive publicity it gave the band, Ashcroft was frustrated by the "Mad Richard" name, which he later said stuck around for four years.)

The same day as the Melody Maker front cover, the band recorded a John Peel session for BBC Radio 1, where they played "Slide Away", “She's a Superstar", "Already There", and an untitled track. "All in the Mind" was released as a single on 9 March 1992. The music video for "All in the Mind" was directed by Miles Aldridge and was filmed in his London flat. Baker said that, as with Happy Mondays and the Stone Roses before them, Verve wished to evoke the attitude of rave culture through their instrumentation. He added that this ideal was best explored in the video, where it employs obscured visual imagery and fast camera motions, giving it a "dance-y, psychedelic feel." While Aldridge wanted them to mime their performances to the track, they were unable to. Ashcroft said they compromised by having a different song playing, as he said that the idea of having to mime made them "feel incredibly uncomfortable almost like we were selling out". After a dozen gigs supporting Ride, Verve then supported Spiritualized on their tour. Alongside the wider exposure, the trek marked a change for Verve, with them taking influence from Spiritualized in their performances, which Spiritualized frontman Jason Pierce took notice of. (Note: Ashcroft later married former Spiritualized keyboardist Kate Radley in 1995; she was previously in a relationship with Pierce. Egan said Spiritualized's album Ladies and Gentlemen We Are Floating in Space (1997) included several tracks that seem to have taken lyrical inspiration from what Ashcroft had written on the Verve's second studio album, A Northern Soul (1995).) In between dates of the tour, Verve supported Ride again for a one-off show at the Brixton Academy and headlined a show at the Powerhaus, both venues in London.

An expanded version of A Storm in Heaven was issued in 2016, which included "All in the Mind" and its B-sides. "All in the Mind" was included on Verve's second compilation album, This Is Music: The Singles 92–98 (2004), while the music video for it was featured on the video album of the same name. A live rendition of "A Man Called Sun" was included on the "Gravity Grave" single in late 1992, though it was omitted from the 10-inch vinyl edition. A live recording of "One Way to Go" was featured on the Voyager 1 EP, released in early 1993. The studio version of "One Way to Go" was included on the band's first compilation album, No Come Down. It was issued to coincide with the band's US tour in early 1994.

== Reception ==
Egan noted that "All in the Mind" received generally favourable reviews. Melody Maker reviewer Ian Gittins saw the song as a "Doors-on-a-serious-downer brooding trip into the psyche and boasts a rare and valuable arrogance for a début offering." He concluded by remarking that the single was a "neat departure point for any subsequent voyages of self-discovery. A good springboard. So how high can they fly?" The staff at Time Out wrote: "Earnest young man waxes metaphysical over the whine of a blender on the puree setting. Pour into your prettiest bowl, decorate with angelica strands and serve." Select's Nick Griffiths and Michele Kirsch of City Limits both highlighted the influence from Happy Mondays on the song, with the latter stating it was too much to "lift me off terra firma but [it was] redeemed by some inventive guitar bits." AllMusic reviewer Brian Horgea praised "All in the Mind" for being a "pop gem with its psychedelic guitar hook," though he acknowledged that it was "not a good representation of the Verve's sound at the time." He explained that it was an overt aftermath of an unknown act's "unsure first trip into the recording studio." The staff at Good Times was more positive, saying that it featured a "groove that gets right under the skin, wobbles about a bit, then emanates from every orifice you’ve got. Bloody downright marvellous!” In a retrospective review from BrooklynVegan contributor Bill Pearis, he called "All in the Mind" a "propulsive space-hopper jam" that showcases the expert performances from McCabe, Jones, and Salisbury.

Some critics also commented positively on the other songs, "One Way to Go" and "Man Called Sun". Gittins praised the former for being a "beautiful languid drift which [...] pursues its dreams way up beyond the clouds [...]" Pearis noted that "One Way to Go" and "Man Called Sun" signalled the band's direction on A Storm in Heaven. Horgea expanded on this, saying that both tracks display the band's knack for making "groove[s], building moody songs out of repetitive phrases that are the perfect backdrop for Richard Ashcroft's acid-tinged lyrics." Egan said "Man Called Sun" was the best of the three tracks on the single. He explained that it was highly indie in tone, and the "tinniness and low fidelity made the epic nature of the lyric to 'All in the Mind' [...] seem slightly ridiculous [in comparison]." Griffiths, on the other hand, commented that apart from "Man Called Sun", the single had a "couple of bloody good songs." Clarke commented that while all of the songs were "dripping with sheer attitude," he found the B-sides far superior to "All in the Mind".

"All in the Mind" topped the Independent Singles Charts in the UK.

== Track listings ==
All songs written by Verve. All recordings produced by Paul Schroeder.

7-inch vinyl track listing

1. "All in the Mind" – 4:16
2. "One Way to Go" – 7:16

12-inch vinyl and CD extra track

3. "Man Called Sun" – 5:44

== Personnel ==
Personnel per sleeve.

Production and design

- Paul Schroeder – producer, mixing
- Steve Elswood – engineer
- Michael Spencer Jones – photography front
- Fiona Huston – photography back
- Brian Cannon – sleeve design, art direction

== Charts ==
Chart performance for "All in the Mind"
Chart (1992)	Peak position
UK Independent Singles Charts	1
