= This Is Music: The Singles 92–98 =

Compilation album by The Verve
- Released: 1 November 2004
- Recorded: 1991–1998
- Genre: Alternative rock; Britpop; psychedelic rock
- Length: 67:30
- Label: EMI; Virgin
- Producer: The Verve; Owen Morris; John Leckie; Youth; Barry Clempson; Paul Schroeder

The Verve chronology
Urban Hymns (1997)	This Is Music: The Singles 92–98 (2004)	Forth (2008)

Professional ratings
Review scores
Source	Rating
AllMusic	4.5/5 stars
The Austin Chronicle	4/5 stars
Pitchfork	8.3/10
Yahoo! Music	8/10 stars

This is Music: The Singles 92–98 is a singles compilation album by the English alternative rock band the Verve. The compilation was released in November 2004 and included two previously unreleased tracks: "This Could Be My Moment" and "Monte Carlo". Nick McCabe did not participate in the songs, Simon Tong being the one that played lead guitar. The album was named after a track by the same name off their 1995 album A Northern Soul. The album cover is based on the cover of their 1992 single "She's a Superstar". In 2025 it was re-released on vinyl, replacing the two previously unreleased songs with the two singles from Forth. Consequently, for this edition, the 92–98 part of the title was dropped, although the sticker adds "1992–2008".

== Track listing ==
All tracks written by Richard Ashcroft, Simon Jones, Peter Salisbury, and Nick McCabe, except where noted.

2004 CD track listing
No.	Title	Originally from	Length
1.	"This Is Music"	A Northern Soul, 1995	3:38
2.	"Slide Away"	A Storm in Heaven, 1993	4:06
3.	"Lucky Man" (Ashcroft)	Urban Hymns, 1997	4:49
4.	"History"	A Northern Soul, 1995	5:28
5.	"She's a Superstar" (edit)	Verve EP, 1992	5:04
6.	"On Your Own"	A Northern Soul, 1995	3:36
7.	"Blue"	A Storm in Heaven, 1993	3:39
8.	"Sonnet" (Ashcroft)	Urban Hymns, 1997	4:24
9.	"All in the Mind"	Non-album single, 1992	4:17
10.	"The Drugs Don't Work" (Ashcroft)	Urban Hymns, 1997	5:05
11.	"Gravity Grave"	Verve EP, 1992	8:21
12.	"Bitter Sweet Symphony" (Ashcroft)	Urban Hymns, 1997	5:59
13.	"This Could Be My Moment" (Ashcroft)	Previously unreleased	3:59
14.	"Monte Carlo"	Previously unreleased	4:58
Total length:			67:30

Japanese edition bonus track
No.	Title	Originally from	Length
15.	"I See the Door"	"On Your Own" single, 1995	5:20
Total length:			72:58

2025 vinyl edition extra tracks
No.	Title	Originally from	Length
5.	"She's a Superstar" (original)	Non-album single, 1992	8:56
13.	"Love Is Noise"	Forth, 2008	5:29
14.	"Rather Be"	Forth, 2008	5:38
Total length:			75:08

== Charts ==
=== Weekly charts ===
Weekly chart performance for This Is Music: The Singles 92–98
Chart (2004)	Peak position
Australian Albums (ARIA)	133
Austrian Albums (Ö3 Austria)	59
Irish Albums (IRMA)	28
Italian Albums (FIMI)	48
UK Albums (Official Charts)	15

=== Year-end charts ===
Year-end chart performance for This Is Music: The Singles 92–98
Chart (2004)	Position
UK Albums (OCC)	172

== Certifications ==
Certifications for This Is Music: The Singles 92–98
Region	Certification	Certified units/sales
Brazil (Pro-Música Brasil)	Platinum	125,000^{‡}
Ireland (IRMA)	Gold	7,500^{^}
United Kingdom (BPI)	Platinum	300,000^{^}
^{^} Shipments figures based on certification alone.^{‡} Sales+streaming figures based on certification alone.

== Release history ==
Release history and formats for This Is Music: The Singles 92–98
Country	Date	Label	Format	Catalog
United Kingdom	1 November 2004	EMI, Virgin	CD	CDV 2991
Australia	8 November 2004	EMI	CD	8636892
United States	16 November 2004	Virgin	CD	7243 8 63688 2 9
Japan	17 November 2004	Toshiba-EMI	CD	VJCP-68692
