= A Northern Soul =

1995 album by The Verve

Studio album by the Verve
- Released: 3 July 1995
- Recorded: October 1994 – February 1995
- Studios: Loco, Wales; Abbey Road, London
- Genres: Alternative rock; psychedelic rock; psychedelic soul; Britpop
- Length: 64:02
- Labels: Hut; Vernon Yard
- Producers: Owen Morris; The Verve

The Verve chronology
No Come Down (1994)	A Northern Soul (1995)	Urban Hymns (1997)

Singles from A Northern Soul
- 1. "This Is Music" Released: 1 May 1995; 2. "On Your Own" Released: 12 June 1995; 3. "History" Released: 18 September 1995

A Northern Soul is the second studio album by English rock band the Verve, released on 3 July 1995 through Hut Records. With the tumultuous promotion for their debut studio album, A Storm in Heaven (1993), combined with their friends in Oasis becoming exceptionally popular, relationships between members of the Verve became strained. After connecting with Oasis producer Owen Morris, the Verve went to a rehearsal space in Wigan to write material for the next album, which they recorded at Loco Studios in Wales. The sessions gained notoriety for the stories that emerged from the time, including vocalist Richard Ashcroft going missing for five days and him allegedly totalling a car on the studio's lawn. In the first three weeks, they had finished 15 tracks; after this point, the situation soured as guitarist Nick McCabe grew exhausted from dealing with the other members frequently partying and taking ecstasy, in addition to Ashcroft and Morris shouting and destroying objects. At one point, McCabe began to have a different working schedule from the others, starting at 10–11 a.m. while the rest of the band started at 6 p.m.

Variously described as alternative rock, psychedelic rock, and psychedelic soul, Ashcroft said A Northern Soul revolved around one person experiencing various emotions. He wrote material for it after the end of a six-year relationship, using a portastudio at co-manager John Best's house over several weeks. The Verve started promotion with a UK gig supporting Oasis in April 1995, followed by one in France two days later. After McCabe was injured in an altercation with a bouncer, a month's worth of shows were cancelled. "This Is Music" was released as the lead single from the album in May 1995, followed by the second single, "On Your Own", a month later. The Verve embarked on a UK tour in June 1995, which was followed by appearances at the Glastonbury and Phoenix Festivals. They went on a US tour, which lasted until August 1995, when they returned to the UK to play at T in the Park. At its conclusion, Ashcroft announced his departure from the band, which the press reported as if they were breaking up. "History" was the third and final single from the album, released in September 1995.

A Northern Soul received positive reviews from music critics, many of whom praised the album's musical depth, while others commented on the personal nature of the lyrics. Retrospective reviews and biographies of the Verve were also focused on the music. The album peaked at number 13 on the UK Albums Chart, going on to be certified gold by the British Phonographic Industry (BPI) in 1998. All three of its singles peaked within the top 40 of the UK Singles Chart, with "History" peaking the highest at number 24. Melody Maker, NME, and Select included the album on their lists of the year's best releases; NME also included it on their list of the 500 best albums of all time, while author Colin Larkin featured it in his book All Time Top 1000 Albums (2000). It has appeared on best-of lists for the Britpop genre by Musikexpress, Pitchfork, and Spin.

== Background ==
The Verve released their debut studio album, A Storm in Heaven, in June 1993 through the Virgin imprint Hut Records. Reaching number 27 in the UK Albums Chart, it entered a music scene dominated by grunge, sitting against the emergence of British bands Blur and Suede. Shortly afterwards, frontman Richard Ashcroft said he wanted to record the follow-up as soon as possible. In 1993, the band promoted the album with a UK tour, a European tour with the Smashing Pumpkins – by which point they were writing songs for their next album – a US tour with Acetone, and ending with a UK tour with Acetone and up-and-comers Oasis. The Verve's notoriety as troublemakers was exacerbated by connecting themselves with Oasis. In 1994, the Verve went on a Europe tour, trekked across the US as part of Lollapalooza, and played a series of European festivals, including Reading Festival. In the lead-up to Lollapalooza, the compilation No Come Down (1994) was issued as a stop-gap release. Keith Wood of the Verve's US label, Vernon Yard Recordings, said the band initially planned to record their second album around this time, until they decided to do Lollapalooza instead.

Issues plagued the members during the stint, including drummer Peter Salisbury getting arrested and Ashcroft being taken to the hospital for not drinking enough fluids. The grind of touring the US eventually took its toll on Ashcroft and guitarist Nick McCabe, with the pair not being on friendly terms. Throughout that year, interpersonal relationships between members of the Verve grew apart, spurred on by the ballooning popularity of their friends in Oasis. That band's debut, Definitely Maybe (1994), had performed better on the charts than A Storm in Heaven, which was a commercial failure. Author Trevor Baker, in his book Richard Ashcroft – The Verve, Burning Money & The Human Condition (2008), wrote that following the popularity of Definitely Maybe, sales predictions for indie acts shifted considerably, and the band were seen by some commentators as lucky for not being removed from the Virgin Records roster. (Note: Baker said one important change in the mid-1990s was BBC Radio 1 playing more guitar-based music, citing that Blur, who released one of the early Britpop songs, "For Tomorrow", received little airplay when it was released in 1993.) Brian Cannon of the design company Microdot, who created art for both Oasis and the Verve, attributed the frequent support of Hut Records boss Dave Boyd as a factor.

== Writing and Morris' involvement ==
Since the recording of their debut album, Ashcroft had some life-changing experiences that would fuel his songwriting. Towards the end of 1994, Ashcroft and his girlfriend Sarah Carpenter ended their six-year relationship when the latter became infatuated with one of the band's roadies, Andy Burke, who was also one of Ashcroft's best friends. (Note: Carpenter said their relationship started going sour as the Verve's career was on the rise. Starting when they signed to Hut Records, when Ashcroft was occupied with touring and recording, she felt neglected and sought comfort in Burke. While the pair started falling in love, she claimed that she was never intimate with him. She told Ashcroft this when he called her, inquiring about her and Burke; it escalated into an argument, which ended when he slammed the phone down, marking the last time they spoke to each other.) As Ashcroft was dealing with this, Jones was also going through mental struggles. The latter found it difficult to acclimatise at home in Wigan after Lollapalooza and the US in general. McCabe was also breaking up with his pregnant girlfriend Monica; he was growing weary of others around him. Ashcroft fled to London and, subsequently, the countryside without informing anyone. Ashcroft attempted to reconcile with her in London over a period of three months. For two of those three, he was mentally and physically exhausted. When he reconvened with the rest of the band, they were performing the music that he felt conveyed the emotions he was experiencing, allowing the two aspects to go together with relative ease. Ashcroft stayed with Best, who was dating Lush frontwoman Miki Berenyi, for a period of six-to-eight weeks. Best had a portastudio in his frontroom that Berenyi used for making songs, which Ashcroft used when borrowing her acoustic guitar to write for himself.

When the band wanted a different producer for their second album, Noel Gallagher of Oasis proposed Owen Morris, who had co-produced Definitely Maybe. (Note: Members of the Verve were enthusiastic about Definitely Maybe; Egan suggested that its commercial success could be a factor in their decision to go with Morris. The album had been number one in the UK and was also the fastest-selling debut album in that country. Egan said Oasis were now considerably bigger than the Verve, while members of the latter yearned for that success for themselves.) Morris himself shared a similar perspective on the rock and roll lifestyle as the Verve. Ashcroft said they went with him as he was around their age and equally as intense as the rest of the band in "everything we do, lifestyle, music, everything ..." As the members wanted to avoid repeating mistakes that they had made on A Storm in Heaven, they set about writing prior to entering a studio. The band holed up in their former rehearsal space in Wigan, which Ashcroft dubbed a "black hole, a claustrophobic pit." The space was located in a dark industrial warehouse, which they felt was inspirational to the point that Ashcroft and McCabe put aside their personal issues. The members drove around during the night on occasion, seeking further inspiration. Ashcroft learned of a tale from Keith Richards where he talked about the Rolling Stones being mocked by Dean Martin, which he connected to and used as an influence: "That's what happened to us ... we just thought, 'Fuck you all, we're gonna delve into our black hole in Wigan and make the greatest music you've heard in your life.'" Morris, whose visibility as a producer increased after Definitely Maybe, visited the band during one of their rehearsals, feeling enthusiastic about what he was hearing. It was a fruitful period, with them having two albums' worth of songs in time for recording, contrasting with creating the bulk of A Storm in Heaven as they were recording it.

== Recording ==
The initial idea for the recording sessions was to take recording gear to their rehearsal room, as they were the most productive there, and it had the right atmosphere. When they realised that it was impractical to use it for recording, they decided on Loco Studios in Wales. Philip Wilding, author of The Verve: Bitter Sweet (1998), wrote that the sessions for their second album became mythologised as a combination of "lurid stories and gruesome hearsay echoing in stories of drug-fuelled jam sessions that became extensive recording sessions and bouts of reckless violence." Baker conveyed a similar situation, while singling out co-manager John Best for describing the situation as lunatics running an asylum. Author Sean Egan, in his book The Verve: Star Sail (1998), said various tales have since come out about the sessions, including: Ashcroft allegedly totalling a hired car by driving it on the studio's lawn; the band often playing a single song for hours at a time; Ashcroft disappearing for five days; and the band debating whether to destroy a tape machine, which was valued at £100,000, so that they could get a sound to end the album on. Morris, who co-produced the sessions with them, said his job was to contain the audio of the band performing and not make it sound bland. The band and Morris were assisted in the studio by engineer Mark Lee. To aid the recording sessions, the band gave the studio a club atmosphere by playing music the entire time, taking ecstasy, and working on material when they felt inspired to. By the first three weeks, they had completed 15 songs; by contrast, for A Storm in Heaven, they only did one song a week in the same length of time. As the band as a unit strived for perfection, it meant that the individual members had strained relationships with one another. After this point, the situation soured as McCabe, bagged by the issues with Monica, became tired of the frequent partying that the other members were doing. He said Ashcroft and Morris were yelling and breaking objects. Jones said they did not need any encouragement from Morris, who was "as mad as you like", adding that it was "all ... too much."

While Jones did not explain what happened during the sessions, Boyd said it was a group of people growing up, combined with ecstasy consumption. There was one instance where the band was locked out from entering the studio because an employee was concerned about what they could do to the facilities. Boyd said Morris was also consuming ecstasy; there was one three-week period where Morris and the band ingested the drug every day. On one occasion, Best visited the studio only to find Morris, who was high on ecstasy, standing on the recording console with a glass of alcohol. He promptly threw the drink at the room's glass wall, leaving a hole the size of a large bullet. Best compared the encounter to entering a turbulent celebration with a "lunatic edge to it." He noticed that the members were operating on different schedules. As McCabe had a child, he wanted to start working at 10–11 a.m. and finish at 10–11 p.m. The rest of the band, meanwhile, woke up at 2 p.m., recorded at 6 p.m., and finished at 6 a.m. the following morning. McCabe said he was emotionally distraught, reaching a point where the only common trait between them was creating music, while his life at home was equally a "disaster and I didn't feel comfortable anywhere." He was forced to contribute more during the sessions than other guitarists would, owing to him having to track both the rhythm and lead guitar parts. Egan said these parts were "already more complex than most bands' because of the atmospheric nature of The Verve's music." McCabe found the partying boring and an annoying distraction.

[Going to the studio, I] realis[ed] that here was a band that were in the throes of excess. They were on the brink of collapsing or damaging themselves but at the same time hearing songs like 'A New Decade' or 'History' – you just heard that tension, almost darkness that was there. There were the classic highs and lows of a really drugged-up session and that was reflected in the music.

— Miles Leonard from Virgin Records upon visiting the sessions

Ashcroft came close to being a casualty of drugs akin to Roky Erickson or Arthur Lee of Love; he was still emotionally damaged from his split with Carpenter, which did not help. When Ashcroft came to this realisation, he was distraught, only to be exacerbated when he had a vision of Syd Barrett of Pink Floyd, another drug casualty. Following this, the band returned to their habit of jamming for days at a time in an attempt to make music that was as worthwhile as something by their musical heroes. When they finished working on a song, they relaxed in the studio's lounge, listening to the likes of Miles Davis, Funkadelic, and Gram Parsons. Everyone eventually came to the conclusion that the only time work was done was on Wednesdays. Baker said the band took "three days to build up to a peak and then spend the next three days coming down." Part of this stemmed from Ashcroft becoming a more confident songwriter; he was content to offer his voice on finished backing tracks, though after the split from Carpenter, he had written stylistically different material. Baker said while their debut album appealed to music obsessives, the new material appeared more direct, with Ashcroft being enthusiastic about how his lyrics were developing for their new album. The strings for "History", performed by Gavyn Wright and the London Session Orchestra, were recorded at Studio 2 at Abbey Road Studios in London. Here, Ashcroft, Liam Gallagher, and 30 associates of the band contributed handclaps to the track.

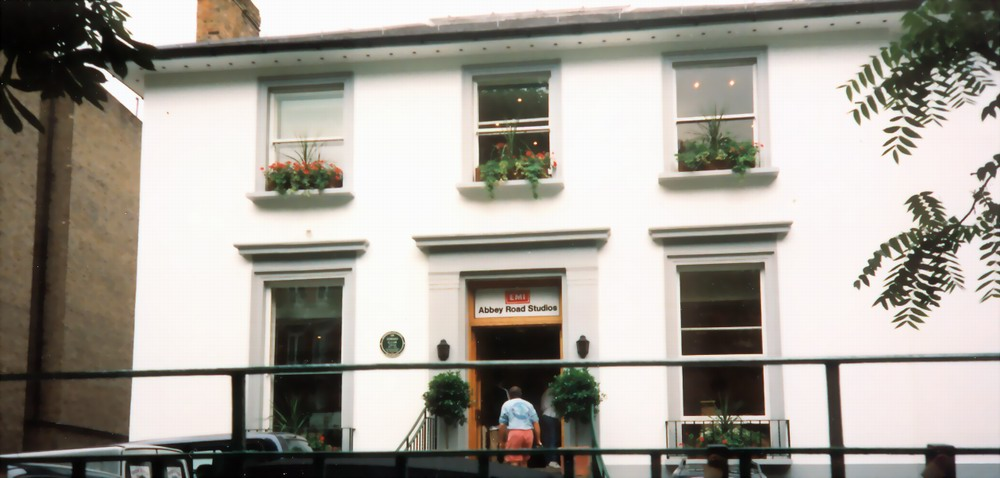
Abbey Road Studios, located in London, where the strings were recorded for "History".

Morris was exhausted from the sessions as the band, going as far as to say they did not need a producer as they would "do [a] producer's head in." According to Jones, Morris exclaimed that he would never work with the Verve again, almost quitting towards the end of the sessions. Ashcroft commended Morris for involving himself to the degree that he saw him akin to a member of the band, adding that they sought a producer that was "extreme. Owen brought his personality to the record. [...] He admitted he nearly had a nervous breakdown, and I think that's a commendable performance." He summarised the process as four challenging months that were "insane. In great ways and terrible ways. In ways that only good music and bad drugs and mixed emotions can make." Outtakes from the album's sessions included "The Rolling People" and "Come On", both of which were tackled during recording sessions in 1997. Two weeks were spent mixing the recordings, which took place at Loco. To retain a raw sound, minimal overdubs were done to the tracks. The final mix was intentionally bottom heavy, with the bass and drums being placed higher in the mix to what Egan described as a "thumping feel at odds with the sterility of the CD age. Again, this tied in with the convoluted 'soul' concept that The Verve returned to repeatedly in interview." Ashcroft said listeners ignored bass and drums "for too long. On our albums you have to turn it down, which is cool, like in a lot of good soul records, Sly [Stone] records, heavy bass ..." McCabe typically preferred the demos they made, as he thought the songs lost their edge when they were recorded properly. He said working with Leckie on their debut, they had to concede, and while working with Morris, it allowed them to have "a lot more control over the sound." The album was then mastered by Jack Adams at The Townhouse in London.

== Composition and lyrics ==
=== Title and music ===
Discussing the album, Ashcroft said the "doors have opened for me personally with my writing. We've been liberated. Touring, you get lost on a rock and roll adventure. You're on the Stardust trip. You're in the mansion in your head with the white robes on doing rock operas called 'Woman'. But then you come home and it's time to get twenty Regal and a pastie and assess who you are. That's why the new album's got more soul to it. It's modern Northern blues." Egan said a possibility for the album's title was how the Verve viewed their sound as the "result of a fundamental sincerity." musicOMH's Ben Hogwood suggested that the title was a confident declaration of their Wigan lineage, which he said was a noble proclamation, though "ultimately a doomed one." He added that it was taken from the 1960s Northern soul movement, where it focuses its "impact on the whole body and mind rather than just the feet, shaking it from the very core." Ashcroft said the album revolved around one person experiencing various emotions: "pretty painted, then elated, then arrogant. All facets of that personality are a northern soul." Egan said this character was Ashcroft incognito, writing that a few critics were sceptical about how an individual "'soul' could have gone through such torment as to inspire such desolate songwords ..."

Gigwise writer AP Childs considered A Northern Soul an alternative rock album that surpasses the "stargazer dreaminess of the previous offering with its tortured glamour of industrial-sized proportions." He said that, beside "Brainstorm Interlude", there was little psychedelic music to be found on it. Nick Southall of Stylus Magazine dubbed it "[m]odern, urban, tortured psychedelic soul", while Spin's Alex Pappademas saw it as psychedelic rock and Britpop. Clarke was dismissive of the Britpop tag, adamant that the Verve had nothing to do with that genre musically or visually. Kayley Kravitz of Vanyaland reaffirmed Britpop, saying the Verve did what Blur and Lush had done before them, moving away from shoegaze and into Britpop. Best said the album had two different sides at odds with one another: "You've got songs that are traditional Verve psychedelic work-outs and then you've got songs like 'History' that I heard and thought, Wow! This is a very interesting new development." McCabe felt that his playing ability had also improved, owing to the two years promoting A Storm in Heaven.

Jones explained that it was not literal soul music but rather soul music in the manner that they were "expressing ourselves and playing from our heart. A lot of the songs on this album are first takes, just us going in and playing from a feeling." PopMatters writer Ian King wrote that McCabe's guitar playing informed the sound of A Northern Soul and noted that it was an important point in their history where Ashcroft's skill as a songwriter began to take hold of the band, highlighting "On Your Own" and "History" as prime examples. He remarked that both are stylistically different – "On Your Own" being a slow-tempo acoustic ballad and "History" serving as a symphonic track – and both feature less guitarwork. King said that McCabe's guitar playing originally helped them stand out from their contemporaries more than Ashcroft did. A Northern Soul marked the point where Ashcroft became the leader of the Verve. In addition to their usual roles in the band, the members provided extra instrumentations to the songs: Ashcroft with percussion on "This Is Music", "So It Goes", "History", and "Life's an Ocean", acoustic guitar on "On Your Own", "So It Goes", "History", and "Stormy Clouds", and electric piano on "No Knock on My Door"; Jones with percussion on "A New Decade", keyboards on "A Northern Soul", twelve-string acoustic guitar on "History"; McCabe with piano on "On Your Own" and "Stormy Clouds", twelve-string guitar on "On Your Own", acoustic guitar on "So It Goes" and "Stormy Clouds", Hammond organ on "So It Goes", and a Moog synthesizer on "Stormy Clouds"; and Salisbury with percussion on "A New Decade", "This Is Music", "So It Goes", "History", and "Life's an Ocean".

=== Themes ===
On the album's lyrics, Ashcroft said that, as a whole, it was him "asking myself: 'Who the fuck am I?' Am I the guy in 'This Is Music' standing tall in the world with these huge guitars around him like the king of rock 'n' roll, or am I the guy in 'A Northern Soul' who's wasted and desperate, or am I the guy in 'On Your Own', who's in between life and death, or am I the guy in 'Life's an Ocean' imagining the future and buying feelings from a vending machine, am I this future shock guy? But I'm all of them, you see. It’s dangerous to fracture your personality too much, but that’s what it was." Egan noted that there were allusions to a "broken love affair", which prompted questions as Ashcroft's emotional turmoil was not public knowledge until mid-1995. During an interview with journalist Dave Simpson for Melody Maker, Ashcroft talked about the subject matter with Jones, which nearly resulted in a heated argument between the members. Egan said the love triangle of Ashcroft–Carpenter–Burke resulted in an album with lyrics that were "far more literal and which had far more emotional impact" than anything Ashcroft previously wrote, a change from A Storm in Heaven, where he had no desire to compose lyrics with a political tone or discuss romance. (Note: Ashcroft married Kate Radley in 1995; she was previously in a relationship with Jason Pierce of Spiritualized. Egan said their album Ladies and Gentlemen We Are Floating in Space (1997) included several tracks that "echo the heartache expressed" through Ashcroft's words on A Northern Soul. One song in particular, "Come Together", had phrases with similar vocal inflictions to Ashcroft.) He said A Northern Soul could potentially be viewed as a concept album because of these lyrics. Describing the changing lyrical tone, Egan wrote that A Storm in Heaven was centred around "slogans and wordplay," which were the product of listening to other albums and watching films, compared to A Northern Soul, where the lyrics were a result of Ashcroft having first-hand experiences. Ashcroft said the first album's lyrics were highly vague as he thought he had not gone through enough events in his life to conceive upping the quality of his lyrics, but in the two years since their debut album, he has witnessed various "things, I realise that when I listen to music I want to hear people who have been there, and if they've not been there I'm not interested, and I've been there now."

Ashcroft thought that if someone is direct about what they say, then other individuals will relate to how accessible it is. Clarke said he was influenced by poems by William Blake, dating to the late 1800s and early 1900s, especially his collection Songs of Innocence and Experience. Blake's writing led him to discover Aldous Huxley, who had admiration for Blake. One instance saw Ashcroft borrow some of the lines from Blake's London, which he thought was poignant after the split from Carpenter. Ashcroft spent several hours walking directionless around London prior to making a demo of "History" with a Spanish guitar that belonged to his mother. He admitted to intentionally lifting the lines from the poem until his own lyrics came about through a stream of consciousness. NME writer Simon Williams was highly critical of this borrowing, saying, "Forsooth! Fetch this good fellow a flagon of your finest ale." On "A New Decade", Ashcroft acknowledges the success the band had achieved up to this point, while on "This Is Music", he details his fascination with music. Clarke said "On Your Own" "repeats the idea of an emotional void", adding that the "cathartic nature of much of the album appeared to have given him new hope ..." Hogwood said on A Storm in Heaven, Ashcroft's voice was lost within the big sound of the album, fighting against the guitar and bass for presence, while on A Northern Soul, this changed, where Ashcroft's lyrics stood out considerably more. Clarke thought it was ironic that within the band's "apparent spiritual and mystical imagery, much of this album was actually rooted in quite mundane issues ..."

== Songs ==
=== Tracks 1–5 ===
Baker remarked that the first 10 seconds of opener "A New Decade" came across as akin to the sound of A Storm in Heaven, with Ashcroft's voice fading in, "woo-woohing gently somewhere far off in the distance. Then, suddenly, the guitars kick the metaphorical doors in and Richard bellow the title like he's announcing the start of a whole new era." Baker noted that the most prominent change compared to past material is Ashcroft's vocals being placed higher in the mix while the guitars sounded aggressive, writing that it remained space rock, "but it's Star Wars rather than 2001: A Space Odyssey." King said the lyrics appeared to be positive, at least until the listener reaches a certain frame of mind. He points out an emergency siren-like sound that is heard throughout the song, signalling that the band come across as "angry and wounded." With it and the following track, King wrote that Ashcroft discusses having anxiety with regards to an uncertain direction, the future generation, fear of isolation, class systems, and apathy, as the other members strike "out more concisely and determined than ever."

Baker thought that "This Is Music" had a "belligerent spirit [that] was immediately very apparent. Instead of singing vague platitudes about the sky and the sun, as he had in the past, Richard was suddenly addressing the real world." It was Ashcroft's first political song, originating after he met an Eton alumni. (Note: Ashcroft previously made disparaging remarks about political music, not wishing to be "reminded of how dismal everything is." He added that the period of songs such as Bob Dylan's "Blowin' in the Wind" (1963) having an impact on society was over long ago. He acknowledged that there was a conversation to be had about more subtle political songs, such as Pulp's "Common People". "You've got to be more subliminal, yeah. Throw a few lines that get people thinking.") Ashcroft was bewildered by the number of opportunities open to him simply because he attended private school. He thought it was akin to someone starting the journey of life ninety metres ahead of everyone else. Ashcroft said the song's narrator was someone who had to fight to get what they wanted in any given situation. He added that he does not despise upper-class individuals, "but they do take the piss." (Note: Ashcroft gave an example where Chuck D of Public Enemy came to the UK, only for him to be embarrassed when he saw British newspapers focused on the current hairstyle of Princess Diana. Egan said that to Ashcroft, the issues stemmed from the 1980s, the "decade of self-aggrandisement, money-worship and Margret Thatcher's infamous comment that there was no longer any such thing as society.") Baker said alongside discussing class, the track talks about Ashcroft being single since the end of his last relationship, adding that his self-doubt was noticeable in the album's lyrics, and "yet by the time they were recorded, a drug-fuelled bravado has entered the mix." He attributed the vocals being discernible to the influence of Oasis, sounding fully "confident, bordering on arrogant," as Ashcroft steps into the band leader role. When Ashcroft heard the song for the first time, he said it lasted for 35 minutes and was similar to the sound of Funkadelic and Jimi Hendrix. McCabe's guitar sound is the result of playing a cast aluminium guitar that dates to the early 1980s that featured three strings and was out of tune, which Baker said gave the guitar riff a "harsh, metallic sound which fitted perfectly with the brutal music."

"On Your Own" marks the band's first ballad track, which Clarke wrote "left a disturbingly uneasy feeling about the ultimate solitude of life." Baker said it was a rarity in their music at this period, though it signalled the direction their later music went in, while Clarke said it was closer to their older songs. It marked the first time Ashcroft purposely sat down with a guitar, pen, and paper like typical songwriters. This was in contrast to his prior method of standing in front of the rest of the band as they jammed. He wrote it with little input from the rest of his bandmates; Baker described his voice as "uncharacteristically shaky," most prominently when he uses a falsetto during the chorus section, where he earns a comparison to soul singers, in particular Al Green. The song sees Ashcroft lamenting his love life and the eventual prospect of dying alone. Baker noted that there was not much space for McCabe's typical pedal-enhanced guitar experimentation in the song, with the remainder of the band serving only as a background to Ashcroft's voice. He said the vocals were "suddenly demanding all the space that Nick used to occupy and the most distinctive 'effect' is the tinkling piano", which appears in the song's conclusion. "So It Goes" harkens back to the sound of A Storm in Heaven. In the song, Hogwood said Ashcroft divulges self-doubt amongst the frequent guitar theatrics, with him trying to place distance between the rest of the Verve and himself. Baker said the song was not up to par, though he attributed this to the tracks that were placed on either side of it.

Danny Eccleston of Q thought that "A Northern Soul" evoked the sound of Funkadelic. Baker thought it contained the most peculiar guitar parts McCabe had created up to that point, and that with Jones' contribution, the song came across as "utterly rock 'n' roll without having any recognisably rock 'n' roll riffs, structure or melody." He proposed that it could be the work of the Chemical Brothers, albeit "slowed down to a mighty crawl. By the end, as the guitar morphs into seagull noises, you can almost hear the euphoria of the initially recording sessions changing into a disturbing psychosis, but it still carries an incredible charge." The song was influenced by Ashcroft learning about Gallagher disappearing when Oasis were on tour in the US the previous year, which Egan said explained the allusions to a Northern soul trying to return home. He added that Gallagher was not the sole inspiration for the track, saying that it also referred to a lot of working class Englishmen, in particular those in Northern England. Ashcroft said the song's narrator was considerably more vulnerable than Eddie Vedder of Pearl Jam, yet by its conclusion, "he looks around and says, 'I'm too busy staying alive. Too busy living.' There's got to be a blue horizon."

=== Tracks 6–12 ===
Baker thought that "Brainstorm Interlude" was the Verve "boiling over and freaking out. There are great moments but they’re bobbing in a sea of frantic noodling. It sounds like they were jamming to try and find a song, one didn’t appear but the resulting chaos was too good to ignore." "Drive You Home" is a country ballad in the vein of A Storm in Heaven's closing track, "See You in the Next One (Have a Good Time)", which Jonathan Cohen of Cleveland Scene found to be reminiscent of the work of Chris Isaak. Baker saw it as a slow-tempo track that he felt lasted longer than it needed to, "perhaps suggesting to some that they might be running out of ideas."

Baker thought that "History" did not fit on the album, suggesting that it would have been more beneficial on the band's third studio album, Urban Hymns (1997). Baker said it was an important track in their career, marking the first occasion where strings served as one of the defining characteristics of their recordings. The strings were arranged by Wil Malone, known at the time for contributing to "Unfinished Sympathy" (1991) by Massive Attack. (Note: Baker said that there was a time period where Malone's "strings, or strings in his style, became almost a cliché as grubby indie bands sought them out for a touch of class. They worked brilliantly on 'History'", though McCabe complained later that the arrangement was too posh-sounding.) Egan saw the track as the "most profound song the band had recorded to date, it was a story of loss and loneliness on an epic scale; painfully honest lyric set to a sublime melody and backed by swooning strings." Ashcroft said when he entered the studio, he had part of a melody that would eventually evolve into "History". When they attempted to record it at 3 a.m., the "whole six and a half minutes came out [of me] as one big flood," adding that he did not need to change any of it. By 6 a.m., he noticed a gardener outside the building shaking a matchbox and had him perform on it. Clarke said it was lyrically about the demise of his long-term relationship, proposing that it was "perhaps the most lyrically direct Richard had ever been." Ashcroft explained that it was composed by a person who "sat down and thought about things. Who's gone through the classic stage of a few weeks gettin' pissed up and goin' down to those pits, listening to Big Star at six in the morning. I think [...] I hadn't given up on love."

On "No Knock on My Door", Ashcroft imitates the vocal style of Liam Gallagher; Baker said the comparison was so strong that the listener could picture Ashcroft matching Gallagher's typical stance of being "slightly too far from the mic, leaning over it with his hands behind his back, shouting to make himself heard. The machismo that John Best talked about is in full-effect but you can hear him expending his last drop of strength." Williams, meanwhile, thought that Ashcroft was doing a satisfactory "impression of Shaun Ryder in a launderette as raw riffs lurch and destroy around him."

Baker noted that for the remainder of the album, the energy of the songs drops. "Life's an Ocean" sees a man with a soul living in a soulless society; as Egan wrote, the character's humanity is taken from him via constant commercialism. One of its verses was influenced by the band touring across the US. Ashcroft said that following six weeks in the country, he was unable to look at any advertisements as he could not work out who they were selling to, remarking that it was alarming. He added that the song served as a Stanley Kubrick-esque vision into the future with a man who is "at the end of this emotional tether." King said that when making this song, Ashcroft was exhausted to the point where he had dreams of being tormented by needing to purchase emotions from vending machines. Cohen said it starts with a "funky, Luscious Jackson-esque rhythm" that is followed by McCabe's wah-wah-effected guitar parts partway into the song.

Baker felt that "Stormy Clouds" continues the same theme as "Life's an Ocean", though conveying it in a better way: "drifting in a dreamlike fashion before the rhythm section subtly accelerates, pulling the song forward like a tractor dragging a sports car off a muddy field." King wrote that the album nears its end on a moment of fatigued realisation, seeing the "'new horizons' behind the 'Stormy Clouds' and its winding down instrumental reprise, where McCabe unfurls a soul-searching" guitar solo for six minutes, reminiscent of "May This Be Love" (1967) by Hendrix. For the album's closer, "(Reprise)", Wilding was surprised by McCabe's guitar playing as it took over the rest of the music, altering the "language of its discourse upside down ..." Baker said the track consisted of multiple minutes where they were jamming, which he thought was proof that the tired Verve appear to "have absolutely no idea how to finish the fantastic work they’d started."

== Artwork ==
Cannon handled the sleeve concept, design, and art direction of the album, while Michael Spencer Jones did the photography. In addition to this, two additional photographs were taken by Scarlet Page and Mary Scanlon, who took images dubbed "The Verve on the bus" and "The Verve in the café", respectively. Baker thought the front cover image was indicative of the Verve's new direction, with the four heads placed in front of a black background serving as a reference to the cover for With the Beatles (1963) by the Beatles. A small door can be seen in the corner, which Baker said "perhaps represent[ed] the door into their minds." Cannon said he was a huge fan of the Beatles, despite others thinking it was a homage to the video for "Bohemian Rhapsody" (1975) by Queen, such as Egan. They took the image inside of a warehouse, located near the Tower Bridge in London, and projected the photograph of the band, blown up to sixteen metres in height, on a wall. They had Salisbury come in through the doorway.

Cannon explained that they had the members wrapped up in black velvet, leaving only their heads visible. Egan said they wanted to depict the vastness and "three-dimensional qualities" that Cannon could hear in the music. The image of the members was shot on their previous US tour, which Clarke said showed "how ravaged they had become, with all of them looking exhausted and mad-eyed." Journalist Mark Beaumont, in a review for NME, wrote that the shot of a person walking through a door with the image of the band on top "emphasised the hugeness of the more traditional rock music they were making within." Wilding said the back cover of the album sees Jones' face being mirrored in the "chrome facade of the Feelings Machine," a reference to the vending machine lyric found in "Life's an Ocean". Jones is in the process of putting 50 cents into the machine; red levers can be seen below various black-and-white images of faces giving a range of emotions from anger to sorrow. Wilding thought this recalled the artwork of the Who during their concept album phase. The machine was repurposed for the music video for the Verve's "The Drugs Don't Work" (1997).

== Release ==
When recording concluded, McCabe stayed at his mother's house in Wigan while suffering from depression. His mother inquired about his state of mind, and when she would leave the house, he threw and broke items around the place. At the same time, Ashcroft was dealing with the aftereffects of drugs and suffering from psychosis. Spencer Jones said during this period, Ashcroft had a fear of phones, as no one could get in contact with him. Best was concerned for the members as he saw that there was a "problem and I could see that they weren't talking about it", while other co-manager Jane Savage said Ashcroft seemed "more insular", being singled out from the rest of the band because of the music press. In the period following A Storm in Heaven, 1990s culture shifted with the emergence of new lad and Loaded magazine, as well as the continual evolution of football culture. In addition, Britpop became a mainstream movement; Ashcroft said he abstained from watching or listening to music on the TV and radio.

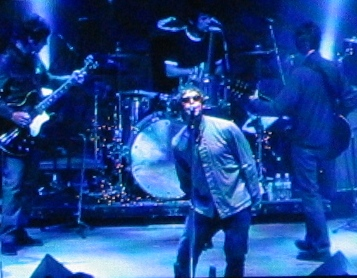
The Verve supported Oasis (pictured in 2005) several times when promoting A Northern Soul.

The Verve played their first show in eight months in Southend-on-Sea on 17 April 1995, supporting Oasis, followed by another show with them in Paris, France, two days later. For the former gig, hype was building around the Verve as critics forecasted that they could become hugely popular. This was intended to be the launch pad for a UK tour, but was cancelled due to McCabe getting into an accident. McCabe was in an altercation with a bouncer at Paris' Bataclan, who would not let him into the backstage area as he did not have a security pass. The bouncer manhandled McCabe, pushed him against a foot, hit him in the face, and kicked him down some stairs. The incident resulted in a broken finger, with it needing to be in a plaster for six weeks; it left him unable to play his guitar. The band had to cancel a month's worth of shows because of this, including four headlining shows and a support slot for Oasis in Sheffield. By this point, comparisons were being increasingly made to Oasis by publications, which frustrated Ashcroft. (Note: During this time, McCabe said he did not know the members of Oasis personally, adding that only Ashcroft did. In the same statement, McCabe made a dig at Ashcroft; Egan commented that "Clearly, there were cracks in The Verve's previously united front, of which McCabe's comment was a rare public expression." Ashcroft was grateful whenever Oasis praised them, since it would have a knock-on effect from Oasis being the biggest band in the country at the time. Though he would have preferred if the Verve's music was being noticed on its own merits by the public and the press instead of through another act.)

In June 1995, the Verve restarted their UK tour in Manchester, with support from Pusherman; it included a headlining spot at the Heineken Music Festival. Over the next few months, friendships deteriorated further, partially due to McCabe being unhappy. Despite having successful shows, he tried to find faults in every one; when they appeared at the Glastonbury Festival, his amp blew up. Ashcroft played maracas to compensate before it was in working order. A Northern Soul was released on 3 July 1995 through Hut Records and in the US through Vernon Yard Recordings. After a one-off show in Newcastle, the Verve supported Oasis in Scotland and then performed at the Phoenix Festival. Following this, they embarked on a US tour, dubbed Conquering America, through early August 1995. Here, they were represented by Ted Gardner of Larrikin Management. In the press, Ashcroft remained positive about the stint, despite the issues during the previous one. The trek was supported by Hum and included a performance at the Cincinnati Riverfest. McCabe was not happy with how the band was doing in the US, wishing that their label was making more effort to help them when compared to the UK, where they were gaining traction.

The situation between the members came to a head when they performed at T in the Park in August 1995, where Ashcroft reportedly seemed ill, blundering across the stage, hitting Salisbury, and throwing parts of his drum kit around. Best said that when they got into the tour bus, Ashcroft remarked that it would be the last show they played, announcing his departure from the band. Aside from the mental strain, Ashcroft was also having physical issues, such as a glandular virus, admitting that "maybe I wasn't in a fit state of mind to be making massive decisions, but that's the way it was and everyone agreed." Best recounted that there was silence upon hearing this; Jones said that everyone involved was unhappy with the music, though he considered the situation to be an argument rather than a breakup, and only grew into a split due to how it was reported, such as by The Hard Report. McCabe admitted in 1997 that it was because of him "being a miserable bastard, basically." (Note: Within two weeks of this event, Ashcroft started collaborating with Jones and Salisbury again. Bake said this made people think that the supposed breakup was nothing more than a method to get McCabe out of the band. McCabe himself said they outright sacked him, reasoning they "got sick of my fucking sad face all the time. I just got paranoid about everything.")

Best proposed that McCabe was not satisfied with the music they had been making, as he was discovering techno and experimenting with samplers and synthesizers. In a statement issued by PR company Savage and Best, Ashcroft was unhappy with the lack of glowing reception from their recent touring. The recording sessions for A Northern Soul reportedly also contributed to Ashcroft's decision. Best said the rest of the band were disillusioned about the circumstances; in retrospect, he said he was oblivious about it, despite the members living in different towns from one another. Best also mentioned that they almost split in the midst of the album's sessions, during a turbulent period when Ashcroft walked out of the recording studio. Three months worth of shows were cancelled, including more gigs supporting Oasis and headlining treks across Japan and mainland Europe. Egan said that as the Verve were no longer active, seemingly all the music reviewers and the public confessed their love of the band. This sentiment was further heightened when Oasis' second album, (What's the Story) Morning Glory? (1995), came out, featuring the song "Cast No Shadow", which had a dedication to Ashcroft in the booklet. (Note: Egan noted that its melody was similar to that of "On Your Own"'s B-side, "I See the Door". Ashcroft later remarked that he had never asked Noel Gallagher about the subject of "Cast No Shadow". Egan said (What's the Story) Morning Glory? included what he thought was "another implicit nod to Ashcroft and his band – the heavy string sections which proliferated on the album recalling the orchestration on 'History'." John Harris, in his book The Last Party: Britpop, Blair and the Demise of English Rock (2003), wrote that given the relationship between Oasis and the Verve, there was minimal ambiguity that "History" was an influence on Oasis' "Wonderwall" (1995), suggesting that the listener "only need play them back-to-back to hear it.")

A Northern Soul was re-pressed on vinyl in 2016, 2019, and 2023. In 2016, an expanded version of the album was issued, including B-sides, EP tracks, outtakes, and BBC Radio 1 session material. "This Is Music", "On Your Own", and "History" were included on the band's second compilation album, This Is Music: The Singles 92–98 (2004), while music videos for both were featured on the video album of the same name.

=== Singles ===
"This Is Music" was released as a single on 1 May 1995, with "Let the Damage Begin" and "You and Me" as its B-sides. Cannon interpreted the song as a preacher ranting, and as such, for the artwork, Ashcroft is seen wearing a sandwich board with the lyrics printed on it. The music video was directed by Nico Beyer.

"On Your Own" was released as a single on 12 June 1995, with "I See the Door", "Little Gem", and "Dance on Your Bones" as its B-sides. "On Your Own" was issued to modern rock radio stations in the US in early June 1995. The artwork features a man named B, a friend of the band, riding on an abandoned merry-go-round. Ilic said the video for "On Your Own" contains a "host of freakish extras, cavorting through an artificial scene of beautifully photographed lush fog." It was directed by Jake Scott; the assistant director was Spencer Leigh, whom the band knew when he was an actor in the 1980s. Scott centred the video around the film Amarcord (1973), an idea that he wanted to do for some years but did not have the right song until he heard "On Your Own". It was filmed in the Hollywood Centre and featured a Napoleon doppelganger and a transgender person alongside animals, namely a dog, a horse, and a peacock.

"History" was released as the third single from the album on 18 September 1995. Two versions were released on CD with different B-sides: one with "Grey Skies" and "Life's Not a Rehearsal", while the other had "Back on My Feet", an acoustic rendition of "On Your Own", a remix of "Monkey Magic", and an edit of "History". Ashcroft directed the music video for "History". It dawned on Ashcroft, who got emotional when he heard the song on the radio, that a tour behind the single would have significantly helped their career. Jones was similarly upset about not being able to get the rewards from it.

== Contemporary reviews ==
Original release
Review scores
Source	Rating
Entertainment Weekly	C
The Guardian	3/5 stars
NME	6/10
Q	4/5 stars
Select	5/5

A Northern Soul was met with critical acclaim in both the UK and the US; Egan said some reviewers acknowledged the album's musical depth, while Beaumont said others focused on the highly personal nature of the lyrics.

A few critics said it evoked the sound of Oasis. The staff at Music Week made it album of the week, writing: "Having resurfaced in the shadow of Oasis, The Verve sound like the former's older brothers with their strident yet studied rock songs. Don't overlook it." Laura Lee Davies of Time Out called the album a "limbered, slack-mouthed, musical masterpiece which brings together the wiped-out, guitar-gorged promise of the Wigan outfit's first album and a post-Happy Mondays/Stone Roses snarl and contemporary spirit which Oasis captured to such staggering commercial effect last year." She saw it difficult for Oasis to come "close to such stream-of-genius rock on their follow-up album." Around one-third of Andrew Perry's review in Select consisted of comparisons between Oasis and the Verve. He said the Verve were musically on "another planet altogether. Like early U2, Bunnymen or Waterboys, they're after a Big Music that knows no horizons. It often seems like theatre, with Ashcroft as the leading player, howling off-mike, pulling wacko faces and flapping his arms like a loony, but that's just down to the sheer dynamic aspirations of the band behind him."

A handful focused on the lyrics and the album's concept. Eccleston pointed out the changing aspect of Ashcroft's lyrical themes, as the "former away-with-the-faeries act" was "brought down to earth by the thematic one-two of death and desertion." Cohen said the album "runs the gamut of life experience and should further elevate the Verve to superstar status in the United States." Perry praised the concept, saying that it "weaves a series of narratives and dialogues that, in the process, lure you into the thrall of their drama." Davies found fault with the album's thematic framing, reassuring listeners not to "let the distant echo of the 'concept' album alarm you [...] as it was an old-fashioned modern classic." Williams mocked the album's concept, saying that the band's "dogged pursuit of utter, preposterous, po-faced perfection has always impressed the most. It's the urgency, the drive, the gaping mouths, the Droopy-Dawg-stoners-storming-the-barricades-of-the-banal script."

Many reviewers praised the music. Eccleston described the album as "[r]aging whirlpool rock from Wigan's aspiring starsailors, with a dense, warm sound superseding the shiny surfaces of their John Leckie-produced and FX-swamped début". The Guardian reviewer Caroline Sullivan described this as a "major refurbishment" of the band's sound and reassured listeners that this was "not the bad news it sounds. A Northern Soul was stitched together with considerable delicacy, making it as much use of little oases of quiet as it does of the empire-building guitar of Nick McCabe." The staff of The Post and Courier suggest that A Northern Soul is what Second Coming (1994) by the Stone Roses was meant to sound like: "high-grade British rock of the post-Manchester Scene variety. True to its name, the group indeed shows a lot of verve and, unlike the Stone Roses, they deliver the goods with precious little pomp but plenty of circumstance, musically speaking." SF Weekly's Jeff Stark acknowledged that it can be difficult for bands to "live up to a hype factory that equates your work to the second coming, names you heir to The Stone Roses' already waning legacy and champions you as the only contemporary chaps that band du jour will plug in interviews. But when the first loop of Richard Ashcroft's croon wraps on 'This Is Music', there's every indication that this will be just as dynamic and psychedelic as any previous work."

Other critics were mixed about the music. The Times's David Sinclair said that several of the tracks appear to begin by "sliding in halfway through a studio jam, and most of the tracks drift well past the five-minute mark without ending up any significant disturbance from where they started." Williams said, "It's the fact that nine of these 12 tracks cruise past the five minute mark with splendid non-chalance. It's the fact that The Verve have always been ragingly, rockingly, rompingly ridiculous." CMJ New Music Monthly writer Bob Gulla said it was an "undisciplined mess much of the time, but a beautiful one, with buckets of hippy freakout spirit and musical adventure." Peter Galvin of Entertainment Weekly went more critical, writing that the guitar "riffs huff and puff in search of a hook, the lyrics repeat the same banal motifs over and over. Lacking a substantial artistic vision, the Verve creates a musical sound and fury that signifies nothing." Andy Gill at The Independent lambasted the album, saying it was the audio "equivalent of crushed velvet flares sagging over scuffed plimsoles", adding that hearing the album was "undoubtedly the longest hour of my life so far." He said the band incorporated the "worst aspects of both the progressive guitar rock that is their clearest historical precedent, and the baggy scene that was current at their inception: sluggish and preposterously self-indulgent".

== Retrospective reviews ==
Retrospective reviews
Review scores
Source	Rating
AllMusic	4.5/5 stars
Drowned in Sound	10/10
Encyclopedia of Popular Music	4/5 stars
Gigwise	9/10 stars
The Line of Best Fit	9/10
Mojo	4/5 stars
PopMatters	9/10 stars
Record Collector	4/5 stars
Rolling Stone Germany	3.5/5 stars
The Rolling Stone Album Guide	4/5 stars

Retrospective reviews commented on the music of A Northern Soul. Journalist Rob Sheffield in The New Rolling Stone Album Guide said it "kicked home with the gorgeous breakup ballad 'On Your Own' and the epic 'History,' [...] It was their breakthrough, and the Verve celebrated by splitting up almost immediately." Radhika Takru of Drowned in Sound was unable to deny the maturity the album had, sporting a wider range of emotions compared to the Verve's debut. She noted their expertise and authority of the music; she said A Northern Soul was "not as personal, and far more guarded and reflective than its predecessor which sits young, loud and reckless." Hogwood saw it as "far from comfortable music, made at the peak of the band’s overindulgence and prodigious drug taking." The Line of Best Fit's Ed Nash said Ashcroft was setting himself up as a notable songwriter, however, Nash took issue with Ashcroft's ballads, as they gave minimal space for McCabe's cavernous guitar sounds, "Something had to give and it was the guitarist." Record Collector writer Tim Peacock said the album was a traditional, focused rock album that got bogged "down by Ashcroft’s plaintive existential angst." Childs said the album was a "testament to giving up and restarting just to discover you then want to give up again. [...] The album’s content could be a paean reflecting the band’s doubt [...] the cold chorus of perhaps dark days ahead." Beaumont, in a review for Classic Rock, commented that despite its troubled production, the album was remarkably cohesive and, aside from the infrequent extended psychedelic passage, A Northern Soul was a turbulent progression "from the band least likely to stay together long enough to own the 90s." For Rolling Stone Germany, journalist Sassan Niasseri said that with the album, the band displayed their "rather strenuous Led Zeppelin homage, tank driver rock."

Biographers were impressed by the quality of the music on A Northern Soul, despite its troubled production. Baker thought it was not as cohesive as its predecessor, though its "best moments would be among the best moments of 1995. They’d flown far away from their roots in obscure space rock and now they had songs that they could proudly put alongside the classic tunes of their youth." He felt that it had a "very uneven feel" steaming from the mixing of emotional ballads such as "On Your Own" and the A Storm in Heaven-esque "So It Goes". "It’s not an album that flows smoothly." Ilic said the album was "flowing with warm, dense and powerful overtones. McCabe's flamboyant electrics were stamped all over it, but sounded especially blissful on 'Brainstorm Interlude' and 'Drive You Home'. It marked a distinct change from the freeform sculpture of their first album, and lyrically the fantasy-based songs had also veered towards the richer realms of Ashcroft's personal experiences." Clarke noted that it was "full of their trademark swirling guitars, huge rock themes and meandering, sprawling songs", and to him, it was substantially superior to the band's older work, being "richer in lyrical thought and musical texture, and easily their most accomplished project to date." He added that with the addition of sweeping string sections and "ethereal guitar work, it was also a much classier record", going on to highlight Ashcroft's direction in both his vocal parts and lyrics. Wilding wrote that the album was more plaintive in its approach when compared to their debut album, finding it "nothing short of heroic. Twelve heady, soulful tracks that wouldn't have looked amiss on some Led Zeppelin compilation." Wilding added that if you match that with Ashcroft putting the "lyrical spotlight on himself and you had an album that, due to the fact that the band imploded before they could show the world just his lustrous their record might be, would fall through the net."

== Commercial performance and accolades ==
A Northern Soul peaked at number 13 in the UK Albums Chart, selling more in its first month of release than A Storm in Heaven had done in the two years since its release. Despite this, it fell under the band's expectations. Its 2016 reissue re-entered the chart at number 80. The album was certified silver and gold in the UK by the British Phonographic Industry (BPI) in 1997 and 1998, respectively. "This Is Music" peaked at number 35 in the UK. "On Your Own" peaked at number 28 in the UK. "History" peaked at number 24 in the UK.

Melody Maker, NME, and Select all included the album on their 1995 best of the year lists. Noel Gallagher and Robert Plant of Led Zeppelin praised A Northern Soul, with the former calling it the third-best album of the year. It was ranked by author Colin Larkin at number 289 in the All Time Top 1000 Albums (2000) and by NME at number 390 on their 2013 list of the 500 best albums of all time. PopMatters ranked the 2016 expanded edition of the album, with a similar reissue of A Storm in Heaven, at number 10 on their list of the best 25 re-releases from the year, while Rolling Stone included the two sets on their unranked list. Pappademas considered A Northern Soul one of 10 essential Britpop albums, while Musikexpress and Pitchfork included the album in the top 30 of their best Britpop album lists.

== Legacy ==
Baker said for the majority of listeners, the album was remembered for a single track, "History", which was the "moment The Verve took a giant step towards popular acclaim but it was also symbolic – in more ways than one – of a band that were falling apart. Richard was starting to discover himself as a songwriter and the rest of the band could have been forgiven for thinking they were now almost surplus to requirements as he came up with the initial germ of the idea." Baker found it astonishing how the album was disregarded by music press outlets and BBC Radio One, yet listeners that did not understand the "power and fury of ‘This Is Music’ or ‘A New Decade’ couldn't help but respond to ‘History’. Unfortunately, though, most mainstream music fans never got to hear it or even read about it." (Note: Ashcroft saw A Northern Soul as a classic album and was unable to comprehend why it was being ignored by the public and press outlets, comparing it alongside other albums at the time, such as The Bends (1995) by Radiohead. Baker said that album was also ignored upon its release, while Ashcroft said it did not hold up against A Northern Soul: "[Radiohead are] a fabulous band and they've got great songs but if you're looking for real rock 'n' roll, hip-hop psychedelic madness, which fuses all this stuff ... A Northern Soul to me was like our Revolver [by the Beatles]." Both Radiohead and the Verve were considered too dark-sounding to achieve any widespread success when they were against the likes of "Country House" (1995) by Blur and "Roll with It" (1995) by Oasis.) Ashcroft also pointed out the lack of radio support and bemoaning promotion from magazines. While McCabe did not get along with Morris, unlike the rest of the band, he praised the final, finished work. Out of everyone they worked with previously, he said Morris was the closest to closing the gap between the band's live and studio sounds.

The Verve returned to the sound of A Northern Soul on "Neon Wilderness" from Urban Hymns, which acted as a counterpart to "Brainstorm Interlude". Luke Haines of labelmates the Auteurs said the success of A Northern Soul prompted higher-ups at Virgin to push him to release a commercial-sounding album with hit singles on it, resulting in How I Learned to Love the Bootboys (1999). Members of the Hiss expressed admiration for A Northern Soul; because of Morris' role on that album, they enlisted him for their album Panic Movement (2003).

== Track listing ==
All songs written by the Verve. All tracks produced by Owen Morris and the band.

No.	Title	Length
1.	"A New Decade"	4:12
2.	"This Is Music"	3:35
3.	"On Your Own"	3:34
4.	"So It Goes"	6:11
5.	"A Northern Soul"	6:32
6.	"Brainstorm Interlude"	5:11
7.	"Drive You Home"	6:41
8.	"History"	5:26
9.	"No Knock on My Door"	5:11
10.	"Life's an Ocean"	5:44
11.	"Stormy Clouds"	5:34
12.	"(Reprise)"	6:11
Total length:		64:02

== Personnel ==
Personnel per booklet, except where noted.

The Verve

- Nick McCabe – guitars, piano (tracks 3 and 11), twelve-string guitar (track 3), acoustic guitar (tracks 4 and 11), Hammond organ (track 4), Moog (track 11)
- Richard Ashcroft – vocals, percussion (tracks 2, 4, 8, and 10), acoustic guitar (tracks 3, 4, 8, and 11), electric piano (track 9)
- Simon Jones – bass, percussion (track 1), keyboards (track 5), twelve-string acoustic guitar (track 8)
- Peter Salisbury – drums, percussion (tracks 1, 2, 4, 8, and 10)

Additional musicians

- Owen Morris – Hammond organ (track 6), string arrangement (track 8), synthesized strings (track 8)
- Will Malone – string arrangement (track 8)
- Gavyn Wright – strings (track 8)
- The London Session Orchestra – strings (track 8)
- Liam Gallagher – handclaps (track 8)

Production and design

- Owen Morris – producer
- The Verve – producer
- Mark Lee – studio assistant
- Jack Adams – mastering
- Brian Cannon – sleeve concept, design, art direction
- Michael Spencer Jones – photography
- Scarlet Page – The Verve on the bus photograph
- Mary Scanlon – The Verve in the café photograph

== Charts and certifications ==
=== Weekly charts ===
1995 chart performance for A Northern Soul
Chart (1995)	Peak position
Scottish Albums (Official Charts)	24
UK Albums (Official Charts)	13

2016 chart performance for A Northern Soul
Chart (2016)	Peak position
Belgian Albums (Ultratop Wallonia)	102

=== Certifications ===
Certifications for A Northern Soul
Region	Certification	Certified units/sales
United Kingdom (BPI)	Gold	100,000^{^}
^{^} Shipments figures based on certification alone.

== See also ==
- Modern Life Is Rubbish – the 1993 album by contemporary act Blur after they switched from shoegaze to Britpop
- Lovelife – the 1996 album by contemporary act Lush after they switched from shoegaze to Britpop
