= Voyager 1 (EP) =

EP by Verve
- Released: 1993
- Recorded: 1992 in London and New York City
- Genres: Psychedelic rock, shoegazing, noise pop
- Length: 35:55
- Label: Jolly Roger
- Producer: Unknown

Verve chronology
A Storm in Heaven (1993)	Voyager 1 (1993)	No Come Down (1994)

Professional ratings
Review scores
Source	Rating
AllMusic	3/5 stars

Voyager 1 is a live EP by British group The Verve (at the time known as Verve), released only in the United States in March 1993. For Record Store Day 2025, the album received a vinyl reissue mastered from the original analog sources with lacquers cut by Geoff Pesche at Abbey Road Studios.

== Album details ==
The album was recorded live in London and New York City during 1992. Four of the six tracks appear on other Verve albums or EPs, those being "Gravity Grave" and "She's a Superstar" on Verve EP; and "Slide Away", "One Way to Go" and "Already There" on A Storm in Heaven.

Only 1000 clear blue vinyl copies were pressed, making it a collector's item. However, 300 of the copies were ruined in transit from Britain to the United States, making this even rarer. As of 1 January 2016, three of them can be bought online on amazon.com, the highest priced at $10,000. Several third-party websites also have the digital version, selling at various costs. It was confirmed on Twitter by Brian Cannon of Microdot on 16 January 2022 that the release was indeed an official release put out by Hut Recordings, made to appear like a bootleg. Brian's thumbprint and the letter M can be found on the rear of the sleeve.

The album was re-released on vinyl for the first time on Record Store Day 2025.

== Tracks that were never released as singles ==
=== "One Way to Go" ===
"One Way to Go" was featured as a B-side to "All in the Mind", The Verve's first ever single release, in 1992. The song remained in the band's playlist for only a short period, being dropped before the Gravity Grave Tour of October 1992.

=== "South Pacific" ===
"South Pacific" was a song that received favourable reviews, akin to "an ocean crashing down about your ears" . The song remained in their live set for a long while, still being performed at the start of the Paris tour. It was also performed live at Camden Town Hall . A previously unreleased studio version, recorded at Sawmills Studios, was released in the 2016 box set reissue of their A Storm In Heaven album, and studio footage from that session was included in the DVD of the box set and uploaded to their YouTube channel.

=== "Already There" ===
"Already There" was recorded in the studio in 1993 for the album A Storm in Heaven. The song is very "hazy" and psychedelic, with Richard Ashcroft's voice synthetically altered and the guitars on high distortion.

== Track listing ==
No.	Title	Length
1.	"Slide Away"	6:02
2.	"Gravity Grave"	8:26
3.	"One Way to Go"	5:58
4.	"South Pacific"	3:59
5.	"Already There"	4:45
6.	"She's a Superstar"	6:45
Total length:		35:55
