= She's a Superstar =

1992 single by the Verve

Single by Verve
- B-side: "Feel"
- Released: 22 June 1992
- Studio: The Manor, Oxfordshire, England
- Length: 8:56; 5:03 (edit)
- Label: Hut
- Songwriters: Nick McCabe; Richard Ashcroft; Simon Jones; Peter Salisbury
- Producer: Barry Clempson

Verve singles chronology
"All in the Mind" (1992)	"She's a Superstar" (1992)	"Gravity Grave" (1992)

"She's a Superstar" is a song by the English rock band Verve. It was released as the band's second single on 22 June 1992. It reached number 66 on the UK Singles Chart and topped the Independent Singles Chart. "She's a Superstar" and "Feel" were recorded at The Manor Studio in Oxfordshire, England with producer Barry Clempson.

Verve promoted "She's a Superstar" with a headlining tour of the UK in July 1992. The cover of the single was taken on Snake Pass, Derbyshire, England; a music video was shot for this song in Thor's Cave, Staffordshire.

== Background and recording ==
Verve released their debut single "All in the Mind" on 9 March 1992. It received generally favourable reviews, and topped the Independent Singles Chart in the UK. They promoted it with a dozen shows supporting Ride, followed by a support slot for Spiritualized on their tour. Alongside the wider exposure Verve were receiving, the trek marked a change for the band, with them taking influence from Spiritualized in their performances. In between dates of the tour, Verve supported Ride again for a one-off show at the Brixton Academy, and headlined a show at the Powerhaus, in London.

"She's a Superstar" was recorded at The Manor Studio, close to Oxfordshire, England. Barry Clempson, known for his work with Spiritualized, was picked to produce the sessions. Up to that point, the band had been performing "She's a Superstar" live, but by the time they worked with Clempson, the song had a slower tempo. Egan wrote that when the band was recording it, the song had reached four-minutes in length, and while they kept playing, their "ever-present penchant for improvisational methods took over."

Virgin Records staff member Miles Leonard said the band experimented during this session, such as recording "Feel" inside an indoor swimming pool, which gave the gave the song its echoey atmosphere. The track was recorded across three or four days, with sessions lasting midnight to 10am the following morning as Clempson preferred working at night. Egan said that due to the time they were working on it, the band and Clempson associated the song with the sun rising and birds chirping. Ashcroft felt that both tracks were more in line with their live performances, in contrast to when they worked on "All in the Mind" and its associated tracks.

== Composition ==
Baker said "She's a Superstar" displayed a country music influence, courtesy of McCabe's slide guitar parts, "but they were far more distorted and otherworldly than any 'normal' country record." While the track continues, Bake commented that it "keeps sounding like it's about to explode with long wails of feedback and moments with a much rockier sound. Then it dives downwards again as Richard emotes dreamily over the top." (Note: Baker said when they performed the track live in later years, Ashcroft's voice would rest higher in the audio mix. Via the slide guitar, Bake saw a resemblance to one of the band's later songs, "The Drugs Don't Work" (1997): "It even suggests what 'The Drugs Don't Work' might have sounded like if Nick McCabe had been involved.") Clarke noted the "subtle but weird guitar work" from McCabe, adding that the song was possibly their "first true sign of potential greatness, telling tales of high-life, drug-taking and exploitative love, and ending with an extra six minutes of wild, free-form feedback-filled jamming." He compared the lyrics to those in "Never Lose That Feeling" (1992) by Swervedriver and "Blue Room" by the Orb. "Feel" lasts for over 10 minutes; Steve Sutherland of Melody Maker remarked that the track came across as a "space mantra", evolving akin to material from Spiritualized "in some blasted far-flung region of the universe."

== Artwork ==
Baker said the band influenced Cannon to push his abilities for what can be done for a record sleeve for "She's a Superstar". The artwork, which was shot in March 1992, has a waterfall cascading over a hillside, with streams of it splashing down a neon sign that reads "Verve". The four band members are visible albeit as dots in the distance. Cannon said he thought of the waterfall concept. He had driven with the band to the Pennines, as the shoot was held at Snake Pass in Derbyshire, England. The neon sign was manufactured in Manchester and transported to Cannon in Derbyshire. The waterfall itself measured six feet in height, though it appears akin to 30 feet. Cannon was located up the stream with a bin of blue food colouring that he dumped into the river to enhance the blue shading of the water. He had the band members stand in the distance as he toyed with the bin. As they did not have mobile phones, him and the others communicated using sign language.

== Release and reception ==
Clempson was content that Hut Records did not balk at the uncommercial aspect of the "She's a Superstar"'s length. The label was indifferent about presenting the band as a singles-orientated act. Despite this, an edited version of the song, cut down to five-and-a-half minutes, was prepared with Clempson in attendance. Egan said the band and Clempson wanted it to retain the dynamic of quiet verses and loud choruses. "She's a Superstar" released as a single on 22 June 1992. The video for "She's a Superstar" was shot at Thor's Cave in Warwickshire, which would feature on the cover for their debut studio album, A Storm in Heaven (1993). Preceded by a one-off show in London in June 1992, the band embarked on their first headlining tour the following month to promote "She’s a Superstar".

An expanded version of A Storm in Heaven was issued in 2016, which included "She's a Superstar" and "Feel". The band were so enthusiastic about the cover artwork that they used an alternative image for the artwork of their compilation album This Is Music: The Singles 92–98 (2004). The edit of "She's a Superstar" was included on it, while the music video for the song was featured on the video album of the same name. The edit was also included on The Verve E.P., intended for the US market, in December 1992. A live recording the song was featured on the Voyager 1 EP, released in early 1993.

Sutherland made "She's a Superstar" Single of the Week, where he wrote that the people who had seen the song live would notice the change in tempo, "Then you'll be intrigued. There's stuff going on here, subtle stuff, weird guitar stuff, stuff you really have to listen hard to hear. Then you'll be entranced... Not many bands are brave/foolish enough to do what Verve have done. Some folks are calling it commercial suicide." AllMusic reviewer Jason Ankeny saw the single as the "quintessential Verve record. Over the course of the two epic tracks which comprise this EP, the band truly comes into its own", going on to praise the individual members' contributions to the song.

"She's a Superstar" topped the Independent Singles Chart and appeared on the main UK Singles Chart at number 66.

== Track listings ==
12-inch vinyl and CD track listing

1. "She's a Superstar" – 8:56
2. "Feel" – 10:42

7-inch vinyl track listing

1. "She's a Superstar" (edit) – 5:03
2. "Feel" – 10:42

== Charts ==
Chart performance for "She's a Superstar"
Chart (1992)	Peak position
UK Independent Singles Chart	1
