= No Come Down =

1994 compilation album by the Verve

Compilation album by The Verve
- Released: 16 May 1994
- Recorded: 1993–1994
- Genre: Psychedelic rock
- Length: 44:12
- Label: Vernon Yard, Hut
- Producer: The Verve, John Leckie, Paul Schroeder, Nick Green, William Smith, Barry Clempson

The Verve chronology
| Voyager 1 (1993) | No Come Down (1994) | A Northern Soul (1995) |

Professional ratings
Review scores
| Source | Rating |
|---|---|
| AllMusic | 3/5 stars |
| Head Heritage | (positive) |
| Loaded | (mixed) |

No Come Down is a compilation album of B-sides and outtakes by English rock band The Verve, released on 16 May 1994 on Vernon Yard and Hut Recordings. It was the first release on which the original band's name Verve was changed to The Verve. For Record Store Day 2024, the album received a vinyl reissue to mark its 30th anniversary.

== Overview ==
"No Come Down", "Where the Geese Go", "Twilight", and "Six O'Clock" are outtakes from the sessions for the group's first album, A Storm in Heaven, and first appeared on B-sides to singles from that album. "Blue" is presented in a different (vocally upfront) "USA Mix" – released to coincide with Verve's participation in Lollapalooza. Another outtake from the band's debut album is an earlier and folkier alternate version of "Make It 'Til Monday". The "acoustic" version of "Butterfly" is actually the same take as the album version but without the lead electric guitar overdubs and with a different, earlier vocal. "One Way to Go" predates the rest of the songs on the album and is taken from the B-side to the band's first single, "All in the Mind" (it was omitted the Verve's first US release, Verve EP). "Gravity Grave" is also of a slightly earlier vintage, with the version included here having been recorded live at Glastonbury Festival. This version of "Gravity Grave" is closer to the protracted single release than it is to the earlier US EP version.

== Track listing ==
All tracks are written by The Verve.

| No. | Title | Length |
|---|---|---|
| 1. | "No Come Down" | 3:14 |
| 2. | "Blue" (USA Mix) | 3:15 |
| 3. | "Make It Till Monday" (acoustic version) | 2:44 |
| 4. | "Butterfly" (acoustic version) | 7:36 |
| 5. | "Where the Geese Go" | 3:12 |
| 6. | "6 O'Clock" | 4:29 |
| 7. | "One Way to Go" | 7:16 |
| 8. | "Gravity Grave" (live at Glastonbury, 1993) | 9:22 |
| 9. | "Twilight" | 3:01 |
| Total length: | | 44:12 |

- Tracks 1, 5 and 9 are taken from "Blue", released in 1993.
- Track 2 is taken from "Blue (US)", released in 1994.
- Tracks 3 and 6 are taken from "Slide Away", released in 1993.
- Track 7 is taken from "All in the Mind", released in 1992.

== Charts ==
Chart performance for No Come Down
| Chart (2024) | Peak position |
|---|---|
| Scottish Albums (OCC) | 33 |
