= Good Times (magazine) =

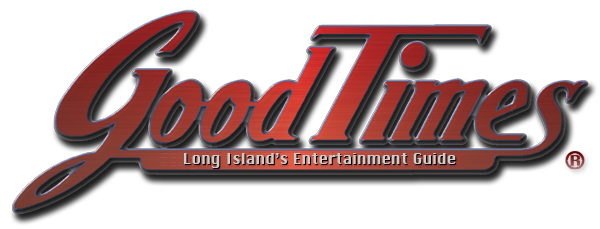

Good Times Magazine is a music and entertainment newspaper in Long Island, New York. Founded in 1969 by Richard Branciforte in an effort to get free tickets to Woodstock, the paper became the Long Island musician's bible in the 1970s and 1980s, publishing interviews with Bruce Springsteen and Duane Allman among others. Good Times Magazine is America's oldest regional entertainment newspaper.

Good Times has primarily focused on the Long Island scene, publishing interviews and reviews of local musicians.

Good Times alumni include writers such as MTV's Kurt Loder, Rolling Stone's David Fricke and Entertainment Weekly's Leonard Maltin. Their current columns and columnists are The Sports Beat with Lloyd Carroll, The Dungeon (Heavy Metal) with Dave Wolff and Rhythm Tracking with Jimi LaLumia.

In 2006, Good Times re-launched their website and an interactive discussion board known as the Good Times Music Blog.
