= Panic Movement (album) =

Studio album by the Hiss
- Released: August 11, 2003
- Recorded: February 2002
- Genre: Garage rock
- Length: 41:52
- Label: Loog; Sanctuary
- Producer: Owen Morris

The Hiss chronology
| Panic Movement (2003) | Chocolate Hearts (2007) |

Professional ratings
Review scores
| Source | Rating |
|---|---|
| AllMusic | 3/5 stars |

Panic Movement is the first release by indie/garage rock band the Hiss. It was released in August 2003 by Loog Records and is distributed throughout America by Sanctuary Records. The song "Back on the Radio" was featured in Tony Hawk's Underground 2, and the first single "Triumph" entered the UK top 20. Some enhanced copies on the Sanctuary Records release have 2 bonus videos.

== Track listing ==
1. "Clever Kicks" – 2:23
2. "Triumph" – 4:08
3. "Listen to Me" – 4:15
4. "Back on the Radio" – 4:12
5. "Not for Hire" – 5:10
6. "Riverbed" – 2:29
7. "Ghost's Gold" – 6:27
8. "Lord's Prayer" – 2:42
9. "Hard to Lose" – 4:03
10. "Step Aside" – 3:49
11. "Brass Tacks" – 3:11
12. "City People" – 3:03
