= On Your Own (The Verve song) =

1995 single by the Verve

Single by the Verve

from the album A Northern Soul
- B-side: "I See the Door"; "Little Gem"; "Dance on Your Bones"
- Released: 12 June 1995
- Studio: Loco (Wales)
- Genre: Alternative rock
- Length: 3:34
- Label: Hut
- Songwriters: Nick McCabe; Richard Ashcroft; Simon Jones; Peter Salisbury
- Producers: Owen Morris; The Verve

The Verve singles chronology
"This Is Music" (1995)	"On Your Own" (1995)	"History" (1995)

"On Your Own" is a song by the English rock band the Verve from their second album, A Northern Soul (1995). It was released on 12 June 1995 as the album's second single, charting at number 28 on the UK Singles Chart.

== Lyrics ==
The song appears to be based on the work of the Smiths, using some of their techniques, such as adding major sevenths and features a lyric close to the one in "How Soon Is Now?":

"and you stand on your own / and you leave on your own"

compared to the lyric in "On Your Own":

"You come in on your own / and you leave on your own".

Lead singer Richard Ashcroft also recorded an acoustic version of On Your Own that contained only piano and acoustic guitar, in addition to Ashcroft's vocals. The vinyl version is green and includes the B-side "I See the Door". A small number of the green vinyl release were misprinted and featured the track "Friends" by Daryll-Ann. Nearly all misprinted copies were destroyed, making it a highly collectable single.

== Reception ==
AllMusic writer Jason Aneky considered "On Your Own" to be a remarkable song, and a highlight on the album.

== Music video ==
The music video was directed by Jake Scott (son of Ridley Scott) and features the band performing on a foggy street.

== Personnel ==
- Richard Ashcroft: lead vocals, acoustic guitar, handclaps.
- Nick McCabe: lead guitar, acoustic guitar;
- Simon Jones: bass guitar;
- Peter Salisbury: drums;

== Track listings ==
- CD (HUTCD 55)
1. "On Your Own"
2. "I See the Door"
3. "Little Gem"
4. "Dance on Your Bones"
- 7-inch and cassette (HUT 55; HUTC 55)
1. "On Your Own"
2. "I See the Door"

== Release history ==
Region	Date	Format(s)	Label(s)	Ref.
United States	5 June 1995	Alternative radio	Vernon Yard	
United Kingdom	12 June 1995	7-inch vinyl; CD; cassette	Hut	
