= The Hiss =

Five piece rock band from Atlanta, Georgia

- Origin: Atlanta, Georgia, U.S.
- Genres: Alternative rock, indie rock, post-rock, art rock, hard rock, grunge, psychedelic music
- Years active: September 2001–2008
- Labels: Sanctuary Records
- Past members: Johnny Kral; Ian Franco; Adrian Barrera; Todd Galpin; Milton Chapman; George Reese; Mahjula Bah-Kamara
- Website: Thehiss.com

The Hiss was an American five piece rock band from Atlanta, Georgia, United States.

== Career ==
Adrian Barrera and Todd Galpin set their sights on Georgia after a lackluster music career in their home state of Florida. They soon met up with Ian Franco, Milton Chapman and Johnny Kral and formed The Hiss. In March 2003 their self-produced single "Triumph" entered the UK Singles Chart. They have toured the U.S. and Europe with Jet, Oasis and The White Stripes. Their sound is comparable to The Stooges, The Velvet Underground and The Rolling Stones. They have released two full-length studio albums. Some enhanced copies of the album have two music videos on them. They are heavily influenced by surrealism and because of this, might be considered art rock. They released a new LP Chocolate Hearts, all songs written in Atlanta after their recording studio in Florida's Key West area was evacuated because of hurricanes. The band split up in November 2008.

== In popular culture ==
- "Back on the Radio" featured in videogames Tony Hawk's Underground 2 and FlatOut
- "Clever Kicks" featured in videogames NASCAR 2005: Chase for the Cup and Crash 'n' Burn

== Members ==
=== Last formation ===
- Adrian Barrera: Guitar and vocals
- Todd Galpin: Drums
- Milton Chapman: Keyboards and organ
- George Reese: Bass

=== Former members ===
- Ian Franco: Guitar
- Johnny Kral: Bass
- Mahjula Bah-Kamara: Bass

== Discography ==
=== Albums ===
- Panic Movement - 2003 - Sanctuary Records
- Chocolate Hearts - 2007

=== Singles ===
- "Triumph" - 2003 - UK No. 53
- "Clever Kicks" - 2003 - UK No. 49
- "Back On The Radio" - 2003 - UK No. 65

=== Others ===
- The song "Cazzy" was featured in a psychedelic rock compilation album.
- The song "Back On The Radio" was featured in two video games: Flatout and Tony Hawk's Underground 2.
- The song "Clever Kicks" was featured in the video games: NASCAR 2005: Chase for the Cup and NASCAR SimRacing.
- The song "Clever Kicks" was featured in the movie: CATWOMAN.
