= This Is Music =

Single by The Verve

from the album A Northern Soul
- B-side: "Let the Damage Begin", "You and Me"
- Released: 1 May 1995
- Studio: Loco (Wales)
- Genre: Psychedelic rock
- Length: 3:35
- Label: Hut
- Songwriters: Richard Ashcroft, Simon Jones, Peter Salisbury, Nick McCabe
- Producers: Owen Morris, the Verve

The Verve singles chronology
"Slide Away" (1993)	"This Is Music" (1995)	"On Your Own" (1995)

"This Is Music" is a song by the English alternative rock band The Verve. It was released as the first single from their second album, A Northern Soul. The song charted at number 35 in the United Kingdom, making it their Top 40 debut. "This Is Music" featured as the band's opening song for the majority of their 2008 reunion tour. The cover was shot in Leeds, England, by Michael Spencer Jones.

== Reception ==
AllMusic writer Jason Aneky considered the song to be a highlight on the album.

== Music video ==
The video depicts the band playing inside of a black room. Ashcroft as well as a young woman are shown standing in front of a building identified as Balfron Tower and walking inside it. The video ends with Ashcroft falling from the aforementioned building.

== Personnel ==
- Richard Ashcroft - lead vocals, tambourine;
- Nick McCabe - lead guitar, guitar effects;
- Simon Jones - bass guitar;
- Peter Salisbury - drums;

== Track listings ==
- CD and 12-inch (HUTCD 54; HUTT 54)
1. "This Is Music" – 3:35
2. "Let the Damage Begin" – 4:23
3. "You and Me" – 3:53
- 7-inch (HUT 54)
1. "This Is Music" – 3:35
2. "Let the Damage Begin" – 4:23
