= The Verve E.P. =

Verve

EP by Verve
- Released: 7 December 1992
- Recorded: September 1991 – July 1992
- Genre: Psychedelic rock
- Length: 31:29
- Labels: Vernon Yard (US); Hut (UK, HUTUS1)
- Producers: Barry Clempson, Paul Schroeder ("A Man Called Sun")

Verve chronology
Wigan Demos (1991)	Verve (1992)	A Storm in Heaven (1993)

Singles from Verve
- 1. "She's a Superstar" Released: 22 June 1992; 2. "Gravity Grave" Released: 5 October 1992

Professional ratings
Review scores
Source	Rating
AllMusic	4.5/5 stars
NME	8/10 stars

Verve is the first EP by English rock band Verve, released in December 1992 on Vernon Yard Recordings in the United States and Hut Records in the United Kingdom. Two singles from the EP would reappear on the B-side compilation No Come Down ("Gravity Grave") and the singles compilation This Is Music: The Singles 92–98 ("Gravity Grave" and "She's a Superstar").

The EP captures the Verve's early style of experimental psychedelic rock.

The cover was shot in Richard Ashcroft's flat in Wigan. The person on the cover is Ashcroft's then-girlfriend Sarah Carpenter.

== Track listing ==
No.	Title	Length
1.	"Gravity Grave" (Edit)	4:27
2.	"A Man Called Sun"	5:45
3.	"She's a Superstar" (Edit)	5:03
4.	"Endless Life"	5:32
5.	"Feel"	10:42
Total length:		31:29

== Personnel ==
The Verve

- Richard Ashcroft – vocals
- Nick McCabe – guitar
- Simon Jones – bass
- Peter Salisbury – drums

Technical

- All tracks produced by Barry Clempson except "A Man Called Sun"
- "A Man Called Sun" produced and mixed by Paul Schroeder
- Mixed by Barry Clempson and Tony Harris, Paul Schroeder ("A Man Called Sun")
- Photography by Michael Spencer Jones
- Sleeve concept and design by Brian Cannon for Microdot
