= Michael Spencer Jones =

British photographer and video director

Michael Spencer Jones (born 1961) is a British art photographer and music video director, best known for his work with Oasis and The Verve.

== Education ==
He attended Bournemouth & Poole College Art – now the Arts University Bournemouth from 1983 to 1986, where he studied photography and film, gaining a distinction.

== Work ==
Some of his iconic imagery helped define the Britpop era including his image which appeared on Oasis record breaking debut album, Definitely Maybe, in 1994. Two of Spencer Jones’ cover photographs—Definitely Maybe (#14) and "This Is Music" (#79)—featured in Q magazine's "The Hundred Best Record Covers of All Time" list published in 2001.

He is noted for his surrealist and sometimes experimental approach to photography and has produced a number of record sleeves for UK number one albums, including Urban Hymns (The Verve) and two Oasis albums, (What's the Story) Morning Glory? and Be Here Now. Spencer Jones is also noted for his portrait work, most notably a series of photographs he produced for the Children in War exhibition at the Imperial War Museum North.

In 2015 he founded Spellbound Galleries specialising in limited edition music photography and in 2016 brought out his first book Supersonic – The Oasis Photographs published by Omnibus Press. A collection of mainly unseen photographs of Oasis.
