= Simon Jones =

Simon Jones may refer to:

- Simon Jones (actor) (born 1950), English actor
- Simon Jones (cricketer) (born 1978), Welsh cricketer who plays for England
- Simon Jones (footballer) (born 1945), former Rochdale and Chester City player
- Simon Jones (musician) (born 1972), British musician, member of The Verve
- Simon Jones (priest) (born 1972), British priest and Dean of Lincoln
- Simon Cellan Jones (born 1963), British television and film director
- Simon Hewitt Jones, English violinist
- Simon Huw Jones (born 1960), vocalist, lyric writer and photographer
- Simon Peyton Jones (born 1958), British computer scientist
- Simon Jones (comics), a fictional DC Comics supervillain

== See also ==
- Simon Bucher-Jones (born 1964), author, poet and amateur actor
