= History (The Verve song) =

1995 single by the Verve

Single by the Verve

from the album A Northern Soul
- Released: 18 September 1995
- Studio: Olympic (London, England)
- Length: 5:28 (album version); 4:02 (radio edit)
- Label: Hut
- Songwriter: The Verve
- Producers: Owen Morris; the Verve

The Verve singles chronology
"On Your Own" (1995)	"History" (1995)	"Bitter Sweet Symphony" (1997)

"History" is a song by English rock band the Verve. It was included on their second album, A Northern Soul (1995), and was released 18 September 1995 as the third and final single from the album, charting at number 24 on the UK Singles Chart. The song is notable for being released after the band's sudden first break-up (the sign on the CD1 cover reads 'all farewells should be sudden', signalling the band's break-up). In 2014, NME ranked it at number 312 on their list of "The 500 Greatest Songs of All Time". There was no original music video filmed for the single. Instead, an official compilation of clips from the Verve's previous music videos was created by Richard Ashcroft.

== Composition and lyrics ==
The song begins with a string intro that is very similar to the intro of "Mind Games" by John Lennon. This was the first song by the band to feature strings (a formula that would later be used for several Urban Hymns singles). The opening lyrics of the song are based on the first two stanzas of William Blake's poem, London. The song is quite melancholic, with Melody Maker describing it as "an epic, windswept symphony of strings, flailing vocals and staggeringly bitter sentiments". It has been claimed that the song was written about Richard Ashcroft's split with his girlfriend, although Ashcroft denied this. The clapping on "History" was believed to be performed by Liam Gallagher.

== Track listings ==
- CD 1 (HUTCD 59)
1. "History" (radio edit)
2. "Back on My Feet Again"
3. "On Your Own" (acoustic)
4. "Monkey Magic" (Brainstorm mix)
- CD 2 (HUTDX 59)
1. "History" (album version)
2. "Grey Skies"
3. "Life's Not a Rehearsal"
- Cassette (HUTC 59)
1. "History" (radio edit)
2. "Back on My Feet Again"
