= Miles Leonard =

British music industry executive (born 1967)

- Born: 17 June 1967 (age 59); High Wycombe
- Occupation: Music Industry Executive
- Spouse: Luca Leonard
- Children: Sam, Cosmo, Luna

Miles Leonard is a British music industry executive and co-founder of NFT marketplace, Token||Traxx. Leonard was previously Chairman of Parlophone & Warner Bros. Records UK. He has worked for Virgin Records, EMI Records, Roadrunner Records and been credited as signing and breaking artists including Gorillaz, Coldplay, Tinie Tempah, The Verve, Royal Blood, Lily Allen, Paul Weller, Stereophonics and for reviving the career of Kylie Minogue.

== Career ==
Leonard started his career as an NVQ level plumber before starting in the music industry as an A&R scout at Virgin Records in 1991. Within his first year at Virgin he signed the band The Verve. He then worked for Roadrunner Records before joining Parlophone in 1996.

When Kylie Minogue signed to Parlophone in 1999, Leonard played a major role in reviving a career that lost direction and had reached a relatively low ebb in the UK while the artist was signed to Deconstruction Records. According to Leonard: "There was something there that hadn't been achieved by her last label, and I didn't think it really had anything to do with her. She was still very strong vocally, and still definitely a star. I believed in her as an artist and I knew that with the right project, the right songwriters, the right producers, the right team, she would still have a fanbase out there." Minogue's first single with Parlophone, "Spinning Around", saw the artist achieve her first UK #1 in ten years and heralded the start of a major career revival.

On 23 April 2008 Leonard was confirmed as the president of Parlophone. On 6 April 2011 EMI Music UK announced that it had appointed Leonard to the newly created position of "President of Parlophone & Virgin A&R Labels", where he will lead both Virgin and Parlophone's music discovery and development teams in the UK. In 2013 he became co-chairman of Warner Bros. Records UK.

In 2012 he took the lease of the Ring O'Bells public house in Compton Martin jointly with Matt Fisher from the Butcombe Brewery.

In 2013 he was appointed Chairman of Warner Bros. Records UK, following Warner Music Group's acquisition of Parlophone Label Group. In his tenor as chairman of both Warner and Parlophone he signed artists such as Dua Lipa and Royal Blood. Leonard received the Music Week A&R Award twice and also received Live Music Business Awards 'Best Label Partner'. Leonard was also Top 3 in Esquire's Top 100 Most Influential People under 40 in its music section.

Phil Harvey (Coldplay manager) said in an interview with Music Week, 'When in 2024, robots end up replacing humans throughout the music industry, the designers will probably base the prototype on Miles Leonard. Musically catholic with a predilection for funk, strong willed, creative, calm under pressure, fiercely loyal, tough as old boots and more than a little stubborn. Miles has been part of Coldplays inner circle since we signed to Parlophone in 1999 and he is still the man we want to most impress.'

In an interview with Billboard Magazine in 2022, Leonard said of the band: "A Rush of Blood was a milestone album. All bands have that album that is a turning point, the one that affects people most. If you ask fans they’ll say that it has something that resonates, it has emotion and complexity. Because it is so diverse in sound, when you go to a live show they have so many songs to draw from, and these have those moments where it’s pared down to piano and acoustic guitar. Despite big production, sometimes just paring something down to guitar or keyboard and vocal can have the biggest impact – and this album had those songs." Subsequently, during Coldplay's Music Of the Spheres World Tour, Chris Martin said on stage: "The man that signed us, his name is Miles Leonard, he is the reason why we are here. We went to meet in his office as four very naive young men, and he said, 'OK, I believe in you, I'll give you a record deal' - and that changed our lives. Without him, we would not be here."

Leonard is credited as executive producer of the film 'Pet Shop Boys: A Life in Pop'.

In 2021, Leonard co-founded Token||Traxx with music producer TommyD and others.
