= Gravity Grave =

Single by The Verve

from the album Verve
- Released: 5 October 1992
- Studio: "Gravity Grave" (Jacobs Studios - Farnham, Surrey) "Endless Life" (Ancoats, Manchester)
- Genre: Psychedelic rock, shoegazing
- Length: 8:21 (extended version); 4:27 (edit)
- Label: Hut Records
- Songwriter(s): Richard Ashcroft, Simon Jones, Peter Salisbury, Nick McCabe
- Producer(s): Barry Clempson

The Verve singles chronology
"She's a Superstar" (1992)	"Gravity Grave" (1992)	"Blue" (1993)

"Gravity Grave" is a song by the English rock band the Verve. It was released as the band's third single in the United Kingdom on 5 October 1992 by Hut Recordings. It reached number 196 on the UK Singles Chart.

"Gravity Grave" was recorded at Jacobs Studios in Farnham, Surrey. "Endless Life" was recorded at a studio in Ancoats, Manchester.

The cover was taken on Formby Beach, Merseyside, England. The man pictured on the cover is Tobyn Burnett. The cover was designed by Brian Cannon of Microdot and shot by Michael Spencer Jones.

== Music video ==
The music video features the band in a 1973/74 Dodge Charger traveling through a rural setting and at one point stopping at a roadside cafe. Various locations in Hartlepool are featured, including the horseshoe tunnel in Steetley, although much of the previously industrial area has been redeveloped into housing since the video was shot. The video contains a mix of colored as well as black and white footage. The video ends with the car fading as it moves on down the open road. This Dodge Charger was destroyed at the Heinegone Banger Race in King's Lynn on 13 June 2015.

== Track listing ==
- CD HUTCD 21
1. Gravity Grave (Extended Version) - 8:21
2. Endless Life - 5:32
3. A Man Called Sun (Live at Clapham Grand - 17/07/1992) - 5:29
4. Gravity Grave (Live Encore at Clapham Grand - 17/07/1992) - 2:35
- 10" HUTEN 21
1. Gravity Grave (Edit)
2. Endless Life - 5:32
3. She's a Superstar (Live at Clapham Grand - 17/07/1992)
- 12" HUTT 21
1. Gravity Grave (Extended Version) - 8:21
2. Endless Life - 5:32
3. A Man Called Sun (Live at Clapham Grand - 17/07/1992)
