= Acoustic Hymns Vol 1 =

Studio album by Richard Ashcroft
- Released: 29 October 2021
- Recorded: 2020–2021
- Studio: Abbey Road Studios, London
- Genre: Alternative rock, pop rock
- Length: 60:35
- Label: BMG; Righteous Phonographic Association
- Producer: Chris Potter; Richard Ashcroft

Richard Ashcroft chronology
Natural Rebel (2018)	Acoustic Hymns Vol 1 (2021)	Lovin' You (2025)

Singles from Acoustic Hymns Vol 1
- 1. "Bitter Sweet Symphony (Edit)" Released: 8 September 2021; 2. "This Thing Called Life (Edit)" Released: 22 September 2021; 3. "C'mon People (We're Making It Now)" Released: 21 November 2021

Professional ratings
Review scores
Source	Rating
The Line of Best Fit	7/10
NME	3/5 stars
Under the Radar	7.5/10

Acoustic Hymns Vol 1 is the sixth studio album by English singer and musician Richard Ashcroft. The album was released on 29 October 2021 through Righteous Phonographic Association and BMG Rights Management. Ashcroft's longtime collaborator Chris Potter returned for production duties after not being involved on the previous album Natural Rebel. The album consists of new versions of songs from Ashcroft's back catalogue, spanning both his solo career and his time with the Verve, mainly from 1997's Urban Hymns. The album debuted at number two on the UK Albums Chart, Ashcroft's highest chart position since 2006's Keys to the World.

== Background ==
This project started after the COVID-19 pandemic was over, bringing Ashcroft's regular collaborators together again. Some of the songs maintained their original arrangements, while other songs took on new approaches. The album was produced by Ashcroft with regular collaborator Chris Potter. It featured his regular live band with some special collaborators. Wil Malone provided the string arrangements, recorded at Abbey Road Studios. Chuck Leavell (The Allman Brothers, The Rolling Stones) performed piano, Roddy Bloomfield lead the brass section and Steve Wyreman contributed with acoustic guitar and backing vocals. Liam Gallagher provides co-lead vocals on "C'mon People (We're Making It Now)".

== Track listing ==
All tracks are written by Richard Ashcroft.

Acoustic Hymns Vol 1 track listing
No.	Title	Length
1.	"Bitter Sweet Symphony"	7:11
2.	"A Song for the Lovers"	5:06
3.	"Sonnet"	4:20
4.	"C'mon People (We're Making It Now)" (featuring Liam Gallagher)	4:55
5.	"Weeping Willow"	4:06
6.	"Lucky Man"	4:38
7.	"This Thing Called Life"	5:27
8.	"Space & Time"	5:00
9.	"Velvet Morning"	5:03
10.	"Break the Night with Colour"	4:34
11.	"One Day"	4:35
12.	"The Drugs Don't Work"	5:40
Total length:		60:35

== Personnel ==
Credits adapted from Tidal.

- Richard Ashcroft – lead vocals, production, engineering (all tracks); piano (tracks 1–7, 9, 11, 12), acoustic guitar (1–3, 6, 9–11), guitar (5, 8), percussion (5–7, 10–12), keyboards (7, 10), sleeve design
- Chris Potter – production, engineering (all tracks); percussion (1, 2, 4, 7, 10, 12), bass (4)
- Miles Showell – mastering
- John Barrett – engineering
- Ramera Abraham – engineering
- Rob Evans – piano engineering
- Chris Parker – studio assistance
- Kayla Hopkins – coordination
- Tori Sunnucks – coordination
- Steve Sidelnyk – drums, percussion, artwork
- Kate Lamont – backing vocals
- Steve Wyreman – acoustic guitar (1–4, 6–11); bass, piano (7)
- Ben Trigg – strings conductor (1–4, 6, 9, 12), cimbalom (2), cello (4, 8–11)
- Wil Malone – arrangement (1–4, 6, 9, 12)
- Chris Worsey – cello (1–4, 6, 9, 12)
- Ian Burdge – cello (1–4, 6, 9, 12)
- Nerys Richards – cello (1–4, 6, 9, 12)
- Bruce White – viola (1–4, 6, 9, 12)
- Reiad Chibah – viola (1–4, 6, 9, 12)
- Triona Milne – viola (1–4, 6, 9, 12)
- Marianne Haynes – violin (1–4, 6, 9, 12), string coordination
- Charlie Brown – violin (1–4, 6, 9, 12)
- Ciaran McCabe – violin (1–4, 6, 9, 12)
- Debbie Widdup – violin (1–4, 6, 9, 12)
- Everton Nelson – violin (1–4, 6, 9, 12)
- Jackie Shave – violin (1–4, 6, 9, 12)
- Natalia Bonner – violin (1–4, 6, 9, 12)
- Oli Langford – violin (1–4, 6, 9, 12)
- Patrick Kiernan – violin (1–4, 6, 9, 12)
- Phillip Granell – violin (1–4, 6, 9, 12)
- Tom Piggot-Smith – violin (1–4, 6, 9, 12)
- Effie Zilch – backing vocals (1–4, 7, 8)
- Miko Marks – backing vocals (1–4, 7, 8)
- Damon Minchella – bass (1–3, 5, 6, 8–11)
- Laurence Ungless – bass (1–3, 6, 9)
- Chuck Leavell – piano (1, 2, 12)
- Sonny Ashcroft – acoustic guitar (1, 3, 6)
- Adam Phillips – acoustic guitar (2–4, 6, 8–10)
- Dominic Glover – trumpet (2, 8, 10)
- Liam Gallagher – featured vocals (4)
- Justin Phipps – tambourine (4)
- Jim Hunt – saxophone (8, 10)
- Trevor Mires – trombone (8, 10)
- Amy May – viola (9)
- Wolfie Kutner – sleeve photo

== Charts ==
Chart performance for Acoustic Hymns Vol 1
Chart (2021)	Peak position
Austrian Albums (Ö3 Austria)	64
Belgian Albums (Ultratop Wallonia)	60
French Albums (SNEP)	194
German Albums (Offizielle Top 100)	37
Irish Albums (OCC)	23
Scottish Albums (OCC)	2
Swiss Albums (Schweizer Hitparade)	39
UK Albums (OCC)	2
