= C'mon People (We're Making It Now) =

2000 single by Richard Ashcroft

Single by Richard Ashcroft

from the album Alone with Everybody
- B-side: "Make a Wish"; "For the Lovers"
- Released: 11 September 2000
- Studio: Olympic, Metropolis (London, England)
- Length: 5:03
- Label: Hut; Virgin
- Songwriter(s): Richard Ashcroft
- Producer(s): Chris Potter; Richard Ashcroft

Richard Ashcroft singles chronology
"Money to Burn" (2000)	"C'mon People (We're Making It Now)" (2000)	"Check the Meaning" (2002)

Music video
- "C'mon People" on YouTube

"C'mon People (We're Making It Now)" is a song by English singer-songwriter Richard Ashcroft, included as the 10th track on his 2000 debut solo album, Alone with Everybody. Released on 11 September 2000 (Ashcroft's 29th birthday) as the third single from that album, the song peaked at number 21 on the UK Singles Chart and number 82 on the German Singles Chart.

An acoustic version of the song featuring Liam Gallagher was included on Ashcroft's 2021 album, Acoustic Hymns Vol 1.

== 2006 re-release ==
In April 2006, Richard Ashcroft told the Manchester Evening News that he intended to record a new version of "C'mon People (We're Making It Now)" as a charity single in support of England's bid in the 2006 FIFA World Cup. Reportedly the song was to be released by Parlophone on 12 June 2006 in the UK, with the catalog number CDR6706 but never materialised (see 2006 in British music). He had told the paper that "In the next few days I'm going to try and do an alternative football song and raise money for charity. I'm playing in a football match to raise money for Bobby Moore's charity and I'd like to split the money I raise from the song between that charity and the Teenage Cancer Trust. I want to do some good on this planet. I want to write a song, which actually mentions the team and the people involved. I never thought I'd do one, but I like to be the alternative. I think it will be a version of 'C'mon People' called 'C'mon England'".

== Music video ==
The official music video for the song was directed by Andy Morahan. It depicts Ashcroft, in a black v-neck shirt, and a backing band performing the song synced to dramatic strobe lights in a large, domed building. The video includes many shots featuring a cross hanging around Ashcroft's neck.

== Track listing ==
Standard

1. "C'mon People (We're Making It Now)" (album version)
2. "Make a Wish"
3. "For the Lovers"

== Credits and personnel ==
Credits are taken from the Alone with Everybody album booklet.

Studios

- Recorded and mixed at Olympic and Metropolis Studios (London, England)
- Mastered at Metropolis Mastering (London, England)

Personnel

- Richard Ashcroft – writing, vocals, guitars, piano, keyboards, percussion, production
- Pino Palladino – bass
- Peter Salisbury – drums
- Steve Sidelnyk – percussion, programming
- Chris Potter – production, mixing
- Tony Cousins – mastering

== Charts ==
Chart (2000)	Peak position
Europe (Eurochart Hot 100)	70
Germany (GfK)	82
Scotland (OCC)	15
UK Singles (OCC)	21

== Release history ==
Region	Date	Format(s)	Label(s)	Ref(s).
United Kingdom	11 September 2000	12-inch vinyl; CD	Hut; Virgin	
United States	2 October 2000	Triple A radio	Virgin	
Australia	29 January 2001	CD	Hut; Virgin	
