= Words Just Get in the Way =

2006 single by Richard Ashcroft

- DVD cover

Single by Richard Ashcroft

from the album Keys to the World
- B-side: "Circles"
- Released: 10 July 2006
- Length: 4:53
- Label: Parlophone
- Songwriter: Richard Ashcroft
- Producer: Chris Potter

Richard Ashcroft singles chronology
"Music Is Power" (2006)	"Words Just Get in the Way" (2006)	"Why Not Nothing?" / "Sweet Brother Malcolm" (2006)

"Words Just Get in the Way" is a song by English singer-songwriter Richard Ashcroft and is featured on his 2006 album, Keys to the World. It was released on 10 July 2006 as the third single from that album, charting at No. 40 on the UK Singles Chart, and as of 2025, remains his last UK Top 40 hit as a solo artist. The music video features footage of Richard's Homecoming Show at Old Trafford Cricket Ground, England (LCCC) on 17 June 2006. Guy Berryman, the bass player for the band Coldplay, can also be seen with Richard at Silverstone, home of the British Grand Prix.

== Track listings ==
- 7-inch clear vinyl (R6700)
1. "Words Just Get in the Way"
2. "Circles"
- CD (CDR6700)
1. "Words Just Get in the Way"
2. "New York" (live at London's Kings College)
- DVD (DVDR6700)
1. "Words Just Get in the Way"
2. "Circles"
3. "New York" (live at London's Kings College)
4. "Words Just Get in the Way" (video)
