= Natural Rebel =

Studio album by Richard Ashcroft
- Released: 19 October 2018
- Recorded: 2017–2018
- Genres: Alternative rock, pop rock
- Length: 46:23
- Labels: BMG; Righteous Phonographic Association
- Producers: Jon Kelly; Emre Ramazanoglu; Richard Ashcroft

Richard Ashcroft chronology
These People (2016)	Natural Rebel (2018)	Acoustic Hymns Vol 1 (2021)

Singles from Natural Rebel
- 1. "Surprised by the Joy" Released: 10 September 2018; 2. "Born to Be Strangers" Released: 22 October 2018; 3. "That's When I Feel It" Released: 23 January 2019

Professional ratings
Aggregate scores
Source	Rating
Metacritic	59/100
Review scores
Source	Rating
AllMusic	2.5/5 stars
Clash	4/10
The Daily Telegraph	3/5 stars
Drowned in Sound	2/10
The Guardian	3/5 stars
Loud and Quiet	2.5/5 stars
MusicOMH	2.5/5 stars
NME	2/5 stars
Uncut	6/10
Under the Radar	6/10

Natural Rebel is the fifth studio album by English singer and musician, Richard Ashcroft. The album was released on 19 October 2018 through Righteous Phonographic Association and BMG Rights Management. This is the first Ashcroft album not produced by longtime producer Chris Potter, instead by Jon Kelly and Emre Ramazanoglu, who also contributed drums on this album.

== Release and promotion ==
The album was announced on 15 August 2018 through his social media, along with Ashcroft's UK tour. The first single from the album, "Surprised by the Joy", was released on 10 September 2018. The second single, "Born to Be Strangers", was released on 22 October 2018. The third single, "That's When I Feel It", was released on 23 January 2019.

== Track listing ==
All tracks are written by Richard Ashcroft.

No.	Title	Length
1.	"All My Dreams"	4:27
2.	"Birds Fly"	3:57
3.	"Surprised by the Joy"	5:37
4.	"That's How Strong"	4:44
5.	"Born to Be Strangers"	4:13
6.	"That's When I Feel It"	4:02
7.	"We All Bleed"	3:58
8.	"A Man in Motion"	5:03
9.	"Streets of Amsterdam"	5:20
10.	"Money Money"	5:02
Total length:		46:23

Deluxe Edition bonus tracks

No.	Title	Length
11.	"Rare Vibration"	6:08
12.	"Guilded Halls"	4:08
Total length:		56:39

Digital released track

No.	Title	Length
13.	"Hey Columbo"	1:57
Total length:		58:36

== Charts ==
Chart (2018)	Peak position
Austrian Albums (Ö3 Austria)	71
Belgian Albums (Ultratop Flanders)	78
Belgian Albums (Ultratop Wallonia)	105
German Albums (Offizielle Top 100)	82
Irish Albums (IRMA)	18
Italian Albums (FIMI)	42
Scottish Albums (Official Charts)	2
Spanish Albums (PROMUSICAE)	62
Swiss Albums (Schweizer Hitparade)	47
UK Albums (Official Charts)	4
UK Independent Albums (Official Charts)	1
US Heatseekers Albums (Billboard)	10
US Independent Albums (Billboard)	36
US Top Alternative Album Sales (Billboard)	24
US Top Rock Album Sales (Billboard)	49
