= A Song for the Lovers =

Song by Richard Ashcroft

Single by Richard Ashcroft

from the album Alone with Everybody
- B-side: "(Could Be) A Country Thing, City Thing, Blues Thing"; "Precious Stone"
- Released: 3 April 2000
- Studio: Olympic, Metropolis (London, England)
- Length: 5:39
- Label: Hut; Virgin
- Songwriter: Richard Ashcroft
- Producers: Chris Potter; Richard Ashcroft

Richard Ashcroft singles chronology
"A Song for the Lovers" (2000)	"Money to Burn" (2000)

Audio
- "A Song for the Lovers" on YouTube

"A Song for the Lovers" is the first solo single from English singer-songwriter Richard Ashcroft, following the break-up of his band The Verve. The opening song off his album, Alone with Everybody; "A Song for the Lovers" was originally written by Ashcroft for the Verve's studio album Urban Hymns. Three different versions were recorded, but the song ultimately did not make the final cut. It was inspired by Joy Division's "Love Will Tear Us Apart".

"A Song for the Lovers" peaked at number three on the UK Singles Chart, becoming Ashcroft's highest-charting solo single alongside "Break the Night with Colour" (2006). Outside the UK, the song became a moderate hit in Europe and Oceania, peaking at number nine in Italy, number 11 in Ireland, number 42 in New Zealand, and number 59 in Australia. The single also sold well in Canada, peaking at number six on the Canadian Singles Chart.

== Music video ==
The music video for "A Song for the Lovers" premiered in May 2000 and was directed by Academy Award-nominated director Jonathan Glazer ("The Zone of Interest"). The video has a narrative style, shot in real-time with an element of diegetic sound unusual in most music videos. Diegetic sound was used previously by Glazer for "Rabbit in Your Headlights".

== Track listings ==
- UK CD, 12-inch, and cassette single

Canadian, Australian, and Japanese CD single

1. "A Song for the Lovers" (album version)
2. "(Could Be) A Country Thing, City Thing, Blues Thing"
3. "Precious Stone"
- European CD single
1. "A Song for the Lovers" (album version)
2. "(Could Be) A Country Thing, City Thing, Blues Thing"

== Credits and personnel ==
Credits are taken from the Alone with Everybody album booklet.

Studios

- Recorded and mixed at Olympic and Metropolis Studios (London, England)
- Mastered at Metropolis Mastering (London, England)

Personnel

- Richard Ashcroft – writing, vocals, guitars, keyboards, percussion, production
- Pino Palladino – bass
- Chuck Leavell – piano
- Peter Salisbury – drums
- Steve Sidelnyk – percussion, programming
- Teena Lyle – vibes
- Duncan Mackay – trumpet
- Lucinda Barry – harp
- The London Session Orchestra – strings
- Gavyn Wright – concertmaster
- Wil Malone – string arrangement and conducting
- Chris Potter – production, mixing
- Tony Cousins – mastering

== Charts ==
=== Weekly charts ===
Chart (2000)	Peak position
Australia (ARIA)	59
Canada (Nielsen SoundScan)	6
Europe (Eurochart Hot 100)	17
Germany (GfK)	82
Ireland (IRMA)	11
Italy (FIMI)	9
Italy Airplay (Music & Media)	2
Netherlands (Single Top 100)	83
New Zealand (Recorded Music NZ)	42
Scotland Singles (OCC)	2
Switzerland (Schweizer Hitparade)	78
UK Singles (OCC)	3

=== Year-end charts ===
Chart (2000)	Position
UK Singles (OCC)	101

== Certifications ==
Region	Certification	Certified units/sales
United Kingdom (BPI)	Gold	400,000^{‡}
^{‡} Sales+streaming figures based on certification alone.

== Release history ==
Region	Date	Format(s)	Label(s)	Ref(s).
Australia	3 April 2000	CD	Hut; Virgin	
United Kingdom	3 April 2000	CD; cassette	Hut; Virgin	
Japan	12 April 2000	CD	Hut; Virgin	
New Zealand	8 May 2000	CD	Hut; Virgin	
United States	6 June 2000	Mainstream rock; active rock; alternative radio	Hut; Virgin	
