= Why Not Nothing? / Sweet Brother Malcolm =

"Why Not Nothing?"
- 7" cover

Single by Richard Ashcroft

from the album Keys to the World
- B-side: "Sweet Brother Malcolm"
- Released: 4 December 2006
- Genre: Alternative rock
- Label: Parlophone
- Songwriter: Richard Ashcroft (both songs)
- Producer: Chris Potter

Richard Ashcroft singles chronology
"Words Just Get in the Way" (2006)	"Why Not Nothing?" / "Sweet Brother Malcolm" (2006)

Alternative cover
- Promo CD (CDRDJ6728) cover

"Why Not Nothing?" and "Sweet Brother Malcolm" are songs by English singer-songwriter Richard Ashcroft and are featured on his 2006 album, Keys to the World. The two songs were released on 4 December 2006 as a limited edition double A-sided 7-inch single from that album (see 2006 in British music).

== Track listing ==
Both songs written by Richard Ashcroft.

1. "Why Not Nothing?" – 4:09
2. "Sweet Brother Malcolm" – 4:51

== Music video ==
The music video for "Why Not Nothing?" was directed by Max Dodson and features the Perspex Confession Box, which was the original working title for the album Keys to the World.

At the end of the video, Richard puts his guitar on the floor and the start of Music Is Power can be heard in the background.
