= Music Is Power =

2006 single by Richard Ashcroft

- DVD cover

Single by Richard Ashcroft

from the album Keys to the World
- B-side: "Long Way Down"
- Released: 17 April 2006
- Length: 4:01
- Label: Parlophone
- Songwriter(s): Richard Ashcroft, Curtis Mayfield
- Producer(s): Chris Potter

Richard Ashcroft singles chronology
| "Break the Night with Colour" (2006) | "Music Is Power" (2006) | "Words Just Get in the Way" (2006) |

"Music is Power" is a song by English singer-songwriter Richard Ashcroft, the second track on his third studio album, Keys to the World (2006). The song features a sample from Walter Jackson's "It's All Over", written by Curtis Mayfield. It was released as the second single from that album on 17 April 2006, peaking at No. 20 in the UK Singles Chart on 23 April.

== Track listings ==
- 7-inch and CD (R6688; CDR6688)
1. "Music Is Power" – 4:01
2. "Long Way Down" – 5:42
- DVD (DVDR6688)
1. "Music Is Power" – 3:55
2. "Break the Night with Colour" (live at London's Kings College) – 5:24
3. "Music Is Power" (live at London's Kings College) – 5:20
4. "Music Is Power" (video) – 3:55
5. "Music Is Power" (making of the video) – 2:00
