= Money to Burn (Richard Ashcroft song) =

2000 single by Richard Ashcroft

Single by Richard Ashcroft

from the album Alone with Everybody
- B-side: "Leave Me High", "XXYY"
- Released: 12 June 2000
- Length: 6:15
- Label: Hut
- Songwriter: Richard Ashcroft
- Producers: Chris Potter, Richard Ashcroft

Richard Ashcroft singles chronology
"A Song for the Lovers" (2000)	"Money to Burn" (2000)	"C'mon People (We're Making It Now)" (2000)

"Money to Burn" is a song by English singer-songwriter Richard Ashcroft and is the eighth track on his 2000 album Alone with Everybody. The song was also released on 12 June 2000 as the second single from that album in the United Kingdom. The single peaked at No. 17 in the UK Singles Chart.

== Music video ==
A video directed by Jonathan Glazer, who had already directed the video for "A Song for the Lovers", was in production and had cost half a million pounds, but Ashcroft cancelled it because he didn't think that Glazer's take "captured the mood of the song." Ashcroft then hired Robert Hales to direct the new video which took place on Wall Street.

== Track listing ==
- CD HUTCD136, 12-inch HUTT136, cassette HUTC136
1. "Money to Burn" – 6:15
2. "Leave Me High" – 5:22
3. "XXYY" – 4:24
