= Check the Meaning =

2002 single by Richard Ashcroft

- 7-inch and CD cover

Single by Richard Ashcroft

from the album Human Conditions
- B-side: "The Miracle"
- Released: 7 October 2002
- Studio: Metropolis, Olympic, Astoria (London, England); Real World (Box, Wiltshire, England)
- Length: 8:04 (album version); 4:32 (radio edit)
- Label: Hut; Virgin
- Songwriter(s): Richard Ashcroft
- Producer(s): Richard Ashcroft; Chris Potter

Richard Ashcroft singles chronology
| "C'mon People (We're Making It Now)" (2000) | "Check the Meaning" (2002) | "Science of Silence" (2003) |

"Check the Meaning" is a song by English singer-songwriter Richard Ashcroft. It is the opening track on his second studio album, Human Conditions (2002). The song was released on 7 October 2002 as the first single from the album in the United Kingdom and peaked at number 11 on the UK Singles Chart. It also reached the top 20 in Ireland and Italy and peaked at number 21 in Canada.

== Track listings ==
UK CD single

1. "Check the Meaning" (edit)
2. "The Miracle"
3. "Check the Meaning" (Chris Potter remix)
4. "Check the Meaning" (alternative video)

UK 7-inch single and European CD single

1. "Check the Meaning" (edit)
2. "The Miracle"

UK DVD single

1. "Check the Meaning" (album version)
2. "Check the Meaning" (video)
3. "You on My Mind in My Sleep" (4Scott live performance)
  - Recorded live at London nightclub the Scala, 18 April 2002

== Credits and personnel ==
Credits are taken from the Human Conditions album booklet.

Studios

- Recorded at Metropolis, Olympic, Astoria (London, England), and Real World Studios (Box, Wiltshire, England)
- Mixed, edited, and mastered at Metropolis Studios (London, England)

Personnel

- Richard Ashcroft – writing, vocals, guitar, bass, production
- Martyn Campbell – bass
- Chuck Leavell – piano
- Kate Radley – keyboards
- Pete Salisbury – drums
- Talvin Singh – duggi tarang, shruti box, nadal
- The London Session Orchestra – orchestra
- Gavyn Wright – concertmaster
- Steve Sidelnyk – drum programming
- Richard Robson – programming
- Chris Potter – production, mixing
- Hippy – editing
- Tony Cousins – mastering

== Charts ==
| Chart (2002) | Peak position |
|---|---|
| Canada (Nielsen SoundScan) | 21 |
| Europe (Eurochart Hot 100) | 38 |
| Germany (GfK) | 94 |
| Ireland (IRMA) | 19 |
| Italy (FIMI) | 13 |
| Scotland (OCC) | 10 |
| UK Singles (OCC) | 11 |
