= Science of Silence =

2003 single by Richard Ashcroft

- 7" and CD cover

Single by Richard Ashcroft

from the album Human Conditions
- B-side: "Get Up Now"
- Released: 6 January 2003
- Recorded: 2002
- Genre: Alternative rock
- Length: 4:15 (album version); 3:53 (single edit)
- Label: Hut
- Songwriter: Richard Ashcroft
- Producer: Chris Potter

Richard Ashcroft singles chronology
"Check the Meaning" (2002)	"Science of Silence" (2003)	"Buy It in Bottles" (2003)

Alternative cover
- DVD cover

"Science of Silence" is a song by English singer-songwriter Richard Ashcroft and is the sixth track on his 2002 album Human Conditions. The song was also released on 6 January 2003 as the second single from that album in the United Kingdom (see 2003 in British music). The single peaked at No. 14 in the UK Singles Chart, the week of 18 January 2003, and spent five weeks on that chart's Top 100.

The music video was filmed at the beach near Manchester on 27 November 2002.

== Track listings ==
- 7" HUT163
1. "Science of Silence" (single edit) – 3:53
2. "Get Up Now" – 4:17
- CD HUTCD163
1. "Science of Silence" (single edit) – 3:53
2. "Get Up Now" – 4:17
3. "Check the Meaning" (The Freelance Hellraiser Remix) – 4:06
4. "Science of Silence" (video)
- DVD HUTDVD163
1. "Science of Silence" (album version)
2. "Science of Silence" (video/live performance)
3. "Bright Lights" (film footage)
