= Lovin' You (Richard Ashcroft album) =

Studio album by Richard Ashcroft
- Released: 10 October 2025
- Length: 43:45
- Label: Self-released
- Producers: Mirwais Ahmadzaï; Richard Ashcroft; Chris Potter; Emre Ramazanoglu

Richard Ashcroft chronology
Acoustic Hymns Vol. 1 (2021)	Lovin' You (2025)

Singles from Lovin' You
- 1. "Lover" Released: 22 May 2025; 2. "Lovin' You" Released: 28 August 2025

Lovin' You is the seventh studio album by English musician Richard Ashcroft. Initially scheduled for release on 3 October 2025, it was released on 10 October 2025.

== Release and promotion ==
Lovin' You was released on 10 October 2025. The album's first single released in May 2025 was "Lover". The album's title track was released as the second single on 28 August 2025.

== Critical reception ==
Professional ratings
Aggregate scores
Source	Rating
Metacritic	60/100
Review scores
Source	Rating
Clash	7/10
Louder Than War	4/5 stars
PopMatters	6/10
Uncut	6/10

Clash believes it "alternates between reflection and inspiration", concluding Ashcroft "doesn’t try to reinvent himself [...], rather distil what he’s always done best in his solo career, namely balance romantic devotion, spiritual searching, and flashes of rebellion, all delivered with a deftness of touch and that timeless voice." The Quietus opined that "You’d think someone who is a million different people from one day to the next would have more than a couple of ideas in that busy noggin of his."

== Track listing ==
All tracks are written by Richard Ashcroft, with additional writers noted.

Lovin' You – Standard edition
No.	Title	Writer(s)	Producer(s)	Length
1.	"Lover"	Ashcroft; Joan Armatrading	Richard Ashcroft; Emre Ramazanoglu	3:40
2.	"Out of These Blues"		Chris Potter	5:13
3.	"Heavy News"		Potter	4:24
4.	"Oh L'amour"		Potter	4:47
5.	"I'm a Rebel" (with Mirwais)	Ashcroft; Mirwais Ahmadzaï	Ahmadzaï	4:19
6.	"Find Another Reason"		Ashcroft; Potter	5:37
7.	"Lovin' You"	Ashcroft; Mason Williams	Ashcroft; Ramazanoglu	3:42
8.	"Live with Hope"		Ashcroft; Potter	4:10
9.	"Crimson Fire"		Ashcroft; Potter	4:31
10.	"Fly to the Sun"		Ashcroft; Potter	3:22
Total length:				43:45

== Personnel ==
Credits adapted from Tidal.

- Richard Ashcroft – vocals, guitars, keyboards, musical direction
- Mark "Spike" Stent – mixing
- Miles Showell – mastering
- Emre Ramazanoglu – programming (1, 7); bass, drums (1); synthesizer (7)
- Steve Wyreman – guitar (2–4, 6–10); bass, keyboards (2–4, 6, 8–10)
- Will Baldocchi – drums (2)
- Joe Bagale – drums (3, 4, 6, 8)
- Effie Zilch – background vocals (4, 8)
- Mirwais – keyboards, programming (5)
- Sarah Carter – background vocals (7)
- Richard Robson – keyboards (9)

== Charts ==
Chart performance for Lovin' You
Chart (2025)	Peak position
Belgian Albums (Ultratop Flanders)	80
Belgian Albums (Ultratop Wallonia)	158
French Physical Albums (SNEP)	86
French Rock & Metal Albums (SNEP)	32
Irish Albums (IRMA)	90
Irish Independent Albums (IRMA)	10
Japanese Download Albums (Billboard Japan)	87
Scottish Albums (Official Charts)	1
Swiss Albums (Schweizer Hitparade)	83
UK Albums (Official Charts)	3
UK Independent Albums (Official Charts)	1
