= Buy It in Bottles =

- 7" and CD cover

Single by Richard Ashcroft

from the album Human Conditions
- B-side: "Don't Take Me In", "The Journey’s Just Begun"
- Released: 7 April 2003
- Genre: Alternative rock
- Length: 4:39 (album version); 3:51 (single edit)
- Label: Hut Records
- Songwriter(s): Richard Ashcroft
- Producer(s): Chris Potter

Richard Ashcroft singles chronology
"Science of Silence" (2003)	"Buy It in Bottles" (2003)	"Break the Night with Colour" (2006)

Alternative cover
- DVD cover

"Buy It in Bottles" is a song by English singer-songwriter Richard Ashcroft and is the second track on his 2002 album Human Conditions. The song was also released as the third and final single from that album in the United Kingdom on 7 April 2003, peaking at number 26 in the UK Singles Chart (see 2003 in British music). The music video was filmed in London in March 2003.

== Track listings ==
- 7" HUT167
1. "Buy It in Bottles" (single edit) – 3:51
2. "Don't Take Me In" – 4:07
- CD HUTCD167
1. "Buy It in Bottles" (single edit) – 3:51
2. "Don't Take Me In" – 4:07
3. "The Journey’s Just Begun" – 6:41
4. "Buy It in Bottles" (video)
- DVD HUTDVD167
1. "Buy It in Bottles" (album version) – 4:39
2. "Buy It in Bottles" (alternate video)
3. "Buy It in Bottles" (live performance footage)

== Charts ==
Chart (2003)	Peak position
UK Singles (OCC)	26
