= RPA & The United Nations of Sound =

British alternative rock band

- Genre: Alternative rock
- Years active: 2010-2011
- Label: Parlophone
- Members: Richard Ashcroft (vocals and acoustic guitar); Steve Wyreman (guitar); Dwayne "DW" Wright (bass); Qyu Jackson (drums - live); Rico Petrillo (keyboards and samples - live)
- Past members: Derrick Wright (drums - studio); Reggie Dozer (sound engineering - studio); Benjamin Wright (string arrangements - studio)
- Website: richardashcroft.co.uk

RPA & The United Nations of Sound were a British alternative rock band formed by vocalist Richard Ashcroft, former lead singer of The Verve. Ashcroft announced the formation of the band (which is a pseudonym more than a real band) and presented the video of the first single, "Are You Ready?", on 18 January 2010 in an exclusive premiere on the NME website. "Are You Ready?" was released only in the UK on 1 April 2010 in a limited edition 12" vinyl. On 9 April 2010 the band released a fanclub-only track, "Third Eye (Colombus Circle)". In the first two weeks of June, Ashcroft and his musicians completed a European tour (Ancona, Paris, Berlin, Cologne, Amsterdam, Manchester and London), then they played in Tokyo and Osaka on 7–8 August 2010 during the Summer Sonic Festival 2010 and also in Melbourne and Sydney respectively on 30 July and 31 July. The band played in Australia also during the Splendour in the Grass Festival in late July. The band's debut album as Ashcroft's backing lineup, entitled "United Nations of Sound", was released on 19 July 2010. "Born Again", the first proper single, was officially released the same day of the album as a digital download.

After two months of silence, on 15 October Ashcroft released through his website a second fanclub-only track, "Here We Go Again". On the same day the song "Are You Ready?" was released as a single also in the United States as a digital download.

The album United Nations of Sound was released in the United States on 22 March 2011 under the name "Richard Ashcroft" through the record company Razor & Tie. The lead single "Are You Ready?" is featured over the closing credits of the film The Adjustment Bureau, along with the new song "Future's Bright", written and performed specifically for the film's opening by Ashcroft and ten-time Oscar-nominated composer Thomas Newman.

For the US release of "Are You Ready?", Ashcroft and Big Life Management commissioned Giorgio Testi for the promo – created out of live footage from a show at Shepherd’s Bush Empire. The video premiered on 7 February on the official website of Pulse Films, the production company.
