= Alone with Everybody =

Studio album by Richard Ashcroft
- Released: 26 June 2000
- Recorded: 1999–2000
- Venue: Olympic Studios, Metropolis Studios (London)
- Genre: Alternative rock, post-Britpop, psychedelic rock
- Length: 59:45
- Label: Hut
- Producer: Chris Potter, Richard Ashcroft

Richard Ashcroft chronology
Alone with Everybody (2000)	Human Conditions (2002)

Singles from Alone with Everybody
- 1. "A Song for the Lovers" Released: 3 April 2000; 2. "Money to Burn" Released: 12 June 2000; 3. "C'mon People (We're Making It Now)" Released: 11 September 2000

Alone with Everybody is the first solo album by English singer-songwriter Richard Ashcroft, released via Hut Records in June 2000 (see 2000 in British music). The songs "A Song for the Lovers", "C'mon People (We're Making It Now)" and "New York" were initially recorded with the Verve for their 1997 album Urban Hymns, but were never released.

== Release and reception ==
Professional ratings
Aggregate scores
Source	Rating
Metacritic	70/100
Review scores
Source	Rating
AllMusic	4/5 stars
Alternative Press	4/5 stars
Entertainment Weekly	C+
The Guardian	2/5 stars
NME	8/10
Pitchfork	2.9/10
Q	2/5 stars
Rolling Stone	3/5 stars
Select	3/5 stars
USA Today	3.5/4 stars

Upon its release, critical response to Alone with Everybody was generally positive. NME concluded its review by stating that "Ashcroft's newly discovered stability has done nothing to blunt his powers of communication or reduce his belief in the apocalyptic potential of music". At Metacritic, which assigns a normalized rating out of 100 to reviews from mainstream critics, the album has received an average score of 70, based on 20 reviews.

== Track listing ==
All lyrics and music by Richard Ashcroft.

1. "A Song for the Lovers" – 5:26
2. "I Get My Beat" – 6:02
3. "Brave New World" – 5:59
4. "New York" – 5:30
5. "You on My Mind in My Sleep" – 5:06
6. "Crazy World" – 4:57
7. "On a Beach" – 5:09
8. "Money to Burn" – 6:15
9. "Slow Was My Heart" – 3:44
10. "C'mon People (We're Making It Now)" – 5:03
11. "Everybody" – 6:34

Bonus tracks

12. "Leave Me High" – 5:22
13. "XXYY" – 4:24
- The two bonus tracks feature on the Japanese version of the album and were originally released as B-sides for the UK single "Money to Burn".

== Personnel ==
- Richard Ashcroft – co-producer, vocals, guitar, percussion, keyboards, piano, mellotron, organ, melodica

=== Additional musicians ===
- Peter Salisbury – drums
- Pino Palladino – bass
- Steve Sidelnyk – percussion, programming, drums
- Chuck Leavell – piano, Hammond organ
- Duncan Mackay – trumpet
- Lucinda Barry – harp
- Teena Lyle – vibes
- Chris Potter – bass
- Jim Hunt – saxophone, flute
- Jane Pickles – flute
- Anna Noakes – flute
- Judd Lander – harmonica
- B. J. Cole – pedal steel guitar
- Kate Radley – keyboards
- Craig Wagstaff – congas
- Philip D Todd – saxophone
- Nigel Hitchcock – saxophone
- Jamie Talbot – baritone saxophone
- John Barclay – trumpet
- Stuart Brooks – trumpet
- Will Malone – brass arrangement, string arrangement, conducting
- The London Session Orchestra – strings
- The London Community Gospel Choir – vocals
  - Samantha Smith, Leonard Meade, Vernetta Meade, Michelle-John Douglas, Donovan Lawrence, Irene Myrtle Forrester

=== Technical personnel ===
- Chris Potter – producer

== Release details ==
Country	Date	Label	Format	Catalog
Japan	June 2000	Toshiba-EMI	CD	VJCP-68222 / 4988006782549
Japan	29 March 2002	Toshiba-EMI	CD	VJCP-68403
United Kingdom	26 June 2000	Hut Records	2LP	HUTDLP63
United Kingdom	26 June 2000	Hut Records	CD	CDHUTX63 / 7243 8 49491 2 9
United States	27 June 2000	Virgin Records	CD	7243 8 49494 2 6
