= The Plea (band) =

Irish band

The Plea are an Irish, Ballyliffin based, indie rock quartet. They were the first band signed to Apollo Records (an indie/rock offshoot of Belgian dance/techno label R&S Records, who signed acts such as Aphex Twin).

== Band members ==
- Denny Doherty: Vocals, Electric/Acoustic Guitars, Piano
- Dermot Doherty: Electric/Acoustic Guitars, BV's
- Paul Toland: Bass
- Gerry Strawbridge: Drums and Percussion

Additional keyboards by John Leighton

== Biography ==
Brothers Denny and Dermot Doherty formed their first band in their teens, moving from Ballyliffin to London to Boston, performing covers and original music. They spent a year in Minnesota recording a never-released album after a scout for a US label saw them at London's Barfly. Returning to Ballyliffin, the brothers formed The Plea with drummer Gerry Strawbridge and bassist Paul Toland, and began posting original material to MySpace. The band signed with Apollo Records, a bespoke Indie offshoot of R&S Records, to produce their debut album. The band have been working with producer Chris Potter (U2, Blur, The Verve, The Rolling Stones), the first track entitled "Praise Be" from those sessions has been uploaded to the Planet Function SoundCloud account.

Denny describes The Plea's music and motivation as:

We want to write strong, uplifting songs that make people feel good and, hopefully, inspire them like our idols inspired us ... We have to live with these songs. We have to love them.

== Label ==
Apollo Records, an indie offshoot of Belgian dance/techno label R&S Records. R&S Records are better known for signing such acts as Aphex Twin, Joey Beltram, and System 7, but Dermot describes the band's decision to sign with R&S as a combination of finding shared interests with the producers and "they had so much faith in us. Unlike any label we've dealt with before, they've done exactly what they promised they would do, only better."

== Discography ==
- The Haunted (as "Jacob's Plea")
- "Coronary Hills" (2 track single)
- Modern Chaos
- Nothin' But Trouble (EP)
- The Dreamers Stadium
