= Human Conditions =

Studio album by Richard Ashcroft
- Released: 21 October 2002
- Recorded: 2001–2002
- Studio: Metropolis, London; Astoria, London; Olympic, London; Real World, Bath
- Genre: Alternative rock
- Length: 54:51
- Label: Hut
- Producer: Chris Potter, Richard Ashcroft

Richard Ashcroft chronology
Alone with Everybody (2000)	Human Conditions (2002)	Keys to the World (2006)

Singles from Human Conditions
- 1. "Check the Meaning" Released: 7 October 2002; 2. "Science of Silence" Released: 6 January 2003; 3. "Buy It in Bottles" Released: 7 April 2003

Human Conditions is the second album by English singer-songwriter Richard Ashcroft. It was released on Hut Records in 2002.

== Release and reception ==
Professional ratings
Aggregate scores
Source	Rating
Metacritic	61/100
Review scores
Source	Rating
AllMusic	3/5 stars
Blender	2/5 stars
Drowned in Sound	2/10
Entertainment Weekly	A
The Guardian	2/5 stars
Mojo	3.5/5 stars
Rolling Stone	3/5 stars
Spin	8/10
Stylus	F
Uncut	3/5 stars

Review aggregating website Metacritic reports a normalised score of 61 based on 15 reviews, which indicated a "generally favourable" reception. However, many of the critics had negative views of Ashcroft's ideas. Some of the negative reviews, included Nick Southall of Stylus, who remarked that "Ashcroft obviously sees himself as some kind of incisive commentator with a greater depth of understanding of the human condition than those around him. This record reveals with alarming clarity that he is actually a poor songwriter, dire lyricist, and arrogant buffoon all at the same time." Andrew Lynch of entertainment.ie gave the album two stars out of five, calling it "in the final analysis, quite unbelievably boring." Rowan Shaeffer of Counterculture gave it three stars out of five and praised aspects of the album, though still feeling that "for the most part Richard Ashcroft seems be going through the motions; and while he's produced a good album, it's an ultimately unfulfilling listen."

== Details ==
In 2003, when asked about the naysayers to the album, Ashcroft responded: "If I had put on fifteen stone and Kate had left me and I’d almost [overdosed] on smack, then this record would have been received very well".

== Track listing ==
All tracks composed by Richard Ashcroft

1. "Check the Meaning" – 8:04
2. "Buy It in Bottles" – 4:39
3. "Bright Lights" – 5:15
4. "Paradise" – 5:37
5. "God in the Numbers" – 6:58
6. "Science of Silence" – 4:15
7. "Man on a Mission" – 5:29
8. "Running Away" – 4:16
9. "Lord I've Been Trying" – 5:23
10. "Nature Is the Law" – 4:55

=== Bonus track ===
The Japanese and American editions of the album featured one bonus track originally released as a B-side for the UK single "Check the Meaning".

- "The Miracle" – 3:51

== Personnel ==
- Richard Ashcroft – vocals, guitar, percussion, bass, piano, Wurlitzer, keyboards
- Peter Salisbury – drums
- Kate Radley – keyboards
- Martyn Campbell – bass
- Talvin Singh – tablas, beats, drones, shruti box, duggi tarang, madal
- Chuck Leavell – piano, Hammond organ
- Richard Robson – programming
- Steve Sidelnyk – drum programming, programming
- Craig Wagstaff – percussion
- Jim Hunt – flute, saxophone
- Matt Clifford – Wurlitzer
- Brian Wilson – backing vocals, backing vocal arrangement on "Nature Is the Law"
- Wil Malone – orchestral arrangements, conducting
- The London Session Orchestra – strings
- London Community Gospel Choir – choir

== Release details ==
Country	Date	Label	Format	Catalog
Japan	17 October 2002	Toshiba-EMI	CD	VJCP-68440 / 4988006804005
United Kingdom	21 October 2002	Hut Records	2LP	HUTDLP77 / 7243 8 13383 1 5
United Kingdom	21 October 2002	Hut Records	CD	CDHUT77 / 7243 8 13383 2 2
United States	25 February 2003	Virgin Records	CD	7243 8 13384 2 1
