= These People (Richard Ashcroft album) =

Studio album by Richard Ashcroft
- Released: 20 May 2016
- Recorded: 2014–2015
- Genre: Alternative rock; pop rock
- Length: 51:05
- Label: Righteous Phonographic Association, Cooking Vinyl, Harvest
- Producer: Chris Potter; Richard Ashcroft

Richard Ashcroft chronology
United Nations of Sound (2010)	These People (2016)	Natural Rebel (2018)

Singles from These People
- 1. "This Is How It Feels" Released: 1 March 2016; 2. "Hold On" Released: 16 May 2016; 3. "They Don't Own Me" Released: 8 August 2016; 4. "Out of My Body" Released: 8 November 2016; 5. "These People" Released: 19 August 2016; 6. "Black Lines" Released: 17 February 2017; 7. "Out of My Body (Remixes EP)" Released: 31 March 2017

These People is the fourth studio album from British singer and musician, Richard Ashcroft. The album was released on 20 May 2016 through Righteous Phonographic Association, Cooking Vinyl and Harvest Records. This is his first solo album since his 2010's solo project album, United Nations of Sound, and also his first main studio album since 2006's, Keys to the World.

== Critical reception ==
Professional ratings
Aggregate scores
Source	Rating
Metacritic	51/100
Review scores
Source	Rating
AllMusic	3.5/5 stars
Blurt	1/5 stars
Clash	4/10
Drowned in Sound	3/10
The Guardian	2/5 stars
The Line of Best Fit	4/10
Loud and Quiet	6/10
musicOMH	2.5/5 stars
NME	4/5 stars
Pitchfork	5.1/10

These People received generally mixed reviews from music critics. At Metacritic, which assigns a normalized rating out of 100 to reviews from mainstream critics, the album received an average score of 51 based on 15 reviews.

== Track listing ==
All tracks are written by Richard Ashcroft.

No.	Title	Length
1.	"Out of My Body"	4:30
2.	"This Is How It Feels"	5:06
3.	"They Don't Own Me"	5:48
4.	"Hold On"	5:40
5.	"These People"	4:49
6.	"Everybody Needs Somebody to Hurt"	4:40
7.	"Picture of You"	4:47
8.	"Black Lines"	5:10
9.	"Ain't the Future so Bright"	4:47
10.	"Songs of Experience"	5:48
Total length:		51:05

Japanese bonus tracks

No.	Title	Length
11.	"How the West Was Lost"	3:26
Total length:		54:31

== Personnel ==
- Richard Ashcroft - vocals, guitar, bass, keyboards, drums, programming
- Steve Wyreman, Adam Phillips - guitar
- Chris Potter, Damon Minchella - bass
- Geoff Dugmore - drums
- Steve Sidelnyk - drums, programming
- Mirwais Ahmadzaï - keyboards, programming on "Out of My Body"
- Roy Kerr - additional programming on "Out of My Body"
- Wil Malone - string arrangements
- Perry Montague-Mason - string leader

== Charts ==
Chart (2016)	Peak position
Austrian Albums (Ö3 Austria)	70
Belgian Albums (Ultratop Flanders)	24
Belgian Albums (Ultratop Wallonia)	43
Dutch Albums (Album Top 100)	92
French Albums (SNEP)	97
German Albums (Offizielle Top 100)	51
Irish Albums (IRMA)	17
Italian Albums (FIMI)	34
Japanese Albums (Oricon)	138
Scottish Albums (OCC)	1
Swiss Albums (Schweizer Hitparade)	32
UK Albums (OCC)	3
UK Independent Albums (OCC)	1
US Heatseekers Albums (Billboard)	12
