= United Nations of Sound (album) =

Studio album by RPA & The United Nations of Sound (Richard Ashcroft)
- Released: 19 July 2010
- Recorded: 2009–2010 in Los Angeles, New York and London
- Genre: Alternative rock
- Length: 56:06
- Label: Parlophone
- Producer: No I.D.

Richard Ashcroft chronology
Keys to the World (2006)	United Nations of Sound (2010)	These People (2016)

Singles from United Nations of Sound
- 1. "Born Again" Released: 19 July 2010; 2. "Are You Ready?" Released: 15 October 2010 (US-only)

United Nations of Sound is the debut album by British alternative rock band RPA & The United Nations of Sound, Richard Ashcroft's project, released on 19 July 2010 through Parlophone (see 2010 in British music). The album was released in the United States on 22 March 2011 under the name "Richard Ashcroft" through the record company Razor & Tie.

== Reception ==
Professional ratings
Aggregate scores
Source	Rating
Metacritic	39/100
Review scores
Source	Rating
AllMusic	2.5/5 stars
The A.V. Club	D+
Drowned in Sound	4/10
The Guardian	1/5 stars
musicOMH	1/5 stars
NME	3/10
Pitchfork	3.2/10
Q	2/5 stars
Rolling Stone	2/5 stars
Slant Magazine	2/5 stars

United Nations of Sound received generally scathing reviews from critics on its initial release. At Metacritic, which assigns a normalised rating out of 100 to reviews from mainstream critics, the album received an average score of 39, based on eight reviews, which indicates "Generally unfavorable reviews". UK-based review aggregation website AnyDecentMusic? correlated 23 reviews with an ADM Rating of 4.5. In the United States, Spin Magazine said the result a "fruitful collaboration" and Nylon Magazine called the new album "a commanding performance".

== Track listing ==
No.	Title	Writer(s)	Length
1.	"Are You Ready?"	Richard Ashcroft, Maurice Gibb	6:31
2.	"Born Again"	Richard Ashcroft	4:55
3.	"America"	Richard Ashcroft	4:17
4.	"This Thing Called Life"	Richard Ashcroft	5:25
5.	"Beatitudes"	Richard Ashcroft	4:23
6.	"Good Lovin'"	Richard Ashcroft	4:45
7.	"How Deep Is Your Man?"	Richard Ashcroft, John Lee Hooker, E. Wilson, Kevin Randolph	3:28
8.	"She Brings Me the Music"	Richard Ashcroft	4:15
9.	"Royal Highness"	Richard Ashcroft	4:13
10.	"Glory"	Richard Ashcroft	3:11
11.	"Life Can Be So Beautiful"	Richard Ashcroft, David Axelrod, E. Wilson, Kevin Randolph	5:28
12.	"Let My Soul Rest"	Richard Ashcroft	4:58
Total length:			56:06

European iTunes edition
No.	Title	Writer(s)	Length
13.	"Captain Rock"	Richard Ashcroft	5:04

US edition
No.	Title	Writer(s)	Length
9.	"Third Eye"	Richard Ashcroft	4:53

RPA Fan Club Exclusive Tracks
No.	Title	Writer(s)	Length
9.	"Third Eye"	Richard Ashcroft	4:53
14.	"Here We Go Again"	Richard Ashcroft	5:10
15.	"Lead the Way"	Richard Ashcroft	6:12
16.	"Screw You Screw Me"	Richard Ashcroft	6:19

== Trivia ==
- "Are You Ready?" is featured in the 2011 Volkswagen Jetta's commercial, it has been used in Fox Sports broadcasts of Major League Baseball's postseason games including the opening of the 2010 World Series, and it was played in many ESPN promos during the 2010 FIFA World Cup. The song is also featured over the closing credits of the film The Adjustment Bureau in March 2011, along with "Future's Bright", a song written and performed specifically for the film's opening by Richard and ten-time Oscar-nominated composer Thomas Newman.
- "She Brings Me the Music" appears in an episode of Chuck, Season 4 Episode 4.
- "Are You Ready?" has an incorrect credit to Robin Gibb in the accompanying booklet. The sample used in the song is from the song "On Time" which is a song Maurice Gibb wrote and recorded in 1971 and issued as a B-side to Bee Gees' "My World" in January 1972.
