= Richard Ashcroft =

English singer-songwriter (born 1971)

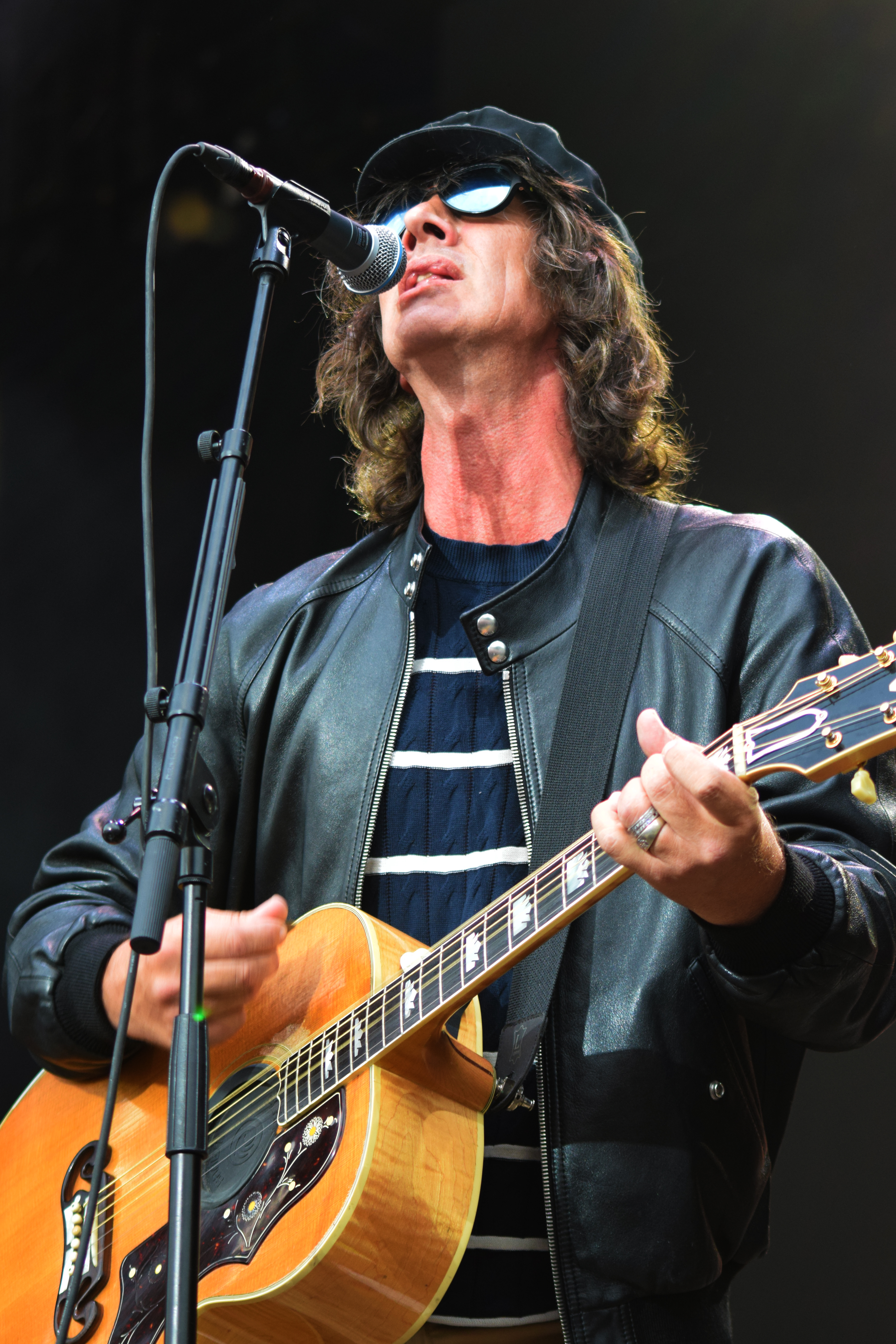
- Ashcroft performing in 2026

Background information
- Also known as: RPA
- Born: Richard Paul Ashcroft; 11 September 1971 (age 55); Billinge, Lancashire, England
- Genres: Alternative rock; Britpop; neo-psychedelia; shoegaze (early)
- Occupations: Singer; songwriter; composer; musician
- Instruments: Vocals; guitar; keyboards; melodica
- Years active: 1990–present
- Labels: Righteous Phonographic Association; Cooking Vinyl; Parlophone; Hut; Virgin
- Formerly of: The Verve
- Spouse: Kate Radley (m. 1995)
- Website: www.richardashcroft.com

Richard Paul Ashcroft (born 11 September 1971) is an English musician, singer, and songwriter. He formed the alternative rock band the Verve in 1990 and served as the sole songwriter, lead singer and rhythm guitarist throughout the band's lifetime. (Note: The band started as a jam-based band; however, McCabe has clarified that Ashcroft was the one who created the lyrics.) In 2000, Ashcroft embarked on a solo career, releasing six UK top-three solo albums, including Alone with Everybody, Keys to the World and These People.

Ashcroft's songwriting has been commended by the British Academy of Songwriters, Composers, and Authors twice with an Ivor Novello Award. The Verve's Urban Hymns is one of the UK's best-selling albums of all time. Ashcroft's work has influenced artists such as Oasis, Coldplay, and the Britpop and indie rock genres. Noel Gallagher of Oasis described Ashcroft as a "genius", and Chris Martin of Coldplay called him "the best singer in the world".

On 10 October 2025, Ashcroft released his seventh studio album, Lovin' You.

== Early life ==
Ashcroft was born at Billinge Hospital in Wigan, Lancashire. The eldest child of Frank Ashcroft, an office worker, and Louise (née Baxter), a hairdresser. He has two younger sisters. In his early childhood, he was reportedly very shy and had to be replaced in a school nativity play due to stage fright.

The sudden death of his father from a brain hemorrhage in 1982, when Ashcroft was just 11, became a traumatic turning point in his life. Ashcroft suffered a profound depression, and did not know how to deal with it, saying he "swallowed" the tragedy and even attended school the next day. He put up a front of the "class clown" at his school, due to which, a teacher at his school started calling him the "cancer of the class". He used music as a primary coping mechanism, recalling a profound sense of existential questioning that set him apart from his peers.

An accomplished athlete in his youth, Ashcroft harboured serious ambitions of becoming a professional footballer. He was a talented junior player for Wigan Athletic and was also associated with Rotherham United.

Ashcroft decided he wanted to be a musician during a camping trip when he was 13, as he watched the Jean-Luc Godard documentary 1+1, which showcased the Rolling Stones in the process of making a song, namely "Sympathy for the Devil". He recalls immediately thinking "That's the way to spend your life."

During his teens, he recalls living through a musical cultural shift was happening as his friends frequented Wigan Pier, which hosted alternative musicians and DJs. Among these were The Stone Roses, who further inspired Ashcroft to make music, alongside The Smiths and the Happy Mondays.

Ashcroft attended Up Holland High School alongside future bandmates Simon Jones, Peter Salisbury, and Simon Tong. In 1987, he enrolled at Winstanley College to study Theatre Studies, Philosophy and Religion. He attended from 1987 to 1989. His tutors described him as "incredibly intelligent", and was perceived as a detached student who prioritised his burgeoning musical ambitions over academic achievement. It was at Winstanley where he recruited Nick McCabe, completing the core line-up of what would become The Verve.

== The Verve ==
=== Formation and psychedelic origins (1990–1993) ===
Ashcroft formed the band in Wigan in 1990 alongside Simon Jones and Peter Salisbury, initially performing under the name Verve. After hearing Nick McCabe playing guitar from behind a closed cubicle, Ashcroft waited outside to invite the unknown musician to join his project based solely on his "ethereal" sound.

In August 1990, the band debuted at a friend's 18th birthday party at the Honeysuckle Pub on Pool Street, Wigan.

The band's debut album, A Storm in Heaven (1993), was characterized by its avant-garde, shoegaze-influenced textures. Recorded at Sawmills Studios, the sessions were largely improvisational; Ashcroft would edit usable fragments from sprawling jams to structure them into cohesive songs. Reflecting on this period, Ashcroft admitted the group was frequently under the influence of LSD during the recording process, which contributed to the album's expansive, psychedelic atmosphere. It was during this early era that the press bestowed upon him the mercurial sobriquet "Mad Richard" due to his intense and unpredictable stage presence.

=== Creative friction and A Northern Soul (1995) ===
By 1995, Ashcroft's songwriting evolved towards a more structured, literary style, moving away from pure abstraction. This shift culminated in the band's second album, A Northern Soul. A definitive turning point was the track "History", which Ashcroft composed in a single 3 AM session inspired by the poetry of William Blake. Sonically, the song marked a departure from their earlier sound, featuring orchestral arrangements by Wil Malone and unconventional studio contributions, such as handclaps by Liam Gallagher.

However, the intense recording sessions at Loco Studios exacerbated creative differences between Ashcroft and McCabe. The latter's discomfort with the new "lyric-first" direction, coupled with the band's volatile mental health, led to an initial split in 1995 shortly after the album's release.

=== Global stardom and Urban Hymns (1997–1999) ===
Following a brief period where Ashcroft intended to pursue a solo career, he reconciled with McCabe in 1997. The band—now including Simon Tong—reformed to release Urban Hymns, which propelled them to international superstardom. Ashcroft became the "face of British rock", winning an Ivor Novello Award for his songwriting.

The lead single, "Bitter Sweet Symphony", reached number 12 on the US charts and became a cultural phenomenon. Despite its success, the song became the subject of a high-profile legal dispute with ABKCO Records over a sample from a Rolling Stones orchestral cover; Ashcroft was stripped of his royalties and songwriting credits for over two decades until the rights were voluntarily returned to him in 2019. The band swept the 1998 BRIT Awards, winning Best British Group and Best British Album, before splitting again in April 1999 amidst internal exhaustion.

=== Reunions and final split (2007–2009) ===
The Verve reunited for a third time in 2007, headlining major festivals and releasing the album Forth (2008), which debuted at number one in the UK. However, the reunion was short-lived; in August 2009, the band announced their final dissolution due to renewed tensions and McCabe's struggles with alcohol, which had made further collaboration untenable.

== Solo career ==
=== Alone with Everybody and Human Conditions: 2000–2004 ===
Ashcroft's first solo single, "A Song for the Lovers", peaked at No. 3 in the UK chart in April 2000. It was followed by the single "Money to Burn", which reached the UK Top 20 at No. 17. The album Alone with Everybody was released in June, reaching number 1 and receiving platinum status in the UK. Album reviews were generally positive. In September, a third single was released, "C'mon People (We're Making It Now)", entering the charts at No. 21. Richard does not publish his song lyrics in the inlay cards of his albums or singles, as he feels they are personal to him.

Ashcroft performing in 2004

Ashcroft began work on his second album, Human Conditions, in 2002. The lead single, "Check the Meaning", was released in early October, and peaked at No. 11 on the UK Singles Chart. The album was released later that month and reached No. 3 on the UK Albums Chart. Reception to the album was generally positive. Review aggregating website Metacritic reports a normalised score of 61% based on 15 reviews. In response to negative reaction to the album, Coldplay's Chris Martin – a fan of both Ashcroft and the Verve – defended the album's merits which "made an impression" on Ashcroft. The appreciation shown would later result in a support slot for Ashcroft, serving as the opening act for Coldplay during a European tour. The album's second single, "Science of Silence", was released the following January and charted at No. 14 in the UK. On 26 March, Ashcroft made his first live appearance of 2003 at London's Royal Albert Hall as part of the third annual Teenage Cancer Trust charity fundraising event, before "Buy It in Bottles", the third and final single to be taken from the album, was released on 7 April, charting at No. 26.

Aside from a limited number of appearances in 2003, Ashcroft was absent from the music business for about two years. He later explained this in 2006, stating that "[e]veryone got it into their heads over the last few years that I was in my ivory tower like Lennon, baking bread all day. The fact of the matter was that I was bringing up kids".

=== Live 8 and Keys to the World: 2005–2007 ===
Ashcroft began playing shows again in mid-2005, and, on 2 July at the Live 8 concert in Hyde Park, Coldplay invited him to perform with them. They performed the Verve's hit "Bitter Sweet Symphony", after having rehearsed the song in Crystal Palace. Chris Martin introduced Ashcroft's performance of the song as "probably the best song ever written, and here's the best singer in the world", helping to renew interest in Ashcroft. At Christmas 2005, a documentary titled Live 8: A Bitter Sweet Symphony was aired on the BBC, featuring a portion of Ashcroft's performance as the show's opening soundtrack.

After the disintegration of Hut Records in 2004, Ashcroft signed to Parlophone, where he released his third solo album, Keys to the World, on 23 January 2006. The first single from the album, "Break the Night with Colour", was released on 9 January 2006, and entered the UK Singles Chart at number 3. Following his performance at Live 8, Ashcroft was booked as a support act for Coldplay's Twisted Logic Tour throughout North America and the UK, which started on 14 March in Ottawa, Canada. Ashcroft saw the support slot as "a good chance to play to a significant amount of people and say, 'I’m back. And this is what I do'".

The album's second single, "Music Is Power", charted at number 20. On 18 April 2006, he recorded the Live from London EP, the ninth in a series of EPs released exclusively as digital downloads from Apple's iTunes Store. The EP was released six days later on 24 April. With the release of Keys to the World, the general consensus was that Ashcroft was "back at the top of his musical game". He announced his largest UK tour for years for May 2006, culminating in three nights at London's Brixton Academy. Following the tour, Ashcroft had hoped to perform two "Homecoming" shows at Wigan Athletic's 25,000-seater JJB Stadium in June 2006, but was unable to do so as the proposed venue lacked the "appropriate licence". As a consequence, he played at Lancashire County Cricket Club in Old Trafford, in his biggest solo show up to then. He was supported by acts such as Razorlight and the Feeling, while DJ Shadow joined Ashcroft on stage to perform "Lonely Soul", their UNKLE collaboration from 1998's Psyence Fiction LP. Another UK tour followed five months later, culminating in a show at Manchester's M.E.N. Arena on 30 November. Ashcroft did not tour Keys to the World outside Europe.

Ashcroft hinted at the possible release of a new version of "C'mon People (We're Making It Now)" for the Bobby Moore Cancer Fund, which would coincide with England's participation in the 2006 Football World Cup, but the single never materialised. Instead, his next release was "Words Just Get in the Way", which charted at No. 40 in the UK Singles Chart. On 4 December, the double a-side "Why Not Nothing" / "Sweet Brother Malcolm" was released on limited edition 7" vinyl.

=== RPA & the United Nations of Sound, These People, Natural Rebel: 2008–2018 ===
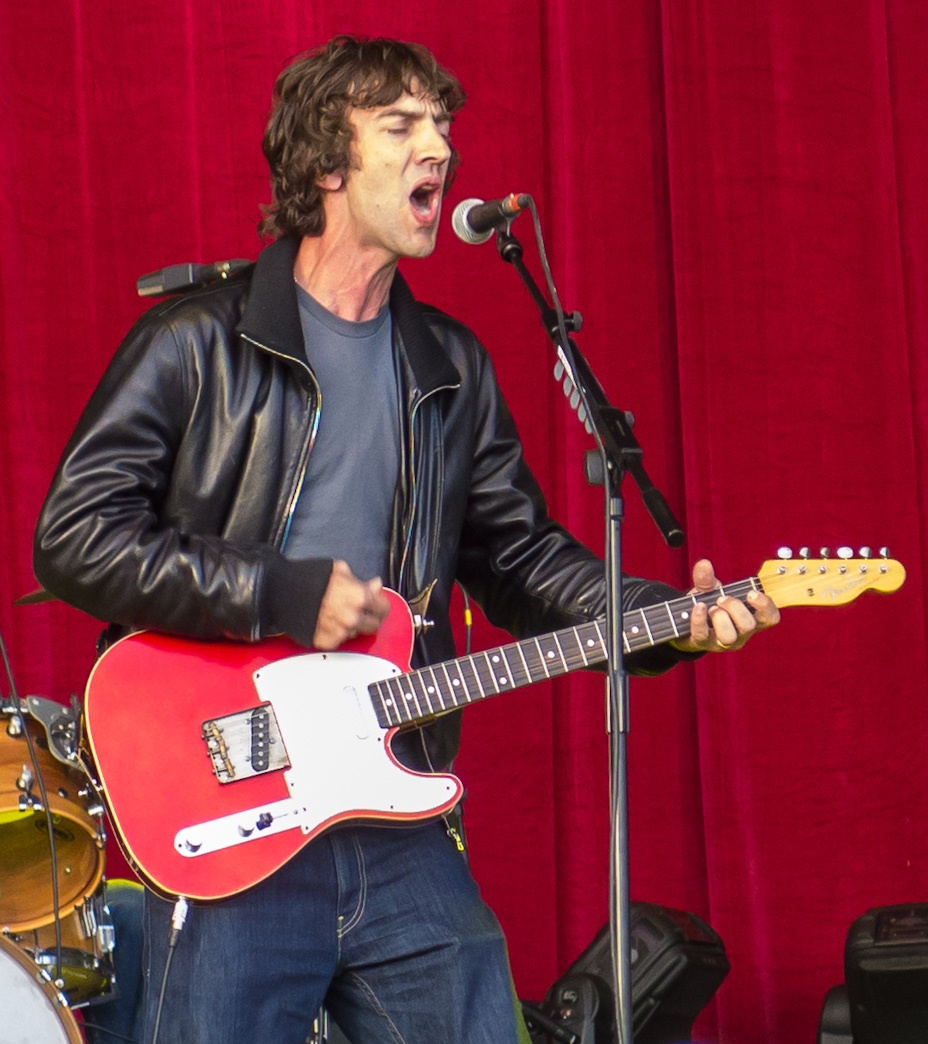
Ashcroft in 2012

Ashcroft played a solo show on 25 August 2008 as part of the Last Days of Summer Festival in Buckingham. The Verve broke up for a third time sometime between the last rehearsals in late 2008 and the summer of 2009.

At that time, Ashcroft was contractually obligated to record another album for Parlophone. A B-side compilation was considered a possibility, as Ashcroft's team asked the fans through his site about their feelings on such an album. In December 2009, Ashcroft contributed the lead soundtrack song for the documentary The Journey. A video of the song was posted on Ashcroft's site. Also, through his blog Brain, he stated that he would release a new album in 2010. Sources revealed he worked on a number of new songs in New York, Los Angeles and London with producer No I.D., who Ashcroft sought after because he liked his work in the Jay-Z song "D.O.A. (Death of Auto-Tune)" and read an interview where he stated how many producers destroy records to boost sales.

In 2010, Ashcroft formed a band called RPA & The United Nations of Sound, who released a promo single, "Are You Ready?", from their debut album. The album United Nations of Sound (which had the working title Redemption) was released on Parlophone on 19 July 2010; "Born Again", the first proper single from the album, was released on the same day. The full album leaked on 15 July and the NME started streaming the album the following day.

On 15 October 2010, Ashcroft released through his website a second fanclub-only track, "Here We Go Again". On the same day the song "Are You Ready?" was released as the first official single from the album in the United States. During the same month Ashcroft had signed with the record company Razor & Tie in the United States. The radio edit of "Are You Ready?" was made available for free on the US version of Ashcroft's website.

The album United Nations of Sound was released across the Atlantic on 22 March 2011 under the name "Richard Ashcroft". The lead single "Are You Ready?" was featured over the closing credits of the film The Adjustment Bureau in March 2011, along with the new song "Future's Bright", written and performed specifically for the film's opening by Ashcroft and ten-time Oscar-nominated composer Thomas Newman.

For the US release of "Are You Ready?", Ashcroft and Big Life Management commissioned Giorgio Testi for the promo – created out of live footage from a show at Shepherd's Bush Empire. The video premiered on 7 February on the official website of Pulse Films, the production company.

On 1 March the song "Future's Bright" was premiered on Stereogum. A video created for the song by director George Nolfi was posted on the official website of the movie The Adjustment Bureau.

Ashcroft released his fifth studio album, These People, in May 2016. The album was followed by 2016 UK and Europe tour, an abbreviated North American tour, and—for the first time in Ashcroft's career—festival dates in Latin America.

In January 2018, it was confirmed that in June 2018, Ashcroft would be supporting Liam Gallagher at his two concerts in Malahide Castle and Gardens in Dublin and Belsonic at Ormeau Park in Belfast. In March 2018, it was announced that Ashcroft would tour with Gallagher in North America in May 2018. On 11 June 2018, it was announced that Ashcroft would support Gallagher at his show at Lancashire County Cricket Club on 18 August 2018.

In August 2018, Ashcroft announced his sixth solo album, Natural Rebel, which was released on 19 October, preceded by the single "Surprised by the Joy" in September and subsequent teasers "Born to Be Strangers" and "That's When I Feel It". The LP debuted at No. 4 on the UK Albums Chart, its highest position.

On 19 February 2021, he released a cover of John Lennon's "Bring On the Lucie (Freda Peeple)" (track 5 on Lennon's 1973 album Mind Games). On 29 October that year, he released his sixth album, Acoustic Hymns Vol. 1. It features acoustic versions of Ashcroft's songs with the Verve and his solo career. The album debuted at No. 2 on the UK Albums Chart, its peak position.

=== 2024–present ===
On 21 October 2024, it was announced that Ashcroft would be the supporting act to Oasis Live '25 UK reunion tour, which sold out in 10 hours.

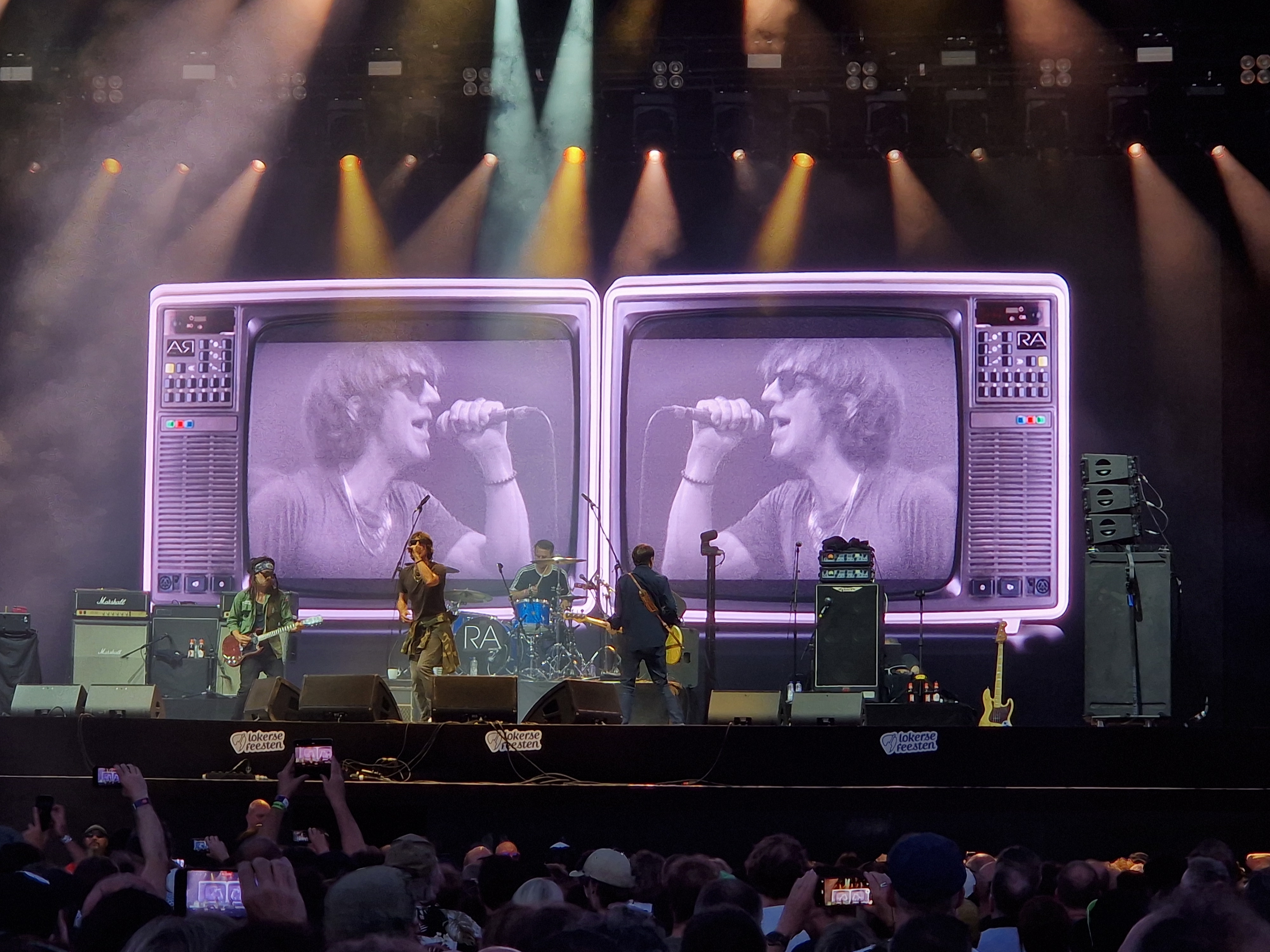
Ashcroft performing at Lokerse Feesten 2024

On 22 May 2025, he released "Lover". The song is based on sample from "Love and Affection" by Joan Armatrading. In an interview with Absolute Radio, he commented how he does not consider himself defined by any specific genre and just needs it to be "music". He expressed admiration for how samples can take on a life of their own and become new music. The song was produced by Emre Ramazanoglu and was accompanied by an announcement of an album, Lovin' You, which was released on 10 October 2025.

== Personal life ==
Ashcroft is married to Kate Radley, a former keyboardist of Spiritualized. They married in 1995 and it was years before it was publicly revealed that the pair had married. Together, they have two sons. The family lives in Taynton in Gloucestershire and Richmond in London. Ashcroft and Radley have collaborated professionally throughout their marriage and toured together with Coldplay in 2006. Radley has been the source of inspiration for many of his songs, including "Sonnet" from the album Urban Hymns.

Ashcroft is a Manchester United fan, and regularly attends matches.

Ashcroft is good friends with Noel and Liam Gallagher of the band Oasis. For a long time the Gallagher brothers have expressed great respect for Ashcroft, with Noel Gallagher fondly nicknaming Ashcroft 'Captain Rock'. The Oasis track "Cast No Shadow", from the successful 1995 album (What's the Story) Morning Glory? is dedicated to him. Ashcroft in turn dedicated the title track of A Northern Soul to Noel Gallagher. Ashcroft also provided backing vocals on the Oasis song "All Around the World" in 1997, for Oasis' Be Here Now.

In a 2006 interview, Ashcroft mentioned taking Prozac to help him with clinical depression, but said that it did not help, referring to the pills as "very, very synthetic." Ashcroft has said that he's always been "a depressive, someone who suffers from depression", and that music and creativity help him cope with his illness.

Ashcroft has abstained from large-scale touring until his two sons have grown up for wanting to be present for his family and has always preferred to stay out of commercial spotlights stating, "We're not a showbizy kind of band, we don't play the game where everyone else goes to specific parties to have their photograph taken, which sells magazines, that whole kind of game we're not really part of."

== Songwriting style and artistic influences ==
Ashcroft has a sustained interest for the psychological and affectual influence music holds, stating, "A great pop song is as powerful as the best piece of poetry you have ever read and the melody can take you to another place."

Ashcroft is well known for using string instrumentation in his songs. He considers it part of his "palette" and draws inspiration from such composers as Ennio Morricone, John Barry, and John Williams.

A major influence on Ashcroft from childhood to adulthood has been the Beatles. Ashcroft recalls two out of the three LPs his family owned when he was a child were the 1966 album Revolver, and the Beatles compilation album 1967–1970. He also recalls in his teens he used to watch an "unauthorised" video of the band on a loop. He has expressed a high regard for George Harrison's work with the Beatles and his solo work, as well as praise for his moral ideals and distaste for the fake nature of the music industry.

Ashcroft has highlighted the Smiths as a major influence in his teens, citing the album Hatful of Hollow and the song "How Soon Is Now?" as having a profound impact on him.

Ashcroft also holds a deep interest for cinema; when he was thirteen years of age, he was shown the Jean-Luc Godard film 1+1, which showed the Rolling Stones creating a song. Ashcroft mentions this event as a turning point in his life view.

In terms of literature, Ashcroft has been vastly influenced by the poet/polymath William Blake. He has also mentioned poet Phillip Larkin and A.E. Housman as some of his favorite poets.

== "Bittersweet Symphony" legal dispute ==
A legal dispute was held over Ashcroft's song "Bitter Sweet Symphony" from the Verve's album Urban Hymns, a song on which he was the sole band member to share a co-writing credit. The song uses a sample of Andrew Oldham Orchestra's recording of the Rolling Stones' 1965 song "The Last Time". The Verve had negotiated this legally, but the Rolling Stones' record company successfully sued and argued that they had used "too much". The Verve were subsequently forced to give ABKCO 100 percent of the royalties from "Bitter Sweet Symphony", and Mick Jagger and Keith Richards were given songwriting credits along with Ashcroft. Against Ashcroft's wishes, the song was used in a commercial advertisement; from this he received $175,000, but donated it all to charity despite it being the only revenue he had ever received from the song. On 23 May 2019, Ashcroft announced that Jagger and Richards had signed over the rights to him, giving him sole writing credit and all subsequent royalties.

== Awards and nominations ==
Year	Awards	Work	Category	Result
1998	Ivor Novello Awards	Himself	Songwriter of the Year	Won
1998	Denmark GAFFA Awards	Himself	Best Foreign Songwriter	Nominated
2000	Mercury Prize	Alone with Everybody	Album of the Year	Nominated
2000	NME Awards	Himself	Best Solo Artist	Nominated
2006	NME Awards	Himself	Best Solo Artist	Nominated
2011	UK Music Video Awards	Live at Shepherds Bush Empire	Best Live Music Coverage	Nominated
2017	NME Awards	Himself	Best British Male	Nominated
2019	Global Awards	Himself	Best Indie	Nominated
2019	Ivor Novello Awards	Himself	Outstanding Contribution to British Music	Won

== Discography ==
=== Albums ===
List of studio albums, with selected chart positions and certifications
Title	Album details	Peak chart positions										Certifications
Title	Album details	UK	AUS	AUT	FRA	GER	ITA	IRL	NL	SWI	US	Certifications
Alone with Everybody	Released: 26 June 2000; Label: Hut; Formats: LP, CD, cassette, download	1	10	18	28	10	4	5	41	39	127	BPI: Platinum
Human Conditions	Released: 21 October 2002; Label: Hut; Formats: LP, CD, cassette, download	3	70	48	67	14	24	11	—	51	—	BPI: Gold
Keys to the World	Released: 23 January 2006; Label: Parlophone; Formats: CD, download	2	54	7	78	6	11	6	49	7	—	BPI: Platinum; IRMA: Gold
These People	Released: 20 May 2016; Label: Righteous Phonographic Association, Cooking Vinyl, Harvest; Formats: LP, CD, download	3	—	70	134	51	34	17	92	32	—	BPI: Silver
Natural Rebel	Released: 19 October 2018; Label: Righteous Phonographic Association, BMG; Formats: LP, CD, cassette, download	4	—	71	—	82	42	18	—	47	—	
Acoustic Hymns Vol 1	Release: 29 October 2021; Label: Righteous Phonographic Association, BMG; Formats: LP, CD, cassette, download	2	—	64	194	37	—	23	—	39	—	
Lovin' You	Release: 10 October 2025; Label: Righteous Phonographic Association, Virgin Music Group; Formats: LP, CD, cassette, download	3	—	—	—	—	—	90	—	83	—	
"—" denotes a recording that did not chart or was not released in that territory.

=== Project album ===
List of project studio albums, with selected chart positions
Title	Album details	Peak chart positions			
Title	Album details	UK	AUT	GER	SWI
United Nations of Sound^{[A]}	Released: 19 July 2010; Label: Parlophone; Formats: LP, CD, download	20	63	49	50

=== Extended plays ===
List of extended plays
Title	EP details
Live from London	Released: 24 April 2006; Format: Download
Rare Vibration/Guided Halls	Released: 19 October 2018; Format: CD (HMV's exclusive market only)
Richard Ashcroft: Live Vol. 1	Released: 27 March 2026; Format: Download

=== Singles ===
List of singles, with selected chart positions, showing year released and album name
Title	Year	Peak chart positions										Album
Title	Year	UK	AUT	BEL (WA)	CAN	GER	ITA	IRL	NL	NZ	SWI	Album
"A Song for the Lovers"	2000	3	—	—	6	82	9	11	83	42	78	Alone with Everybody
"Money to Burn"	2000	17	—	—	—	—	—	38	—	—	—	Alone with Everybody
"C'mon People (We're Making It Now)"	2000	21	—	—	—	82	—	—	—	—	—	Alone with Everybody
"Check the Meaning"	2002	11	—	—	21	94	13	19	—	—	—	Human Conditions
"Science of Silence"	2003	14	—	—	—	—	31	—	—	—	—	Human Conditions
"Buy It in Bottles"	2003	26	—	—	—	—	—	—	—	—	—	Human Conditions
"Break the Night with Colour"	2006	3	17	48	—	45	3	10	90	—	55	Keys to the World
"Music Is Power"	2006	20	—	—	—	—	42	—	—	—	—	Keys to the World
"Words Just Get in the Way"	2006	40	—	—	—	—	—	—	—	—	—	Keys to the World
"Why Not Nothing?" / "Sweet Brother Malcolm"^{[B]}	2006	—	—	—	—	—	—	—	—	—	—	Keys to the World
"Born Again"^{[A]}	2010	—	—	—	—	—	—	—	—	—	—	United Nations of Sound
"Are You Ready?"^{[A]}	2010	—	—	—	—	—	—	—	—	—	—	United Nations of Sound
"This Is How It Feels"	2016	42	—	—	—	—	89	—	—	—	—	These People
"Hold On"	2016	—	—	—	—	—	—	—	—	—	—	These People
"They Don't Own Me"	2016	—	—	—	—	—	178	—	—	—	—	These People
"Out of My Body"	2016	—	—	—	—	—	—	—	—	—	—	These People
"These People"	2016	—	—	—	—	—	—	—	—	—	—	These People
"Surprised by the Joy"	2018	53	—	—	32	—	71	—	—	—	—	Natural Rebel
"Born to Be Strangers"	2018	—	—	—	66	—	23	44	—	—	—	Natural Rebel
"That's When I Feel It"	2018	—	—	—	—	—	—	—	—	—	—	Natural Rebel
"Bring On the Lucie (Freda Peeple)"	2021	—	—	—	—	—	—	—	—	—	—	Standalone single
"Lover"	2025	—	—	—	—	—	—	—	—	—	—	Lovin' You
"Lovin' You"	2025	—	—	—	—	—	—	—	—	—	—	Lovin' You
"—" denotes releases that did not chart or were not released in that territory.

==== Other releases ====
List of singles, showing year released and album name
Title	Year	Album
"The Journey"^{[C]}	2009	standalone single
"Are You Ready?"^{[D]}	2010	United Nations of Sound
"Future's Bright"^{[E]}	2011	movie soundtrack

== B-sides, bonus tracks, remixes, and rarities ==
=== Alone With Everybody era ===
- "(Could be) A Country Thing, City Thing, Blues Thing"
- "Precious Stone"
- "Leave Me High"
- "XXYY"
- "Make a Wish"
- "For the Lovers"
- "Einstein on a Beach"

=== Human Conditions era ===
- "The Miracle"
- "Get Up Now"
- "Don't Take Me In"
- "The Journey's Just Begun"
- "Check the Meaning" (Chris Potter Remix)
- "Check the Meaning" (The Freelance Hellraiser Remix)

=== Keys to the World era ===
- "The Direction"
- "75 Degrees"
- "Slip Sliding"
- "Circles"
- "Long Way Down"
- "Words Just Get in the Way" (Demo Version)
- "Break the Night with Colour" (Acoustic Version)
- "Music Is Power" (Acoustic Version)
- "She's So Hot" – Ashcroft performed this song at several concerts in 2006, though it has never been officially released on an album.

=== RPA & The United Nations of Sound era ===
- "Captain Rock" – iTunes exclusive bonus track.
- "Third Eye" – Released to RPA fan club members via Richard Ashcroft's official website; it also appears as track 9 on the US version of the album.
- "Here We Go Again" – Second song released to Richard Ashcroft fan club members.
- "Lead the Way" Third tune released to Richard Ashcroft fan club members.
- "Screw You Screw Me" Fourth and last song released to Richard Ashcroft fan club members.

=== These People era ===
- "How the West Was Lost"

=== Natural Rebel era ===
- "Hey Columbo"
- "Rare Vibration"
- "Gilded Halls"
- "Have Yourself a Merry Little Christmas" (Cover)

=== Acoustic Hymns era ===
- "C'mon People (We're Making It Now)" (feat. Liam Gallagher) (Don't Stop Now Mix)

=== Lovin' You era ===
On December 18, 2025, Ashcroft shared three bonus tracks for free on his official YouTube account:

- "Take It Back Home"
- "To Be Loved Again"
- "You've Got All I Need"

==== Guest appearances ====
List of guest appearances, with selected chart positions, showing year released and album name
Title	Year	Peak chart positions		Album
Title	Year	UK	IRL	Album
"Lonely Soul" (UNKLE, with Ashcroft on vocals)	1998	—	—	Psyence Fiction
"The Test" (The Chemical Brothers, with Ashcroft on vocals)	2002	14	36	Come with Us
"—" denotes releases that did not chart or were not released in that territory.

Notes

- A United Nations of Sound and the singles taken from it were released under Ashcroft's pseudonym "RPA & The United Nations of Sound". However, in the United States, the album was released under the name "Richard Ashcroft – United Nations of Sound".
- B "Why Not Nothing?" / "Sweet Brother Malcolm" was a limited 7" release.
- C "The Journey" was a charity single for Helen Bamber Foundation.
- D "Are You Ready?" was a released as a limited edition UK promo CD and vinyl.
- E "Future's Bright?", Richard Ashcroft teamed up with the American film score composer Thomas Newman to pen this song for the opening credits of the 2011 movie, The Adjustment Bureau.
