= Break the Night with Colour =

2006 single by Richard Ashcroft

- 7-inch and CD cover

Single by Richard Ashcroft

from the album Keys to the World
- B-side: "The Direction"; "Slip Sliding"
- Released: 9 January 2006
- Length: 3:56
- Label: Parlophone
- Songwriter(s): Richard Ashcroft
- Producer(s): Richard Ashcroft; Chris Potter

Richard Ashcroft singles chronology
"Buy It in Bottles" (2003)	"Break the Night with Colour" (2006)	"Music Is Power" (2006)

Alternative cover
- DVD

"Break the Night with Colour" is a song by English singer-songwriter Richard Ashcroft, included as the third track on his third studio album, Keys to the World (2006). It was released as the first single from the album on 9 January 2006, peaking at number three on the UK Singles Chart. It also found success in several other countries, reaching number three in Italy, number 10 in Ireland, and number 17 in Austria.

== Track listings ==
UK CD single and limited-edition 7-inch single

1. "Break the Night with Colour"
2. "The Direction"

UK DVD single

1. "Break the Night with Colour"
2. "Slip Sliding"
3. "Break the Night with Colour" (video)
4. "Break the Night with Colour" (making of the video)

== Charts ==
=== Weekly charts ===
Chart (2006)	Peak position
Austria (Ö3 Austria Top 40)	17
Belgium (Ultratip Bubbling Under Flanders)	2
Belgium (Ultratip Bubbling Under Wallonia)	8
Europe (Eurochart Hot 100)	10
Germany (GfK)	45
Ireland (IRMA)	10
Italy (FIMI)	3
Netherlands (Single Top 100)	90
Scotland (OCC)	3
Switzerland (Schweizer Hitparade)	55
UK Singles (OCC)	3

=== Year-end charts ===
Chart (2006)	Position
UK Singles (OCC)	106
