= Keys to the World =

Studio album by Richard Ashcroft
- Released: 23 January 2006
- Recorded: State of the Ark, 2005
- Genre: Post-Britpop; folk rock
- Length: 44:18
- Label: Parlophone
- Producer: Chris Potter; Richard Ashcroft

Richard Ashcroft chronology
Human Conditions (2002)	Keys to the World (2006)	United Nations of Sound (2010)

Singles from Keys to the World
- 1. "Break the Night with Colour" Released: 9 January 2006; 2. "Music Is Power" Released: 17 April 2006; 3. "Words Just Get in the Way" Released: 10 July 2006; 4. ""Why Not Nothing?" / "Sweet Brother Malcolm"" Released: 4 December 2006

Keys to the World is the third studio album by English singer-songwriter Richard Ashcroft. It was released 23 January 2006, reaching number 2 in the UK Albums Chart (see 2006 in British music). Ashcroft worked on the album at State of the Ark Studios and Julian Kershaw wrote string arrangements for some of the songs later recorded by London Metropolitan Orchestra. Strings are featured on eight songs on the album which also features electric viola on some tracks – played by Bruce White. The engineer/producer of this album was Chris Potter, and being his final solo album for a decade, until These People (2016).

== Release and reception ==
Professional ratings
Aggregate scores
Source	Rating
Metacritic	52/100
Review scores
Source	Rating
AllMusic	3/5 stars
Drowned in Sound	6/10
The Guardian	2/5 stars
NME	6/10
Pitchfork	2.0/10
PopMatters	5/10
Q	3/5 stars
Rolling Stone	2/5 stars
Slant Magazine	3.5/5 stars
Uncut	4/5 stars

Keys to the World was met with "mixed or average" reviews from critics. At Metacritic, which assigns a weighted average rating out of 100 to reviews from mainstream publications, this release received an average score of 52 based on 19 reviews.

In a review for AllMusic, Thom Jurek wrote: "Three and a half years later, the Verve's former frontman is back with a record not terribly different, though certainly more pastoral and perhaps more middle of the road. The rest of the disc simply follows a formula, though it's a pleasant one. Ashcroft introduces everything else here with skeletally placed guitars, pours on the strings, and keeps the tempo on slow, slower, and slowest until the final track." At Drowned in Sound, critic Dom Gourlay wrote: "Keys to the World then is a deeply personal, occasionally lifeless but equally insightful passage into the latest chapter of Richard Ashcroft's life story. Doing what he does best but just be prepared for some very uneasy listening." Scott Shetler of Slant Magazine wrote: "Keys to the World, is his best solo effort to date, adding punchy melodies to the insightful lyrics and strong vocals that are characteristic of his music. Keys to the World is a definite step forward and demonstrates that Ashcroft is finally hitting his stride as a solo artist."

The album was certified Platinum by the British Phonographic Industry, selling more than 300,000 copies.

== Track listing ==
Keys to the World track listing
No.	Title	Writer(s)	Length
1.	"Why Not Nothing?"	Richard Ashcroft	4:09
2.	"Music Is Power"	Ashcroft; Curtis Mayfield	3:58
3.	"Break the Night with Colour"	Ashcroft	3:56
4.	"Words Just Get in the Way"	Ashcroft	4:53
5.	"Keys to the World"	Ashcroft	4:42
6.	"Sweet Brother Malcolm"	Ashcroft	4:51
7.	"Cry Til the Morning"	Ashcroft	5:04
8.	"Why Do Lovers?"	Ashcroft	4:45
9.	"Simple Song"	Ashcroft	4:05
10.	"World Keeps Turning"	Ashcroft	3:55

iTunes bonus track
No.	Title	Length
11.	"Break the Night With Colour" (Live at Kings College)	4:58

Japanese bonus track
No.	Title	Length
11.	"75 Degrees"	4:48

DVD version
No.	Title	Length
1.	"Keys to the World (The Interview)"
2.	"Break the Night With Colour (live video)"
3.	"Why Not Nothing? (live video)"
4.	"Words Just Get in the Way (live video)"
5.	"Break the Night With Colour (video)"

== Personnel ==
- Richard Ashcroft – vocals, guitar, keyboards, design
- Arnie Somogyi, John Giblin, Martyn Campbell – bass
- Terry Britten – guitar, bass, mandolin
- Martin Slattery – piano
- Gerry Conway, Peter Salisbury, Steve Sidelnyk – drums
- Jon Hunt – saxophone, flute
- Richard Robson – programming
- Bruce White – electric viola on "Why Not Nothing?"
- Chris Parkes – French horn on "Words Just Get in the Way"
- Chris West – acoustic guitar on "Keys to the World"
- Yvonne John-Lewis – additional vocals on "Keys to the World"
- Nick Cooper, Andrew Haveron, Andy Brown, Benjamin Nabarro, Cathy Giles, Chris Fish, Chris Vanderspar, David Juritz, Debbie Widdup, Edward Vanderspar, Fenella Barton, Helen Hathorn, Joel Hunter, Jonathan Tunnell, Laura Melhuish, Martin Burgess, Matthew Ward, Nicholas Holland, Rachel Roberts, Richard George, Thomas Kemp – strings
- Julian Kershaw – string arrangements

== Release details ==
Country	Date	Label	Format	Catalog
Japan	12 January 2006	Toshiba-EMI	CD	TOCP-66502 / 4988006838161
United Kingdom	23 January 2006	Parlophone	CD	3483732 / 0946 3 48373 2 3
United Kingdom	23 January 2006	Parlophone	CD/DVD (CD)	3545202 / 0946 3 54520 2 0
United Kingdom	23 January 2006	Parlophone	CD/DVD (DVD)	3503812 / 0946 3 50381 9 4
Australia	6 February 2006	Capitol Records	Copy Controlled CD	3531382 / 0946 3 53138 2 6
Canada	7 February 2006	Parlophone	CD	0946 3 48373 2 3
Argentina	7 March 2006	Parlophone	Copy controlled CD	0946 3 53138 2 6
United States	21 March 2006	Virgin Records	CD/DVD	0946 3 54523 2 7

== Charts ==
=== Weekly charts ===
Chart (2006)	Peak position
Austrian Albums (Ö3 Austria)	7
Belgian Albums (Ultratop Flanders)	10
Belgian Albums (Ultratop Wallonia)	45
Dutch Albums (Album Top 100)	49
French Albums (SNEP)	78
German Albums (Offizielle Top 100)	6
Irish Albums (IRMA)	6
Italian Albums (FIMI)	11
Scottish Albums (OCC)	2
Spanish Albums (PROMUSICAE)	62
Swiss Albums (Schweizer Hitparade)	7
UK Albums (OCC)	2

=== Year-end charts ===
Chart (2006)	Position
Belgian Albums (Ultratop Flanders)	87
UK Albums (OCC)	71

== Certifications ==
Region	Certification	Certified units/sales
United Kingdom (BPI)	Platinum	300,000^{^}
^{^} Shipments figures based on certification alone.
