= Chris Potter (music producer) =

British record producer and mixer

Chris Potter is a British record producer and mixer, most known for his work as long-term collaborator and producer of the Verve and Richard Ashcroft.

Potter started his career at Maison Rouge Studios in London, where he worked his way up through the ranks to chief engineer. After several successful years there, he left to further his career as a freelance producer and mixer. He has worked with many artists of note including the Rolling Stones and U2 and won a Brit Award for Best Producer in 1998 for his work on the Verve's Urban Hymns. After enjoying worldwide success with his productions and mixes on Urban Hymns, he continued to work with Richard Ashcroft on his solo albums. He produced and mixed Ashcroft's debut album Alone with Everybody, the follow-up Human Conditions, the third album Keys to the World, and his fifth album These People. Other credits include the Rolling Stones (three albums including Steel Wheels), mixing U2, producing for I am Kloot and Blur, and mixing for Keane. He also mixed 10 tracks on the Feeling's album Twelve Stops and Home. Potter produced and mixed the Verve's album Forth, including the first single "Love Is Noise". He also produced and mixed for the Rifles, the Plea, Sound of Guns, the Chakras, White Belt Yellow Tag, King Charles and the Zombies.

Among the other artists that Potter has worked with include Fortune Drive, Story One, the Clash, Flowered Up, Mick Jagger, Whale, Gabrielle, Heather Nova, the Orb, Tina Dico, Eagle Eye Cherry, Paul McCartney, Feeder, Archive, Diesel Park West, Mega City Four, Jack Savoretti, the Grid and Yusuf Islam.
