= Dead and Gone (EP) =

EP by Stabbing Westward
- Released: January 3, 2020
- Recorded: 2019
- Genre: Industrial rock
- Label: Drugstore
- Producers: Christopher Hall, Walter Flakus

Stabbing Westward EP chronology
Stabbing Westward (2001)	Dead and Gone (2020)	Hallowed Hymns (2020)

Singles from Dead and Gone
- 1. "Dead and Gone" Released: January 3, 2020

Dead and Gone is an EP by American industrial rock band Stabbing Westward, released on January 3, 2020 through Drugstore Records. It is the band's first release since 2001's Stabbing Westward.

== Background ==
Stabbing Westward released its self-titled fourth album on May 22, 2001. The single "So Far Away" received moderate radio play on rock stations, but the album was a commercial failure. The band would breakup in early 2002, with most of the band members pursuing other projects. After the band's split, Christopher Hall would commit full-time to The Dreaming, which he co-founded with Johnny Haro. Rumors of Stabbing Westward reuniting started to form in June 2010, but nothing came of this. Walter Flakus would reunite with Hall in November 2013, performing with The Dreaming at a show in Las Vegas. Stabbing Westward officially reformed in 2016 to play two live shows to coincide with the band's 30th anniversary. The lineup for the reunited band consisted of Christopher Hall (vocals, guitar), Walter Flakus (keyboards, programming), Mark Eliopulos (guitar, backing vocals), Carlton Bost (bass), and Johnny Haro (drums). Stabbing Westward went on several tours throughout 2017 and 2018 and released the new song "Home in You" for the Cold Waves VI compilation on September 28, 2017. Haro was fired from the band in 2018 and replaced by former Orgy drummer Bobby Amaro; Haro's departure from Stabbing Westward also coincided with The Dreaming breaking up. In 2019, the band released a re-recorded version of the Iwo Jesus EP. In June of that year, the band announced that they were working on a new album and that Eliopulos had left the band.

The Dead and Gone EP was released in January 2020. Ultimately, the three non-remix songs appeared on the band's subsequent full-length album in 2021, Chasing Ghosts, albeit with minimal changes.

== Reception ==
Professional ratings
Review scores
Source	Rating
AllMusic	3.5/5 stars
Blabbermouth.net	8/10

Dead and Gone has received positive reviews.

AllMusic's Neil Z. Yeung stated that the EP doesn't miss a beat and contains "all the hallmarks that made them underrated favorites in their brief late-'90s run." Yeung favorably compared the title track to previous singles "Shame" and "Save Yourself". Yeung praised Hall's vocals on "Crawl", a re-worked song originally by The Dreaming, saying his vocals "haven't aged a day."

The EP was included on AllMusic's "Best of 2020" list.

== Track listing ==
Dead and Gone track listing
No.	Title	Length
1.	"Dead and Gone"	4:12
2.	"Cold"	4:29
3.	"Crawl"	3:43
4.	"Dead and Gone" (StoneburnerRemix)	4:32
5.	"Cold" (StabWalts 12" Dance Mix)	5:25

== Personnel ==
Stabbing Westward

- Christopher Hall - lead vocals, guitars, keyboards, drum machine programming
- Walter Flakus - keyboards, programming, backing vocals
- Carlton Bost - bass
- Bobby Amaro - drums

== See also ==
- List of 2020 albums
