= The Wreckard =

Studio album by Prick
- Released: February 28, 2002
- Recorded: 1996–2000; various locations in London, England
- Length: 46:47
- Label: Lucky Pierre Music
- Producers: Kevin McMahon, Warne Livesey

Prick chronology
Prick (1995)	The Wreckard (2002)

The Wreckard is the second studio album by American industrial rock band Prick. It was released online on February 28, 2002, via frontman Kevin McMahon's own record label, Lucky Pierre Music. The album was produced by McMahon and British record producer Warne Livesey, who produced Prick's self-titled 1995 debut album.

The production of the album was rejected by Prick's previous record labels Nothing/Interscope Records due to creative differences and the labels' commercial expectations. It sold 3,000 copies in the first three months of its release without any promotion other than word of mouth. At the same year of its release, McMahon has assembled a new line-up for Prick, which featured guitarist Greg Zydyk, former Lucky Pierre bassist Tom Lash and former Stabbing Westward drummer Andy Kubiszewski. The band toured in between 2002 and 2003 to promote the album.

== Background ==
After supporting David Bowie and Nine Inch Nails' Outside Tour in 1995, Prick entered a hiatus. In 1996, Kevin McMahon played guitar alongside Nine Inch Nails on Nights of Nothing tour and performed Prick tracks with them. After 1996, he relocated in London to record the new Prick album and recorded demos with Prick drummer Garrett Hammond. Nevertheless, in the wake of the recording sessions, Nine Inch Nails manager John Malm Jr., told McMahon that Interscope Records wasn't going to support the production of new album, as the label wanted more commercial and radio-friendly songs. This was contested by McMahon, who refused to conform to the record company. This eventually caused a fallout between McMahon and Nothing Records. In an inverview with The Plain Dealer in 2002, he stated:

There was never any real blowout with Trent. The day before I was supposed to begin recording the second album, the label decided they didn't want to do it. They wanted more radio-friendly songs. And since I don't listen to the radio, I didn't know what they were talking about. I can't write songs that someone wants me to write.

McMahon independently worked on the demos, with the aid of Hammond and British producer Warne Livesey, who produced Prick's self-titled debut album. In 1999, he managed to get the rights for his songs back from Interscope. Then he started working on the publishing arrangements, which he described as "a long death."

In the winter of 2000 and 2001, two tracks, "Wet Cat" and "I Know It's Going to Hurt" were posted online. These were followed by the online release of the album.

== Critical reception ==
Professional ratings
Review scores
Source	Rating
The Phoenix	3/4 stars

Annie Zaleski of The Phoenix gave the album a positive review, stating: " Like Reznor’s ambitiously experimental Nine Inch Nails disc The Fragile (nothing/Interscope), The Wreckard forgoes radio-friendly industrial rock for severely twisted sonic foundations and a radical cut-and-paste æsthetic." She also wrote: "On the easier-listening side, McMahon balances the noise storms with artfully Bowie-esque pop songs."

== Track listing ==
All songs written by Kevin McMahon.

1. "Three Rings" – 3:45
2. "Wet Cat" – 3:06
3. "Into My Arms" – 3:37
4. "I Know It's Gonna Hurt" – 2:03
5. "Godfather" – 3:48
6. "Object" – 2:45
7. "Actress" – 2:21
8. "House Husband" – 4:15
9. "Without It" – 2:45
10. "My Analyst Says" – 4:17
11. "Darling Dead" – 2:42
12. "Humanerace" – 3:20
13. "Tomorrow" – 4:06
14. "Universe" – 3:57

== Personnel ==
Prick

- Kevin McMahon – vocals, production, engineering, mixing (3–5, 7, 10–11, 13–14); recording (10, 14); guitar (1–13); bass (1–2, 4–12); keyboards (1–13); drum programming (1–2, 4–6, 8–11); piano (14); noises (14)
- Garrett Hammond – guitar (1, 7, 9); bass (1, 4, 7); drums (1, 4, 7, 9, 14); drum programming (1); percussion (6); sampler (6); noises (14); backing vocals (1, 7, 9, 14); mixing (1, 4, 7–9, 14); recording (1, 4, 7, 9, 14)

Additional musicians

- John Guciardo – guitar (10)
- Gary King – drums (3, 13)
- Warne Livesey – bass (3, 13); drum programming (3, 13); production (3, 13); mixing (3, 13); recording (3, 13)
- Num Struggles – guitar (6); drums (12); mixing (1–2, 6, 8–12); recording (1–2, 4–12)

Other personnel

- Greg Zydyk – mastering; additional engineering (7)
- Frank Vale – mastering
- Jim Bryant – additional engineering (7)
