= Prick (Prick album) =

Studio album by Prick
- Released: January 25, 1995
- Recorded: 1992–1994
- Studios: Le Pig (Los Angeles), various locations in New Orleans and London
- Genres: Industrial rock, alternative rock
- Length: 43:03
- Label: Nothing/Interscope
- Producers: Warne Livesey, Trent Reznor

Prick chronology
Prick (1995)	The Wreckard (2002)

Singles from Prick
- 1. "Communiqué"/"Crack" Released: 1994 (promotional); 2. "Animal" Released: 1995 (promotional)

Prick is the debut album by American industrial rock band, Prick, fronted by Kevin McMahon. It was released on January 25, 1995 via Nothing Records, Nine Inch Nails founder Trent Reznor's vanity label and a subdivision of Interscope Records. The album was produced by Warne Livesey and Reznor, who also engineered on four tracks.

The album sold 66,000 copies. The tracks "Communiqué"/"Crack" and "Animal" were released as singles. "Animal" became a minor alternative radio hit and was accompanied by a music video. A follow-up album, The Wreckard, was released independently in 2002 after it was rejected by Interscope Records due to creative differences and the band was unsigned from the label. In 2017, the album was reissued on vinyl through Trent Reznor's Null Corporation label and made available for digital download via the ITunes Store.

== Background and recording ==
In 1992, Kevin McMahon started an unnamed project after his previous new wave band Lucky Pierre disbanded. He recorded four demo songs with Trent Reznor, a longtime friend and a former Lucky Pierre member who founded Nine Inch Nails. These songs were recorded in Reznor's Le Pig studio and in New Orleans. The title track from Lucky Pierre's 1988 Communiqué EP, which featured Reznor on backing vocals, was also re-recorded as a demo. After Reznor fully committed himself to the recording of Nine Inch Nails' second studio album, The Downward Spiral, McMahon went to England and collaborated with British producer Warne Livesey to finish the album.

Meanwhile, he assembled a line-up for his band, which featured guitarist Chris Schleyer and drummer Andy Kubiszewski, who was known for fronting Exotic Birds. McMahon recorded eight songs with them and six of these tracks appeared on the album. The band signed to Nothing Records of Interscope, a vanity label founded by Reznor and former Lucky Pierre manager John Malm Jr. After the contract was sold to Nothing Records, Reznor and McMahon considered re-recording their previous demos. Nevertheless, the demo tracks were eventually kept in the album, due to lack of time and delays in the project.

== Critical reception ==
Professional ratings
Review scores
Source	Rating
AllMusic	4/5 stars
Collector's Guide to Heavy Metal	7/10

Bradley Torreano of Allmusic gave the album a positive review, describing it as "a blustering, angry album that works despite its tendencies to drag." He also added: "Although the album as a whole does have moments where McMahon gets overbearing, this is a record that never quite got its due upon its original release and deserves a second chance."

== Track listing ==
All songs written by Kevin McMahon.

1. "Communiqué" – 4:04
2. "Riverhead" – 4:39
3. "Tough" – 3:57
4. "Other People" – 3:20
5. "No Fair Fights" – 4:56
6. "Animal" – 4:10
7. "I Got It Bad" – 3:46
8. "I Apologise" – 2:48
9. "Crack" – 4:35
10. "Makebelieve" – 6:48

== Personnel ==
Prick

- Kevin McMahon – vocals, guitar, bass, programming, drums
- Chris Schleyer – guitar
- Andy Kubiszewski – drums

Technical personnel

- Trent Reznor – production (1, 3–5); engineering (1, 3–5)
- Warne Livesey – production (2, 6–10)
- Richard Norris – engineering, recording (2, 6–10)
- Tom Baker – mastering
- Alan Moulder – mixing
- Adrian Harrow – assistant engineering
- Brian Liesegang – assistant engineering
- Chris Vrenna – assistant engineering
- Darren Allison – assistant engineering
- Lorraine Francis – assistant engineering
- Matt Howe – assistant engineering
- Shelley Saunders – assistant engineering
- Steve Bush – assistant engineering (2)
- Tracii Sherman – assistant engineering

Other personnel

- Roger Von Golling – artwork
- Gary Talpas – artwork, sleeve coordination
