= Lucky Pierre (band) =

American new wave band

- Origin: Cleveland, Ohio, United States
- Genres: New wave, alternative rock, post-punk
- Years active: 1974–1984, 1988–1990, 2004–present
- Labels: Lucky Pierre Music, Banana, Unadulterated
- Members: Kevin McMahon
- Past members: John Guardico; Brian Dempsey; Denis DeVito; Gary Shay; Tom Lash; Dave Zima; Tom Miller; Trent Reznor; Rick Christyson
- Website: luckyprick.net

Lucky Pierre is a new wave band, founded in Cleveland in 1974 by singer-songwriter, guitarist and the only constant member, Kevin McMahon. The initial line-up of the band included McMahon on vocals, John Guardico on guitar, Dennis DeVito on bass and Brian Dempsey on drums. The band has released a string of singles in between the late 1970s and early 1980s, before entering to a hiatus and reforming in 1988, with guitarist Rick Christyson and keyboardist Trent Reznor, the founder of the industrial rock act Nine Inch Nails.

In 2004, McMahon reformed Lucky Pierre as a solo project to release its debut album, ThinKing.

== History ==
The band started as Lakewood native Kevin McMahon's solo project. He started recording demos in 1974, while his brother, Brian McMahon, was a member of the protopunk band Electric Eels. The first line-up of the band as an act included John Guardico on guitar, Denis DeVito on bass and Brian Dempsey on drums.

The band started performing in 1976 during the early new wave scene, which included the likes of Elvis Costello, Squeeze, Hammer Damage, Chi-Pig, and Devo. The band was also associated with Pere Ubu, a band which they performed with. Nevertheless, the band struggled to find venues for most of the time, as the band played McMahon's own compositions.

After three years, Dempsey left the band to pursue other interests. Gary Shay briefly joined the band as a drummer and the band released "Fans & Cameras"/"Idlewood" single, on their own record label Unadultered Records, which sold more than a thousand copies. Shay left the band soon after and Dempsey was asked to return. The band now consisted of McMahon, Dempsey, Guardico, DeVito and Tom Lash who was brought in on bass plus Tom Miller on Keyboards. DeVito switched to rhythm guitar after the addition of bassist Tom Lash, who was a music director at WCSB, the college radio station of Cleveland State University. He played the band's demo on the station, which helped their music to be exposed to a receptive audience. This version of the band played out for about a year mostly at The Coach House in Cleveland Hts and its old stomping grounds, The Pirate's Cove. It disbanded after McMahon came into a rehearsal stating he was moving to California and that the band could either stay together and rehearse in case something happened (a contract) or do whatever they wanted but that he could no longer live in a city where no one appreciated his music. McMahon left town and the band members decided to go their separate ways. Some time passed and McMahon returned to Cleveland. By this time John Guardico was living in California and Dempsey was playing in several projects, The band reformed with DeVito on lead guitar, Lash on bass, McMahon and newcomer Dave Zima on drums. This was followed by "Into My Arms", which featured a b-side "Match", which was recorded live on July 16, 1980 at the band's only WMMS Coffee Break Concert. The group then added the keyboardist Tom Miller to its line-up.

After releasing the third single, "Stetson's"/"Once A Child", in 1981, the band opened for the Plasmatics at Cleveland Agora. The gig ended harshly, with Plasmatics lead singer Wendy O. Williams being arrested for indecent exposure. The band also opened for Peter Frampton at the Public Auditorium in Cleveland in 1982. Following this performance, DeVito left the band, leaving the guitar duties to McMahon and the new band member Tom Sheridan. The band remained active until 1984; soon McMahon moved to San Francisco, leaving the band inactive for four years.

In 1988, McMahon returned to Cleveland to reform Lucky Pierre. The new line-up featured previous members Lash and Zima, as well as guitarist Rick Christyson and keyboardist Trent Reznor of Exotic Birds and The Innocent, who would be known for his future music act, Nine Inch Nails. The band recorded one EP Comminuque, which featured a guest appearance by the past member John Guardico, at the same year. Trent Reznor performed with the band for six months, before being immersed in the recording of Nine Inch Nails' debut album, Pretty Hate Machine. He left the band in 1989 to concentrate on it and the band's manager, John Malm Jr. started to manage Nine Inch Nails. In 1990, the band officially disbanded after a final gig.

After Lucky Pierre, McMahon formed the industrial rock band, Prick, featuring guitarist Chris Schleyer and Stabbing Westward drummer and Exotic Birds frontman Andy Kubiszewski. The band signed to Trent Reznor's own vanity record label, Nothing Records and released a self-titled album, produced by Reznor. The band was then dropped by Nothing's parent label, Interscope Records and released its second album The Wreckard independently in 2002.

In 2004, McMahon reformed Lucky Pierre as a sole member and released its debut album, ThinKing, via his own record label Lucky Pierre Music.

== Members ==
Current members

- Kevin McMahon – vocals, guitar, bass, drums, keyboards (1974–1984, 1988–1990, 2004–present)

Past members

- John Guardico – guitar (1974–1979)
- Brian Dempsey – drums (1974–1979)
- Denis DeVito – guitar (1977–1982); bass (1975–1977)
- Gary Shay – drums (1978)
- Tom Lash – bass (1978–1984, 1988–1990)
- Dave Zima – drums (1979–1984, 1988–1990)
- Tom Miller – keyboards (1978–1984)
- Trent Reznor – keyboards, saxophone, backing vocals (1988–1989)
- Rick Christyson – guitar (1988–1990)

== Discography ==
Studio albums

- ThinKing (2004, Lucky Pierre Music)

EPs

- Communiqué (1988, Banana Records)

Singles

- "Fans & Cameras" / "Idlewood" (1979, Unadulterated Records)
- "Into My Arms" / "Match" (1980, Unadulterated Records)
- "Stetson's" / "Once A Child" (1981, Unadulterated Records)
- Cool Summer Night" / "Chilly Willy" (1983, Unadulterated Records)
- "Communiqué" (1984, Unadulterated Records)
- "Muchacha Latina Today" / "Birdman" (1984, Banana Records)

Compilation albums

- Lucky Pierre (2009, Lucky Pierre Music)

Music videos

- "Attitude" (2009)
- "Fire on the Red Line" (2012)
