= Dead and Gone (disambiguation) =

"Dead and Gone" is a 2009 song by T.I., featuring Justin Timberlake.

Dead and Gone may also refer to:

== Music ==
- Dead and Gone (EP), an EP by American rock band Stabbing Westward
- Dead and Gone, a band from This Is Berkeley, Not West Bay
- "Dead and Gone", a song by the Black Keys from the album El Camino
- "Dead and Gone", a song by Gypsy from the 1971 album Gypsy
- "Dead and Gone", a song by Rancid from the 2012 album B Sides and C Sides
- "Dead and Gone", a song by Shadows Fall from the 2009 album Retribution
- "Dead and Gone", a song by Sonic Syndicate from the 2010 album We Rule the Night
- "Dead and Gone", a song by State Champs from the 2018 album Living Proof
- "Dead and Gone", a song by Trivium from the 2015 album Silence in the Snow

== Literature ==
- Dead and Gone (novel), a novel by Charlaine Harris
- Dead and Gone, a 1999 crime novel by Dorothy Simpson

== Entertainment ==
- "Dead and Gone", an episode of the TV series NYPD Blue

== See also ==
- The Dead and the Gone, a science fiction novel by Susan Beth Pfeffer
