= What Do I Have to Do? (disambiguation) =

"What Do I Have to Do" is a song by Kylie Minogue.

What Do I Have to Do? may also refer to:

- What Do I Have to Do? (album), a compilation album by Stabbing Westward
- "What Do I Have to Do?" (Stabbing Westward song), 1996
- "What Do I Have to Do", a song by Crystal Shawanda from Dawn of a New Day
- "What Do I Have to Do?" (1937 song), a Tin Pan Alley song by Bob Rothberg and Joseph Meyer
