= Timothy Adams =

Timothy or Tim Adams may refer to:

- Timothy D. Adams (born 1961), Undersecretary of the U.S. Department of the Treasury 2005–2007
- Timothy Adams (actor) (born 1967), American actor and model
- Timothy Adams (poker player) (born 1986), Canadian poker player
- Timothy Adams Jr. (born 1969), American educator; professor of music

== See also ==
- Tim Adams Memorial Trophy
