= Ungod =

Studio album by Stabbing Westward
- Released: February 15, 1994
- Recorded: 1993
- Studios: Eden Studios, London, England
- Genres: Industrial rock; alternative rock
- Length: 53:03
- Label: Columbia
- Producer: John Fryer

Stabbing Westward chronology
Iwo Jesus (1992)	Ungod (1994)	Wither Blister Burn & Peel (1996)

Singles from Ungod
- 1. "Violent Mood Swings" Released: December 1, 1993; 2. "Control" Released: 1994; 3. "Lies" Released: November 1, 1994; 4. "Nothing" Released: 1994

Professional ratings
Review scores
Source	Rating
AllMusic	2.5/5 stars
Rock Hard	8/10
Sputnikmusic	3.3/5 stars

Ungod is the debut album by American industrial rock band Stabbing Westward, released by Columbia Records. The album spawned the singles "Violent Mood Swings", "Nothing", "Lies", and "Control". Ungod ultimately became the band's only album to feature guitarist Stuart Zechman and drummer David Suycott.

== Background ==
Vocalist Christopher Hall and keyboardist Walter Flakus initially formed Stabbing Westward in 1985, with guitarist Jim Clanin, in Macomb, Illinois. In 1990, Hall and Flakus moved to Chicago. They revamped the band's lineup with live drummer Angelo Negrette, guitarist Andrew Hunter, and bassist Jim Sellers. The band recorded a demo EP, Iwo Jesus, in 1991. By 1992, Chris Vrenna had replaced Negrette on drums and Stuart Zechman had replaced Hunter on guitar. This lineup of the band recorded a demo tape, which included the songs "Violent Mood Swings", "Lies", and "Nothing". Just days before a showcase concert for the major label Columbia Records, Vrenna departed from the band in order to focus full-time on Nine Inch Nails. As a quick replacement, David Suycott was brought in at the last minute (Suycott was a high school friend of Flakus). After the showcase concert, Columbia signed the band, and they went on their first major tour in late 1993 as openers for Front 242.

The band's debut album, eventually given the title Ungod, was recorded in six weeks in Chiswick, UK. John Fryer served as producer, as Fryer had worked alongside other electronic acts such as Depeche Mode, Nine Inch Nails, and Clan of Xymox. Zechman had described the album's title as "...not at all religious or spiritual. It's just a name I made up for what the album is about. It's about losing your mind, your identity, loving and hating too much—that state of mind." Ungod was released by Columbia on February 15, 1994. Although Ungod was not a mainstream success, the singles had found airplay on college radio. They also appeared in numerous films and soundtracks.

Earlier in 1993, Zechman was jamming with the then-new band Filter, which consisted of Nine Inch Nails' studio programmer Brian Liesegang and Nine Inch Nails' live guitarist Richard Patrick. Zechman had created a distinct guitar riff, which was eventually used for Filter's breakout song "Hey Man Nice Shot" in 1995; however, the riff had first appeared on Ungod, during the chorus of the song "Ungod". Stabbing Westward had ultimately recorded and released their song prior to Filter's track.

Stabbing Westward toured alongside the likes of Depeche Mode, Rage Against the Machine, Quicksand, and Killing Joke. During the midst of the touring cycle, Suycott abruptly departed from the band. Andy Kubiszewski was brought in with little notice to finish the tour (Stabbing Westward's manager had also managed The The, a band that Kubiszewski played in beforehand). Kubiszewski ultimately learned all of Suycott's parts within a day, and thus he became a permanent fixture of the band. After the touring cycle for Ungod ended in 1995, the band started sessions for their second album; however, personal differences surfaced between Hall and Zechman, which led to the latter's departure from the band.

== Reception ==
In 2005, Ungod was ranked number 425 in Rock Hard magazine's book of The 500 Greatest Rock & Metal Albums of All Time.

== Track listing ==
No.	Title	Writer(s)	Length
1.	"Lost"	Zechman, Hall, Suycott	3:21
2.	"Control"	Zechman, Hall	3:39
3.	"Nothing"	Zechman, Hall	4:50
4.	"ACF"	Zechman, Hall	4:43
5.	"Lies"	Zechman, Hall, Suycott, Sellers, Flakus	4:43
6.	"Ungod"	Zechman, Hall	7:43
7.	"Throw"	Zechman, Hall	5:24
8.	"Violent Mood Swings"	Zechman, Hall, Suycott, Sellers, Flakus	5:12
9.	"Red on White"	Zechman	5:20
10.	"Can't Happen Here"	Zechman, Hall, Suycott, Sellers, Flakus	8:26
Total length:			53:26

== Personnel ==
- Christopher Hall – vocals, keyboards
- Stuart Zechman – guitars, bass
- Jim Sellers – bass
- Walter Flakus – keyboards
- David Suycott – drums, percussion

== Appearances ==
- "Violent Mood Swings (Thread Mix)" was featured in the soundtrack to the 1994 film Clerks.
- "Nothing" appeared in the movie Bad Boys in 1995, but was not featured on the official soundtrack album.
- "Nothing" accompanied the end credits of the 1995 film Johnny Mnemonic, and it was included on the film's soundtrack along with "Lost".
- "Lost", "Lies", and "Can't Happen Here" were included in the 1995 film Mortal Kombat, but were not included on the official soundtrack.
