= What Do I Have to Do? (Stabbing Westward song) =

Single by Stabbing Westward

from the album Wither Blister Burn & Peel
- Released: 1996
- Recorded: 1995 in New York City
- Length: 4:09 (album version); 3:37 (edit)
- Label: Columbia
- Songwriter(s): Christopher Hall, Walter Flakus, Jim Sellers, Andy Kubiszewski
- Producer(s): John Fryer

Stabbing Westward singles chronology
"Nothing" (1994)	"What Do I Have to Do?" (1996)	"Shame" (1996)

"What Do I Have to Do?" is a song by American industrial rock band Stabbing Westward. The song was released as the first single from the band's 1996 album Wither Blister Burn & Peel. The song is considered the group's breakout single, with its music video entering rotation on MTV.

== Background ==
In a 2020 interview with Songfacts, lead singer Christopher Hall said:

It's a song of frustration. Just the willingness to do anything to try and make somebody love you again after they've fallen out of love with you. And I think I can tell you with great certainty that there's nothing you can do! I think Lyle Lovett said it best in a song: "She's Already Made Up Her Mind"... and there's nothing you can do to change that.

== Music video ==
The song's music video begins with a shot of vocalist Christopher Hall standing in a desert, before falling backwards. The song begins with a woman singing the first verse. When the chorus starts, the video cuts to a shot of the band performing in the desert. At the end of the chorus, a car drives off. During the second verse, the video cuts between shots of the band performing and the car driving. At the video's end, the camera pulls around and reveals that Hall and the woman have both died.

== Track listing ==
No.	Title	Length
1.	"What Do I Have to Do?"	4:07
2.	"Falls Apart" (Powdered Cat Mix)	5:27
3.	"Slipping Away" (Suicide Mix)	7:03
4.	"Nothing"	4:50
Total length:		21:27

== Personnel ==
- Christopher Hall – lead vocals
- Mark Eliopulos – guitar, backing vocals
- Jim Sellers – bass
- Walter Flakus – keyboards, programming
- Andy Kubiszewski – drums, backing vocals

== Reception ==
According to a 1996 The Virginian-Pilot article, "the band produces a sound that borrows sonic textures from industrial bands like KMFDM and Nine Inch Nails. Within that framework, however, Stabbing Westward turns down the intensity and turns up the melodic hooks". After the song's release, the band was generally compared to Nine Inch Nails, but according to Alan Escher of AllMusic, who criticized this as oversimplifying things, it is particularly this song that exhibits the band's Depeche Mode influences, evident from the synth bass.

== Charts ==
Chart (1996)	Peak position
US Hot 100 Airplay (Billboard)	60
US Modern Rock Tracks (Billboard)	11
US Mainstream Rock Tracks (Billboard)	7
