= Serling =

Serling may refer to:

== People ==
- Craig E. Serling (born 1964), American film director, film producer, screenwriter, and television editor
- Robert J. Serling (1918–2010), American novelist and aviation writer
- Rod Serling (1924–1975), American screenwriter, playwright, television producer, and narrator/on-screen host of The Twilight Zone

== Places ==
- Serling, the Hungarian name for Măgurele village, Mărișelu Commune, Bistrița-Năsăud County, Romania
- Serling Lake, an alternative name for Siling Lake, Tibet
