= Shame (Stabbing Westward song) =

Single by Stabbing Westward

from the album Wither Blister Burn & Peel
- Released: 1996
- Recorded: 1995 in New York City
- Genre: Industrial metal; alternative metal
- Length: 4:54 (album version); 4:09 (edit)
- Label: Columbia
- Songwriters: Walter Flakus, Christopher Hall, Andy Kubiszewski, Jim Sellers
- Producer: John Fryer

Stabbing Westward singles chronology
"What Do I Have to Do?" (1996)	"Shame" (1996)	"Sometimes It Hurts" (1998)

"Shame" is a song by American industrial rock band Stabbing Westward. The song was released as the second and final single from the band's 1996 album Wither Blister Burn & Peel.

== Background ==
In a 2020 interview with Songfacts, lead singer Christopher Hall said:

"Shame" was very much me asking the simple question, "How can I keep going?" I had lost someone – a divorce from my first wife - after we had gone on tour forever and ever. It was just, "How can I exist without you? How am I supposed to continue to keep living when all I can think about is you and you not being here?" I tend to come back to that theme quite often.

== Reception ==
In a retrospective overview of the band, Kyle Anderson of MTV said the song "remains a pretty solid anthem." Anderson also praised the video, saying it "is more clever than it has any right to be."

== Music video ==
The video begins with a woman (Julie) running around and dancing in her living room. Her phone rings and the caller is her ex-boyfriend (Nick), who just escaped from a mental institution. Going to Julie's, Nick runs into a cop who he promptly kills. As Julie tries to run away and take the elevator, the officer's body falls on her before she continues running. Nick chases her to the building's roof, where he jumps at her and misses, falling to his death. The video is inter-cut with shots of the band performing the song in a room, leaving one by one before Hall is the only one left. The other members leave to see the movie, which is the Nick and Julie story.

=== Actors ===
- Christopher Hall as himself
- Walter Flakus as himself
- Andy Kubiszewski as himself
- Mark Eliopulos as himself
- Jim Sellers as himself
- Clint Curtis as Nick

== Track listing ==
US single

No.	Title	Length
1.	"Shame" (radio edit)	4:02
2.	"Shame" (LP version)	4:54
Total length:		8:56

Australian single

No.	Title	Length
1.	"Shame" (Radio Edit)	4:02
2.	"Shame" (On You Mix)	6:23
3.	"Shame" (It Up Mix)	6:38
4.	"Shame" (LP Version)	4:54
Total length:		22:57

Austrian single

No.	Title	Length
1.	"Shame" (Album Version)	4:54
2.	"Shame" (On You Mix)	6:25
3.	"Shame" (It Up Mix)	6:40
4.	"Drowning"	3:47

12" single

Side A
No.	Title	Length
1.	"Shame" (On You Mix)	6:22
2.	"Shame" (It Up Mix)	6:39

Side B
No.	Title	Length
1.	"Falls Apart" (Powdered Cat Mix)	5:27
2.	"Slipping Away" (Suicide Mix)	7:03

== Charts ==
Chart	Peak position
US Hot 100 Airplay	69
US Modern Rock Tracks (Billboard)	14
US Mainstream Rock Tracks (Billboard)	7

== Personnel ==
- Christopher Hall – vocals, guitar
- Mark Eliopulos – guitar
- Jim Sellers – bass
- Walter Flakus – keyboards, programming
- Andy Kubiszewski – drums
