= Prick (band) =

American rock band

- Also known as: Riverhead
- Origin: Los Angeles, California, United States
- Genres: Industrial rock, alternative rock
- Years active: 1992–2003
- Labels: Nothing/Interscope, Lucky Pierre Music
- Members: Kevin McMahon
- Past members: Chris Schleyer; Andy Kubiszewski; Sebastien Monney; Sean Furlong; Brian Kehew; Paul Roessler; Garrett Hammond; Tom Lash; Greg Zydyk
- Website: luckypierremusic.com

Prick was an American industrial rock band, founded in 1992 in Los Angeles by guitarist and songwriter Kevin McMahon, after his first project Lucky Pierre disbanded. The first line-up of the band featured McMahon on vocals and guitar, Chris Schleyer on guitar and Andy Kubiszewski on drums. The band was known for its glam rock and new wave influences.

== History ==
From 1989 to 1992, Kevin McMahon lived in Los Angeles and continued to write songs after the dissolution of his previous project, Lucky Pierre. In 1992, started a new unnamed project and recorded four demo songs with Trent Reznor, a longtime friend and a former Lucky Pierre member who found success with his new project, Nine Inch Nails. These songs were recorded in Reznor's Le Pig studio and featured a re-recording of a track from Lucky Pierre's 1988 Communiqué EP. After Reznor was fully immersed in the recording of Nine Inch Nails' second album, The Downward Spiral, McMahon went to England to collaborate with British producer Warne Livesey.

Meanwhile, he was joined up with guitarist Chris Schleyer and drummer Andy Kubiszewski, who was known for his involvement in the bands Exotic Birds and Stabbing Westward and recorded eight songs with them. The band signed to Nothing Records of Interscope, a vanity label founded by Reznor and former Lucky Pierre manager John Malm Jr. The band completed their first record.

In 1994, McMahon assembled a live band for this project. The new line-up featured Kevin McMahon on vocals and guitar, Chris Schleyer on lead guitar, Sebastien Monney on bass, Brian Kehew on keyboards and Sean Furlong on drums. The band performed under the name Riverhead in clubs in Los Angeles, unbeknownst to Nothing/Interscope Records. Kehew eventually left the band after 3 shows and was replaced by Paul Roessler in late 1994. The band subsequently changed its name to Prick and released its debut 7-inch single, "Communiqué", which was followed by the band's self-titled debut album in 1995. The album sold 66,000 copies. The track "Animal" became a minor alternative radio hit and its music video was released at the same year.

Furlong and Roessler were fired from the band in 1995. Garrett Hammond replaced Furlong on drums and Dave Ogilvie was hired for live programming. The band performed as a supporting act to David Bowie, alongside Nine Inch Nails on Outside Tour in 1995. In 1996, McMahon played guitar for three Nine Inch Nails shows on Nights of Nothing tour and was backed by them on two Prick tracks.

In 1996, McMahon moved to London to record a follow-up Prick's debut album. Nevertheless, the label did not support his efforts for the second album, due to creative differences and McMahon's reluctance in producing a more radio-friendly effort. Prick was subsequently unsigned from Nothing Records. In 1999, McMahon was able acquire the publishing rights for his songs from Interscope.

In 2002, he released Prick's second studio album, The Wreckard, independently through Lucky Pierre Music's official website. At the same year, he assembled a new line-up for the Prick, consisting of Greg Zydyk on guitar, former Lucky Pierre member Tom Lash on bass and Andy Kubiszewski on drums. The band briefly performed in 2002 and 2003.

== Band members ==
- Kevin McMahon - vocals, guitar, bass, keyboards, drums (1992-2003)
- Chris Schleyer - guitar (1993-1997)
- Andy Kubiszewski - drums (1993, 2002-2003); live programming (2002-2003)
- Sebastien Monney - bass (1993-1997)
- Sean Furlong - drums (1994-1995)
- Brian Kehew - keyboards (1994)
- Paul Roessler - keyboards (1994-1995)
- Garrett Hammond - drums (1995-2002)
- Tom Lash - bass (2002-2003)
- Greg Zydyk - guitar (2002-2003)

Past live members

- Dave Ogilvie - programming (1995)

== Discography ==
Studio albums

- Prick (1995, Nothing Records)
- The Wreckard (2002, Lucky Pierre Music)

Live albums

- Boston Live (2009, Lucky Pierre Music)

Singles

- "Communiqué"/"Crack" (1994, Nothing Records)
- "Animal" (1995, Nothing/Interscope Records)
