= So Far Away (Stabbing Westward song) =

Single by Stabbing Westward

from the album Stabbing Westward
- Released: 2001
- Length: 4:10 (album version); 3:53 (radio edit)
- Label: Koch
- Songwriter(s): Walter Flakus; Christopher Hall; Andy Kubiszewski; Jim Sellers
- Producer(s): Ed Buller; Stabbing Westward

Stabbing Westward singles chronology
"Haunting Me" (1999)	"So Far Away" (2001)	"Dead and Gone" (2020)

"So Far Away" is a song by American band Stabbing Westward. The song was released as the only single from the band's 2001 eponymous album.

== Track listing ==
US promo single
No.	Title	Length
1.	"So Far Away" (radio edit)	3:53

US enhanced single
No.	Title	Length
1.	"So Far Away"	4:10
2.	"High"	3:24
3.	"So Far Away" (music video)	4:03

Austria single 1
No.	Title	Length
1.	"So Far Away" (radio edit)	3:53
2.	"So Far Away" (album version)	4:10
3.	"Last Time"	3:35

Austria single 2
No.	Title	Length
1.	"So Far Away" (radio edit)	3:53
2.	"Wasted"	4:45

Australian CD single (Shock Records)
No.	Title	Length
1.	"So Far Away" (radio edit)	3:53
2.	"So Far Away" (album version)	4:10
3.	"Wasted" (acoustic)	4:38

== Personnel ==
- Christopher Hall – vocals, guitar
- Derrek Hawkins – guitar
- Jim Sellers – bass
- Walter Flakus – keyboard
- Andy Kubiszewski – drums

== Charts ==
Chart performance for "So Far Away"
Chart (2001)	Peak position
Australia (ARIA)	85
US Modern Rock Tracks (Billboard)	21
US Mainstream Rock Tracks (Billboard)	23
