= Wither Blister Burn & Peel =

Wither Blister Burn + Peel

Studio album by Stabbing Westward
- Released: January 23, 1996
- Recorded: May 1995
- Studio: Bearsville (Woodstock)
- Genres: Industrial rock; alternative rock
- Length: 46:36
- Label: Columbia
- Producer: John Fryer

Stabbing Westward chronology
Ungod (1994)	Wither Blister Burn + Peel (1996)	Darkest Days (1998)

Singles from Wither Blister Burn + Peel
- 1. "What Do I Have to Do?" Released: 1996; 2. "Shame" Released: 1996

Professional ratings
Review scores
Source	Rating
AllMusic	3/5 stars
Sputnikmusic	3.2/5 stars

Wither Blister Burn + Peel is the second album by the American industrial rock band Stabbing Westward, released on Columbia Records. The album was recorded in New York in May 1995, and released in New York City and Los Angeles on January 4, 1996. The album was released throughout the rest of the United States on January 23, 1996. It includes the singles "What Do I Have To Do?" and "Shame". Wither Blister Burn + Peel was certified gold on September 27, 1996.

The album is titled interchangeably as Wither Blister Burn + Peel (with a plus sign) and Wither Blister Burn & Peel (with an ampersand). The cover art shows it with a plus sign, though some sources list it with an ampersand due to database syntaxing and other technical reasons. The ampersand title has caught on, and both syntaxes are accepted now.

"What Do I Have To Do?" was the band's first hit, thanks to heavy MTV exposure, first reaching the Modern Rock Tracks chart, where it would peak at #11, then achieving even greater success on the Mainstream Rock Tracks chart, where it peaked at #7. "Shame" was released soon after, matching "What Do I Have To Do"'s #7 peak on the Mainstream Rock chart, and peaking at #14 on the Modern Rock chart.

== Track listing ==
All tracks are written by Stabbing Westward.

No.	Title	Length
1.	"I Don't Believe"	4:19
2.	"Shame"	4:52
3.	"What Do I Have to Do?"	4:08
4.	"Why"	6:09
5.	"Inside You"	3:44
6.	"Falls Apart"	3:58
7.	"So Wrong"	3:25
8.	"Crushing Me"	4:19
9.	"Sleep"	5:22
10.	"Slipping Away"	6:16
Total length:		46:36

Japanese edition bonus tracks
No.	Title	Length
11.	"Everything I Touch"	4:23
12.	"Dawn"	6:06
Total length:		57:05

== Personnel ==
- Christopher Hall – lead vocals, guitar, drum machine programming
- Jim Sellers – bass, guitar
- Walter Flakus – keyboards, programming, backing vocals
- Andy Kubiszewski – drums, guitar, keyboards

== Appearances ==
- The song "What Do I Have to Do?" was featured in the movie Masterminds in 1997. It was featured in the Smallville episode "Tempest" in 2002.
- The song "Dawn" appeared on the soundtrack for Escape from L.A. Though the Japanese release lists the song as 6:06, this is the standard version of the song at 4:34. The rest of the runtime is silence.
- The song "Everything I Touch" (on the Japanese release) appears on the regular release of Darkest Days, though this is a re-recording. The runtimes differ in that the later recording is 1 minute shorter than this recording.
