= Timothy Adams Jr. =

American academic (born 1961)

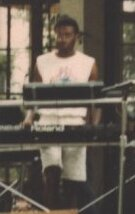
- Adams in 1984
- Born: 1961 (age 64–65); Covington, Georgia, U.S.
- Spouse: Kimberly Toscano Adams
- Children: 1

Academic background
- Education: BA, MA, Cleveland Institute of Music

Academic work
- Institutions: University of Georgia; Carnegie Mellon University; Butler University

Timothy K. Adams Jr. (born 1961), formerly known as Tim Adams, is the Mildred Goodrum Heyward Professor at the University of Georgia's Hugh Hodgson School of Music. Prior to joining the faculty, he was the Principal Timpani with the Canton Symphony Orchestra, Florida Philharmonic Orchestra, Indianapolis Symphony Orchestra, and Pittsburgh Symphony Orchestra.

== Early life and education ==
Adams was born in Covington, Georgia in 1961. His father was a band director for middle schools and high schools in Georgia. At the age of 13, as the youngest member of the Atlanta Symphony Youth Orchestra, Adams chose to pursue a career in music. From the 4th grade through the 12th, he studied with Bill Wilder, the assistant timpani and percussion in the Atlanta Symphony Orchestra. As a senior in high school, Adams started playing as an extra in the Atlanta Symphony and continued playing with them through college.

Adams received both his Bachelor's and master's degrees at the Cleveland Institute of Music and spent two summers as a fellow of the Tanglewood Music Center. While completing his undergraduate degree, Adams won the Principal Timpani Position with the Canton Symphony Orchestra. In the mid-1980s, Adams participated in a band called the Exotic Birds. As an alumnus of the Cleveland Institute of Music, Adams was honored with their 2020 Outstanding Alumni Award during their Commencement Weekend.

== Career ==
Adams held the position of Principal Timpani with the Canton Symphony Orchestra for five years before being hired by the Florida Philharmonic Orchestra. He played with the orchestra for four years before replacing Thomas N. Akins as the Principal Timpanist of the Indianapolis Symphony Orchestra. While in Indianapolis, he also held the position of Principal Percussionist of the Eastern Music Festival and held a faculty position at Butler University. Adams was also the sole black member of the orchestra during his years with them.

Adams eventually left Indianapolis in 1995 to become the Principal Timpanist of the Pittsburgh Symphony Orchestra (PSO). In his capacity as Principal Timpanist, Adams appeared on Mister Rogers' Neighborhood in 1999 to promote classical music. He was also active in the Pittsburgh community, participating in Education and Outreach activities as both a coach and mentor to aspiring percussionists.

Adams left PSO in 2010 to pursue other interests and joined the faculty at the University of Georgia as their Chair of the Percussion Department in 2010. In March 2021, Adams was given the Mildred Goodrum Heyward Distinguished Professor title at the University of Georgia's Hugh Hodgson School of Music in honor of his "significant impact on the university in addition to fulfilling his regular academic responsibilities."
