= Stabbing Westward (album) =

Studio album by Stabbing Westward
- Released: May 22, 2001
- Genre: Alternative rock
- Length: 44:40
- Label: Koch
- Producers: Ed Buller, Stabbing Westward

Stabbing Westward chronology
Darkest Days (1998)	Stabbing Westward (2001)	The Essential Stabbing Westward (2003)

Singles from Stabbing Westward
- 1. "So Far Away" Released: 2001

Professional ratings
Review scores
Source	Rating
AllMusic	3.5/5 stars
Kerrang!	3/5 stars
Sputnikmusic	3.4/5

Stabbing Westward is the fourth studio album by the American industrial rock band Stabbing Westward. It is their first album to be produced by Ed Buller and released on Koch Records. The album was released on May 22, 2001. The album shows a change in direction for the band. The album's songs are much less heavy and aggressive, while the industrial focus has given way to a more melodic sound. Before the album was released, lead singer Christopher Hall said in an interview that Stabbing Westward wrote great pop-rock songs, but the band had always ended up making them ugly by adding effects and screaming, etc. On this album, he claimed, they decided to write what they wanted, regardless of fan expectation. "The Only Thing" is a love song for Christopher Hall's wife.

During concert performances since 2023, the band has been adding performances of songs from this album as they had originally intended them to be recorded, such as Wasted and The Only Thing which also features updated lyrics to reference TikTok. Walter Flakus mentioned during an interview that he noticed an increase in feedback from fans showing interest in a possible re-recording of the album, though no official plans have been stated as of yet.

The album did well in Australia, but ultimately failed to sell worldwide.

== Track listing ==
All tracks are written by Stabbing Westward.

Stabbing Westward track listing
No.	Title	Length
1.	"So Far Away"	4:10
2.	"Perfect"	3:46
3.	"I Remember"	5:43
4.	"Wasted"	4:45
5.	"Happy"	4:03
6.	"The Only Thing"	5:38
7.	"Angel"	4:22
8.	"Breathe You In"	4:00
9.	"High"	3:21
10.	"Television"	4:52
Total length:		44:40

Japanese/Australian edition bonus track
No.	Title	Length
11.	"Last Time"	3:35
Total length:		48:15

Best Buy bonus disc
No.	Title	Length
1.	"So Far Away" (acoustic)	3:48
2.	"Wasted" (acoustic)	4:37
Total length:		53:05

There is a US release that was a Best Buy exclusive. This package contains a bonus disk featuring previously unreleased acoustic versions of "So Far Away" and "Wasted". On the second disk, there is a misprint: it says "Perfect" instead of "Wasted". This two-disc set was only available at Best Buy stores in 2001 and only during the first week of its release.

== Personnel ==
Stabbing Westward

- Christopher Hall – vocals
- Derrek Hawkins – guitar, acoustic guitar
- Jim Sellers – bass, baritone guitar
- Walter Flakus – keyboards, synthesizer, programming
- Andy Kubiszewski – drums, vibraphone, marimba, synthesizer, acoustic guitar

Additional

- Ed Buller – production, engineer
- Kent Matcke – editing, engineer
- Enrique Gonzales – editing, assistant engineer
- Howie Weinberg – mastering
- Tom Lord-Alge – mixing
- Matthew Welch – photography
- Paul McMenamin – art direction, design, artwork (CD package)
- Scott Rivera – artwork (design assistance)

== Charts ==
Chart performance for Stabbing Westward
Chart (2001)	Peak position
Australian Albums (ARIA)	97
New Zealand Albums (RMNZ)	40
US Billboard 200	47
US Independent Albums (Billboard)	2
