= Jam (film) =

Jam (aka: Jam: When Lives Collide)
- DVD cover
- Directed by: Craig E. Serling
- Written by: Craig E. Serling; Nicole Lonner
- Based on: Jam (2004 short film) by Craig E. Seriling; Nicole Lonner
- Produced by: Dianne Burnett; Rebecca Landau; Nicole Lonner; Elizabeth Serling; Ryan Westheimer; Christopher Wilmot
- Starring: Elizabeth Bogush; Dan Byrd; Julie Claire; David DeLuise
- Cinematography: Jeff Venditti
- Edited by: Tirsa Hackshaw; Spencer Keimon; Craig E. Serling
- Music by: Andy Kubiszewski
- Production companies: Burnett Entertainment; Thanksgiving Films
- Distributed by: Starz!/Anchor Bay Entertainment
- Release dates: April 1, 2006 (Vail Film Festival); July 3, 2007 (United States)
- Running time: 91 minutes
- Country: United States
- Language: English

Jam (or Jam: When Lives Collide) is a 2006 drama film directed by Craig E. Serling. Written by Serling and Nicole Lonner, the film was executive produced by Dianne Burnett for Burnett Entertainment in association with Thanksgiving Films. As Serling's first feature-length project, Jam is based upon a short film by the same name that Serling shot in 2004. Starring Elizabeth Bogush, Dan Byrd, Julie Claire, and David DeLuise, Jam premiered at the Vail Film Festival on April 1, 2006, aired on television on the Starz! TV channel, and was released on DVD on July 3, 2007, by the Starz! distribution branch of Anchor Bay Entertainment.

== Background ==
=== Short film ===
The original concept was based upon an incident when Serling and his writing partner Nicole Lonner were stuck in a traffic in upstate New York. The script for Jam was completed in 2003, and after obtaining financing, Serling shot the concept as a short film in 2004, completing principal photography in 2 1/2 days, and making the short film's debut at The Other Venice Film Festival in 2005.

=== Feature film ===
The filmmaker found that shooting it as a short before shooting it as a feature allowed him to hone the script and concept to better create a marketable project. After obtaining financing for the feature-length version, Serling shot it over a 15-day period in 2006. The feature-length film made festival rounds before being licensed for release through Starz!, airing first on their TV channel and then being released on DVD through Anchor Bay Entertainment.

== Plot ==
On Father's Day, Ted (William Forsythe) and Josh (Dan Byrd) are out for an afternoon drive in the country. When a dog darts across the road, Ted slams on the brakes and is struck from behind by Lorraine (Marianne Jean-Baptiste), a cellist on her way to a performance gig. The impact shoves Ted's vehicle into a power pole, which falls across the road and drops electrically charged lines, blocking traffic on the narrow two-lane rural highway. As they and other travelers are now stuck, strangers emerge from their cars and become unusual companions while awaiting the hazard to be cleared.

Dale (Jeffrey Dean Morgan), is a divorcé spending his Father's Day with his children, Robert (Skyler Gisondo) and Brianna (Marissa Blanchard). Amy (Amanda Detmer) is en route to her own wedding with her friends Stephanie (Amanda Foreman) and Jen (Elizabeth Bogush) along for support. Lilac (Gina Torres) is a lesbian hippie who moves among the other stranded motorists seeking help for her very pregnant partner Rose (Mariah O'Brien). She is hassled by Gary (Jonathan Silverman) and Judy (Julie Claire), a yuppie couple who have been bickering over the fact that they have been unable to conceive a child. In a stolen RV rednecks Curt (Christopher Amitrano) and Jerry (David DeLuise) have stolen an ATM and cannot figure out how to get the money from inside it. As they contemplate their problem, Lilac enlists their aid to deliver Rose's baby. Mick (Alex Rocco) and his wife Ruby (Tess Harper) are a middle-age couple out for an afternoon drive, and Mick ends up as a fatherly advisor on "affairs of the heart" to a few of the others stranded.

== Cast ==
- Marianne Jean-Baptiste as Lorraine
- William Forsythe as Ted
- Jonathan Silverman as Gary
- Elizabeth Bogush as Jen
- Dan Byrd as Josh
- Julie Claire as Judy
- David DeLuise as Jerry
- Amanda Detmer as Amy
- Amanda Foreman as Stephanie
- Tess Harper as Ruby
- Jeffrey Dean Morgan as Dale
- Mariah O'Brien as Rose
- Alex Rocco as Mick
- Gina Torres as Lilac
- Skyler Gisondo as Robert
- Christopher Amitrano as Curt
- Marissa N. Blanchard as Brianna

== Releases ==
=== Film festivals ===
The film screened at the Directors Guild of America before its multiple film festivals in 2006 and before its 2007 release on DVD. These festivals included the Vail Film Festival, the Newport Beach International Film Festival, The Other Venice Film Festival, the Boston Film Festival, the Hollywood Film Festival, and the Santa Fe Film Festival.

=== DVD ===
After airing on the Starz! TV channel, the film was released on DVD on July 3, 2007, by Starz!/Anchor Bay Entertainment.

DVD extras include commentary with writer/director Craig Serling, cinematographer Jeff Vinditti, and composer Andy Kubiszewski, with the three peppering each other with questions. There is also the "making of" vignette When Lives Collide showing behind-the-scenes of the production and interviews with the writers, as well as two short "deleted scenes" clips, the film's original trailer, and Starz/Anchor Bay previews. Also included is the film's screenplay in a downloadable PDF format.

On March 4, 2008, the film had its television premiere on the Showtime network.

== Recognition ==
=== Awards and nominations ===
In 2006, the film won the Santa Fe Film Festival's 'Independent Spirit Award' for writers Craig E. Serling and Nicole Lonner.

=== Critical response ===
The AMC Filmcritic appreciated the director's efforts, in that the plot device of a group of people simply stopped in traffic and interacting for 90 minutes while awaiting the road to be cleared was "either genius or insane." They expanded that the interwoven storylines contained "some good stories and some bad, some good actors and some poor ones." And concluded that "The concept is cute but ultimately a little undercooked."

The E.Filmcritic reviewer felt that as the auto accident that resulted the topic's traffic jam is between black woman and a white father and son pair, his initial impression was that the film would be about interpersonal race conflict. He was pleased that with the film's action set on Father's Day, it becomes more about the parent-child relationships of the various persons stuck in the traffic jam. He appreciated the film's has "a theme that holds the film together without being painfully obvious about it", and noted whatever "shortcomings the film has likely come about due to the tight shooting schedule".

DVD Talk was less forgiving, writing "Jam is a great big pile-up of a movie", and offered that being "more than just contrived or hokey, the film stuffs itself full of sitcom characters and the sort of situations that would get rejected from bottom rung TV dramas." They felt that the material was "dopey" and "hackneyed", that the number of interwoven character studies did not offer any single story thread worth watching, and that none of the characters rang true in their behaviors, attitudes, or revelations. They offered that while most of the cast struggled, actors Gina Torres, Marianne Jean-Baptiste, and William Forsythe manage to maintain artistic integrity, even though all were hampered by trite dialogue, weak plotting, cheap symbolism, lazy exposition, and laughable story turns. The conclusion was that the film "plays like a clumsily written and poorly performed stage play, the kind that really wants to say important things about the human condition but can't get beyond its own lousiness."

DVD Verdict was also less forgiving, offering that it was the "Seinfeld of indie films" in that "It's a movie about nothing." They note that no one is hurt in the collision that creates the storyline, the ATM and RV thieves are "innocuous to the point of being silly", that the film's one attempt at a sexual overtones and liaison goes nowhere, and the "big reveals" aren't just not big, they are pretty much set up and no surprise to the viewer. They also note that being set on Father's Day, there is "a vague thread of "father issues" throughout the piece", but that being vague, the threads are not properly developed. They also noted that though billed as a drama, the film was "more comedy than drama," but that it did not have enough comedy to make it a funny film. In their critique, they wrote that the title of "Jam does the movie a disservice," and that a more appropriate title might have been Stuck or Bored, for the film offered "none of the intensity that people feel in a real traffic jam—believe me, I live in Los Angeles, I know traffic jams." The reviewer "never felt the drama, the tension or the confronting of fears" as was offered through descriptions on the back cover of the DVD box. They offered in the film's defense that as a character study, it succeeded "to a certain extent," and that the actors proved better than the material with which they were dealing, all cast being recognizable television staples for years. In conclusion, the reviewer wrote "Watching Jam, is like watching a dozen real people do what real people do when they're stuck—which is nothing much. So if it was the filmmaker's desire to capture a very real moment in the lives of very normal people, he succeeded with flying colors."
