= Kevin McMahon (musician) =

- Born: September 21, 1953 (age 72); Baltimore, Maryland, U.S.
- Genres: Industrial rock, alternative rock, new wave, noise rock
- Occupations: Singer-songwriter, musician
- Instruments: Vocals, guitar, bass, keyboards, drums
- Years active: 1974–present
- Labels: Nothing/Interscope, Lucky Pierre Music, Banana, Unadulterated

Kevin McMahon (born September 21, 1953) is a musician, singer, and songwriter for the long-standing bands Lucky Pierre and Prick.

McMahon began recording with his new wave group Lucky Pierre in 1974, releasing a number of vinyl singles through 1981. Lucky Pierre initially consisted of John Guciardo on guitar, Brian Dempsey on drums, Dennis DeVito on bass and McMahon on lead vocals and guitar. In 1976, Tom Lash joined the band on bass guitar, and DeVito moved to guitar. Tom Miller played keyboards at this time. In 1977, Dempsey left the band and was replaced by drummer Gary Shay, and then drummer Dave Zima. After many live shows, both Tom Miller and John Gusciardo left Cleveland for California and DeVito switched to lead guitar. Many showcase concerts, radio broadcasts, and a few 45 rpm singles followed. Lucky Pierre continued as a four-piece outfit, sometimes augmented by horns and vocalists to perform the array of song styles McMahon was developing. McMahon then went on hiatus until 1988, when Lucky Pierre recorded the Communiqué EP with Guciardo, Lash, Zima. Lucky Pierre disbanded again after the recording of Communiqué, but McMahon remained in contact with the band's manager, John Malm Jr.

During the early 1990s, McMahon began his second musical project, the industrial rock band Prick. Prick was eventually signed to Reznor's Nothing Records label. The band's debut self-titled album was released in 1995. Prick's lead single, "Animal," received high rotation on MuchMusic and MTV, and Prick opened for Nine Inch Nails' and David Bowie's Outside tour World Tour. McMahon would also be a temporary member of Nine Inch Nails, playing guitar on a short tour in 1995. The band would also perform 2 Prick songs on these nights, with McMahon sharing vocals with Reznor.

Prick re-emerged in 2002 with The Wreckard, independently released by McMahon and featuring many songs once slated for the second, canceled Nothing Records album. Two years later, McMahon released Lucky Pierre's first full album, ThinKing, again selling the album independently online.

In October 2008, McMahon released the hard-rock track "Runaway Brain," this time under the moniker ( sic ). The song was available from a fansite for a limited time, with a note in the MP3's metadata noting, "prick or treat – derailing things to come from luckypierremusic – THIS NOVEMBER (or ...it all depends on the speed of green)."

On June 21, 2009, luckypierremusic.com went live, offering digital downloads, new and vintage shirts and hats, and new CDs. As alluded to previously, The Wreckard and ThinKing are being reissued, and the Fear of Blue and (sic) album and EP are also being released. All of the music can be obtained through a six-CD package which features a Prick Live CD only available as part of the package.

== Discography ==
=== Albums ===
- Prick – Prick (1995)
- Prick – The Wreckard (2002)
- Lucky Pierre – ThinKing (2004)
- Lucky Pierre – Lucky Pierre (2009) (compilation)
- Fear of Blue – Fear of Blue (2009) (recorded in 1990)
- Lucky Pierre – ThinKing (2009) (Re-release)
- Prick – The Wreckard (2009) (Re-release)
- Prick – Prick Boston LIVE (2009) (live album)

=== Singles and EPs ===
- Lucky Pierre – "Fans & Cameras" / "Idlewood" (7" single, 1977, 1979)
- Lucky Pierre – "Into My Arms" / "Match" (7in single, 1980)
- Lucky Pierre – "Stetson's" / "Once A Child" (7in single, 1981)
- Lucky Pierre – "Communiqué" (one-sided 7in single, 1984)
- Lucky Pierre – "Cool Summer Night" / "Chilly Willy" (7-inch single, 1984)
- Lucky Pierre – "Muchacha Latina Today" / "Birdman" (7-inch single, 1984)
- Lucky Pierre – Communiqué (12-inch EP, 1988) side 1 = "Communiqué" and "Tough" side 2 = "Analyst Says," "I Need to Get to Know" and "Man Against the Wall"
- Prick – "Animal" (promotional CD single, 1995)
- Prick – "Communiqué" / "Crack" (promotional 7-inch single, 1994)
- (sic) – (sic) (CD EP, 2009)
