= Craig E. Serling =

American film director

- Born: August 7, 1964 (age 61); Syracuse, New York, United States
- Education: Bachelor of Arts in Film and Photographic Art
- Alma mater: Rochester Institute of Technology; American Film Institute
- Occupations: Film director; Film producer; Screenwriter; Television editor
- Years active: 1988 to present
- Known for: Multiple Primetime Emmy nominations
- Notable work: Jam (2006)

Craig E. Serling (born 1964) is an American film director, film producer, screenwriter, and television editor known for multiple Primetime Emmy nominations for 'Outstanding Picture Editing for Non-Fiction Programming' and for his 2006 directorial debut feature film Jam.

== Background ==
Serling is a native of Syracuse, New York and was raised in Rochester, New York. He earned a Bachelor of Arts in Film and Photographic Arts at the Rochester Institute of Technology, and moved to New York City to begin working in broadcast news and advertising. In 1989 he was accepted to the American Film Institute’s Center for Advanced Film and Television Studies and moved to Los Angeles. He currently resides in Santa Monica.

== Career ==
In 1994, Serling and his partner, Roland Seeman, developed and shot a half-hour series pilot in Yugoslavia. The purpose of the shoot was to shoot a pilot episode for a show concept profiling the lives and actions of Americans working for aid organizations around the world, and their prime goal was to profile American Red Cross volunteer Diane Paul based out of Zagreb, Croatia. During the shoot they met and included footage of Toby Wolf of the International Organization for Migration and Sonya Thompson, a representative of the US military whose job was to coordinate daily medevac.

In 1995, after a year in post production, the project was completed and titled "American Heroes". Described as "nothing fancy, but a worthy, professional one with good production values and moving, inspirational human interest tales free of schmaltz", both the Simon Wiesenthal Center and the Museum of Tolerance offered to host West Coast premieres. However, in making the rounds to networks, production companies and distributors with their pilot, they received cool receptions. One development executive wrote a rejection letter stating "We do not feel the marketplace can support a show about heroes at the current time", and others in 1995 responded, "We want sex and action", and "We are looking for the next People's Court, and "It sounds boring," and "Hero shows just don't work". The rejection of a worthy concept caused Serling a bit of consternation, and he grudgingly quipped "Perhaps next time I'll produce a show called "Fallen American Heroes". In 1998, Los Angeles Times columnist and critic Howard Rosenberg shared that the pilot had aired on KCET and in praise of it wrote it was "a terrific concept for a weekly series" which "remains just a gleam in Serling's eye and an enriching series waiting to happen".

The concept for Serling's Jam films was inspired by a 2002 incident where he and his writing partner Nicole Lonner were stuck in a traffic jam in upstate New York. The script for was completed in 2003 and, after obtaining financing, Serling shot the concept with principal photography completed in 2-1/2 days. The short film screened at the Method Fest Independent Film Festival in 2004, and debuted at The Other Venice Film Festival in 2005.

Serling found that shooting the concept as a short before expanding into a feature allowed him to hone the script and concept to better create a marketable project. After obtaining financing for the feature-length version, Serling shot it over a 15-day period in 2006. The feature-length film made festival rounds before being licensed for release through Starz!, airing first on their TV channel and then being released on DVD through Anchor Bay Entertainment.

=== Filmography ===
==== Editor ====
- Received Damaged a Black Flag band documentary) (1988)
- American Heroes (1995)
- The Making of 'Super Mario Brothers' (1997)
- Modern Marvels (2 episodes, 1999-2000)
- Survivor - Season Two: The Greatest and Most Outrageous Moments (2001)
- Combat Missions (2002)
- Survivor (58 episodes, 2000-2002)
- American Idol (62 episodes, 2002-2003)
- The Amazing Race (24 episodes, 2002-2003)
- Mad Mad House (2004)
- Jam (2004) (short film)
- NASCAR Drivers: 360
- Jam (2006)
- I Can Make You Thin with Paul McKenna (2008)
- Hardcore Pawn (5 episodes, 2010-2011)
- Kitchen Nightmares (27 episodes, 2010-2011)
- Expedition Impossible (1 episode, 2011)
- Police Women: Most Amazing Arrests (2011)
- Undercover Stings (4 episodes, 2012)
- Shark Week (1 episode, 2013)
- Celebrity Wife Swap (1 episode, 2014)
- The Unlikely's (2016)

==== Producer ====
- Received Damaged (1988)
- Our Favorite Movies (1993)
- American Heroes (1995)
- The Making of 'Super Mario Brothers' (1997)
- Jam (2004) (short film)
- Jam (2006)
- Mall Cops: Mall of America (12 episodes, 2009-2010)
- Gator Boys (6 episodes, 2012)

==== Director / screenwriter ====
- Jam (2004) (short film)
- Jam (2006)

== Recognition ==
=== Awards and nominations ===
- 1994, nominated for CableACE Award for 'Short-Form Programming Series' as producer of television series Our Favorite Movies
- 2001, nominated for Primetime Emmy for 'Outstanding Picture Editing for Non-Fiction Programming' for Survivor
- 2002, nominated for Primetime Emmy for 'Outstanding Picture Editing for Non-Fiction Programming' for Survivor
- 2004, nominated for Primetime Emmy for 'Outstanding Picture Editing for Non-Fiction Programming' for The Amazing Race
- 2006, won Independent Spirit Award as writer/director of Jam at Santa Fe Film Festival
