= Canton Symphony Orchestra =

American orchestra in Canton, Ohio

The Canton Symphony Orchestra
- Orchestra
- Founded: 1937
- Location: Canton, Ohio
- Concert hall: Zimmermann Symphony Center
- Principal conductor: Vacant
- Website: www.cantonsymphony.org

The Canton Symphony Orchestra is an American orchestra based in Canton, Ohio. Founded in 1937, the orchestra made its first performance on February 16, 1938, under the direction of Richard Oppenheim. Louis Lane became its second music director in 1949. Gerhardt Zimmermann directed the orchestra from 1980 until his death in 2023.

On June 2, 1974, the Canton Symphony Orchestra became a “metropolitan orchestra.”

== History ==
The Canton Symphony Orchestra was founded in 1937 in Canton, Ohio and became incorporated one year later in 1938. The symphony's first conductor, Richard Oppenheim, was invited to form the orchestra and held auditions to select the orchestra's first musicians. Each musician was paid for their services at the beginning, which was uncommon for community orchestras at the time.

On February 16, 1938, the Canton Symphony Orchestra held its first concert at the City Auditorium for over 3,300 people. The program featured Beethoven's Egmont Overture, Haydn's Symphony No. 94 in G major “Surprise,” Rimsky-Korsakov's Scheherazade, and Tchaikovsky's Marche Slave. Exactly 75 years later, the Canton Symphony Orchestra performed this same program in celebration of its 75th year anniversary.

On June 2, 1974, the Canton Symphony Orchestra achieved metropolitan status as it was no longer considered a community orchestra. The conductor of the time, Michael Charry, accomplished this by increasing their annual performances from seven to twenty-one, some of which were children's concerts. Charry also increased the annual budget and involved fourth and fifth grade students in their programming.

In July 13, 2014, the Zimmermann Symphony Center opened, with the Canton Symphony Orchestra residing there. Before its construction, the administrative staff worked in a windowless office at the Canton Cultural Center for the Arts while the musicians prepared for concerts in the McKinley High School.

== Music directors ==
- Richard Oppenheim (1937–1949)
- Louis Lane (1949–1961)
- Michael Charry (1961–1974)
- Robert Marcellus (1971–1976)
- Thomas Michalak (1976–1980)
- Gerhardt Zimmermann (1980–2023)
