= The Dreaming (American band) =

American rock band

- Origin: Los Angeles, California, U.S.
- Genres: Industrial rock, hard rock
- Years active: 2001–2018
- Labels: BCD Music Group – USA; Louder Records – Japan
- Members: Christopher Hall; Johnny Haro; Carlton Bost; Franccesca De Struct; Walter Flakus
- Past members: Diego Russo; Jonathan Dyke; Jinxx; Eric Griffin; Nick Quijano; Martin Kelly; Rich Jazmin; Brent Ashley; Ryan Seelbach
- Website: The Dreaming on Facebook

The Dreaming was an American rock band founded in the Hollywood area by Christopher Hall, the lead singer of the band Stabbing Westward, and Johnny Haro in 2001.

== Biography ==
The Dreaming formed in mid 2001 prior the dissolution of Christopher Hall's band Stabbing Westward on February 9, 2002. Chris and Johnny Haro, who had briefly filled in on drums in Stabbing Westward in 1998, took to the studio to record demos for his new project. Enlisting the help of Bryan Carlstrom, who engineered Darkest Days, the group began recording.

The Dreaming completed their first round of demo songs by February 2003 and made their live debut at The Gig in Hollywood, California. The band's first extended play, The Dreaming, was released in 2003. Throughout the following months, The Dreaming played several shows in notable Hollywood venues such as The Gig, Whisky a Go Go, and Dragonfly, and signed a deal with Andy Gould Management.

Throughout 2004, the group continued to play shows on the west coast, including gigs in California, Nevada, and Washington. The band shot a music video for the song "Beautiful" in July 2004. In late 2004, the group re-recorded the track "Beautiful" from The Dreaming EP with famed producer Jay Baumgardner for the soundtrack to the 2005 film Elektra.

Original guitarist Diego Russo would be replaced by former Amen guitarist Jinxx. The Bonus Tracks EP was released in Winter of 2005. 2006 followed with Dreamo, an EP that featured Hall and Jinxx re-interpreting four of the group's songs with both acoustic guitar and violin.

In Fall of 2006, the group went on their first national tour, The Congress of Corruption. The Dreaming opened for Godhead, Ill Niño, and Ra on this tour. Carlton Bost joined the line-up in 2007 after his previous band Deadsy went on hiatus. The band's fourth EP Club Re-Mixes was released in 2007. The Dreaming's debut album Etched In Blood was released on June 24, 2008, through a deal with the Hot Topic retail chain, and it also became available for internet purchase through Apple iTunes.

In promotion of the album, the band embarked on a three-month headlining tour in early 2008 that took them across the United States. They would then follow up with a co-headlining tour with Flaw in late 2008, and a co-headlining tour with Trust Company in early 2009. Jinxx would leave the group in mid-2009 and later join Black Veil Brides. He was replaced by former American Headcharge-guitarist Nick Quijano in 2011. Bassist Martin Kelly from Living Dead Lights and guitarist Rich Jazmin were added to the roster in Fall of 2011. The second album Puppet was released on November 1, 2011, on EAR/EMI records with the first single "Every Trace" scoring early radio adds weeks before the actual radio add date.

Since the beginning of 2013, The Dreaming began working on their third album entitled Rise Again. In late 2014, The Dreaming announced the release date for the new album via their Facebook page as February 10, 2015. It was distributed by Metropolis Records. The first single track from the album entitled "Alone" was released via the internet in November 2014. The song can be downloaded via Metropolis Records website, iTunes and Spotify. The second single track of the album entitled "Still Believe" was first played on February 8, 2015, on KROQ-FM.

Walter Flakus, a backing vocalist and keyboard player for Stabbing Westward, joined The Dreaming on a permanent basis in 2014. The Dreaming was scheduled to tour the west coast along with Die So Fluid between March 4, 2015, and March 14, 2015. According to the band's Facebook page, The Dreaming would continue to tour during a four-week nationwide stint throughout the month of June in 2015. A remix album, From the Ashes, was released on June 23, 2017.

In early 2018, The Dreaming announced that they were working to finish a new album for 2018. However, a public post on Johnny Haro's Facebook page dated August 17, 2018, stated that The Dreaming is done. In an interview in October 2018 Hall indicated that, after a Stabbing Westward reunion tour, the current idea of making a new record featuring guitarist Mark Eliopulos would essentially be turning The Dreaming into Stabbing Westward, which may thus turn out to be the way forward. Although there was never any official statement on the end of The Dreaming, the fourth studio album never materialized, and the principal members of the band went on to tour and release new material as Stabbing Westward, effectively ending The Dreaming.

== Discography ==
The Dreaming discography
- Studio albums: 3
- Extended plays: 4
- Singles: 4
- Music videos: 3
- Remix albums: 1

=== Studio albums ===
Year	Title	Chart positions		
Year	Title	US	US Heat.	US Ind.
2008	Etched In Blood: Released: June 24, 2008; Format: CD, Digital Download	-	-	-
2011	Puppet: Released: November 1, 2011; Label: Epochal, FOF; Format: CD, Digital Download	-	32	-
2015	Rise Again: Released: February 10, 2015; Label: Metropolis Records; Format: CD, 12" Vinyl, Digital Download	-	21	-

=== Remix albums ===
Year	Title
2017	From the Ashes: Released: June 23, 2017; Label: Metropolis Records; Format: CD, Digital Download

=== Extended plays ===
List of extended plays
Title	EP details
The Dreaming	Released: 2003; Label: Self-released; Formats: CD
Bonus Tracks	Released: 2005; Label: Self-released; Formats: Digital Download
Dreamo	Released: 2006; Label: Self-released; Formats: Digital Download
Club Re-Mixes	Released: 2007; Label: Self-released; Formats: Digital Download

=== Singles ===
List of singles, with selected chart positions, showing year released and album name
Title	Year	Peak chart positions		Album
Title	Year	US Act. Rock	US Main. Rock	Album
"Beautiful"	2004	—	—	The Dreaming (EP)
"Every Trace"	2011	35	38	Puppet
"Alone"	2014	—	—	Rise Again
"Still Believe"	2015	—	—	Rise Again
"—" denotes a recording that did not chart or was not released in that territory.

=== Music videos ===
List of music videos
Year	Title
2004	"Beautiful"
2011	"Every Trace"
2014	"Alone"

== Band members ==
=== Final lineup ===
- Christopher Hall – lead vocals (2001–2018)
- Johnny Haro – drums (2001–2018)
- Carlton Bost – guitar, keyboards (2007–2011, 2013–2018)
- Franccesca De Struct – bass (2014–2018)
- Walter Flakus – keys and programming (2014–2018)

=== Former members ===
- Diego Russo – guitar (2003–2005)
- Jonathon Dyke – bass (2003–2005)
- Jinxx – guitar (2005–2009)
- Eric Griffin – guitar (2011–2012)
- Nick Quijano – guitar (2011–2012)
- Martin Kelly – bass (2011–2013)
- Rich Jazmin – guitar (2009–2010, 2011–2013)
- Brent Ashley – bass (2005–2011, 2013–2014)
