= Stabbing Westward =

American industrial rock band

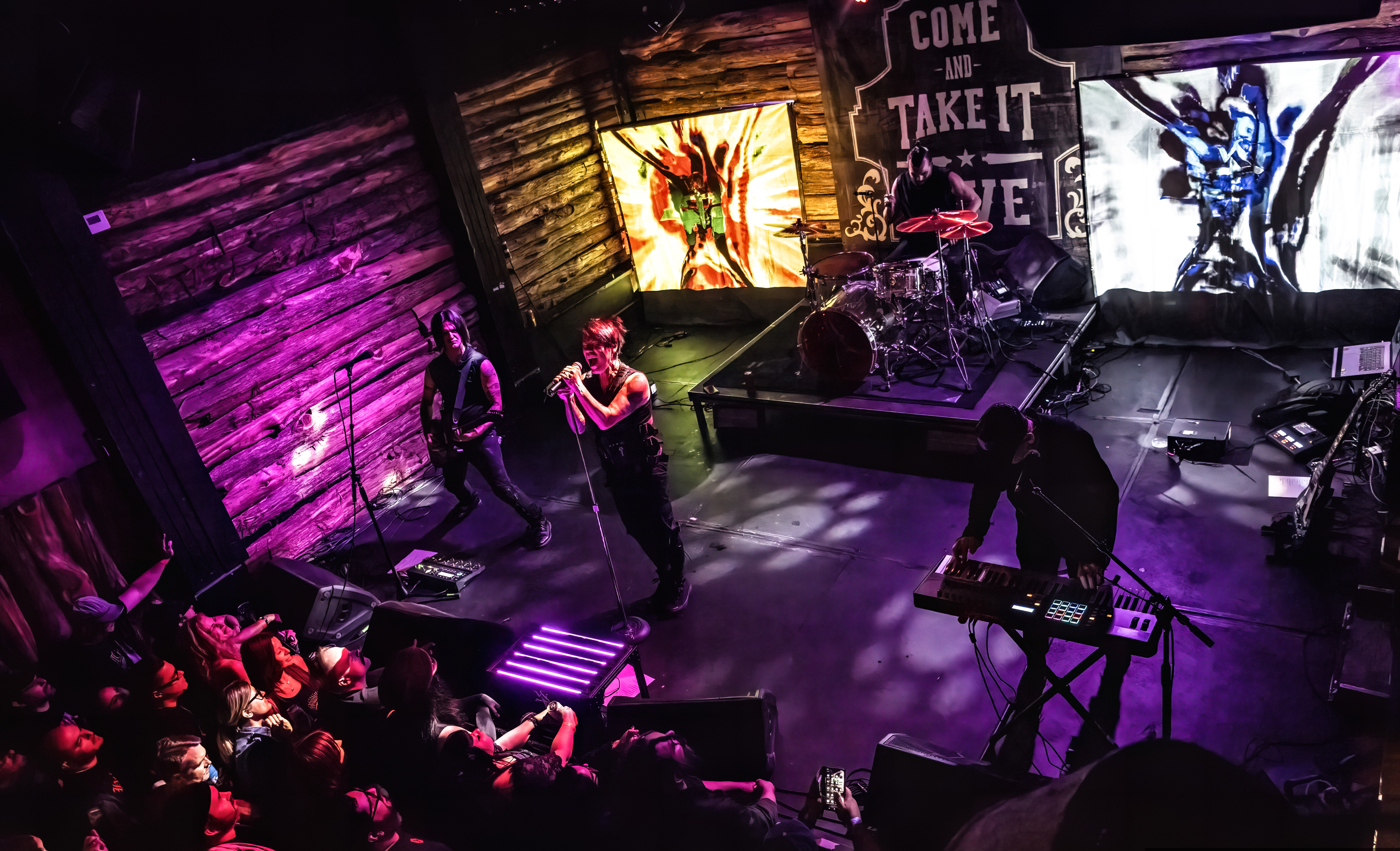
- Stabbing Westward performing in 2024

Background information
- Origin: Macomb, Illinois, U.S.
- Genres: Industrial rock; alternative rock; Industrial metal; alternative metal; nu metal
- Years active: 1985–2002; 2016–present
- Labels: Columbia; Koch; Sony; COP
- Members: Christopher Hall; Walter Flakus; Bobby Amaro; Carlton Bost
- Past members: Jim Clanin; Andrew Hunter; Angelo Negrette; David Suycott; Stuart Zechman; Chris Vrenna; Geoff Dugmore; Mark Eliopulos; Jim Sellers; Andy Kubiszewski; Derrek Hawkins; Johnny Haro; Cyamak Ashtiani
- Website: www.stabbingwestward1.com

Stabbing Westward is an American industrial rock band. Christopher Hall and Walter Flakus formed the band in 1985 in Macomb, Illinois. The band released an extended play in 1992, followed by four studio albums: Ungod (1994), Wither Blister Burn & Peel (1996), Darkest Days (1998), and Stabbing Westward (2001). The band announced a dissolution in February 2002. Stabbing Westward reunited in 2016 to celebrate the 30th anniversary of its formation and continued to perform live shows. The band's first new album in 21 years, Chasing Ghosts, was released in 2022.

== History ==
=== Early years (1985–1992) ===
Christopher Hall and Walter Flakus formed the band Stabbing Westward when they were in college. They came up with the name while working at the college radio station WIUS-FM. It was allegedly from a 1950s speech regarding political fears of Communism "stabbing westward". During an interview in 1996, Hall stated, "Since we went to Western Illinois University, [the name] Stabbing Westward had a certain 'kill everybody in the school' vibe to it! The school's way out in farm country and the country is really close minded. I was walking around like Robert Smith with real big hair, big baggy black clothes, black fingernail polish and eye makeup. They just didn't get it. We hated the town."

Moving to Chicago, Illinois, in 1985, the original lineup for Stabbing Westward consisted of Hall on bass and lead vocals, Flakus on keyboards, and Jim Clanin on guitars. Clanin would briefly be replaced on guitars by Andrew Hunter, and bassist Jim Sellers was added on as well. Angelo Negrette was also added as a live drummer. This lineup of the band recorded the 1991 extended play tape Iwo Jesus, and featured four songs: an early version of "Violent Mood Swings" (titled "Violent Mood Swing"), "P.O.M.F." (which contains elements of the later song "The Thing I Hate"), an early version of "Shame", and "Plastic Jesus". "Violent Mood Swing" was also included on the 1992 compilation CD The Cyberflesh Conspiracy.

The band's official website stated that "the original EP was recorded on an eight-track tape machine synched to an Emax II Sampler and an EMU SP1200 sampling drum machine. 100 copies were originally printed and sold both at local shows and in the legendary Wax Trax Record store in Chicago."

Hall took a brief break to tour with the band Die Warzau as that group's percussionist before continuing to work on Stabbing Westward. The band later recruited Chris Vrenna (Nine Inch Nails) on drums to replace Negrette, as Hall had met Vrenna when playing in Die Warzau. Around the same time, Hall met Stuart Zechman through mutual acquaintances, and Zechman ultimately replaced Hunter as the band's guitarist. The lineup of Hall, Flakus, Sellers, Vrenna, and Zechman recorded a demo that ultimately landed Stabbing Westward their record deal with Columbia Records. The demo recordings included "Violent Mood Swings", "Lies", and "Nothing". They were recorded at a studio in Evanston, Illinois. Just days before a showcase concert in late 1993, Vrenna opted to focus full-time on Nine Inch Nails; thus, the band hired drummer David Suycott, who was a high school friend of Flakus. The stabilized lineup went on their first proper tour during the last two months of 1993, opening for Front 242.

=== Ungod (1993–1995) ===
With a solidified lineup including Zechman on guitar and Suycott on drums, the band in 1993 recorded at Eden Studios in London with producer John Fryer. This resulted in their major label (Columbia Records) debut album, Ungod, which was released on February 15, 1994. The band landed an opening slot on Depeche Mode's Devotional Tour in summer 1994, and opened North American tour dates in fall 1994 for Killing Joke, but Stabbing Westward's album sales still did not increase.

Suycott abruptly dropped out of the band toward the end of the Ungod tour. Andy Kubiszewski was called in to replace Suycott's position for the remainder of the shows. This fast replacement required Kubiszewski to learn all of Suycott's parts while on his flight to meet with the band. Kubiszewski became a permanent fixture of Stabbing Westward.

The "Thread Mix" of the song "Violent Mood Swings" was included in the soundtrack to the 1994 film Clerks, and briefly appeared in the movie itself for one scene. The song "Nothing" was featured in the 1995 motion picture Bad Boys, but was not included on the film's soundtrack release. "Nothing" was later included in the credits of the movie Johnny Mnemonic and both it and "Lost" were featured on the movie's soundtrack. The songs "Lies", "Lost", and "Can't Happen Here" were also all featured in the first Mortal Kombat movie in 1995; however, these songs were not featured on the CD soundtrack.

=== Wither Blister Burn & Peel (1995–1997) ===
When Stuart Zechman departed the band after the Ungod tour due to personal differences, the remaining band members found themselves without one of their major songwriters. New drummer Andy Kubiszewski took over some songwriting duties afterward. Prior to playing in Stabbing Westward, Kubiszewski had not only played drums in The The, recorded one song for Nine Inch Nails, and played in Prick, but had been the singer and songwriter in the Cleveland-based Exotic Birds. Shortly after Zechman's departure, Kubiszewski played the band dozens of demos and Exotic Birds recordings. Included were "What Do I Have to Do?", "Haunting Me", "Sometimes It Hurts", "Crushing Me", "Slipping Away", "Desperate Now", and "Goodbye". These tracks would later find space on both the Wither and Darkest Days albums. When the band headed to Bearsville Studios in Woodstock, New York, without a permanent guitar player, they decided to play all the guitar parts themselves, with Sellers and Kubiszewski taking on most of the guitar duties.

In 1996, the Wither Blister Burn & Peel LP became a success, landing them their first certified gold album, aided by the singles "Shame" and "What Do I Have to Do?" which granted the band heavy rotation on MTV, MuchMusic, and radio. Tour mates for this album included Sponge. "What Do I Have to Do?" was featured in 1997's Masterminds, as well as in the episode "Tempest" of Smallville years later. The band later recruited Mark Eliopulos after the Wither recording sessions were completed to handle the live element of the main guitar parts.

=== Darkest Days (1998–2000) ===
Stabbing Westward relocated to Los Angeles, where they began work on the 1998 album, titled Darkest Days. Darkest Days was envisioned as a four-act story by the band (but never marketed as such). This is the only release featuring studio work by Mark Eliopulos. The first single "Save Yourself" had success yet the album failed to sell as well as its predecessor. Stabbing Westward continued to tour with bands like Placebo, The Cult, Monster Magnet, and Depeche Mode, while playing numerous summer festivals. Due to a broken collarbone, Kubiszewski was forced to sit out the remainder of the touring cycle. He was replaced for a handful of dates by former drummer Chris Vrenna, followed by Geoff Dugmore, and then Johnny Haro for the remaining dates. Haro joined Econoline Crush after Kubiszewski's return in late 1998.

The song "The Thing I Hate" was featured as the opening theme song in the Sony PlayStation game Duke Nukem: Time to Kill, which was released in September 1998. A remixed version of the song "Torn Apart" was featured on the Spawn movie soundtrack in July 1997. The song "Save Yourself" was featured in the 1998 films Urban Legend and Tekken, in addition to the 2012 True Blood Season 5 finale. The song "Haunting Me" was featured in the opening scenes of the 1998 teen horror flick The Faculty.

In 2000, the day before the band was to fly to Hawaii to record the follow-up to Darkest Days with producer Bob Rock, the band was dropped by Columbia Records.

=== Stabbing Westward and breakup (2001–2002) ===
After signing with Koch Records, the new manager wanted the band to create an album with a heavy pop influence. Christopher Hall, Walter Flakus, and Mark Eliopulos fought against the decision. Mark Eliopulos was fired by the manager who then brought in Derrek Hawkins as both a studio and live musician, as well as a new producer, Ed Buller.

The demo for the self-titled album was considered too dark. Old guitar parts from the demos were muted and new pop-driven riffs were created by the new guitarist.

The self-titled album, Stabbing Westward, was released on May 22, 2001, and featured the hit "So Far Away". The album did well in Australia, but ultimately failed to sell worldwide. Before a fifth LP could be recorded, the band did not sign for a new record deal and formally announced that they had disbanded on February 9, 2002.

=== Post-breakup (2003–2015) ===
- Lead singer Christopher Hall formed the Los Angeles-based band The Dreaming in 2001. They released their debut album Etched In Blood in June 2008. Songs from the album received airplay on XM Satellite Radio and rock stations nationwide. The album was distributed in Hot Topic and Best Buy. The band spent three years touring as a headliner and co-headliners with bands such as Trust Company and Flaw. In November 2011, the band released its second album, Puppet. It reached No. 32 on the Billboard Heatseekers Albums chart. Their third album, Rise Again, was released in February 2015. From the Ashes, a remix album, was released in June 2017.
- Walter Flakus has been working with The Clay People and Chokt. He was the APD/Music Director/Afternoon host for Chicago alternative station 101 WKQX. He is now a midday DJ for the Chicago rock station WCHI-FM. He joined Hall's band The Dreaming in 2015.
- Jim Sellers and his wife opened a natural foods market called Sellers Market in 2005. It appears to have closed in 2012.
- Jim Clanin left the music industry. He owned and operated a Dairy Queen in Illinois.
- Andy Kubiszewski has filled in as the drummer for a handful of Prick shows, joined a new project called Affected with Chris Schleyer, written and produced several songs for the popular Russian pop duo t.A.T.u., and has composed music for dozens of TV shows, including Monster Garage, Monster House, Ax Men, America's Toughest Jobs, The Colony, and most recently Storage Wars. Other film credits include Jam. Andy also composes the music to the popular Habla Blah Blah line of kids CDs.
- Mark Eliopulos played guitar in the bands Violent New Breed, HTH, Super Model, and Brave Ulysses.
- Johnny Haro joined Econoline Crush after briefly playing drums for Stabbing Westward. He eventually formed The Dreaming along with Christopher Hall.
- Stuart Zechman retired from the music industry. He moved to New York and started a family.
- David Suycott joined Machines of Loving Grace in 1995 as their new drummer. He continues to do production and remix work with various bands.
- Derrek Hawkins continued to work in the music industry, notably contributing to the song "Outer Space" on Ace Frehley's 2009 solo album Anomaly.

In June 2010, a rumor was afloat that Stabbing Westward would reunite to tour and possibly work on new material; however, this proved false. In July 2012, a fan created a petition which asked frontman Christopher Hall to reconcile with his former Stabbing Westward bandmates for a reunion tour; again, the reunion never happened.

Christopher Hall, Walter Flakus, and Johnny Haro reunited at one of The Dreaming's shows in Las Vegas on November 15, 2013. Flakus would later join The Dreaming on a permanent basis.

=== Reunion and Chasing Ghosts (2015–present) ===
Stabbing Westward reunited in 2015 after Eliopulos joined them onstage to play a set of Stabbing Westward songs when the Dreaming came through Chicago on their "Rise Again" tour on June 11, 2015. The band officially reunited for two shows, which coincided with the band's 30th anniversary. The first show took place in Chicago on September 22, 2016, as a part of the Cold Waves Festival, a charity festival benefiting suicide prevention causes. The lineup featured Christopher Hall, Walter Flakus, Mark Eliopulos, and Johnny Haro along with Carlton Bost (mainly known from The Dreaming, and also the reunited bands Orgy and Berlin). Jim Sellers did not take part in the reunion because of work commitments. The second show took place at Dracula's Ball in Philadelphia on October 31, 2016, at the Trocadero Theatre.

In a January 2017 interview with audioBoom, Walter Flakus was asked if there would be more Stabbing Westward reunion shows in the future. His response was, "We'll see. I don't have anything planned yet, but I'm always open to opportunities. It was great to get back on stage and play those songs again." Dates for a full tour began to be announced in February 2017. The band also performed at the 2017 edition of Cold Waves Festival in Chicago, Illinois.

The band released new material after their formation, such as a re-recorded version of the song "Plastic Jesus" (released on the Cold Waves V compilation on September 22, 2016) and an outtake from 2001 entitled "Home in You" (released on the Cold Waves VI compilation on September 28, 2017).

On August 17, 2018, Johnny Haro had been "let go" from the band, and will not be participating in any further band activities. In his Facebook post of that date, he stated that "The Dreaming is done." Stabbing Westward announced Bobby Amaro, from Orgy, as a replacement for Haro. The band embarked on a U.S. tour from October to December 2018 by celebrating the 20th anniversary of the release of Darkest Days and performing most of the album, along with other songs.

In June 2019, the ensemble stated via their Facebook page that they were working on a new album, with Eliopulos via his Facebook site stating that he has left the band. In early 2020, 19 years after the band's self-titled album, the first proper release of all new material was put out by the band, titled Dead and Gone.

In May 2020, the band announced their signing to label COP International for their forthcoming studio album Chasing Ghosts, the band's first full studio album since 2001. The lead single was "I Am Nothing" and the album was released on March 18, 2022.

== Musical style and influences ==
Stabbing Westward is most commonly described as industrial rock and alternative rock, but also as industrial metal, alternative metal and nu metal. The group has often been compared to Nine Inch Nails; according to Alan Escher of AllMusic, however, the band "owe more to the British synth poppers Depeche Mode than anyone." Christopher Hall's vocals have been compared to Nine Inch Nails singer Trent Reznor. Stabbing Westward's debut album Ungod has been described by Escher as "lo-fi aggro-synth assault". Stabbing Westward moved to a very guitar-driven sound on Wither Blister Burn & Peel. The self-titled album in 2001 shows a less heavy and more melodic sound than previous albums. Stabbing Westward's influences include Ministry, Revolting Cocks, Nine Inch Nails, Depeche Mode, Soundgarden, The Cure, Bauhaus, The Sisters of Mercy, Joy Division, and Pearl Jam.

== Members ==
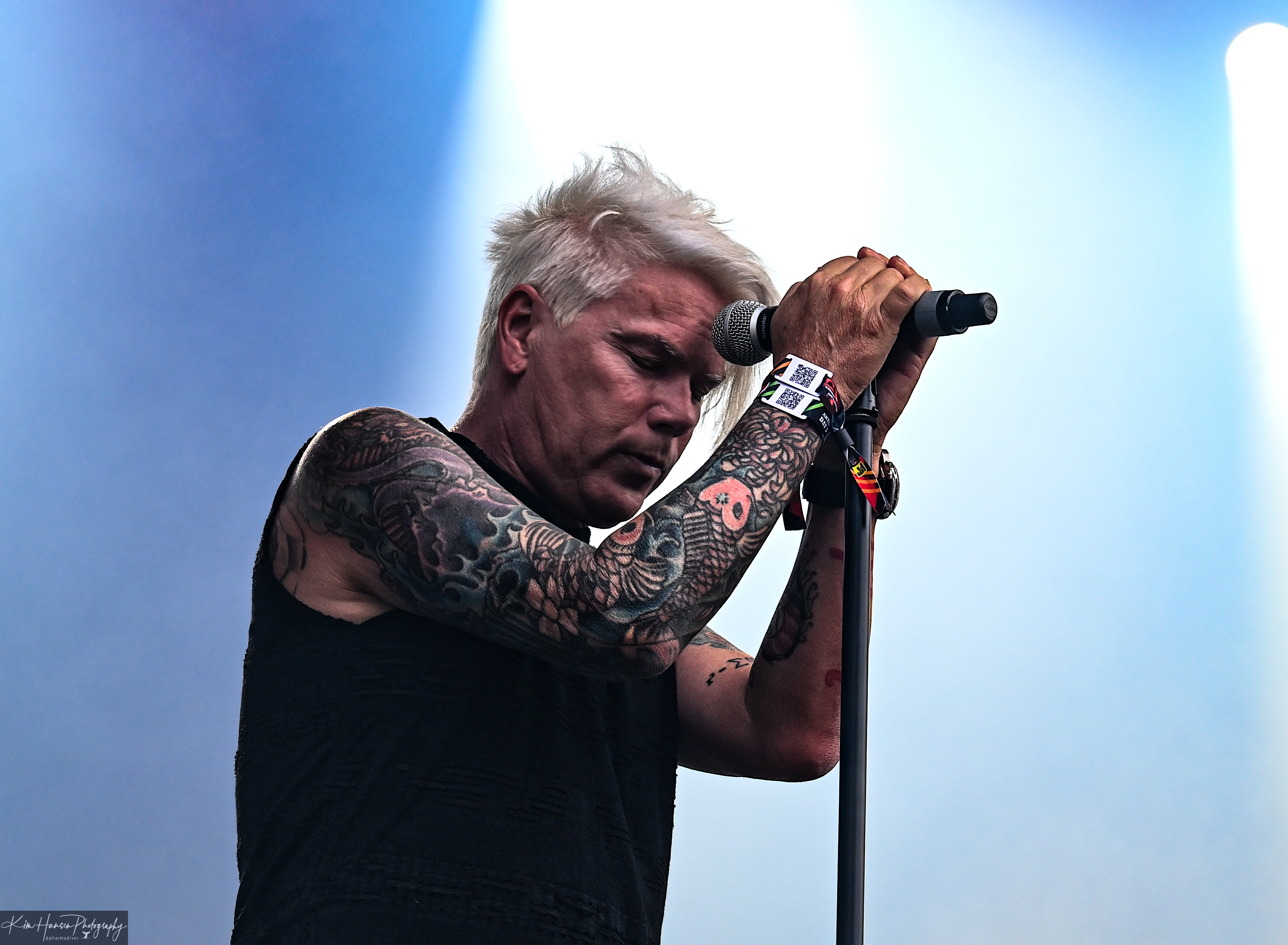
Christopher Hall

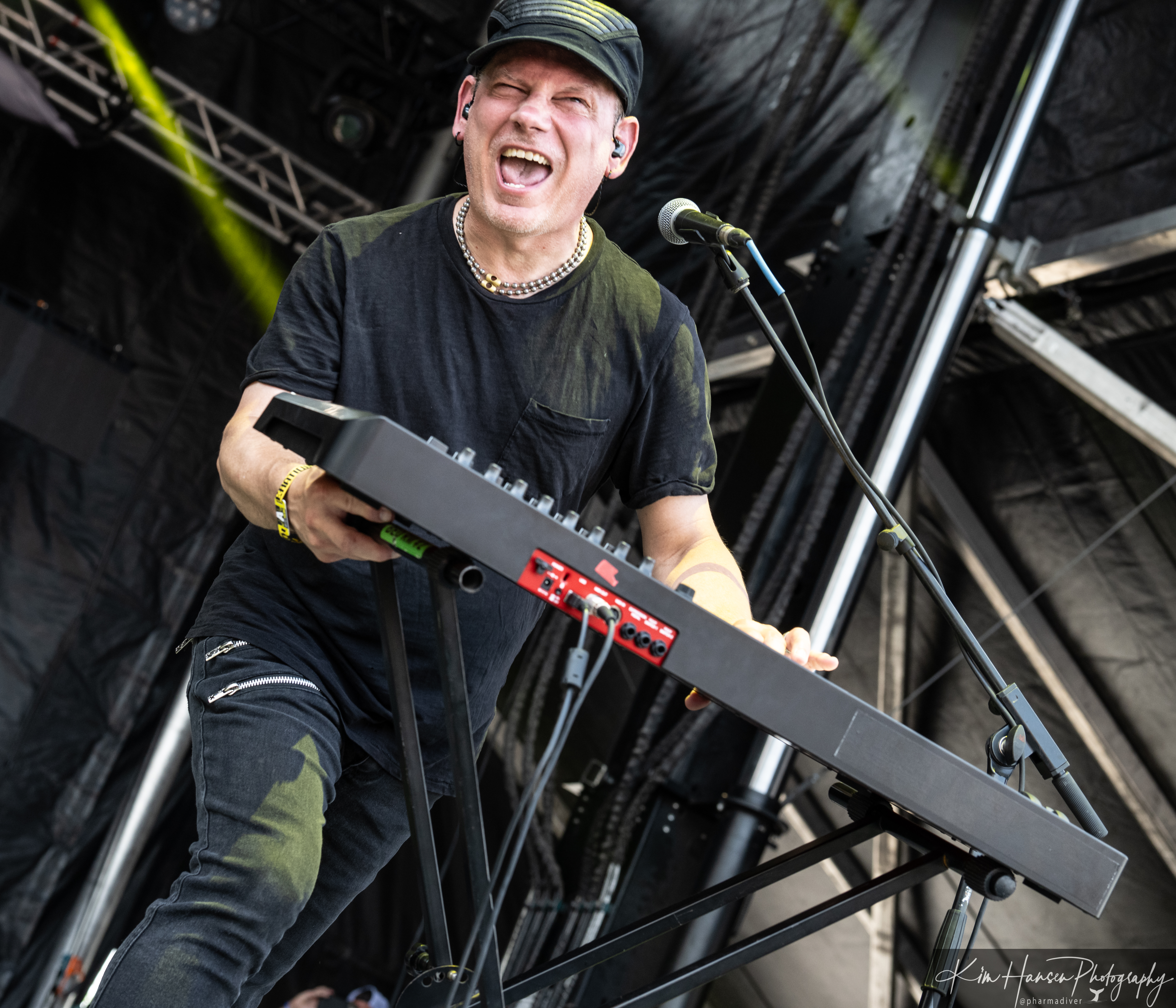
Walter Flakus

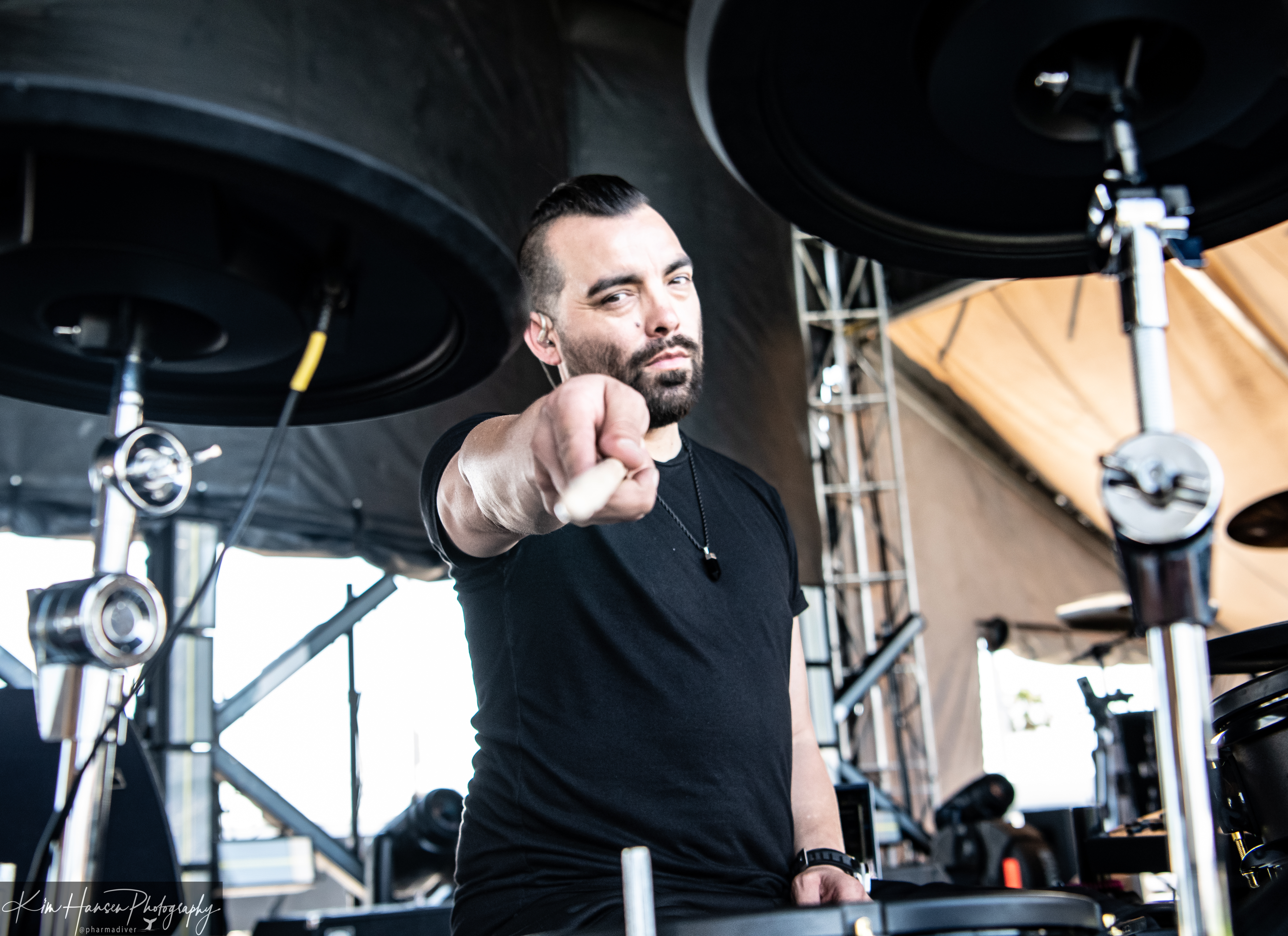
Bobby Amaro

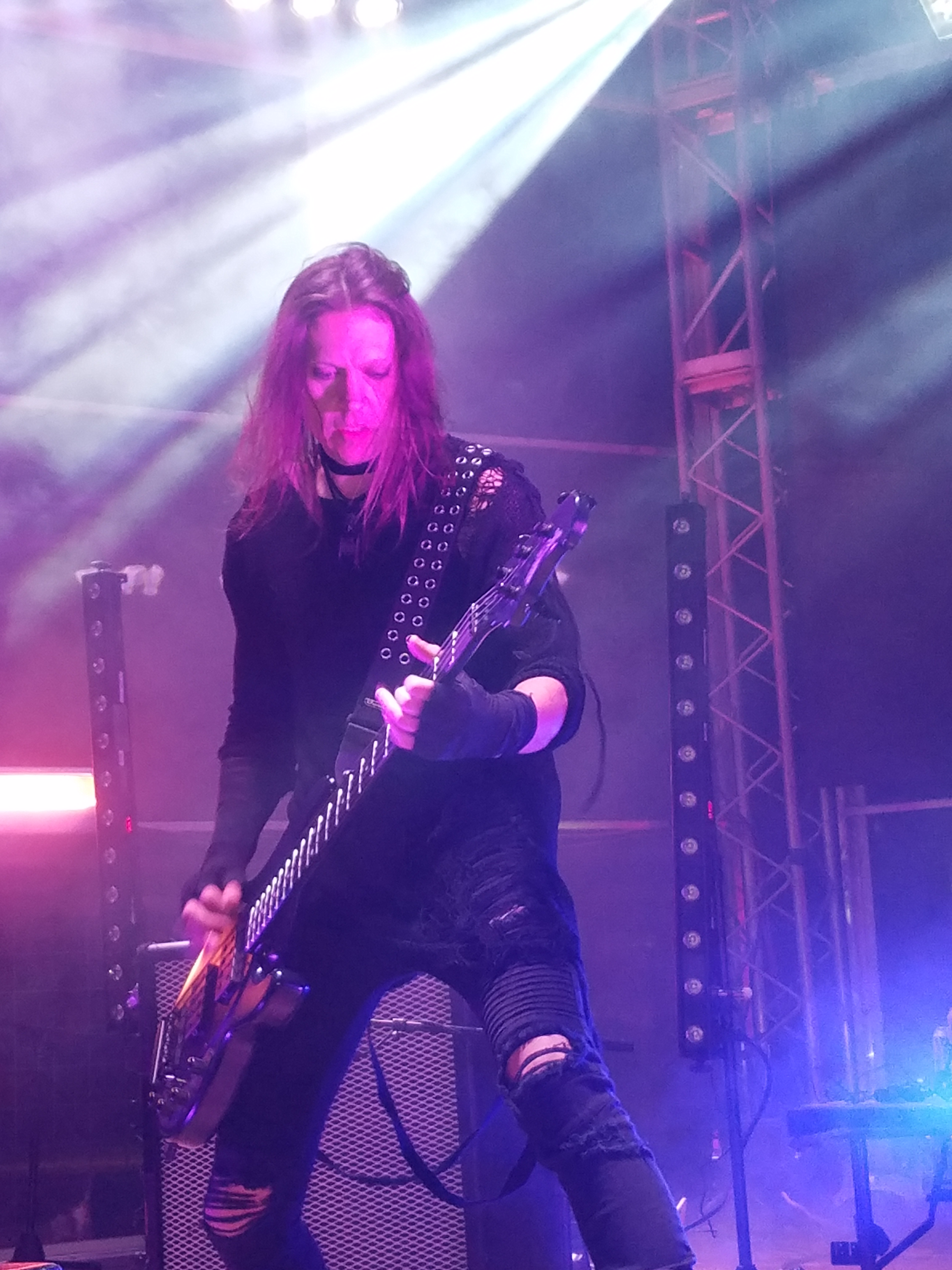
Carlton Bost

=== Current ===
- Christopher Hall – lead vocals, guitars, keyboards, drum machine programming (1985–2002, 2016–present)
- Walter Flakus – keyboards, programming, backing vocals, guitars (1985–2002, 2016–present)
- Bobby Amaro – drums (2018–present)
- Carlton Bost – bass, guitars (2016–2024, 2026–present)

=== Former ===
- Jim Clanin – guitars (1985–1990)
- Jim Sellers – bass (1990–2002)
- Andrew Hunter – guitars (1990–1992)
- Angelo Negrette – drums (1990–1992; died 2019)
- Chris Vrenna – drums (1992–1993, 1998)
- Stuart Zechman – guitars (1992–1995)
- David Suycott – drums (1993–1994)
- Andy Kubiszewski – drums, guitars, keyboards, backing vocals (1994–1998, 1998–2002)
- Mark Eliopulos – guitars, backing vocals (1995–1999, 2016–2019)
- Geoff Dugmore – drums (1998)
- Johnny Haro – drums (1998, 2016–2018)
- Derrek Hawkins – guitars, backing vocals (1999–2002)
- Cyamak Ashtiani – guitars, backing vocals (2024–2025)

=== Timeline ===
Color denotes main live duty.

== Discography ==
Stabbing Westward discography
- Studio albums: 5
- EPs: 3
- Compilation albums: 2
- Singles: 13
- Music videos: 11

=== Studio albums ===
Year	Title	Chart positions				Certifications (sales thresholds)	Sales
Year	Title	US	US Heat.	US Ind.	AUS	Certifications (sales thresholds)	Sales
1994	Ungod: Released: February 15, 1994; Label: Columbia; Format: CD, LP, MC, MD	—	—	—	—		US: 150,000
1996	Wither Blister Burn & Peel: Released: January 23, 1996; Label: Columbia; Format: CD, LP, MC	67	1	—	—	RIAA: Gold	US: 747,000
1998	Darkest Days: Released: April 7, 1998; Label: Columbia; Format: CD, HDCD, LP, MC	52	—	—	79	RIAA: Gold	US: 502,000
2001	Stabbing Westward: Released: May 22, 2001; Label: Koch; Format: CD, MC	47	—	2	97		US: 140,000
2022	Chasing Ghosts: Released: March 18, 2022; Label: COP International; Format: CD	—	—	—	—		
"-" denotes a recording that did not chart or was not released in that territory.

=== Remix albums ===
Year	Name	Label
2026	Wither ReWired	COP International

=== Compilation albums ===
Year	Name	Label
2003	The Essential Stabbing Westward	Sony
2003	What Do I Have to Do?	Sony

=== EPs ===
Year	Name	Label
1992	Iwo Jesus	Self-released
2019	Iwo Jesus	Self-released
2020	Dead and Gone	Self-released
2020	Hallowed Hymns	COP International

=== Singles ===
Year	Song	Chart positions				Album
Year	Song	US Airplay	US Modern	US Main.	AUS	Album
1993	"Violent Mood Swings"	—	—	—	—	Ungod
1994	"Control"	—	—	—	—	Ungod
1994	"Lies"	—	—	—	—	Ungod
1994	"Nothing"	—	—	—	—	Ungod
1996	"What Do I Have to Do?"	60	11	7	—	Wither Blister Burn & Peel
1996	"Shame"	69	14	7	—	Wither Blister Burn & Peel
1998	"Sometimes It Hurts"	—	39	20	—	Darkest Days
1998	"Save Yourself"	—	20	4	64	Darkest Days
1999	"Haunting Me"	—	34	19	—	Darkest Days
2001	"So Far Away"	—	21	23	85	Stabbing Westward
2020	"Dead and Gone"	—	—	—	—	Dead and Gone
2021	"I Am Nothing"	—	—	—	—	Chasing Ghosts
2022	"Ghost"	—	—	—	—	Chasing Ghosts
"—" denotes a recording that did not chart or was not released in that territory.

- The songs "What Do I Have to Do?" and "Shame" were not released as commercial singles, and they charted on the Billboard Hot 100 Airplay as they received airplay.

==== Promotional singles ====
Year	Song	Album
1996	"I Don't Believe"	Wither Blister Burn & Peel
2001	"Angel"	Stabbing Westward

==== Other songs ====
- "Dawn" was featured on the Escape from L.A. soundtrack in 1996.
- "Torn Apart" (Josh Wink Remix) was featured on the Spawn soundtrack in 1997.
- "So Wrong" was featured on the Bride of Chucky soundtrack in 1998.
- "Top of the World" (The Carpenters cover) was featured on the Triple M Musical Challenge II compilation in 2001.
- "Bizarre Love Triangle" (New Order cover) was featured on the Not Another Teen Movie soundtrack in 2001.
- "Plastic Jesus" (re-recorded song, originally from the Iwo Jesus extended play) was featured on the Cold Waves V compilation in 2016.
- "Home In You" was featured on the Cold Waves VI compilation in 2017.

=== Music videos ===
List of music videos
Year	Title	Director
1994	"Lies"	Peter Christopherson
1994	"Nothing"	Julie Hermelin
1996	"What Do I Have To Do?"	Josh Taft
1996	"Shame"	Paul Cunningham
1998	"Sometimes It Hurts"	Kevin Kerslake
1998	"Save Yourself"	Matt Donaldson
2001	"So Far Away"	Shawn Foster
2020	"Dead and Gone"	Vincente Cordero
2020	"Crawl"	Vincente Cordero
2020	"Cold"	Christopher Hall
2022	"Ghost"	Christopher Hall
