= John Malm Jr. =

American music manager

John A. Malm Jr.
- Born: Cleveland, Ohio, U.S.
- Education: Denison University
- Occupations: Manager, record label owner
- Known for: Managing Nine Inch Nails, Nothing Records

John A. Malm Jr. is the former manager of Trent Reznor and his band Nine Inch Nails. He was also a co-founder, along with Reznor, of Nothing Records.

== Early career and collaboration with Trent Reznor ==
Malm grew up in Cleveland and completed a degree at Denison University in Mass Media Communications, with a minor in film. During this time, he managed his university radio station. He knew at an early age that he wanted to work in the music industry. He was inspired to aim towards artist management after meeting Todd Rundgren's manager, Eric Gardner, to organise an interview for his radio station. After graduation, Malm worked in his family's machine equipment business by day and by night was a part-time promoter of local music acts, including the Exotic Birds, Lucky Pierre and System 56. He left the family business to manage the Birds full-time, in which Reznor was a "bit player". Malm quit in 1987 due to differences in artistic direction, and Reznor also quit shortly afterward. He took on Reznor as his client informally, without a written contract, after hearing some of Reznor's demo work that the latter had recorded independently at Right Track Studio.

Reznor's career took off quickly once NIN was formed. NIN performed its first show in 1988, and later that same year attracted interest from recording companies. Malm hired an attorney, Michael Toorock, to assist in negotiating a record contract between Reznor and TeeVee Toons, Inc. (aka TVT Records).

== Managing Nine Inch Nails' early successes and development ==
NIN's first album Pretty Hate Machine was a great commercial success, but due to creative interference from TVT, Malm and Reznor decided to terminate the record deal. While extricating themselves from the TVT contract, Reznor secretly recorded the next NIN EP Broken to release on their new label Nothing Records. Under the arrangements they negotiated while still under contract to TVT, Nothing Records would completely produce and control all NIN material, merchandise and marketing material, then release it through their major partner Interscope Records. The deal ensured that Reznor and Malm owned Nothing Records and had a remarkable total artistic control over the material. Nothing Records went on to release many NIN releases and later became a stand-alone record company, signing and developing its own artists, including Marilyn Manson and Prick while also offering label support or distribution to established bands such as Autechre, Meat Beat Manifesto, and Pop Will Eat Itself.

== Lawsuit and counter-lawsuit ==
In 2004, Malm filed suit in the United States district court of Ohio against Reznor for over $2 million in deferred commissions. The suit alleged that Reznor "reneged on every single contract he and Malm ever entered into", and that Reznor refused to pay Malm payments which he was contractually entitled. Weeks later, Reznor filed a countersuit in the U.S. District Court of New York, charging Malm with fraud and breach of fiduciary duties. Reznor's suit arose from a five-year management contract signed in the earliest days of Nine Inch Nails, between Reznor and Malm's management company J. Artist Management. This contract, according to the suit, was unlawful and immoral in that it secured Malm 20% of Reznor's gross earnings, rather than his net earnings. The suit also alleged that the contract secured this percentage even if Malm was no longer representing Reznor, and for all Reznor's album advances. The suit also described how Malm had misappropriated the ownership rights regarding Nine Inch Nails, including the trademark name "NIN". According to testimony by Malm, Reznor gave him half of the "NIN" trademark "as a gift".

Reznor stated that he began to fully understand his financial situation after tackling his addiction to drugs and alcohol. Reznor requested a financial statement from Malm in 2003, only to discover that he had only $400,000 in liquid assets. "It was not pleasant discovering you have a 10th as much as you've been told you have", Reznor told the court. Malm's lawyers, however, claimed that Malm had worked for years "pro bono", and that Reznor's inability to release an album or tour and his uninhibited spending were the reasons for his financial situation.

After a two-week trial in 2005, the jury sided with Reznor, awarding him $2.93 million in damages. The court returned complete control of the trademarks to Reznor and awarded an additional $1.69 million in calculated interest.
