= Christopher Hall (musician) =

American musician (born 1966)

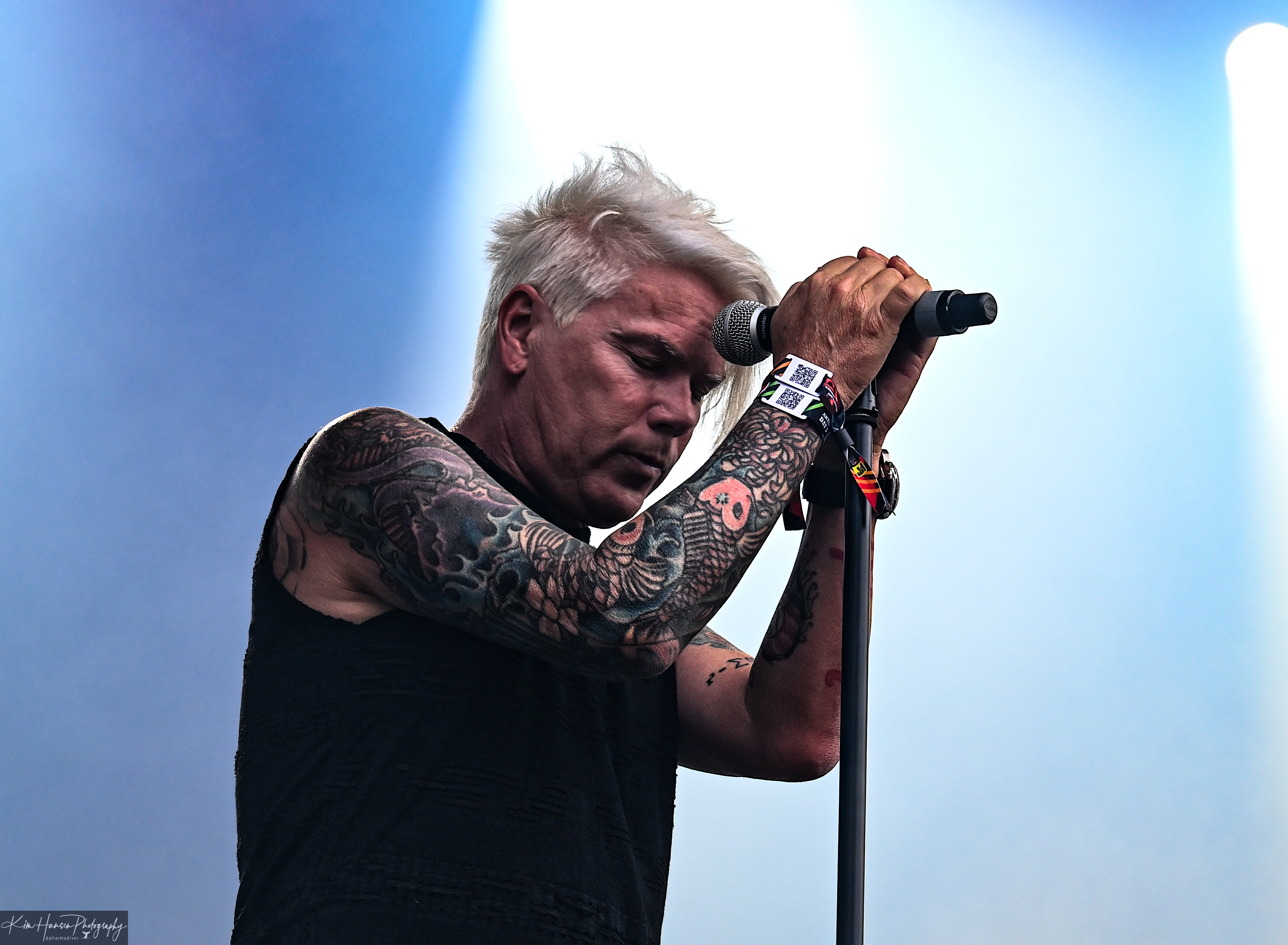
- Hall performing live with Stabbing Westward in 2022 Ostend, Belgium.

Background information
- Born: Robert Christopher Hall; May 18, 1965 (age 61); Illinois, US
- Genres: Industrial rock; alternative rock
- Occupation: Musician
- Instruments: Vocals, guitar, keyboards
- Labels: Columbia Records, Koch Records, Sony Records, DC Records
- Member of: Stabbing Westward
- Formerly of: The Dreaming
- Website: stabbingwestward.bandcamp.com

Robert Christopher Hall (born May 18, 1965) is an American musician best known as a founding member and vocalist for the industrial rock band Stabbing Westward. Hall met keyboardist Walter Flakus in 1984 and formed the band in Macomb, Illinois. Hall founded a new band, The Dreaming in 2001 shortly before the breakup of Stabbing Westward in 2002. After reuniting in 2016, Hall has remained active with Stabbing Westward and released a new album, titled Chasing Ghosts in March 2022.

== Personal life ==
Hall has stated that he attended Western Illinois University during the early years of Stabbing Westward, alongside keyboardist Walter Flakus. Hall is married and has two sons.

== Discography ==
=== Stabbing Westward ===
1994 - Ungod

1996 - Wither Blister Burn & Peel

1998 - Darkest Days

2001 - Stabbing Westward

2022 - Chasing Ghosts

=== The Dreaming ===
2008 - Etched In Blood

2011 - Puppet

2015 - Rise Again
