= Andy Kubiszewski =

American drummer

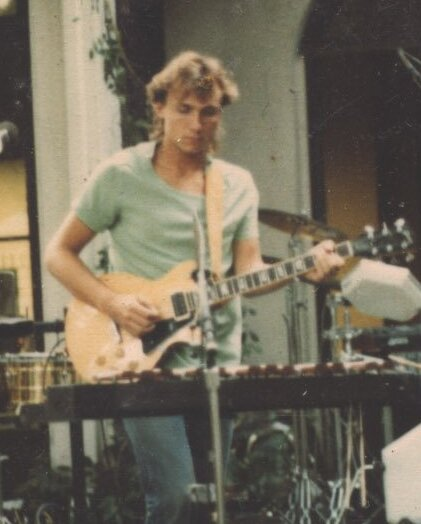
- Kubiszewski in 1984

Background information
- Born: September 30, 1961 (age 64); Charleston, South Carolina, U.S.
- Origin: Virginia Beach, Virginia, U.S.
- Genres: Industrial rock, alternative rock, synthpop, new wave, classical, jazz
- Occupations: Musician, composer, songwriter, producer, remixer
- Instruments: Drums, percussion, vocals, guitar, keyboards, programming
- Years active: 1980–present

Andrew Kubiszewski (KOO-bi-SHEV-skee; born September 30, 1961) is an American musician, songwriter, remixer and producer. He has worked with bands Exotic Birds and Stabbing Westward, contributed to several other bands, and composed music for TV shows and films.

== Early life and education ==
Kubiszewski attended Case Western Reserve University and the Cleveland Institute of Music where he studied percussion.

== Career ==
=== Exotic Birds ===
In 1982, Kubiszewski, Tom Freer and Timothy Adams Jr. formed the synthpop group, Exotic Birds, while they were studying at the Cleveland Institute of Music. The three wrote their own music, and Kubiszewski was lead singer and guitarist. They achieved local success, appearing as an opening band for Culture Club, Eurythmics, and Information Society. Frank Vale joined the band as an additional keyboardist in September 1984.

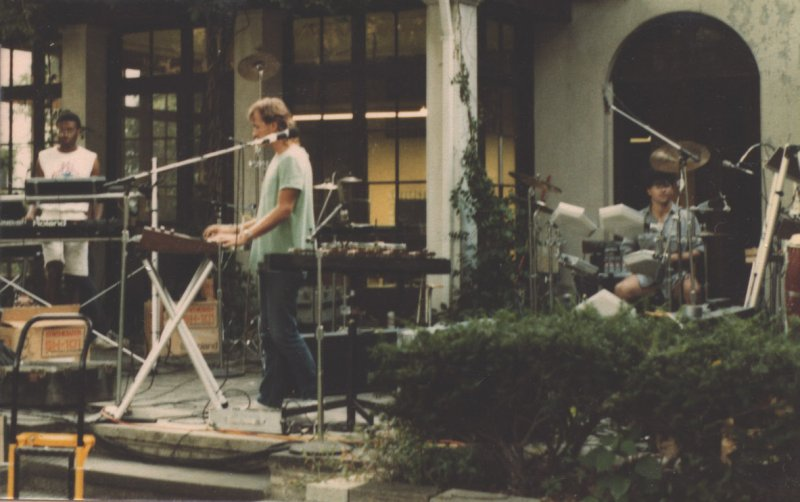
Adams, Kubiszewski, and Freer in 1984

The band broke up for the first time in February 1985, but reformed a year later as a five-piece band. The line up changed and members came and went over the years.

In 1993, Kubiszewski left the group to play drums with and later for Crowded House, The The, Nine Inch Nails, and Prick although he returned for a final gig on January 22, 1994.

=== Stabbing Westward ===
In 1996, Kubiszewski joined the band Stabbing Westward as drummer.

The band, which originally consisted of guitarist, Christopher Hall, keyboardists, Walter Flakus and Stuart Zechman and drummer, David Suycott, released its debut album in 1994. David Suycott abruptly dropped out of the band toward the end of the Ungod tour and Andy Kubiszewski was called in to replace Suycott for the remainder of the shows. This fast replacement required Kubiszewski to learn all of Suycott's parts while on his flight to meet with the band. Kubiszewski would become a permanent fixture of Stabbing Westward.

Jim Sellers, and Mark Eliopoulous also joined the group in 1996. After Zechman's departure, Kubiszewski took over some songwriting duties as well as some guitar duties. He played the band dozens of demos and Exotic Birds recordings, and a number of those tracks ended up on Stabbing Westward's Wither and Darkest Days albums.

Kubiszewski broke his collarbone about 1999 and sat out a part of the Darkest Days tour where he was replaced by drummer Chris Vrenna and Johnny Haro for the remaining dates of the tour. Before a fifth LP could be recorded, the band formally disbanded on February 9, 2002.

=== Later career ===
Kubiszewski filled in as the drummer for a handful of Prick shows, joined a new project called Affected with Chris Schleyer, wrote and produced several songs for the popular Russian pop duo t.A.T.u., and composed music for dozens of TV shows, including Monster Garage, Monster House, Ax Men, America's Toughest Jobs, The Colony, and Storage Wars. He also had a film credit with Jam and composed the music to the popular Habla Blah Blah line of kids CDs.

== Discographies ==
=== Rock ===
- 1984 | Exotic Birds | Exotic Birds | Songwriter, Vocals, Guitar, Percussion
- 1986 | Exotic Birds | L'oiseau | Songwriter, Vocals, Guitar, Percussion
- 1989 | Exotic Birds | Equilibrium (Pleasureland) | Songwriter, Vocals, Guitar, Percussion
- 1990 | Exotic Birds | Equilibrium (Alpha International) | Songwriter, Vocals, Guitar, Percussion
- 1993 | The The | Dis-Infected | Drums
- 1994 | The The | Solitude | Drums
- 1994 | Nine Inch Nails | The Downward Spiral | Drums
- 1995 | Prick | Prick | Drums
- 1996 | Stabbing Westward | Wither Blister Burn & Peel | Songwriter, Drums, Guitar, Programming, Background Vocals
- 1998 | Stabbing Westward | Darkest Days | Songwriter, Drums, Keyboards, Additional Vocals, Guitar
- 2001 | Stabbing Westward | Stabbing Westward | Songwriter, Drums, Vibraphone, Marimba, Keyboards, Acoustic Guitar
- 2002 | Twinstar | Twinstar | Drums, Loops, Sequences
- 2003 | Darling Waste | Truth About Lies | Drums
- 2003 | The Margot Catcher | Middle of the Blue | Drums
- 2004 | State of Being | Haywire | Production, Drums
- 2004 | Lucky Pierre | ThinKing | Drums, Co-producer
- 2005 | Andrea Summer | Lifeblood | Drums
- 2005 | Darling Waste | Manifest Destiny Rebellion | Drums
- 2005 | The Margot Catcher | The Line is a Dot | Drums
- 2005 | t.A.T.u. | Dangerous and Moving | Songwriter, Production, Drums - Loves Me Not
- 2005 | KOTO | " What's Up?" | Songwriter, Drums, Guitar
- 2005 | DOOM | Original Motion Picture Soundtrack | Drums
- 2006 | t.A.T.u. | "The Best" | Songwriter, Production, Drums - "Loves Me Not"
- 2008 | Death Sentence | Original Motion Picture Soundtrack | "A Message" songwriter/performer - remix by Charlie Clouser
- 2008 | t.A.T.u. | Vesyolye Ulybki | Songwriter - "You and I"
- 2009 | (sic) | (sic) | Drums, arranger
- 2009 | Darling Waste | I Am Born | Drums
- 2020 | Discothèque | EP 1 | Songwriter - Producer - Modular Synthesizer
- 2020 | Cities and Empires | Cities and Empires | Songwriter - Producer - Modular Synthesizers - Drums - Background vocals
- 2021 | Discothèque | EP 2.0 | Songwriter - Producer - Modular Synthesizer
- 2021 | Discothèque | REMIXED EP | Songwriter - Producer - Modular Synthesizer
- 2022 | Discothèque | Moments of Madness - single | Songwriter - Producer - Modular Synthesizer
- 2023 | Discothèque | Tiny Little Pieces - maxi-single | Songwriter - Producer - Modular Synthesizer

=== Jazz/new age ===
- Jim Brickman, By Heart Windham Hill
- La Vienta/Jazz Menco, Telarc International
- Travelin' Light: Sam Pilafian and Frank Vignola, Makin' Whoopee Telarc International
- Travelin' Light: Sam Pilafian and Frank Vignola, Christmas with Travelin' Light Telarc International
- Santa's Bag, (Various Artists) An All-Star Jazz Christmas Telarc International

=== Educational ===
- 2007 | "habla blah blah" | Educational CD |Composer, Producer, Multi- Instrumentalist
- 2008 | "habla blah blah" volume 2 | Educational CD |Composer, Producer, Multi- Instrumentalist

== Awards ==
- 2015 BMI TV MUSIC AWARD - Original underscore and Theme for "MARRIED TO THE JOB"
- 2011 BMI TV MUSIC AWARD - Original underscore and Theme for "STORAGE WARS"
- 2011 BMI TV MUSIC AWARD - Original underscore and Theme for "THE COLONY"

== TV and film scores ==
- 2023 - "STORAGE WARS" - Season 15 ( TV Series Documentary )- composer - A&E
- 2022 - "STORAGE WARS" - Season 14 ( TV Series Documentary )- composer - A&E
- 2021 - "STORAGE WARS" - Season 13 ( TV Series Documentary )- composer - A&E
- 2021 - "MONSTER GARAGE" - Season 6 reboot ( TV Series Documentary )- composer - DISCOVERY CHANNEL
- 2019 - “POSE” - Season 2 ( TV Series )- additional music - FX
- 2019 - “EUPHORIA” - Season 1 ( TV Series )- composer - additional music - HBO
- 2019 - “AXMEN” - Season 10 ( TV Series Documentary )- composer - HISTORY CHANNEL
- 2018 - "THE RETURN OF SHELBY THE SWAMP MAN" - Season 1 ( TV Series Documentary )- composer - HISTORY CHANNEL
- 2018 - "BUSH LEAGUE BUILD-OFF" - Season 1 ( TV Series Documentary )- composer - HISTORY CHANNEL
- 2018 - "STORAGE WARS" - Season 12 ( TV Series Documentary )- composer - A&E
- 2017 - "STORAGE WARS" - Season 11 ( TV Series Documentary )- composer - A&E
- 2017 - "STORAGE WARS" - Season 10 ( TV Series Documentary )- composer - A&E
- 2017 - "FIRE CHASERS" ( Documentary )- composer - NETFLIX
- 2017 - "TWO DEGREES" - 2 Hr Special ( TV Series Documentary )- composer - HISTORY CHANNEL
- 2017 - "STORAGE WARS" - Season 9 ( TV Series Documentary )- composer - A&E
- 2017 - "ICE ROAD TRUCKERS" - Season 11 (TV Series) - composer - HISTORY CHANNEL
- 2016 - "DEADLIEST CATCH - DUNGENESS COVE" - Season 1 ( TV Series Documentary )- composer - DISCOVERY CHANNEL
- 2016 - "ICE ROAD TRUCKERS" - Season 10 (TV Series) - composer - HISTORY CHANNEL
- 2015 - "BADLANDS -TEXAS" - Season 1 ( TV Series Documentary )- composer - NATIONAL GEOGRAPHIC CHANNEL
- 2015 - "APPALACHIAN OUTLAWS" - Season 2 ( TV Series Documentary )- composer - HISTORY CHANNEL
- 2015 - "AXMEN" - Season 9 ( TV Series Documentary )- composer - HISTORY CHANNEL
- 2015 - "AXMEN" - Season 8 ( TV Series Documentary )- composer - HISTORY CHANNEL
- 2015 - "MARRIED TO THE JOB" - Season 1 ( TV Series Documentary )- composer - A&E
- 2015 - "STORAGE WARS" - Season 8 ( TV Series Documentary )- composer - A&E
- 2015 - "STORAGE WARS" - Season 7 ( TV Series Documentary )- composer - A&E
- 2015 - "STORAGE WARS" - Season 6 ( TV Series Documentary )- composer - A&E
- 2015 - "ICE ROAD TRUCKERS" - Season 9 (TV Series) - composer - HISTORY CHANNEL
- 2014 - "STORAGE WARS" - Season 5 ( TV Series Documentary )- composer - A&E
- 2014 - "BARRY'D TREASURE" - Season 1 ( TV Series Documentary )- composer - A&E
- 2014 - "OFF ROADS WARRIORS - ALASKA" - Season 1 ( TV Series Documentary )- composer - HISTORY CHANNEL
- 2014 - "APPALACHIAN OUTLAWS" - Season 1 ( TV Series Documentary )- composer - HISTORY CHANNEL
- 2014 - "MISSISSIPPI MEN" - Season 1 ( TV Series Documentary )- composer - A&E
- 2014 - "ICE ROAD TRUCKERS" - Season 8 (TV Series) - composer - HISTORY CHANNEL
- 2013 - "THE LEGEND OF SHELBY THE SWAMP MAN" - Season 1 ( TV Series Documentary )- composer - HISTORY CHANNEL
- 2013 - "AXMEN" - Season 7 ( TV Series Documentary )- composer - HISTORY CHANNEL
- 2013 - "AXMEN" - Season 6 ( TV Series Documentary )- composer - HISTORY CHANNEL
- 2013 - "STORAGE WARS NEW YORK" - Season 1 ( TV Series )- composer - A&E
- 2013 - "AMERICAN HOGGERS" - Season 3 ( TV Series Documentary )- composer - A&E
- 2013 - "STORAGE WARS TEXAS" - Season 3 ( TV Series Documentary )- composer - A&E
- 2013 - "STORAGE WARS" - Season 4 ( TV Series )- composer - A&E
- 2013 - "ICE ROAD TRUCKERS" - Season 7 (TV Series) - composer - HISTORY CHANNEL
- 2012 - "GUTTERSNIPE" ( Short )- composer
- 2012 - "AMERICA'S LOST TREASURES" ( TV Series Documentary )- composer - NATIONAL GEOGRAPHIC CHANNEL
- 2012 - "AMERICAN HOGGERS" - Season 2 ( TV Series Documentary )- composer - A&E
- 2012 - "STORAGE WARS TEXAS" - Season 2 ( TV Series Documentary )- composer - A&E
- 2012 - "STORAGE WARS" - Season 3 ( TV Series )- composer - A&E
- 2012 - "ICE ROAD TRUCKERS" - Season 6 (TV Series) - composer - HISTORY CHANNEL
- 2011 - "COAL" ( TV Series Documentary )- composer - SPIKE TV
- 2011 - "STORAGE WARS" - Season 2 ( TV Series )- composer - A&E
- 2011 - "ALASKAN MONSTER HUNT: Hillstranded" ( TV Series Documentary )- composer - DISCOVERY CHANNEL
- 2011 - "INSPECTOR AMERICA" ( TV Series Documentary )- composer - HISTORY CHANNEL
- 2011 - "AMERICAN HOGGERS" - Season 1( TV Series Documentary )- composer - A&E
- 2011 - "AXMEN" - Season 5 ( TV Series Documentary )- composer - HISTORY CHANNEL
- 2011 - "STORAGE WARS TEXAS" - Season 1( TV Series Documentary )- composer - A&E
- 2011 - "BLACK GOLD" - Season 3 ( TV Series Documentary )- composer - TRU TV
- 2011 - "I.R.T.: DEADLIEST ROADS" - Season 2 (TV Series) - composer - HISTORY CHANNEL
- 2010 - "STORAGE WARS" - Season 1 ( TV Series Documentary )- composer - A&E
- 2010 - "THE COLONY" - Season 2( TV Series Documentary )- composer - DISCOVERY CHANNEL
- 2010 - "SWORDS- LIFE ON THE LINE" - Season 3 ( TV Series Documentary )- composer - DISCOVERY CHANNEL
- 2010 - "AXMEN" - Season 4 ( TV Series Documentary )- composer - HISTORY CHANNEL
- 2009 - "THE LOCATOR" - Season 3 ( TV Series Documentary )- composer - WE TV
- 2009 - "AXMEN" - Season 3 ( TV Series Documentary )- composer - HISTORY CHANNEL
- 2009 - "THE COLONY" - Season 1( TV Series Documentary )- composer - DISCOVERY CHANNEL
- 2008 - "AXMEN" - Season 2 ( TV Series Documentary )- composer - HISTORY CHANNEL
- 2008 - "AMERICA'S TOUGHEST JOBS ( TV Series Documentary )- composer - NBC
- 2008 - "LA HARDHATS" ( TV Series Documentary )- composer - HISTORY CHANNEL
- 2008 - " 1000 WAYS TO DIE" - ( TV Series Pilot ) - composer - SPIKE TV
- 2008 - "AMERICA'S PORT" ( TV Series Documentary )- composer - HISTORY CHANNEL
- 2007 - "TWISTER SISTERS" ( TV Series Documentary )- composer - HISTORY CHANNEL
- 2007 - "SO YOU'VE DOWNLOADED A DEMON" ( Film ) - composer
- 2007 - "MORE CRAZY CHRISTMAS LIGHTS" ( TV Series Documentary ) - composer
- 2006 - "JAM" ( Film ) - composer
- 2006 - "MONSTER GARAGE" - Season 5 ( TV Series Documentary )- composer - DISCOVERY CHANNEL
- 2006 - "CRAZY CHRISTMAS LIGHTS" ( TV Series Documentary ) - composer
- 2005 - "MONSTER GARAGE" - Season 4 ( TV Series Documentary )- composer - DISCOVERY CHANNEL
- 2004 - "MONSTER GARAGE" - Season 3 ( TV Series Documentary )- composer - DISCOVERY CHANNEL
- 1998 - "FIVE O'CLOCK SHADOW" ( Short ) - co-composer
