= Exotic Birds =

American synthpop music group

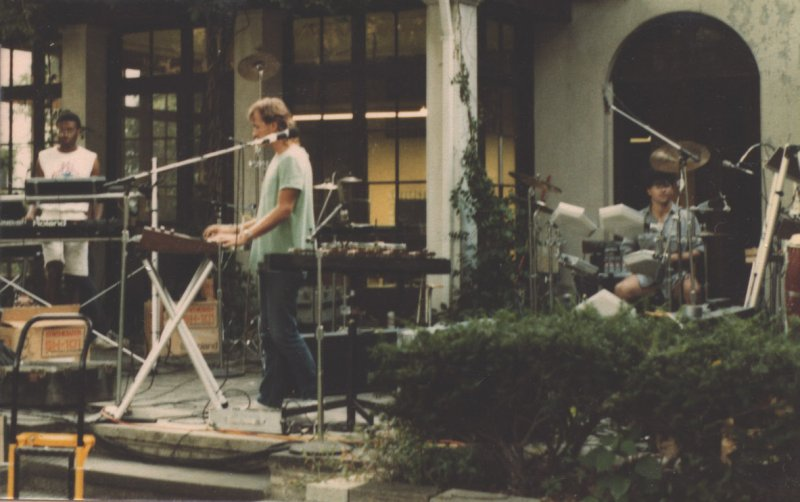
- Exotic Birds in September 1984. From left to right: Adams, Kubiszewski and Freer

Background information
- Origin: Cleveland, Ohio, United States
- Genres: Synth-pop
- Years active: 1982–1985, 1986-1987, 1988–1993, 1994
- Past members: Tim Adams; Doug Beck; Mark Best; Richard Carpenter; Tom Freer; Andy Kubiszewski; Trent Reznor; Nick Rushe; Rodney Shields; Marty Step; Frank Vale; Chris Vrenna

The Exotic Birds was an American Synthpop music group formed in Cleveland, Ohio, United States, in 1982 by three Cleveland Institute of Music percussion students (Andy Kubiszewski, Tom Freer and Timothy Adams Jr.). The three wrote their own music and have been described as synthpop and dance. They achieved local success, appearing as an opening band for Culture Club, Eurythmics, and Information Society.

== History ==
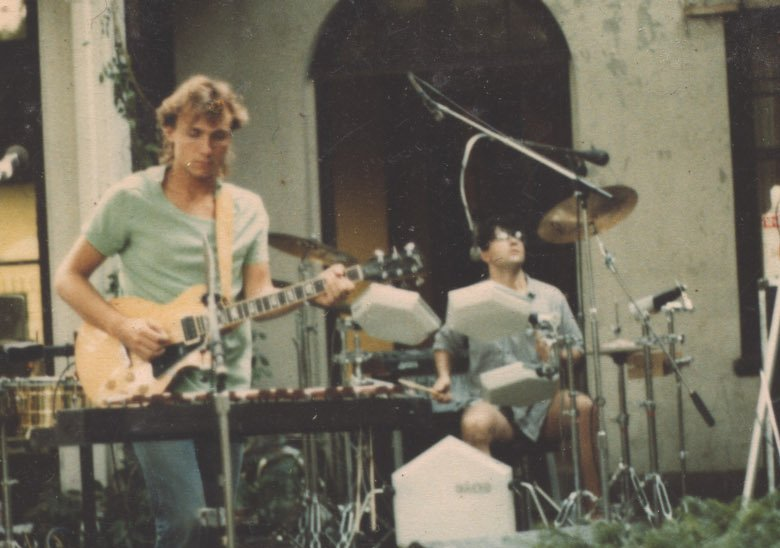
Kubiszewski and Freer in 1984

The band's first single, "Dance the Night Away", was backed with an earlier recording, "Who Knows Why", by Kubiszewski and Nick Capetanakis (who performed with Kubiszewski in a prior group). The order of the songs was accidentally flipped on the record, so the older song appeared as the A side. "Who Knows Why" received moderate local radio play and became a surprise hit in Japan. Frank Vale joined the band as an additional keyboardist in September 1984. When Adams decided to leave to work with orchestras, the Exotic Birds broke up for the first time, playing a farewell show at the Phantasy Nite Club on February 16, 1985. In early 1986, Exotic Birds reformed as a five-piece band, with Kubiszewski, Freer, and Vale being joined by Mark Best on bass and Trent Reznor on keyboards, programming, and backing vocals. In November 1986, Freer and Best moved on, with Vale having departed slightly earlier. In December 1986, Reznor invited Chris Vrenna to play drums for the band, filling out the now-trio. However, by July 1987, the band had broken up again.

Kubiszewski reformed Exotic Birds in early 1988 with a new line-up including Doug Beck on keyboards and Richard Carpenter on drums, and they released the group's first CD Equilibrium in November 1989. In 1990, Beck left, and Nick Rushe (formerly of Nine Inch Nails) joined on keyboards. The band signed to Alpha International Records out of Philadelphia, PA, for what was to be their next album. Instead, Alpha repackaged Equilibrium, cutting several tracks, and adding the new song "Imagination" to lead off the disc. Alpha was bought out just days after "Imagination" was released as a single. After Rushe departed, Rodney Shields (keyboards) and Marty Step (guitar) joined, rounding out the final Exotic Birds' line-up. In 1993, Kubiszewski left to play drums with The The, but returned for one final gig on January 22, 1994.

Reznor, Vale and non-Exotic Birds member Mark Addison were the fictional band "The Problems" in Paul Schrader's 1987 Cleveland set movie Light of Day featuring Michael J. Fox and Joan Jett.

One-time Exotic Birds manager John Malm was Reznor's long-time manager and co-founder of Nothing Records.

To this day, Freer, now with the Cleveland Orchestra, and Adams, formerly with the Pittsburgh Symphony Orchestra, remain close friends and often teach together.

== Discography ==
=== "Who Knows Why" / "Dance the Night Away" 7" (1983) ===
1. "Who Knows Why" (A. Kubiszewski/N. Capetanakis) [3:27]
2. "Dance the Night Away" [3:59]

=== Exotic Birds (1984) ===
1. "I'll Never Say Goodbye" (A. Kubiszewski) [3:52]
2. "Waiting For You (Na Na)" (A. Kubiszewski) [5:40]
3. "No Communication" (A. Kubiszewski) [3:38]
4. "Fade Away" (A. Kubiszewski) [5:40]
5. "Take Your Chances" (A. Kubiszewski) [5:03]
6. "Demon Dance" (T. Adams) [5:30]
7. "No Communication (TV Version)" (A. Kubiszewski) [3:53]

=== L'oiseau (1986) ===
1. "Dancing on the Airwaves" (A. Kubiszewski) [3:40]
2. "Have You Heard the News" (A. Kubiszewski) [3:42]
3. "The Meaning of Love" (T. Freer/A. Kubiszewski) [2:37]
4. "This Must Be Heaven" (A. Kubiszewski) [4:53]
5. "Nothing Lasts Forever" (T. Freer) [3:54]
6. "Fighting Fire With Fire" (A. Kubiszewski) [4:58]

Backing Vocals by Rebecca Harper.

=== Equilibrium (Pleasureland) (1989) ===
1. "Everything Is Different Now" [4:16]
2. "Day After Day" [3:12] ++
3. "The Rhythm of Machinery" [3:42]
4. "Fashion and Luxury" [4:11]
5. "Heartbeat Like A Drum" [4:31]
6. "This Feeling" [3:35]
7. "The Touch" [3:33]
8. "Dance With Me" [4:33]
9. "Pleasure" [3:39]+
10. "Every Star Was You" [4:40]
11. "Day After Day" (Remix) [4:47]
12. "Heartbeat Like A Drum" (The E-Z Listening Mix) [7:04]
13. "Dance With Me" (Disco Invader Mix) [6:34]
14. "Pleasure" (Dreamworld Mix) [5:35]
15. "Every Star Was You" (Celestial Mix) [6:03]

All songs written by A. Kubiszewski except +by Doug Beck, and ++by Pete Ham.

=== Equilibrium (Alpha International) (1990) ===
1. "Imagination" [4:20] (Andy Kubiszewski/Richard Carpenter)
2. "Day After Day" [3:12] (Pete Ham)
3. "Everything Is Different Now" [4:10]
4. "Heartbeat Like A Drum" [4:16]
5. "Every Star Was You" [4:35]
6. "Fashion and Luxury" [4:11]
7. "The Touch" [3:33]
8. "This Feeling" [3:34]
9. "Rhythm of Machinery" [3:44]
10. "Dance With Me" [4:36]

All songs written by Andy Kubiszewski except as indicated.

=== Unreleased songs ===
- Cruel Heart
- Devices and Desires
- Don't Breathe a Word
- God
- Haunting Me
- I Will Die For You
- Join Hands
- Never Enough
- Never For You
- Set Me Free
- Sometimes It Hurts
- Temptation's Deep Blue Eyes
- What Do I Have to Do?
- Who Knows What Love Is
