= Darkest Days =

Studio album by Stabbing Westward
- Released: April 7, 1998
- Recorded: 1997
- Studios: Eldorado Studios and NRG Recording Studios, North Hollywood, California
- Genre: Industrial metal
- Length: 64:23
- Label: Columbia
- Producers: Stabbing Westward, Dave Jerden, Ulrich Wild

Stabbing Westward chronology
Wither Blister Burn & Peel (1996)	Darkest Days (1998)	Stabbing Westward (2001)

Singles from Darkest Days
- 1. "Save Yourself" Released: May 1998; 2. "Sometimes It Hurts" Released: 1998; 3. "Haunting Me" Released: 1999

Professional ratings
Review scores
Source	Rating
AllMusic	4.5/5 stars
Pitchfork	6.5/10
Rolling Stone	3/5 stars
Sputnikmusic	4/5

Darkest Days is the third album released by industrial rock band Stabbing Westward on Columbia Records. The album was recorded in L.A. in 1997 and released on April 7, 1998. Although the album didn't achieve the same level of success as Wither Blister Burn & Peel, it received positive reviews and is often considered the band's best album. The band was dropped from Columbia Records in 2000 following this release. The track "Save Yourself" reached number 4 on the U.S. Mainstream Rock chart (the band's highest-placing single on that chart) and number 20 on the U.S. Modern Rock chart and remains a staple of alternative music. Darkest Days was certified gold on March 1, 2000.

Darkest Days is a concept album consisting of four acts, with each portraying a different emotional phase gone through after a break-up. The first act (tracks 1–4) is about sabotaging the relationship. The second act (tracks 5–9) is about lust, hope, and longing. The third act (tracks 10–12) is about hitting rock bottom after it is all over. The fourth act (tracks 13–16) is about recovery and self-respect.

== Track listing ==
All tracks are written by Stabbing Westward.

No.	Title	Length
1.	"Darkest Days"	3:51
2.	"Everything I Touch"	3:23
3.	"How Can I Hold On"	4:29
4.	"Drugstore"	4:59
5.	"You Complete Me"	4:06
6.	"Save Yourself"	4:13
7.	"Haunting Me"	3:37
8.	"Torn Apart"	3:24
9.	"Sometimes It Hurts"	3:39
10.	"Drowning"	3:28
11.	"Desperate Now"	5:25
12.	"Goodbye"	1:56
13.	"When I'm Dead"	3:04
14.	"The Thing I Hate"	3:37
15.	"On Your Way Down"	4:40
16.	"Waking Up Beside You"	6:34
Total length:		64:23

Japanese edition bonus track
No.	Title	Length
17.	"Hopeless"	4:02
Total length:		68:25

== Appearances ==
- "The Thing I Hate" was featured in the commercial and introduction sequence of the 1998 PlayStation video game Duke Nukem: Time to Kill. It was later included on the Duke Nukem: Music to Score By soundtrack in 1999. Noah Antwiler of The Spoony Experiment used the song as his outro piece for the final segment of his review of the 1999 PC game Ultima IX: Ascension in 2013.
- "Haunting Me" appeared in the 1998 science fiction horror film The Faculty.
- "Save Yourself" was featured in the trailer of the 1999 film The Mod Squad and the trailer of the 2006 film The Covenant, along with an appearance on the soundtracks to Tekken: The Motion Picture, Urban Legend and in the 2008 video game Shaun White Snowboarding. In the HBO series True Blood, "Save Yourself" played during the end credits to the season 5 finale of the same name in 2012.
- A remix of "Waking Up Beside You" was used in the 2000 film The Crow: Salvation and was also included on the film's soundtrack release.

== Personnel ==
- Stabbing Westward
  - Christopher Hall – lead vocals, guitar
  - Marcus Eliopulos – guitar, backing vocals
  - Walter Flakus – keyboards, backing vocals
  - Jim Sellers – bass
  - Andrew Kubiszewski – drums, keyboards, guitar
- Dave Jerden – producer
- Ulrich Wild – producer, engineer
- Bryan Carlstrom – engineer
- Annette Cisneros – assistant engineer
- Steve Mixdorf – assistant engineer
- Steve Durkee – assistant engineer
- Milton Chan – assistant engineer
- Tom Baker – mastering
- Dave McKean – cover design and illustrations
- Dean Karr – band photography

== Charts ==
Chart performance for Darkest Days
Chart (1998)	Peak position
Australian Albums (ARIA)	79
US Billboard 200	52
