= Class of '99 =

American alternative rock supergroup (1998)

- Origin: Seattle, Washington, U.S.
- Genres: Alternative rock, industrial rock, grunge
- Years active: 1998
- Label: Sony
- Spinoff of: Alice in Chains, Jane's Addiction, Rage Against the Machine, Porno for Pyros, Collective Soul
- Past members: Layne Staley; Tom Morello; Stephen Perkins; Martyn LeNoble; Matt Serletic

Class of '99 was an American music group contracted in 1998. It consisted of members from several notable rock bands:

- Layne Staley of Alice in Chains as vocalist
- Tom Morello of Rage Against the Machine as lead guitarist
- Stephen Perkins of Jane's Addiction as drummer
- Martyn LeNoble of Porno for Pyros as bassist
- Matt Serletic of Collective Soul as keyboardist

These five musicians collaborated to cover Pink Floyd's "Another Brick in the Wall (Part 2)" (and later, "Another Brick in the Wall (Part 1)") for the soundtrack to Robert Rodriguez's 1998 science-fiction horror film, The Faculty. Contrary to rumors and popular belief, the five musicians collaborated solely to cover the songs for the film and did not create a band or supergroup or intend on releasing other new material.

In 1999, a single of both versions was released on the Sony International record label. It also contained Stabbing Westward's "Haunting Me". The "Another Brick in the Wall (Part 2)" video was directed by Jim Shea, and aired for the first time in January 1999.

As the recordings took place in November 1998, Class of '99 is now notable for being Staley's final studio appearance prior to his death by drug overdose in April 2002.

== Single chart positions ==
| Year | Song | US Mainstream Rock | US Modern Rock | Album |
|---|---|---|---|---|
| 1999 | "Another Brick in the Wall (Part 2)" | 18 | 34 | The Faculty: Music from the Dimension Motion Picture |
