= Save Yourself (Stabbing Westward song) =

Single by Stabbing Westward

from the album Darkest Days
- Released: 1998
- Recorded: 1997 at Eldorado Studios and NRG Recording Studios, North Hollywood
- Genre: Industrial rock; alternative rock
- Length: 4:13 (album version); 3:50 (edit)
- Label: Columbia
- Songwriters: Mark Eliopulos; Walter Flakus; Christopher Hall; Andy Kubiszewski; Jim Sellers
- Producers: Stabbing Westward; Dave Jerden; Ulrich Wild

Stabbing Westward singles chronology
"Sometimes It Hurts" (1998)	"Save Yourself" (1998)	"Haunting Me" (1999)

"Save Yourself" is a song by American industrial rock band Stabbing Westward. The song was released as the second single from the band's 1998 album Darkest Days. The track peaked at number 4 on the Billboard Mainstream Rock Tracks.

== Background ==
In a 2020 interview with Songfacts, lead singer Christopher Hall said:

We had a song on our record called "Sleep," which was a song about a girl who had been molested, and what she did to try and deal with it on a nightly basis. That song touched a lot of people that had similar experiences. They all reached out to me at shows, in letters, and in email, which was just starting to become a thing back then. They all had these tragic stories.

I just felt like everyone was looking to me for some sort of answer, because not only did we have "Sleep," but we had songs about mental illness and depression and dealing with hard times and loss and things like that, and everyone thought that since I had written these songs that I had found the answer. I hadn't. That's what "Save Yourself" is about. I know nothing. I'm right there with you, feeling the same things you're feeling. You have to figure it out for yourself.

At the time, it felt like a selfish song, like, "I can't help you, sorry." But I was trying to help them by saying only you can help yourself.

== Music video ==
The song's music video shows the band performing the song in a rundown house inhabited by strange people.

== Track listing ==
Promo single

No.	Title	Length
1.	"Save Yourself" (radio edit)	3:50
2.	"Save Yourself" (LP version)	4:13
Total length:		8:03

EP single

No.	Title	Length
1.	"Save Yourself" (radio edit)	3:50
2.	"Save This" (remix)	6:35
3.	"P.O.M.F. Dispossessed" ("The Thing I Hate" remix)	6:24
4.	"On Your Way Down" (Down and Out Remix)	6:08
Total length:		22:47

== Appearances in other media ==
- The song was featured in the trailers for the films The Mod Squad and Fatal Error in 1999, and The Covenant in 2006.
- The song was featured on the soundtracks for Tekken: The Motion Picture in 1998 and Shaun White Snowboarding in 2008.
- The song played during the end credits to the True Blood Season 5 finale of the same name.
- The song was featured in the 1998 film Urban Legend.
- The song was also featured in the 1998 Daria episode, "Ill."

== Chart positions ==
Chart (1998)	Peak positions
Australia (ARIA)	64
US Active Rock (Billboard)	1
US Heritage Rock (Billboard)	35
US Modern Rock Tracks (Billboard)	20
US Mainstream Rock Tracks (Billboard)	4

== Personnel ==
- Christopher Hall – vocals, guitar
- Marcus Eliopulos – guitar
- Jim Sellers – bass
- Walter Flakus – keyboards
- Andy Kubiszewski – drums
