= Be Here Now (album) =

1997 studio album by Oasis

Studio album by Oasis
- Released: 21 August 1997
- Recorded: 7 October 1996 – 12 March 1997
- Studios: Abbey Road, AIR, Orinoco and Master Rock in London; Ridge Farm, Surrey
- Genre: Britpop
- Length: 71:31
- Label: Creation
- Producers: Owen Morris; Noel Gallagher

Oasis chronology
(What's the Story) Morning Glory? (1995)	Be Here Now (1997)	The Masterplan (1998)

Singles from Be Here Now
- 1. "D'You Know What I Mean?" Released: 7 July 1997; 2. "Stand by Me" Released: 22 September 1997; 3. "All Around the World" Released: 12 January 1998; 4. "Don't Go Away" Released: 13 May 1998 (Japan only)

Be Here Now is the third studio album by the English rock band Oasis, released on 21 August 1997 by Creation Records. The album was recorded at multiple recording studios in London, including Abbey Road Studios, as well as Ridge Farm Studio in Surrey. Although most tracks retain the anthemic quality of previous releases, the songs on Be Here Now are longer and contain many guitar overdubs. Noel Gallagher said this was done to make the album sound as "colossal" as possible. The album cover features a shot of the band members at Stocks House in Hertfordshire. It is the last Oasis studio album to feature founding members guitarist Paul "Bonehead" Arthurs and bassist Paul "Guigsy" McGuigan as the two left in 1999, and the first to entirely feature Alan "Whitey" White on drums, having joined the band two years prior.

Following the worldwide success of their first two albums, Definitely Maybe (1994) and (What's the Story) Morning Glory? (1995), the album was highly anticipated. Oasis' management company, Ignition, were aware of the dangers of overexposure and, before release, sought to control media access to the album. The campaign included limiting pre-release radio airplay and forcing journalists to sign gag orders. The tactics alienated the press and many industry personnel connected with the band and fuelled large-scale speculation and publicity within the British music scene.

Upon release, Be Here Now was an instant commercial success, becoming the fastest-selling album in British chart history and topping the album charts in 15 countries. It was the biggest-selling album of 1997 in the UK, with 1.47 million units sold that year. As of 2022, the album has sold eight million copies worldwide. It has been certified 7× Platinum in the UK and Platinum in the US, being Oasis' third and final Platinum album in the latter country. It was supported by four singles, two of which – "D'You Know What I Mean?" and "All Around the World" – topped the UK singles chart.

According to co-producer Owen Morris, the recording sessions were marred by arguments and drug abuse, and the band's only motivations were commercial. While initial reception for Be Here Now was positive, retrospective reviews have been more negative, with many calling it bloated and over-produced. The band members have had differing views of the album: Noel has severely criticised it, while Liam Gallagher has praised it, calling the album his favourite Oasis album. Music journalists such as Jon Savage and Miranda Sawyer have pinpointed the album's release as marking the end of the Britpop movement. In 2016, the album was reissued with bonus tracks, including a new remix of "D'You Know What I Mean?"

== Background ==
By the summer of 1996, Oasis were widely considered, according to guitarist Noel Gallagher, "the biggest band in the world ... bigger than, dare I say it, fucking God." The commercial success of their previous two albums had resulted in media frenzy in danger of leading to a backlash.

Earlier that year, Oasis members holidayed with Johnny Depp and Kate Moss in Mick Jagger's villa in Mustique. During their last stay on the island, Noel wrote the majority of the songs that would make up Be Here Now. He had suffered from writer's block during the previous winter, and said he wrote only a single guitar riff in the six months following the release of (What's the Story) Morning Glory?. Eventually, he disciplined himself to a routine of songwriting where he would go "into this room in the morning, come out for lunch, go back in, come out for dinner, go back in, then go to bed." Noel said "most of the songs were written before I even got a record deal, I went away and wrote the lyrics in about two weeks." Oasis producer Owen Morris joined Gallagher later with a TASCAM 8-track recorder, and they recorded demos with a drum machine and a keyboard.

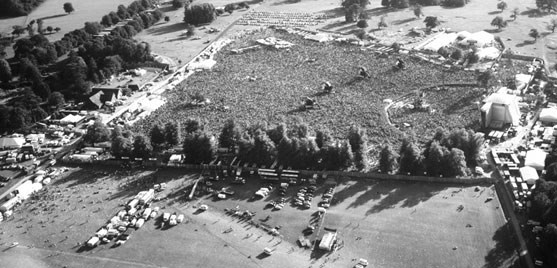
Oasis performing at Knebworth in 1996, where they played to crowds of over 250,000 people.

In August 1996, Oasis performed two concerts before crowds of 250,000 at Knebworth House, Hertfordshire; more than 2,500,000 fans had applied for tickets. The dates were to be the zenith of Oasis's popularity, and both the music press and the band realised it would not be possible for the band to equal the event. By this time, infighting had broken out in the band. On 23 August 1996, vocalist Liam Gallagher refused to sing for an MTV Unplugged performance at London's Royal Festival Hall, pleading a sore throat. He attended the concert and heckled Noel from the upper balcony. Four days later, Liam declined to participate in the first leg of an American tour, complaining that he needed to buy a house with his then-girlfriend Patsy Kensit. He rejoined the band a few days after for a key concert at the MTV Video Music Awards in New York, but intentionally sang off-key and spat beer and saliva during the performance.

Amongst much internal bickering, the tour continued to Charlotte, North Carolina, where Noel finally lost his patience with Liam and announced he was leaving the band. He said later: "If the truth be known, I didn't want to be there anyway. I wasn't prepared to be in the band if people were being like that to each other." Noel rejoined Oasis a few weeks later, but the band's management and handlers were worried. With an album's worth of songs already demoed, the Gallaghers felt that they should record as soon as possible. Their manager, Marcus Russell, said in 2007 that "in retrospect, we went in the studio too quickly. The smart move would have been to take the rest of the year off. But at the time it seemed like the right thing to do. If you're a band and you've got a dozen songs you think are great, why not go and do it."

I have to say that I cocked up, and I think Noel did too, in not using and referencing the demos more on the actual album sessions. ... Be Here Now would have been a far better record had we been able to use Noel's guitars and bass and percussion from the Mustique demos. We could've just overdubbed the drums and Liam's singing, and Bonehead's guitar and that would have been a great album. So I very sadly admit that I mucked up royally there.

— Owen Morris, discussing the Mustique demos

In 2006, Noel agreed that the band should have separated for a year or two instead of going into the studio. However, Morris later wrote: "It was a mistake on everyone's part, management very much included, that we didn't record Be Here Now in the summer of 1996. It would have been a much different album: happy probably." He described the Mustique demos as "the last good recordings I did with Noel", and said his relationship soured following the Knebworth concert.

== Recording and production ==
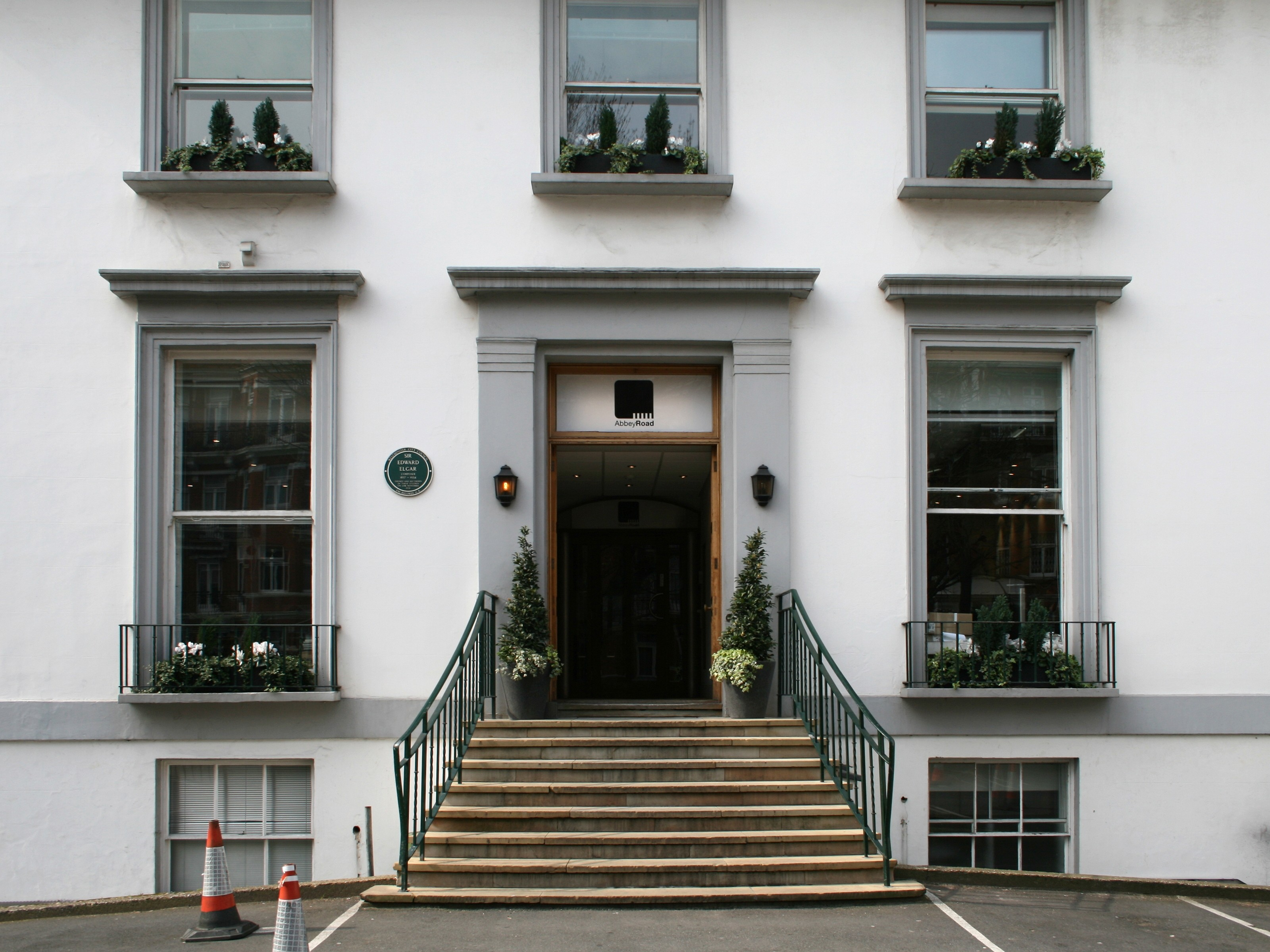
Part of Be Here Now was recorded at Abbey Road Studios.

Recording began on 7 October 1996 at EMI's Abbey Road Studios in London. Morris described the first week as "fucking awful", and suggested to Noel that they abandon the session: "He just shrugged and said it would be all right. So on we went." Liam was under heavy tabloid focus at the time, and on 9 November 1996 was arrested and cautioned for cocaine possession at the Q Awards. A media frenzy ensued, and the band's management made the decision to move to a studio less readily accessible to paparazzi. Sun showbiz editor Dominic Mohan recalled: "We had quite a few Oasis contacts on the payroll. I don't know whether any were drug dealers, but there was always a few dodgy characters about."

Oasis's official photographer Jill Furmanovsky felt the media's focus, and was preyed upon by tabloid journalists living in the flat upstairs from her: "They thought I had the band hiding in my flat." In paranoia, Oasis cut themselves off from their wider circle. According to Johnny Hopkins, the publicist of Oasis's label Creation Records, "People were being edged out of the circle around Oasis. People who knew them before they were famous rather than because they were famous." Hopkins likened the situation to a medieval court, complete with kings, courtiers and jesters, and said: "Once you're in that situation you lose sight of reality."

On 11 November 1996, Oasis relocated to the rural Ridge Farm Studio in Surrey. Though they reconvened with more energy, the early recordings were compromised by the drug intake of all involved. Morris recalled that "in the first week, someone tried to score an ounce of weed, but instead got an ounce of cocaine. Which kind of summed it up." Noel was not present during any of Liam's vocal track recordings. Morris thought that the new material was weak, but when he voiced his opinion to Noel, he was cut down: "[So] I just carried on shovelling drugs up my nose." Morris had initially wanted to transfer the Mustique demo recordings and overdub drums, vocals and rhythm guitar, but the 8-track mixer he had employed required him to bounce tracks for overdubs, leaving him unable to remove the drum machine from the recordings.

Noel, wanting to make the album as dense and "colossal" feeling as possible, layered multiple guitar tracks on several songs. In many instances, he dubbed ten channels with identical guitar parts, in an effort to create a sonic volume. Creation's owner Alan McGee visited the studio during the mixing stage; he said, "I used to go down to the studio, and there was so much cocaine getting done at that point ... Owen was out of control, and he was the one in charge of it. The music was just fucking loud." Morris responded: "Alan McGee was the head of the record company. Why didn't he do something about the 'out of control' record producer? Obviously, the one not in control was the head of the record company." He said that he and the band had been dealing with personal difficulties the day and night before McGee visited the studio.

== Songs ==
As with Oasis' previous two albums, the songs on Be Here Now are generally anthemic. The structures are traditional, and largely follow the typical verse – chorus – verse – chorus – middle eight – chorus format of guitar-based rock music. Reviewing for Nude as the News, Jonathan Cohen noted that the album is "virtually interchangeable with 1994's Definitely Maybe or its blockbuster sequel, (What's the Story) Morning Glory?", while Noel had previously remarked that he would make three albums in this generic style. Yet the songs on Be Here Now differ in that they are longer than previous releases; an extended coda brings "D'You Know What I Mean?" to almost eight minutes, while "All Around the World" contains three key changes and lasts for a full nine minutes. When "D'You Know What I Mean?" was released as the album's first single, Noel Gallagher expected to be asked to reduce the length of the song by two minutes. However, nobody had the courage.

The tracks are more layered and intricate than before, and each contains multiple guitar overdubs. While Morris had previously stripped away layers of overdubs on the band's debut Definitely Maybe, during the production of Be Here Now he "seemed to gleefully encourage" such excess; "My Big Mouth" has an estimated thirty tracks of guitar overdubbed onto the song. A Rolling Stone review described the guitar lines as composed of "elementary riffs".

There was some experimentation: "D'You Know What I Mean?" contains a slowed down loop from N.W.A's "Straight Outta Compton", (Note: The original sample was the Amen break from "Amen, Brother" by the Winstons, which N.W.A used for "Straight Outta Compton".) while "Magic Pie" features psychedelically arranged vocal harmonies and a Mellotron. According to Noel, "All I did was run my elbows across the keys and this mad jazz came out and everyone laughed." The album's production is dominated by top-end high frequency tones, and according to Uncut's Paul Lester, its use of treble is reminiscent of both late 1980s Creation Records bands such as My Bloody Valentine, and the Stooges' famously under-produced Raw Power (1973).

The vocal melodies continue Noel's preference for "massed-rank sing-alongs", although Paul Du Noyer concedes that not all are of the "pub-trashing idiot kind" of previous releases. At the time of release, Q's Phil Sutcliffe summarised the lyrics of Be Here Now as a mixture of "hookline optimism, a swarm of Beatles and other '60s references, a gruff love song to Meg, and further tangled expressions of his inability/unwillingness to express profound emotions." David Fricke found the numerous Beatles references, including the line "The Fool on the Hill and I Feel Fine" from "D'You Know What I Mean?" and "Sing a song for me, one from Let It Be" on the title track as lazy songwriting from Noel. Reviewers have also found Beatles references in the music, on tracks such as "All Around the World", which has been compared to the sing-along qualities of "Hey Jude" and "All You Need Is Love".

The lyrics were elsewhere described as "[running] the gamut from insightful to insipid", although Du Noyer admitted that Noel is "[to go by his lyrics] something of a closet philosopher ... and often romantic to the point of big girl's blousedom." While the tracks "Don't Go Away" and "The Girl in the Dirty Shirt" were described as unabashedly sentimental, Du Noyer went on to observe that "there is compassion and sensitivity in these tracks that is not the work of oafs." Du Noyer conceded that Noel often tied himself up in "cosmic knots", but had "written words that sound simple and true, and are therefore poetic without trying to be." Lester read song titles such as "Stand by Me" and "Don't Go Away" as a series of demands, both to members of his private life and his public audience.

Du Noyer praised Liam's vocal contributions and described his "Northern punk whine" as "the most distinctive individual style of our time." Lester alluded to Liam as Noel's "mouthpiece", although he qualified that Liam is the "voice of every working-class boy with half a yen to break out and make it big."

== Album cover ==
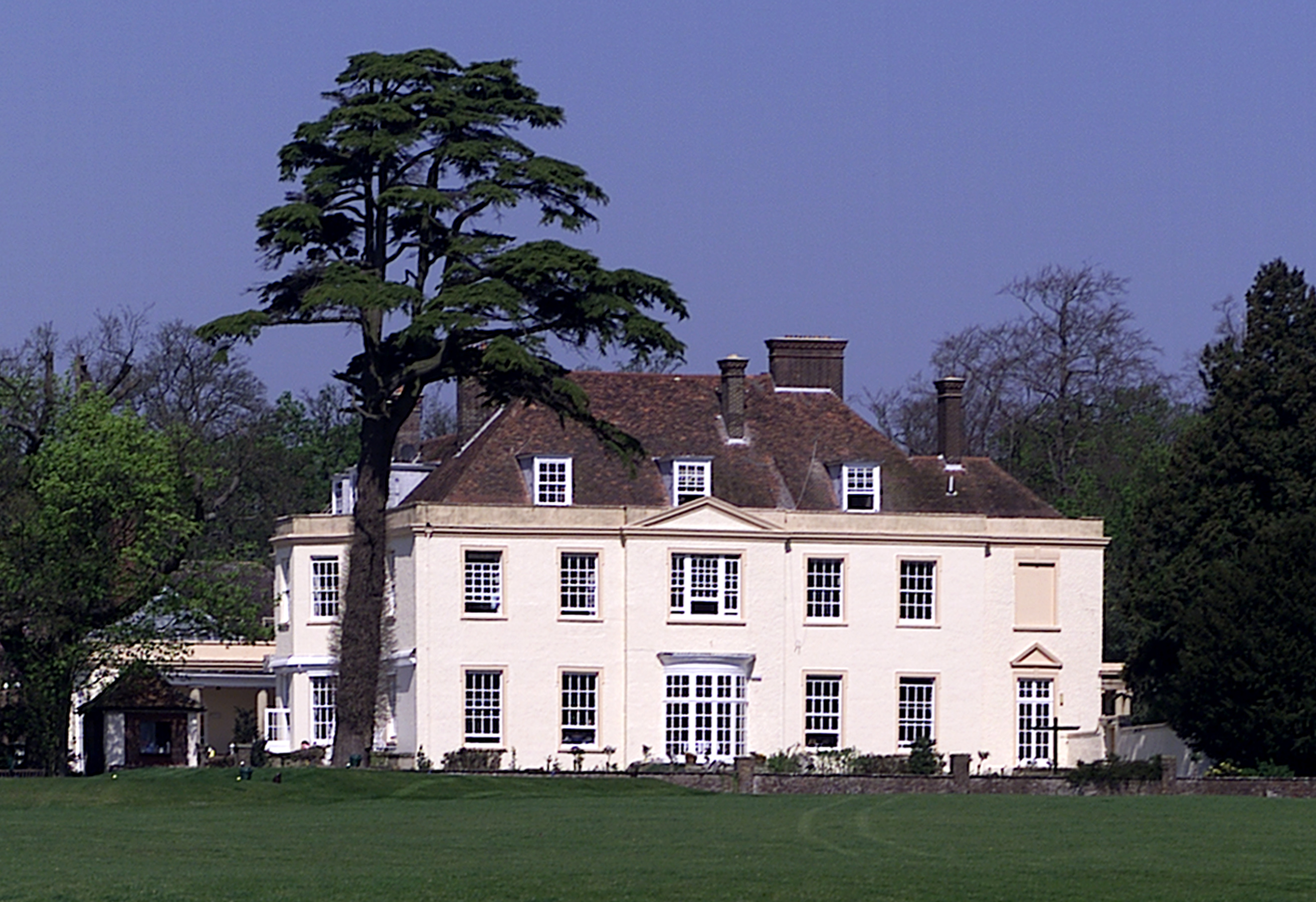
Stocks House, the 18th-century mansion used as the location for the cover photo

The cover image was shot in April 1997 at Stocks House in Hertfordshire, the former home of Victor Lownes, head of the Playboy Clubs in the UK until 1981. It shows the band standing by the swimming pool outside the hotel, surrounded by various props. For the photo shoot, a white 1972 Rolls-Royce Silver Shadow was lowered into the swimming pool and half submerged in the water.

Photographer Michael Spencer Jones said the original concept involved shooting each band member in various locations around the world, but when the cost proved prohibitive, the shoot was relocated to Stocks House. Spencer remarked that the shoot "degenerated into chaos", adding that "by 8 pm, everyone was in the bar, there were schoolkids all over the set, and the lighting crew couldn't start the generator. It was Alice in Wonderland meets Apocalypse Now." Critics have tried to read into the selection of the cover props, but Johns said Gallagher simply selected items from the BBC props store he thought would look good in the picture. Two props considered were an inflatable globe (intended as a homage to the sleeve of Definitely Maybe) and the Rolls-Royce, suggested by Arthurs.

Jones has said that the partially submerged Rolls-Royce was in reference to Keith Moon's oft-fabled sinking of a Lincoln Continental into a hotel swimming pool in 1967. The release date in each region was commemorated on the calendar pictured on the sleeve; Harris said the dating "[encouraged] fans to believe that to buy a copy on the day it appeared was to participate in some kind of historical event." The album cover also spurred controversy from a legal viewpoint. In the case of Creation Records Ltd v. News Group Newspapers Ltd, the court decided that the collection of objects brought together for the album cover was insufficient in creating an artwork that could be protected by copyright.

== Release ==
=== Promotion ===
When Alan McGee, Creation's publicist Johnny Hopkins, and marketing executive Emma Greengrass first heard Be Here Now at Noel Gallagher's house, each had their doubts about its artistic value, but kept their doubts to themselves. One Creation employee recalled "a lot of nodding of heads, a lot of slapping of backs." McGee later admitted to having strong misgivings at first: "I heard it in the studio and I remember saying 'We'll only sell seven million copies' ... I thought it was too confrontational." However, in an interview with the music press a few days later he predicted the album would sell twenty million copies. McGee's hyperbole alarmed both Oasis and their management company Ignition, and both immediately excluded him from involvement in the release campaign. Ignition's strategy from that point on centred on an effort to suppress all publicity, and withheld access to both music and information from anybody not directly involved with the album's release. Fearful of the dangers of over-hype and bootlegging, their aim was to present the record as a "regular, everyday collection of tunes." To this end they planned a modest marketing budget, to be spent on subdued promotional activities such as street posters and music press adverts, while avoiding mainstream instruments such as billboard and TV advertising. According to Greengrass "We want to keep it low key. We want to keep control of the whole mad thing."

However, the extent that Ignition were willing to go to control access to the album generated more hype than could normally have been expected, and served to alienate members of both the print and broadcast media, as well as most Creation staff members. When "D'You Know What I Mean?" was planned as the first single, Ignition decided on a late release to radio so as to avoid too much advance exposure. However, three stations broke the embargo, and Ignition panicked. According to Greengrass: "we'd been in these bloody bunker meetings for six months or something, and our plot was blown. 'Shit, it's a nightmare'." BBC Radio 1 received a CD containing three songs ten days before the album's release, on condition that disc jockey Steve Lamacq talked over the tracks to prevent illegal copies being made by listeners. The day after Lamacq previewed the album on his show, he received a phone call from Ignition informing him that he would not be able to preview further tracks because he didn't speak enough over the songs. Lamacq said, "I had to go on the air the next night and say, 'Sorry, but we're not getting any more tracks.' It was just absurd." According to Creation's head of marketing John Andrews, "[The campaign] made people despise Oasis within Creation. You had this Oasis camp that was like 'I'm sorry, you're not allowed come into the office between the following hours. You're not allowed mention the word Oasis.' It was like a fascist state." One employee recalled an incident "when somebody came round to check our phones because they thought The Sun had tapped them."

When Hopkins began to circulate cassette copies of the album to the music press a few weeks later, he required that each journalist sign a contract containing a clause requiring that the cassette recipient, according to Select journalist Mark Perry, "not discuss the album with anyone—including your partner at home. It basically said don't talk to your girlfriend about it when you're at home in bed." Reflecting in 1999, Greengrass admitted: "In retrospect a lot of the things we did were ridiculous. We sit in [Oasis] meetings today and we're like 'It's on the Internet. It's in Camden Market. Whatever'. I think we've learned our lesson." According to Perry: "It seemed, particularly once you heard the album, that this was cocaine grandeur of just the most ludicrous degree. I remember listening to "All Around the World" and laughing—actually quite pleasurably—because it seemed so ridiculous. You just thought: Christ, there is so much coke being done here."

=== Commercial performance ===
Be Here Now was released in the UK on 21 August 1997. The release date had been brought forward out of Ignition's fear that import copies of the album from the United States would arrive in Britain before the street date. Worrying that TV news cameras would interview queuing fans at a traditional midnight opening session, Ignition forced retailers to sign contracts pledging not to sell the record earlier than 8:00 am. However, the cameras arrived regardless, just in time to record the initially slow trade. It was not until lunch time that sales picked up. By the end of the first day of release, Be Here Now sold over 424,000 units and by the end of business on Saturday that week sales had reached 663,389, making it based on first seven days sales, the fastest-selling album in British history. The album became their highest-charting release in the US by debuting at number two on the Billboard 200 chart. However, its first week sales of 152,000—below expected sales of 400,000 copies—were considered a disappointment. It missed the top of the chart by sales of only 771 copies.

Be Here Now was the biggest-selling album of 1997 in the UK, with 1.47 million units sold that year. By the end of 1997, Be Here Now had sold eight million units worldwide. However, most sales occurred during the first two weeks of release, and once the album was released to UK radio stations, the turnover tapered off. Buyers realised that the album was not another (What's the Story) Morning Glory?, and by 1999, Melody Maker reported that it was the album most sold to second-hand record stores. It has been certified 7× Platinum in the UK and Platinum in the US, being Oasis' third and final Platinum album in the country. As of 2022, the album had sold over eight million copies worldwide. (Note: 2016 numbers: 2022 update:) In 2016, following the album's reissue and the release of the documentary Oasis: Supersonic, the album topped the UK Vinyl Albums Chart, 19 years after its original release.

=== Singles ===
Four of the album's 12 tracks were released as singles: "D'You Know What I Mean?", "Stand By Me", "All Around the World" and "Don't Go Away". The first, "D'You Know What I Mean?", was released on 7 July 1997, with the non-album tracks "Stay Young", "Angel Child" and a cover of David Bowie's "'Heroes'" as the B-sides. Bolstered by the media circus surrounding Oasis at the time, "D'You Know What I Mean?" reached number one on the UK singles chart and sold 370,000 copies in its first week. It went on to be the fifth best-selling single of 1997, with sales of 745,000 copies as of 2016. The second single, "Stand by Me", released on 22 September, charted at number two, held off the top spot by Elton John's "Candle in the Wind 1997". Nevertheless, it sold 600,000 copies and was certified gold within a month. Its B-sides were the non-album tracks "(I Got) The Fever", "My Sister Lover" and "Going Nowhere". The third single, "All Around the World", was released on 12 January 1998, with "The Fame", "Flashbax" and a cover of the Rolling Stones' "Street Fighting Man" (1968) as the B-sides. It topped the UK singles chart and, at nearly ten minutes in length, became the longest song to both chart at number one and achieve a Gold certification. "Don't Go Away" was released as a commercial single in Japan only on 13 May 1998.

== Critical reception ==
=== Initial response ===
Professional ratings
Original release
Review scores
Source	Rating
AllMusic	4/5 stars
Chicago Sun-Times	4/4 stars
Entertainment Weekly	B
Los Angeles Times	3.5/4 stars
NME	8/10
Pitchfork	7.9/10
Q	5/5 stars
Rolling Stone	4/5 stars
Select	5/5 stars
Spin	6/10

Initial reviews of Be Here Now were, in John Harris's words, unanimous with "truly amazing praise". According to Harris, "To find an album that had attracted gushing notices in such profusion, one had to go back thirty years, to the release of Sgt. Pepper's Lonely Hearts Club Band." While Q described the album as "cocaine set to music", most early reviews praised the record's length, volume and ambition, including Charles Shaar Murray, who called it the "Oasis World Domination Album" in Mojo. David Fricke of Rolling Stone complimented the song formula throughout the album, writing that it "pays off". However, as a whole, he felt the album was "music built for impact, not explanation". Dele Fadele of Vox describes it as "a veritable rock'n'roll monsoon of an album; a giant jigsaw puzzle, an elemental force, a monster that cannot and will not be contained."

Reviews in the British music press for (What's the Story) Morning Glory? had been generally negative. When it went on to become, in the words of Select editor Alexis Petridis, "this huge kind of zeitgeist-defining record", the music press was "baffled". Petridis believed the initial glowing reviews of Be Here Now were a concession to public opinion. In America, reviews were equally positive. Reviewing for the Chicago Sun-Times on release, Jae-Ha Kim considered the album as good as its two predecessors, writing: "The 12 tracks on Be Here Now aren't as immediately accessible as Oasis' earlier hits "Wonderwall" or "Live Forever". But the pop songs are mesmerising in their intense delivery and clean execution." Elysa Gardner offered similar in the Los Angeles Times, finding that with Be Here Now, the band grew more ambitious and succeeded without losing ground, although Gardner noted the "taut pop craftsmanship" that distinguished the band's two predecessors was "less prominent".

Nevertheless, the album received mixed reviews on release. In Entertainment Weekly, David Browne stated: "Much of the album is a messy, mucky keg o' sound that constantly threatens to spill over and drown Noel's innately melodic songs." He further criticised the overtly cluttered mix and overlong songs. He concluded: "They sound more ferocious and confident than ever, yet less intimate, more distanced." Similarly, Simon Williams called it "one of the daftest records ever made" in NME. Chris Norris criticised the lyrical content in Spin magazine, calling most of the lyrics on the record "meaningless". Ryan Schreiber of Pitchfork favourably compared the record to its two predecessors, finding that instead of "unforgettable three- to- four minute pop slices", there are now "six- to- ten minute long epics." In The Independent, Andrew Mueller criticised Be Here Now for a lack of new ideas, finding many of the lyrics "lazy", the songs too long and the overall album "disappointingly dull". Be Here Now proved divisive among Planet Sound readers, who voted the album their "most loathed" of 1997, as well as their second-favourite of the year, behind Radiohead's OK Computer.

=== Retrospective appraisal ===
Professional ratings
Retrospective reviews
Aggregate scores
Source	Rating
Metacritic	57/100 (2016 reissue)
Review scores
Source	Rating
AllMusic	3.5/5 stars
Clash	8/10
Classic Rock	3/5 stars
Drowned in Sound	5/10
Encyclopedia of Popular Music	3/5 stars
Mojo	3/5 stars
Pitchfork	5.3/10
The Rolling Stone Album Guide	2.5/5 stars
Spin	3/5 stars
Uncut	6/10

Retrospectively, reception to Be Here Now has been more negative, with critics calling it bloated and over-produced. Reviewing in 2002, Stephen Thompson of The A.V. Club felt that although there were good tracks present, naming "My Big Mouth", "Don't Go Away" and "Stand by Me", the majority suffered from "cumbersome overlength", feeling that the band's attempt to make a "grand, career-defining statement" backfired. In The Rolling Stone Album Guide (2004), Rob Sheffield described the record as "a concept album about how long all the songs were", comparing it to Elton John's Captain Fantastic and the Brown Dirt Cowboy (1975). Although he offered praise to the title track and "It's Getting Better (Man!!)", he considered the album to be the work of a songwriter who has "turn[ed] his brain [in]to cocaine crispies". In a more positive review, Stephen Thomas Erlewine of AllMusic calls Be Here Now a "triumphant" record that "steamrolls over any criticism", praising Liam's vocal performances as his finest up to that point, as well as the songs as "intensely enjoyable" and "impossibly catchy". However, he felt that Noel's songwriting wasn't innovative compared to its predecessors.

The album's 2016 reissue attracted a number of reviews, with most continuing to criticise the album's production and song lengths. Laura Snapes of Pitchfork described Be Here Now as being "one of the most agonizing listening experiences in pop music", amplified by its "bloated and indulgent" remaster. Snapes further panned Noel's decision to only remix "D'You Know What I Mean?", concluding that "this turgid collection is the ultimate expression of Be Here Now: as bloated and indulgent as the record itself, the music a secondary concern to the product's status".

Andrzej Lukowski of Drowned in Sound felt that when compared to the band's earlier work, Be Here Now lacked "aspirational rock 'n' roll swagger" besides a few tracks; he also agreed that a complete remix of the album would have been beneficial, considering "D'You Know What I Mean?" needed it "the least". In Clash magazine, Clarke Geddes was more positive, agreeing that although the album was bloated and over-produced, it still offered highlights, naming "I Hope, I Think, I Know". He also positively appraised the bonus tracks in the box set, believing fans will be satisfied with the extra material.

However, in contrast to its later negative reception, Angus Batey of The Quietus offered a highly positive reappraisal of Be Here Now upon its 2016 reissue, calling it "the best Oasis album"; he praised the album's lyricism as deeper and superior to its predecessors while arguing that its backlash reflected "a record that too accurately reflect[ed] the underlying chaos and instability of the era it was made in". In 2020, Luke Holland of The Guardian described Be Here Now as a "flawed masterpiece"; writing that "as a snapshot of 90s excess – a bygone age of pig-headed rock-star bravado – it’s a preposterous hoot."

== Legacy ==
It's the sound of ... a bunch of guys, on coke, in the studio, not giving a fuck. There's no bass to it at all; I don't know what happened to that ... And all the songs are really long and all the lyrics are shit and for every millisecond Liam is not saying a word, there's a fuckin' guitar riff in there in a Wayne's World stylie.

— Noel Gallagher reflecting on Be Here Now

In the 2003 John Dower-directed documentary Live Forever: The Rise and Fall of Brit Pop, music critic Jon Savage pinpointed Be Here Now as the moment where the Britpop movement ended. Savage said that while the album "isn't the great disaster that everybody says", he noted that "[i]t was supposed to be the big, big triumphal record" of the period. Q expressed similar sentiments, writing, "So colossally did Be Here Now fall short of expectations that it killed Britpop and ushered in an era of more ambitious, less overblown music." Irish Times journalist Brian Boyd wrote: "Bloated and over-heated (much like the band themselves at the time), the album has all that dreadful braggadocio that is so characteristic of a cocaine user." Reflecting in 2007, Garry Mulholland said: "The fact that nothing could have lived up to the fevered expectations that surrounded its release doesn't change the facts. The third Oasis album is a loud, lumbering noise signifying nothing." When reviewing in 2016, Lukowski wrote that although Oasis as a band would continue, Oasis as a legend died with Be Here Now. He further states that while other Britpop bands such as Pulp and Blur moved on from the Britpop-era success, Oasis continued attempting to revisit the success of their first two albums.

The Gallagher brothers hold differing opinions about the album. In July 1997, Noel was describing the production as "bland" and some tracks as "fucking shit". He later said: "Just because you sell lots of records, it doesn't mean to say you're any good. Look at Phil Collins." In Live Forever: The Rise and Fall of Brit Pop, he dismissed the album, and said that drugs and the band's indifference during recording led to the album having faults. In the same documentary, Liam defended the record, and said that "at that time we thought it was fucking great, and I still think it's great. It just wasn't Morning Glory." In 2006, Liam said of Noel, "If he didn't like the record that much, he shouldn't have put the fucking record out in the first place ... I don't know what's up with him but it's a top record, man, and I'm proud of it—it's just a little bit long." In 2018, the BBC included it in their list of "acclaimed albums that nobody listens to anymore." Noel has observed that many Oasis fans still hold the album in high regard, as do prominent musicians such as Marilyn Manson. In 2017, Liam ranked the album as his favourite release by Oasis.

The album was reissued in several limited-edition formats, including silver-coloured double heavyweight vinyl, a double picture disc and cassette, on 19 August 2022 to celebrate its 25th anniversary. The reissue was promoted with new lyric videos for "D'You Know What I Mean? (NG's 2016 Rethink)" and "Stand by Me".

== Track listing ==
All tracks are written by Noel Gallagher.

Be Here Now track listing
No.	Title	Length
1.	"D'You Know What I Mean?"	7:42
2.	"My Big Mouth"	5:02
3.	"Magic Pie"	7:19
4.	"Stand by Me"	5:55
5.	"I Hope, I Think, I Know"	4:23
6.	"The Girl in the Dirty Shirt"	5:49
7.	"Fade In-Out"	6:52
8.	"Don't Go Away"	4:48
9.	"Be Here Now"	5:13
10.	"All Around the World"	9:20
11.	"It's Gettin' Better (Man!!)"	7:00
12.	"All Around the World (Reprise)"	2:08
Total length:		71:31

=== 2016 reissue ===
As part of a promotional campaign entitled Chasing the Sun, the album was re-released on 14 October 2016. The three-disc deluxe edition includes remastered versions of the album and seven B-sides from the album's three UK singles. Bonus content includes demos, the Mustique sessions, live tracks, and a 2016 remix of "D'You Know What I Mean?" Noel Gallagher was supposed to remix the entire album but later decided against it.

All tracks are written by Noel Gallagher, except where noted.

2016 reissue disc 2: B-Sides and Demos
No.	Title	Writer(s)	Length
1.	"Stay Young"		5:08
2.	"The Fame"		4:36
3.	"Flashbax"		5:09
4.	"(I Got) The Fever"		5:15
5.	"My Sister Lover"		5:59
6.	"Going Nowhere"		4:42
7.	"Stand by Me" (live at Bonehead's Outtake)		6:03
8.	Untitled (demo)		4:38
9.	"Help!" (live in L.A. – January 1998 at Universal Amphitheatre)	John Lennon, Paul McCartney	3:45
10.	"Setting Sun" (live Radio Broadcast – July 1997 for Radio Deejay Milano)	Tom Rowlands, Ed Simons, Gallagher	3:56
11.	"If We Shadows" (demo)		4:53
12.	"Don't Go Away" (demo – 14 September 1994 soundcheck at Club Quattro Tokyo)		3:43
13.	"My Big Mouth" (live at Knebworth Park, 10 August 1996)		5:21
14.	"D'You Know What I Mean?" (NG's 2016 Rethink)		7:23
Total length:			70:31

2016 reissue disc 3: The Mustique Sessions
No.	Title	Length
1.	"D'You Know What I Mean?"	7:15
2.	"My Big Mouth"	5:17
3.	"My Sister Lover"	6:09
4.	"Stand by Me"	6:01
5.	"I Hope, I Think, I Know"	4:11
6.	"The Girl in the Dirty Shirt"	5:23
7.	"Don't Go Away"	4:18
8.	"Trip Inside (Be Here Now)"	3:35
9.	"Fade In-Out"	6:03
10.	"Stay Young"	4:56
11.	"Angel Child"	4:28
12.	"The Fame"	4:45
13.	"All Around the World"	6:31
14.	"It's Gettin' Better (Man!!)"	6:38
Total length:		75:30

Japanese 2016 deluxe edition (disc one)
No.	Title	Length
13.	"All Around the World" (demo)	5:55
Total length:		77:28

== Personnel ==
Album credits per the album's liner notes.

Oasis
- Liam Gallagher – vocals (1–2, 4–11)
- Noel Gallagher – lead guitar, backing vocals, lead vocals and Mellotron (3), string arrangements, production
- Paul "Bonehead" Arthurs – rhythm guitar
- Paul "Guigsy" McGuigan – bass guitar
- Alan "Whitey" White – drums, percussion

Additional personnel

- Mike Rowe – keyboards
- Mark Coyle – backwards guitar (track 1)
- Johnny Depp – slide guitar (track 7)
- Mark Feltham – harmonica (track 10)
- Richard Ashcroft – backing vocals (track 10)
- Nick Ingman – string and brass arrangements
- Owen Morris – production
- Mike Marsh – mastering
- Brian Cannon – art direction, design
- Martin Catherall – design assistance
- Matthew Sankey – design assistance
- Michael Spencer Jones – photography
- Jill Furmanovsky – photography collage

== Charts ==
=== Weekly charts ===
Weekly chart performance for Be Here Now
Chart (1997)	Peak position
Argentine Albums (CAPIF)	5
Australian Albums (ARIA)	1
Austrian Albums (Ö3 Austria)	3
Belgian Albums (Ultratop Flanders)	1
Belgian Albums (Ultratop Wallonia)	2
Canadian Albums (Billboard)	1
Danish Albums (Hitlisten)	1
Dutch Albums (Album Top 100)	1
Estonian Albums (Eesti Top 10)	2
European Albums (Billboard)	1
Finnish Albums (Suomen virallinen lista)	1
French Albums (SNEP)	1
German Albums (Offizielle Top 100)	2
Hungarian Albums (MAHASZ)	13
Icelandic Albums (Tónlist)	1
Irish Albums (IRMA)	1
Italian Albums (FIMI)	1
Japanese Albums (Oricon)	3
Malaysian Albums (RIM)	2
New Zealand Albums (RMNZ)	1
Norwegian Albums (VG-lista)	1
Portuguese Albums (AFP)	3
Scottish Albums (Official Charts)	1
Spanish Albums (PROMUSICAE)	3
Swedish Albums (Sverigetopplistan)	1
Swiss Albums (Schweizer Hitparade)	2
UK Albums (Official Charts)	1
US Billboard 200	2
Zimbabwean Albums (ZIMA)	2

=== Year-end charts ===
1997 year-end chart performance for Be Here Now
Chart (1997)	Position
Australian Albums (ARIA)	57
Austrian Albums (Ö3 Austria)	39
Belgian Albums (Ultratop Flanders)	61
Belgian Albums (Ultratop Wallonia)	33
Canadian Albums (Nielsen Soundscan)	44
Dutch Albums (Album Top 100)	30
European Albums (Music & Media)	11
French Albums (SNEP)	26
German Albums (Offizielle Top 100)	49
New Zealand Albums (RMNZ)	28
Spanish Albums (AFYPE)	35
Swedish Albums & Compilations (Sverigetopplistan)	12
Swiss Albums (Schweizer Hitparade)	35
UK Albums (OCC)	1
US Billboard 200	122

1998 year-end chart performance for Be Here Now
Chart (1998)	Position
UK Albums (OCC)	88

== Certifications ==
Certifications for Be Here Now
Region	Certification	Certified units/sales
Argentina (CAPIF)	Gold	30,000^{^}
Australia (ARIA)	Platinum	70,000^{^}
Belgium (BRMA)	Gold	25,000^{*}
Brazil (Pro-Música Brasil)	Platinum	250,000^{‡}
Canada (Music Canada)	2× Platinum	200,000^{^}
Finland (Musiikkituottajat)	Gold	26,099
France (SNEP)	2× Gold	200,000^{*}
Germany (BVMI)	Gold	250,000^{^}
Hong Kong (IFPI Hong Kong)	Platinum	20,000^{*}
Italy (FIMI) sales since 2009	Gold	25,000^{‡}
Japan (RIAJ)	2× Platinum	400,000^{^}
Netherlands (NVPI)	Gold	50,000^{^}
New Zealand (RMNZ)	Platinum	15,000^{^}
Norway (IFPI Norway)	Gold	25,000^{*}
Poland (ZPAV)	Gold	50,000^{*}
Spain (Promusicae)	Platinum	100,000^{^}
Sweden (GLF)	Platinum	80,000^{^}
Switzerland (IFPI Switzerland)	Gold	25,000^{^}
United Kingdom (BPI)	7× Platinum	2,100,000^{^}
United States (RIAA)	Platinum	1,000,000^{^}
Summaries
Europe (IFPI)	3× Platinum	3,000,000^{*}
^{*} Sales figures based on certification alone.^{^} Shipments figures based on certification alone.^{‡} Sales+streaming figures based on certification alone.
