= All Around the World (Oasis song) =

1998 single by Oasis

Single by Oasis

from the album Be Here Now
- B-side: "The Fame"; "Flashbax"; "Street Fighting Man"
- Released: 12 January 1998
- Length: 9:20 (album version); 9:38 (single version); 4:51 (edit)
- Label: Creation
- Songwriter: Noel Gallagher
- Producers: Owen Morris; Noel Gallagher

Oasis singles chronology
"Stand by Me" (1997)	"All Around the World" (1998)	"Don't Go Away" (1998)

Music video
- "All Around the World" on YouTube

Be Here Now track listing
- 12 tracks: 1. "D'You Know What I Mean?"; 2. "My Big Mouth"; 3. "Magic Pie"; 4. "Stand by Me"; 5. "I Hope, I Think, I Know"; 6. "The Girl in the Dirty Shirt"; 7. "Fade In-Out"; 8. "Don't Go Away"; 9. "Be Here Now"; 10. "All Around the World"; 11. "It's Gettin' Better (Man!!)"; 12. "All Around the World (Reprise)"

"All Around the World" is a song by the English rock band Oasis. It was written by the band's lead guitarist and principal songwriter Noel Gallagher. Released on 12 January 1998 as the third single from their third studio album, Be Here Now (1997). The song peaked at number one on the UK Singles Chart, becoming the longest song by duration to reach number one, and earned a gold certification. This was the last Oasis single to be released on the Creation Records label. The song also reached number one in Ireland and peaked at number 15 on the US Billboard Modern Rock Tracks chart.

Nearly ten minutes long, the song is embellished with string and horn pieces, and is followed by the two-minute-long instrumental "All Around the World (Reprise)". Upon its release, the reviews were generally positive. As with many Oasis songs (such as "Whatever", "Acquiesce", "Live Forever") it sends the message that "everything's gonna be okay". This was their last UK single to feature rhythm guitarist Paul "Bonehead" Arthurs and bassist Paul McGuigan before they left the band in 1999.

== History ==
The song was one of the first to be written by Noel, and there are recorded sessions of the band rehearsing it at the Boardwalk club as early as 1992. However, despite Noel's fondness for the song, it did not appear on their first two albums—Definitely Maybe and (What's the Story) Morning Glory?—as he wanted to wait until the band could afford to produce the song in the extravagant manner in which it eventually appeared. Gallagher has claimed that this is one of the best songs he has ever written. Noel even thought it was good enough that could make Oasis enter the Eurovision Song Contest with it and win by "at least, oooh thirty points".

The final production sound for the song was envisaged as early as spring 1994. In the interview "Wibbling Rivalry", Noel Gallagher said of the song, "With 'Supersonic', I worried I was never going to write another song after that 'cos I thought, 'It sounds that good'... Two days later I superseded it by about 50 fuckin' times. The reason we haven't recorded that song is because there isn't enough money in Creation Records' bank balance to pay for the production of that record." Noel also added when asked if there would be an orchestra on it, "Orchestras, man? It's not got to be one, it's got to be two". Due to the circumstances, Noel had to defer recording "All Around the World" or "Whatever", stating that it will not appear on the first and the second album but the third or fourth ones.

The final version premiered on 11 August 1997 on BBC Radio 1's The Evening Session hosted by Steve Lamacq, ten days before the release of the album, alongside the album tracks "The Girl in the Dirty Shirt" and "Be Here Now".

Noel described the song shortly before the release of the album: "I wrote this one ages ago, before 'Whatever'. It was twelve minutes long then. It was a matter of being able to afford to record it. But now we can get away with the 36-piece orchestra. And the longer the better as far as I'm concerned. If it's good. I can see what people are going to say, but fuck 'em, basically."

"The lyrics are teeny-poppy. But there are three key changes towards the end. Imagine how much better 'Hey Jude' would have been with three key changes towards the end. I like the ambition of it, all that time ago. What was all that about when we didn't even have our first single out? Gin and tonics, eh?"

The harmonica pieces on the track were performed by Mark Feltham. Backing vocals were provided by Noel and Liam's then-wives, Meg Mathews and Patsy Kensit, along with Richard Ashcroft of the Verve.

When it was suggested (by Dominic Mohan) that Oasis take legal action against pop band Hear'Say for their first single's ("Pure and Simple") similarity to "All Around the World", Noel simply laughed at the hypocrisy of such an act from a man who was famous for "borrowing" from other artists. Portions of the song's chorus were used as background music for AT&T's advertising campaign for "The New AT&T" after their merger with SBC.

== Reprise ==
A two-minute, ten-second instrumental reprise of the song closes the Be Here Now album.

== Critical reception ==
British Music Week gave "All Around the World" four out of five, writing, "Another slice of wall of sound from the Gallagher brothers [...]. Obviously inspired by The Beatles' 'Hey Jude', this is typically catchy and destined to become another classic sing-along Oasis hit."

Writing in an album review for Entertainment Weekly in September 1997, David Browne said that the "wide-screen soar and sing-along finale" of "All Around the World" was "pure, unabashed 'Hey Jude'."

Retrospectively, Alexis Petridis of The Guardian ranked the track 26th in his list of Oasis's greatest songs, writing that it was "a great song" that "deserved a better fate than being inflated to nine and a half minutes of melodramatic key changes, guitar solos and would-be Hey Jude-esque na-na-na-ing", while adding that, "Twenty years on, its preposterousness seems more charming than it did at the time."

== Music video ==
Keeping with the feel of the song, the music video was also a lavish affair. Featuring the band in a yellow spaceship, the animated piece saw them travel through a world akin to The Beatles' Yellow Submarine film. The video was directed by Jonathan Dayton and Valerie Faris and took 24 computer animators and 6 months to make. The video later received a nomination for Best Short Form Music Video at the 41st Grammy Awards.

== Track listings ==
- UK 7-inch and cassette single
1. "All Around the World" (7-inch edit)
2. "The Fame"
- UK and Australian CD single
1. "All Around the World"
2. "The Fame"
3. "Flashbax"
4. "Street Fighting Man" (Jagger/Richards)
- UK 12-inch single
1. "All Around the World"
2. "The Fame"
3. "Flashbax"

== Personnel ==
Oasis

- Liam Gallagher – lead vocals, tambourine
- Noel Gallagher – lead and acoustic guitars, backing vocals
- Paul Arthurs – rhythm guitar
- Paul McGuigan – bass
- Alan White – drums

Additional musicians

- Mike Rowe – piano
- Mark Feltham – harmonica
- Richard Ashcroft – backing vocals
- Patsy Kensit - backing vocals
- Meg Matthews - backing vocals
- Nick Ingman – string and brass arrangements

== Charts ==
=== Weekly charts ===
Chart (1998)	Peak position
Australia (ARIA)	69
Canada Top Singles (RPM)	20
Europe (Eurochart Hot 100)	7
Finland (Suomen virallinen lista)	3
Germany (GfK)	84
Hungary (Mahasz)	9
Iceland (Íslenski Listinn Topp 40)	9
Ireland (IRMA)	1
Italy (Musica e dischi)	20
Italy Airplay (Music & Media)	2
Netherlands (Dutch Top 40 Tipparade)	8
Netherlands (Single Top 100)	47
New Zealand (Recorded Music NZ)	24
Norway (VG-lista)	9
Scottish Singles Sales (Official Charts)	1
Sweden (Sverigetopplistan)	7
UK Singles (Official Charts)	1
UK Indie (Official Charts)	1
US Alternative Airplay (Billboard)	15

=== Year-end charts ===
Chart (1998)	Position
Iceland (Íslenski Listinn Topp 40)	68
UK Singles (OCC)	77
US Modern Rock Tracks (Billboard)	92

== Certifications ==
Region	Certification	Certified units/sales
United Kingdom (BPI)	Platinum	600,000^{‡}
^{‡} Sales+streaming figures based on certification alone.

== Release history ==
Region	Date	Format(s)	Label(s)	Ref.
United Kingdom	12 January 1998	7-inch vinyl; CD; cassette	Creation	
United States	12 January 1998	Modern rock radio	Epic	
Japan	14 January 1998	CD	Epic	
United Kingdom	19 January 1998	12-inch vinyl	Creation	
