= Sunset (True Blood) =

- True Blood episode
- Episode no.: Season 5 Episode 11
- Directed by: Lesli Linka Glatter
- Written by: Angela Robinson
- Production code: 511
- Original air date: August 19, 2012
- Running time: 51 minutes

Episode chronology
← Previous "Gone, Gone, Gone"	Next → "Save Yourself"
- True Blood (season 5)

"Sunset" is the eleventh episode of the HBO TV series True Blood's fifth season, while the 59th episode overall. The episode is followed by Save Yourself and is preceded by Gone, Gone, Gone. The episode has better reviews and viewers than all of the episodes of its season, except for the season premiere, Turn, Turn, Turn, which so far has the most positive reviews and viewers.

== Plot ==
=== Sookie and Jason ===
Sookie hides at the faeries' club, while Jason is warned by Jessica that Russell is coming for Sookie. Jason is glamored into revealing the hideout of the faeries by Russell and Steve, resulting in the faerie elder going to confront the vampires, but she is killed, leaving the club vulnerable.

=== Bill and Eric ===
Bill is "chosen" by Lilith to drink all of her blood, however, she then says this to Salome and others in the Authority to turn them against each other. Nora visits Eric and they have sex, after she realizes Eric is right, and decides to help him in saving the Authority and Bill. Meanwhile, Bill, who is preparing to drink Lilith's blood, kills a fellow vampire for the blood. Afterward, the Authority are visited by an army general, who states he has footage of Steve Newlin and Russell Edgington, while then stating he needs to speak to Roman. Bill reveals they killed Roman, Eric kills the man, as Eric and Nora prepare to glamour people into forgetting the man while Bill decides to destroy all copies of the tape.

=== Andy ===
Andy receives an apology from Holly's kids, and decides he wants a committed relationship with Holly, however, is told by Maurella that she is pregnant, as well as reminding him of his promise to keep her safe, making him conflicted.

=== Sam and Luna ===
Sam and Luna, in mouse form, roam around the Authority, finally finding Emma, however, they are then captured once again.

=== Alcide ===
After being attacked by teenage vampires, Alcide and his father hunt down the three vampires and kills two of them.

=== Pam, Jessica, and Tara ===
Pam and Tara clean up Elijah's body; Jessica, after learning about Russell's attempt to kill Sookie, decides to call Jason, but Bill asks her why, and refuses. However, she convinces him she wishes to turn Jason into a vampire, although he sends two Authority guards to make sure she does. Jessica nearly turns him in, but he shoots the guards, and goes to find Sookie. Jessica then goes to Pam and Tara for help, but Pam refuses, though letting Jessica stay in Fangtasia. Pam is then arrested by the Authority after they learn of Elijah's demise and Jessica is taken as well.

== Critical reception ==
A USA Today review says: "Overall 'Sunset' is very intriguing, but as Sookie dutifully parses information about her ancestor, vampires kill each other and the world teeters to the brink, we want to know what happens, but the journey in this episode is not the end in itself that we might wish it to be." The episode has the most positive reviews and viewers, except for Turn, Turn, Turn! which has the most of the season.

=== Viewers ===
The episode had an overall amount of 4.93, which is almost the best, except for the season premiere.
