= Stand by Me (Oasis song) =

1997 single by Oasis

Single by Oasis

from the album Be Here Now
- B-side: "(I Got) The Fever"; "My Sister Lover"; "Going Nowhere"
- Released: 22 September 1997
- Genre: Rock
- Length: 5:56 (album version); 4:51 (radio edit)
- Label: Creation
- Songwriter: Noel Gallagher
- Producers: Owen Morris; Noel Gallagher

Oasis singles chronology
"D'You Know What I Mean?" (1997)	"Stand by Me" (1997)	"All Around the World" (1998)

Be Here Now track listing
- 12 tracks: 1. "D'You Know What I Mean?"; 2. "My Big Mouth"; 3. "Magic Pie"; 4. "Stand by Me"; 5. "I Hope, I Think, I Know"; 6. "The Girl in the Dirty Shirt"; 7. "Fade In-Out"; 8. "Don't Go Away"; 9. "Be Here Now"; 10. "All Around the World"; 11. "It's Gettin' Better (Man!!)"; 12. "All Around the World (Reprise)"

"Stand by Me" is a song by the English rock band Oasis, written by lead guitarist, Noel Gallagher. It was released on 22 September 1997 as the second single from the band's third studio album, Be Here Now (1997).

The song peaked at number two on the UK Singles Chart in September 1997. Initially being certified gold in the UK in October 1997, the song would eventually reach platinum status there in 2019, before reaching double platinum status in 2025. It was ranked number 46 on the year-end chart of the United Kingdom for 1997. The song also reached number two in Ireland and entered the top 10 in Finland, Iceland, Italy, Norway, Spain and Sweden.

== History ==
Noel Gallagher wrote the song whilst suffering from food poisoning when he first moved to London. His mother Peggy would phone him to check on him and repeatedly told him to ensure he was eating properly. This spurred Gallagher to cook himself a proper British Sunday dinner, which resulted in a bout of food poisoning. In a 1997 interview promoting Be Here Now, Noel Gallagher had the following to say: "It starts, 'Made a meal and threw it up on Sunday'. When I first moved to London me mam kept on ringing up and asking was I eating properly. Yes, Mam. So I tried to cook a Sunday roast and puked up for two days with food poisoning. It was back to Pot Noodles after that."

== Release and reception ==
"Stand by Me" was first included as the fourth track on the band's third studio album, Be Here Now, which was released on 21 August 1997. It was released as a single a month later, on 22 September 1997.

In a 2002 review, Stephen Thompson of The A.V. Club called "Stand by Me" one of the only good tracks present, also naming "My Big Mouth" and "Don't Go Away". Reviewing the album's 2016 deluxe edition, Laura Snapes of Pitchfork gave an overall distaste for the album, but called "Stand by Me" "genuinely touching". Andrzej Lukowski of Drowned in Sound also considered "Stand by Me" one of the album's highlights, but felt that it, along with "Don't Go Away" and "The Girl in the Dirty Shirt", lacked the "romance" of the band's earlier works.

== Live performances ==
Due to Noel's general dislike of Be Here Now, "Stand by Me" was rarely played live by the band at their concerts after the Be Here Now Tour, as it was Noel who usually decided the set lists for Oasis' tours. A live version of the song from this tour can be found on the double-CD version of Familiar to Millions.

A well-known acoustic version of "Stand by Me" was shown on television the night before the release of Be Here Now as part of a BBC One documentary, featuring Noel, Liam Gallagher and drummer Alan White sitting by the side of a swimming pool, with Liam on vocals, Noel on acoustic guitar and White playing tambourine. This version became available with the 2016 "Chasing the Sun" edition of Be Here Now.

In 2019, Liam performed the song for the first time since 2001 as part of an acoustic set for MTV Unplugged, backed by former bandmate Paul "Bonehead" Arthurs. This recording would later be released in 2020 on the live album MTV Unplugged (Live at Hull City Hall). The performance was praised by Jordan Bassett of NME, who called it the album's standout track: "[It] provides the show's emotional centrepiece; from the way the audience sings along with his wounded dispatch, you sense Liam Gallagher's not the only person in the room nursing a few regrets."

It has since remained a consistent staple of Liam's solo setlists. Beginning in 2022, Noel also began performing the song live again, mainly in an acoustic line-up.

Since Oasis' reunion in 2025, the song has been performed at every live show as part of the Oasis Live '25 Tour setlist.

== Music video ==
The video for the song was shot on 20 September 1997. It was a reworking of a famous series of adverts for The Guardian newspaper. Entitled 'The Whole Picture', the adverts showed people appearing to be engaging in criminal and/or anti-social acts—only for it to be revealed that they are actually helping someone else. For example, a scruffily-dressed skinhead rushes at a businessman; it appears he is making an effort to mug him and break into his car, when he is actually getting it open for the businessman who locked the key inside it. Similarly, the music video shows a shop appearing to be being burgled – its window is smashed and people are taking away electrical goods – only for it to be revealed that in fact the victim of a motorcycle crash has gone through the window and is buried under the goods. At the same time, a man who was earlier shown to be apparently running away from approaching police officers was actually rushing to save a girl from being run over by the motorcycle – the officers just happened to come by at that time. The video was filmed in the district of Feltham, West London.

== Other uses ==
From 2021 to 2023, the song appeared in adverts for British bank Halifax.

== Track listings ==
UK 7-inch and cassette single

1. "Stand by Me"
2. "(I Got) The Fever"

UK CD single

1. "Stand by Me"
2. "(I Got) The Fever"
3. "My Sister Lover"
4. "Going Nowhere"

UK 12-inch single

A1. "Stand by Me"
B1. "(I Got) The Fever"
B2. "My Sister Lover"

== Personnel ==
- Liam Gallagher – lead vocals, handclaps
- Noel Gallagher – lead and rhythm guitars, backing vocals, string arrangements
- Paul Arthurs – rhythm guitar
- Paul McGuigan – bass
- Alan White – drums
- Uncredited – orchestra
- Mike Rowe – piano

== Charts ==
=== Weekly charts ===
1997 weekly chart performance for "Stand by Me"
Chart (1997)	Peak position
Australia (ARIA)	48
Belgium (Ultratip Bubbling Under Flanders)	10
Europe (Eurochart Hot 100)	7
Finland (Suomen virallinen lista)	5
Germany (GfK)	60
Iceland (Íslenski Listinn Topp 40)	3
Ireland (IRMA)	2
Italy (Musica e dischi)	13
Italy Airplay (Music & Media)	1
Netherlands (Dutch Top 40)	39
Netherlands (Single Top 100)	50
New Zealand (Recorded Music NZ)	31
Norway (VG-lista)	6
Scottish Singles Sales (Official Charts)	2
Spain (AFYVE)	6
Sweden (Sverigetopplistan)	10
Switzerland (Schweizer Hitparade)	34
UK Singles (Official Charts)	2
UK Indie (Music Week)	1

2025 weekly chart performance for "Stand by Me"
Chart (2025)	Peak position
Japan Hot Overseas (Billboard Japan)	20

=== Year-end charts ===
Year-end chart performance for "Stand by Me"
Chart (1997)	Position
Iceland (Íslenski Listinn Topp 40)	39
UK Singles (OCC)	46

== Certifications ==
Certifications for "Stand by Me"
Region	Certification	Certified units/sales
Australia (ARIA)	Gold	35,000^{‡}
Brazil (Pro-Música Brasil)	Gold	30,000^{‡}
Italy (FIMI)	Gold	25,000^{‡}
United Kingdom (BPI)	2× Platinum	1,200,000^{‡}
^{‡} Sales+streaming figures based on certification alone.

== Release history ==
Release dates and formats for "Stand by Me"
Region	Date	Format(s)	Label(s)	Ref.
United Kingdom	22 September 1997	7-inch vinyl; CD; cassette	Creation	
Japan	26 September 1997	CD	Epic	
