= Don't Go Away =

1998 single by Oasis

Single by Oasis

from the album Be Here Now
- B-side: "Cigarettes & Alcohol" (live); "Sad Song"; "Fade Away" (Warchild version)
- Released: 13 May 1998 (Note: Released as a commercial single only in Japan.)
- Recorded: 1997
- Length: 4:48
- Label: Epic
- Songwriter: Noel Gallagher
- Producers: Owen Morris; Noel Gallagher

Oasis singles chronology
"All Around the World" (1998)	"Don't Go Away" (1998)	"Acquiesce" (1998)

Be Here Now track listing
- 12 tracks: 1. "D'You Know What I Mean?"; 2. "My Big Mouth"; 3. "Magic Pie"; 4. "Stand by Me"; 5. "I Hope, I Think, I Know"; 6. "The Girl in the Dirty Shirt"; 7. "Fade In-Out"; 8. "Don't Go Away"; 9. "Be Here Now"; 10. "All Around the World"; 11. "It's Gettin' Better (Man!!)"; 12. "All Around the World (Reprise)"

Music video
- "Oasis - Don't Go Away" on YouTube

"Don't Go Away" is a song by English rock band Oasis from their third album, Be Here Now (1997). Written by Noel Gallagher, the song was released to radio in the US in September 1997 and as a commercial single only in Japan, peaking at number 49 on the Oricon chart, and as a promotional single in the United States and Canada. The track reached number 35 on the US Billboard Hot 100 Airplay chart and number 15 on the Canadian RPM 100 Hit Tracks chart in late 1997.

== Background and composition ==
Although "Don't Go Away" appears for the first time in 1997, its origins date back to 1993, when Oasis spent time with the Real People at their studio in Liverpool. "Don't Go Away" was included in a batch of songs written under the wing of the Griffiths brothers (which also included "Columbia", "Rock 'n' Roll Star", "Rockin' Chair" and others). Ultimately, portions of "Don't Go Away" drew comparisons to the Real People's song "Feel the Pain" (which was initially recorded for the Real People's album Marshmellow Lane in 1992 but the album remained unreleased until 2012).

Liam Gallagher claims to have cried while recording the song, as a result of dwelling on "a certain thing". He said, in a 1997 interview, "I just thought 'fuck that, I can't be singing this song' and I had to go away and sort myself out". Listening back to the song he admits to being very proud of his vocal performance.

In a 1997 interview promoting Be Here Now, Noel Gallagher had the following to say about the song: "It's a very sad song about not wanting to lose someone you're close to. The middle eight I made up on the spot – I never had that lyric until the day we recorded it: 'Me and you, what's going on?/ All we seem to know is how to show/ The feelings that are wrong.' It's after a row. Quite bleak."

"We put Burt Bacharach horns on because he was the master of break-up songs. I did all the string arrangements. I tried to keep them as simple as possible. I like the way Marc Bolan used them on 'Children of the Revolution'. People do remember string parts as separate hooklines, you know. You just don't want to use them slushily."

== Artwork ==
The cover of the single features the old Liverpool Speke Airport building. The airport is famous as the scene at which thousands of hysterical fans greeted the Beatles on their return to Liverpool at the height of Beatlemania. Derelict at the time, it has now been turned into a hotel. The aeroplane is an Avro Lancastrian.

== Scruton analysis ==
The song is analysed by philosopher Roger Scruton in his book Modern Culture, in particular with reference to the line: "Damn my education, I can't find the words to say / About the things caught in my mind". Scruton writes, "Here, encrypted within the routine protest, is a more strangulated cry—a protest against the impossibility of protest. Trapped as he is in a culture that treats articulate utterance as a capitulation to the adult world, the singer can find no words to express what most deeply concerns him. Something is lacking in his world—but he cannot say what. He excites his fans to every kind of artificial ecstasy, knowing that nothing will be changed for them or him, that the void will always remain unfilled".

== B-sides ==
The live version of "Cigarettes & Alcohol" was recorded 14 December 1997 at the G-MEX Exhibition Centre in Oasis' home town of Manchester.

"Sad Song" originally appeared as a bonus track on the vinyl release of the first Oasis album, Definitely Maybe. It also appeared on the Japanese CD edition of Definitely Maybe.

The 'Warchild' version of "Fade Away" is from The Help Album recorded in September 1995. It features Noel on vocals, and guests Johnny Depp on guitar, Kate Moss on tambourine and Liam and Lisa Moorish on backing vocals. All proceeds from that track went to Warchild Charities.

== Music video ==
The video to "Don't Go Away" shows the band in a house whilst changing sizes. One part of the video shows many versions of Liam Gallagher floating whilst holding an umbrella. The video was directed by Nigel Dick and was filmed on 11 and 12 August 1997 in Chertsey and London, UK.

== Track listing ==
Japanese CD single

1. "Don't Go Away" – 4:43
2. "Cigarettes & Alcohol" (live) – 4:58
3. "Sad Song" – 4:16
4. "Fade Away" (Warchild version) – 4:08

== Personnel ==
Oasis

- Liam Gallagher – lead vocals, tambourine
- Noel Gallagher – lead guitar, acoustic guitar
- Paul Arthurs – rhythm guitar, acoustic guitar
- Paul McGuigan – bass
- Alan White – drums

Additional musicians

- Mike Rowe – electric piano
- Nick Ingman – string and brass arrangements

== Charts ==
=== Weekly charts ===
Chart (1997)	Peak position
Canada Contemporary Hit Radio (The Record)	23
Canada Top Singles (RPM)	15
Canada Rock/Alternative (RPM)	1
Iceland (Íslenski Listinn Topp 40)	24
Japan (Oricon)	49
US Radio Songs (Billboard)	35
US Adult Alternative Airplay (Billboard)	15
US Adult Pop Airplay (Billboard)	27
US Alternative Airplay (Billboard)	5
US Mainstream Rock (Billboard)	36
US Pop Airplay (Billboard)	35

=== Year-end charts ===
Chart (1997)	Position
Canada Rock/Alternative (RPM)	6
US Modern Rock Tracks (Billboard)	57

Chart (1998)	Position
US Modern Rock Tracks (Billboard)	96

== Certifications ==
Region	Certification	Certified units/sales
Brazil (Pro-Música Brasil)	Gold	30,000^{‡}
United Kingdom (BPI)	Silver	200,000^{‡}
^{‡} Sales+streaming figures based on certification alone.

== Release history ==
Region	Date	Format(s)	Label(s)	Ref.
United States	23 September 1997	Contemporary hit radio	Epic	
Japan	13 May 1998	CD	Epic; Sony	
