= The Faculty =

1998 American science fiction horror film

- Theatrical release poster
- Directed by: Robert Rodriguez
- Screenplay by: Kevin Williamson
- Story by: David Wechter; Bruce Kimmel
- Produced by: Elizabeth Avellán
- Starring: Jordana Brewster; Clea DuVall; Laura Harris; Josh Hartnett; Shawn Hatosy; Famke Janssen; Piper Laurie; Bebe Neuwirth; Robert Patrick; Usher Raymond; Jon Stewart; Elijah Wood
- Cinematography: Enrique Chediak
- Edited by: Robert Rodriguez
- Music by: Marco Beltrami
- Production companies: Dimension Films; Los Hooligans Productions
- Distributed by: Miramax Films
- Release date: December 25, 1998
- Running time: 104 minutes
- Country: United States
- Language: English
- Budget: $15 million
- Box office: $63.2 million

The Faculty is a 1998 American science fiction horror film directed and edited by Robert Rodriguez with a screenplay by Kevin Williamson, about a group of high school students who begin to suspect that their teachers are being replaced by extraterrestrials. It stars Jordana Brewster in her film debut, Clea DuVall, Laura Harris, Josh Hartnett, Shawn Hatosy, Famke Janssen, Piper Laurie, Bebe Neuwirth, Robert Patrick, Usher Raymond, Jon Stewart, and Elijah Wood.

The film was theatrically released on December 25, 1998, by Miramax Films. It grossed $63.2 million and has developed a cult following since its release.

== Plot ==
One evening at Herrington High School in Ohio, Principal Drake is attacked by the school's football coach, Joe Willis, and drama teacher Mrs. Olson emotionlessly stabs Drake with scissors.

The following morning, the students arrive for school, including Casey Connor, the bullied photographer for the school newspaper and assistant to spiteful Delilah Profitt, the paper's editor-in-chief and head cheerleader. Delilah's boyfriend Stan Rosado is contemplating quitting the football team to pursue academics. Zeke Tyler is an intelligent but rebellious student repeating his senior year. Zeke sells powdery ecstasy-like drugs he concocts himself and distributes in ballpoint pens. Teacher Elizabeth Burke expresses concern for him over his illegal activities. Naive transfer student Marybeth Louise Hutchinson befriends emo outcast Stokely Mitchell, who has a crush on Stan.

Casey finds a strange creature on the football field and takes it to science teacher Mr. Furlong, who believes it is a new species of cephalopod-specific parasite called a mesozoan. Delilah and Casey witness Coach Willis and Ms. Olson forcing one of the parasites into the ear of the school nurse. They also find the body of another teacher, Mrs. Brummel. Casey calls the police, but his claims are dismissed.

The next day, Casey tells Delilah, Stan, and Stokely he believes the teachers are being controlled by aliens. They don't believe him until Mr. Furlong attempts to infect them. Zeke injects his homemade drug pen into Furlong's eye, killing him. The group flees to Zeke's house, where he experiments with a piece of the parasite. He discovers it needs water to survive and can be killed by his "drug", as it dehydrates and completely dries out the alien. Zeke makes everyone take his drug to prove they are uninfected. Delilah is revealed as infected and destroys Zeke's lab and most of his drug supply before escaping.

Acting on Stokely's speculation that killing the alien queen will revert everyone to normal, the group returns to the school, where their football team is playing and infecting opposing players. Believing Principal Drake to be the queen, they fatally shoot her. However, she is not the queen and Stan becomes infected himself. Zeke and Casey retrieve more of Zeke's drugs from his car. Zeke encounters Miss Burke and incapacitates her.

Marybeth reveals herself to be the alien queen; earlier on, she had faked taking the drug. Stokely becomes infected. Zeke and Casey hide in the locker room, where Marybeth explains that she is taking over Earth because her planet is dying. She transforms into her true form and knocks out Zeke. Casey traps the queen behind retracting bleachers. Just as the queen infects him, he stabs the drug into her eye, killing her and halting his infection.

One month later, everyone has returned to normal. Stan and Stokely, who has shed her goth image, are now dating. Zeke has taken Stan's place on the football team, while Miss Burke affectionately watches him practice. Delilah, no longer vindictive, is dating Casey, who is considered a local hero; the attempted alien invasion is now public knowledge, even as the FBI denies it.

== Cast ==
- Jordana Brewster as Delilah Profitt
- Clea DuVall as Stokely Mitchell
- Laura Harris as Marybeth Hutchinson
- Josh Hartnett as Zeke Tyler
- Shawn Hatosy as Stan Rosado
- Salma Hayek as Nurse Harper
- Famke Janssen as Miss Burke
- Piper Laurie as Mrs. Olson
- Chris McDonald as Casey's dad
- Bebe Neuwirth as Principal Drake
- Robert Patrick as Coach Willis
- Usher Raymond as Gabe
- Jon Stewart as Mr. Furlong
- Daniel von Bargen as Mr. Tate
- Elijah Wood as Casey Connor
- Summer Phoenix as "F*%# You" girl
- Jon Abrahams as "F*%# You" boy

== Production ==
In 1990, David Wechter and Bruce Kimmel wrote their first draft of the script and sent it out, but there were no buyers. It was not until after the success of Scream (1996) that Miramax Films bought the script and rushed it into production. Bob Weinstein and Harvey Weinstein brought in Kevin Williamson to do rewrites, keeping the basic story, but rewriting the dialogue and adding new characters to make it more "hip". Originally, Williamson was set to direct the film, but he chose not to so he could direct his self-penned script Teaching Mrs. Tingle (1999). The Weinsteins brought in Robert Rodriguez to direct the film instead.

The Faculty takes place in the fictional town of Herrington, Ohio, but was shot in Austin, San Marcos, Dallas, and Lockhart, Texas. In a retrospective interview, Clea Duvall said the making of the film "was so much fun. It was mostly night shoots, so it was like we were in this alternate universe. Working all night long and making this fun sci-fi horror movie. I loved it."

== Music ==
The Faculty: Music from the Dimension Motion Picture

Soundtrack album by various artists
- Released: December 8, 1998
- Genres: Alternative rock; industrial rock
- Label: Columbia

Professional ratings
Review scores
Source	Rating
AllMusic	link

The score is composed by Marco Beltrami, who had previously scored the teen-slasher-horror film, Scream, as well as Mimic (1997). Both Beltrami's score and songs by various artists used in the film were released as albums. The "music from the motion picture" album features songs by various indie and alternative rock groups.

=== Track listing ===
The Faculty: Music from the Dimension Motion Picture
No.	Title	Writer(s)	Producer(s)	Length
1.	"Another Brick in the Wall (Part 2)" (Class of '99)	Roger Waters	Matt Serletic	4:18
2.	"The Kids Aren't Alright" (The Offspring)	The Offspring	Dave Jerden	2:59
3.	"I'm Eighteen" (Creed)	Alice Cooper; Glen Buxton; Dennis Dunaway; Michael Bruce; Neal Smith	John Kurzweg	3:11
4.	"Helpless" (D Generation)	Jesse Malin	Tony Visconti	3:34
5.	"School's Out" (Soul Asylum)	Cooper; Smith; Bruce; Buxton; Dunaway	Kevin Shirley	3:25
6.	"Medication" (Garbage)	Garbage	Garbage	4:08
7.	"Haunting Me" (Stabbing Westward)	Stabbing Westward	Stabbing Westward; Ulrich Wild	3:38
8.	"Maybe Someday" (Flick)	Oran Thornton; Trevor Thornton	Joe Baldridge; Oran Thornton	3:47
9.	"Resuscitation" (Sheryl Crow)	Sheryl Crow; Jeff Trott	Sheryl Crow	3:59
10.	"It's Over Now" (Neve)	John Stephens	Serletic	4:01
11.	"Changes" (Shawn Mullins)	David Bowie	Shirley; Eric Bazilian	3:32
12.	"Stay Young" (Oasis)	Noel Gallagher	Owen Morris; Noel Gallagher	5:08
13.	"Another Brick in the Wall (Part 1)" (Class of '99)	Waters	Serletic	5:18

On March 7, 2023, the label Intrada released Beltrami's complete score for the movie.

== Release ==
=== Advertising ===
Several scenes involving an additional character named Venus, played by Kidada Jones, were shown in TV previews for the film, as well as in Tommy Hilfiger promotional commercials for the movie, but her scenes were cut from the final film. She is visible in a scene in the theatrical version, standing next to Gabe (Usher) in Mr. Furlong's (Jon Stewart) science class when they are looking at the "new species" in the aquarium.

=== Home media and rights ===
In the United States, the film's home video releases were initially handled by Buena Vista Home Entertainment (under the Dimension Home Video banner). The film was first released on VHS on May 14, 1999. On June 15, 1999, the film was released on DVD and LaserDisc in the United States. It also received a Hong Kong LaserDisc release in July 1999, which was handled by ERA Home Entertainment. The film's Australian Region 4 DVD release was handled by Village Roadshow, who had an Australian distribution agreement with Miramax at the time.

The film received its first U.S. Blu-ray release on September 11, 2012, through Echo Bridge. The film received a U.S. Blu-ray reissue on October 7, 2014, from Lionsgate Home Entertainment. The Lionsgate Blu-ray included a digital download code for the film. International Blu-ray releases for The Faculty occurred in several countries: in Canada on October 6, 2009, by Alliance; in Australia on September 1, 2011, by Reel; in the United Kingdom on October 3, 2011, by Lionsgate; in Germany on October 6, 2011, by Studio Canal; and in France on January 10, 2012, by Studio Canal.

On September 22, 2020, Paramount Home Entertainment released another Blu-ray edition of The Faculty. Paramount later sublicensed the home video rights for the film to Shout! Factory's horror label Scream Factory, and on December 17, 2024, Scream Factory released a 4K Ultra HD Blu-ray of the film. Home media for The Faculty, including recent releases, have not included any traditional extras provided for other Robert Rodriguez films, such as a "10-Minute Film School" feature, audio commentaries, and making-of featurettes.

On March 4, 2021, The Faculty was made available on Paramount's then-new streaming service Paramount+ as one of its inaugural launch titles. Paramount also included it on their free streaming service Pluto TV.

== Reception ==
=== Box office ===
The Faculty was viewed on 2,365 screens on its opening weekend, debuting at No. 5 in the US and making $11,633,495. Its eventual US gross was $40.3 million. Its debut below commercial expectations has been partly credited to the studio's decision to release the movie on Christmas Day, a time when audiences are likelier to watch traditional dramas or feel-good fare.

=== Critical response ===
On review aggregator website Rotten Tomatoes, The Faculty holds an approval rating of 57% based on 65 reviews, with an average rating of 6.00/10. The site's critics consensus called the film a "Rip-off of other sci-fi thrillers." On Metacritic, the film has a weighted average score of 61 out of 100 based on 19 critics, indicating "generally favorable reviews". Audiences polled by CinemaScore gave the film an average grade of "B" on an A+ to F scale.

Positive reviews at the time praised Kevin Williamson's self-aware script and trademark meta humor that included references to iconic science-fiction films. In a review for Variety, Dennis Harvey wrote, "The Faculty works hard at mixing a canny cocktail of cineastic in-jokes, affectionate teenploitation and high-octane suspense that's as enjoyable as it is impossible to take seriously." Harvey added that Williamson and Robert Rodriguez combine to "make a complete lack of socially redeeming value seem so much fun that 'The Faculty' might well become a pulp classic". Charles Taylor of Salon called the film "subversive" and said "its honest, good-natured junkiness… feels like a relief". He appreciated the film's homages to genre movies including Carrie (1976), Invasion of the Body Snatchers (1978) and Blue Velvet (1986) while also citing the character of Stokely as the standout amongst the teen archetypes.

Michael Sauter of Entertainment Weekly gave the film a grade of B− and expressed a wish that the film had used the faculty characters more. In contrast, Tom Sinclair, also of EW, gave the film a C+ and said Williamson has become "too invested in the earnestness of teen angst to portray it in the scathing parodistic terms a hip horror movie demands". The New York Times gave a mostly negative review but praised the cast. The Austin Chronicle awarded the film 3.5 stars and said, "While it may suffer a bit from excess character clutter (nearly 10 major characters throughout), it's nonetheless a slam-bang, sci-fi actioner, relentlessly paced and edited, with a pounding soundtrack and some ingenious aliens courtesy of Bernie Wrightson and KNB Effects."

=== Retrospective ===
In subsequent years, various critics have written about The Faculty's impact. Aliya Whiteley wrote, "It's all about examining the tropes of science fiction with a smart, funny angle. Half of the fun in this film is in identifying where you first came across a certain character's name or saw a particular special effect. For instance, there's a brilliant moment with a head on legs that I defy you to watch and not think of a certain John Carpenter film." Whiteley concluded, "The Faculty is very definitely a big mess of a movie. But if you love all things sci-fi, it's a good mess." Keith Phipps described the film as "a Kevin Williamson-scripted high-school variation on Invasion of the Body Snatchers." Haleigh Foutch considered it one of the most iconic 1990s teen horror films: "Yet another win from 90s teen screenwriter in chief Kevin Williamson, The Faculty fused Williamson's knack for snappy teen drama with Robert Rodriguez's subversive camp to fantastic results. It's smart without ever taking itself too seriously and campy without ever losing its cool, drawing proudly from the tradition of classic alien invasion movies and casting them in the 90s teen tradition."

Director Ryan Coogler cited The Faculty as one of the inspirations for his 2025 film Sinners. Coogler said, "I love The Faculty from Rodriguez. I love how he mashed up Invasion of the Body Snatchers and The Thing, but set it in a 1990s high school. I love the confusing mishmash of movie and setting."

=== Cast and director's reception ===
In a series of interviews, several The Faculty cast members reflected on their experiences with the film and its surprising journey to cult status. Robert Rodriguez, the director, shared that he had been drawn to The Faculty because of his love for genre-mixed films, even though he knew this would limit the movie's initial audience. He admitted that while the film did not perform as expected at the time, it had gained a strong following over the years: "I've never heard people talk so enthusiastically about The Faculty until the last couple of years." Rodriguez also recalled his casting process, highlighting how actors like Elijah Wood and Josh Hartnett stood out. He believed the film’s original title, The Faculty, did not resonate with younger audiences, suggesting titles like Alienated or The Others, which the studio later used for another movie.

Writer Kevin Williamson said he initially passed on the script for the film but eventually agreed to the project after producer Bob Weinstein repeatedly encouraged him to reconsider. Williamson later said that he ultimately enjoyed working on the film and cited his admiration for director Robert Rodriguez.

Jordana Brewster reflected on the contrast between The Faculty and The Fast and the Furious, noting that they expected The Faculty to be a massive hit due to the success of teen movies, such as Scream, at the time. She recalled thinking it would make them huge stars: “We all thought we were gonna be these huge teen stars... but it didn’t quite work out that way.” Despite the film’s initial underperformance, she is now proud of its cult status, which she finds "cool".

Clea DuVall also discussed the film's initial reception, noting that it did not have the impact they expected during its release, despite the popularity of Kevin Williamson's work at the time. However, she has been pleased to see The Faculty's lasting influence: "It's cool to see the legs that movie has had." She acknowledged that people still recognize her as Stokely, the character she portrayed, which continues to be a huge part of her legacy: "I feel like that is the number one thing that people come up to me and say or recognize me from still." DuVall mentioned that while she does not fully understand why the film did not perform better initially, she believes that broader cultural conversations may be partly responsible for its rediscovery.

Elijah Wood described his experience on The Faculty as one of his most memorable. He said, "For all around experience, I would say The Faculty because the crew was so amazing. [Robert Rodriguez] was amazing to work with. There aren't enough adjectives to describe how cool it was working with him." He went on to emphasize the fun and unique atmosphere on set, stating, "It was so fun getting a chance to work with Robert, who had a very different approach than any other director that I'd worked with." Wood also highlighted the close-knit environment, noting, "There was a lot of love on the set. We're all really close, so it was cool."

=== Analysis ===
The film has been praised for its portrayal of teenage alienation, especially within the high school environment and its system of cliques and social roles. In particular, the alien invasion through parasitized bodies has been recognized as functioning as a metaphor for those concepts, reflecting the fear of losing one's nascent individuality to a crowd. The alien queen encapsulates this by offering the heroes a world without alienation or differences, in which "everything that is both wonderful and awful about being a teenager is done away in favor of blind allegiance".

Experts also noted in The Faculty a reinvention of the fear of female sexuality often found in the horror genre. The character of Marybeth, the alien queen, is "a complex imbrication of woman, alien and power" that acts beyond the role of femme fatale. She masquerades as a virginal, unassuming girl clad in floral dresses, but at the final battle she reveals her true sexual threat, becoming nude by her alien transformation and turning confident and flirtatious. Her role as a threatening, castrating agent is underlined by the sharp teeth of her species, which evoke a vagina dentata, and their association to water, the archaic, womb-like female element. As the monstrous mother of her race, she tries to seduce the heroes by offering them a symbolic return to the womb. As Sharon Packer and Jody Pennington put it:

The image on the screen is dual: we see the beautiful, young, naked Marybeth strolling around looking for Casey, and the shadow of the monstrous form in the walls. Marybeth delivers a speech which ties the elements of the movie together. It is about the "world" she came from and its promises of "paradise" for lost and lonely humans, trapped in high-school "hell".

The character of Miss Burke precedes Marybeth in the same line, revealing her hidden sexuality only after being infected and turned into a monster. The scene of her detached, tentacled head in particular echoes the Freudian Medusa head. The monstrous feminine is therefore used in the film to reflect the teenage characters entering adult world, where they are forced to "come to terms with female sexuality and overcome their fear of its 'monstrous' aspects in order to become fully functioning adults". Casey, the male character closest to his softer, feminine side, is the final hero of the film.

=== Accolades ===
The film was nominated for a total of eight awards, including an ALMA Award for director Robert Rodriguez, 2 Saturn Awards, 2 Blockbuster Entertainment Awards and 3 Teen Choice Awards, but did not win any.

Year	Award	Category	Work	Result
1999	ALMA Award	Outstanding Latino Director of a Feature Film	Robert Rodriguez	Nominated
1999	Saturn Award	Best Horror Film	The Faculty	Nominated
1999	Saturn Award	Best Performance by a Younger Actor/Actress	Josh Hartnett	Nominated
1999	Blockbuster Entertainment Award	Favorite Actor – Horror	Elijah Wood	Nominated
1999	Blockbuster Entertainment Award	Favorite Female Newcomer	Clea DuVall	Nominated
1999	Teen Choice Award	Choice Movie: Breakout Star	Clea DuVall	Nominated
1999	Teen Choice Award	Choice Movie: Disgusting Scene	Laura Harris	Nominated
1999	Teen Choice Award	Choice Movie: Soundtrack	The Faculty: Music from the Dimension Motion Picture	Nominated

== Remake ==
In January 2025, it was reported that a script for a remake was in the works by Companion (2025) writer-director Drew Hancock. Rodriguez is set to produce, along with Miramax (under their new beIN/Paramount co-ownership) and BoulderLight Pictures.

== Sources ==
- Ferrimond, Katherine (2017). The Contemporary Femme Fatale: Gender, Genre and American Cinema. Taylor & Francis. ISBN 9781317208181.
- Packer, Sharon; Pennington, Jody (2014). A History of Evil in Popular Culture: What Hannibal Lecter, Stephen King, and Vampires Reveal About America [2 volumes]: What Hannibal Lecter, Stephen King, and Vampires Reveal about America. ABC-CLIO. ISBN 9780313397714.
- Sherman, Fraser A. (2014). Screen Enemies of the American Way: Political Paranoia About Nazis, Communists, Saboteurs, Terrorists and Body Snatching Aliens in Film and Television. McFarland. ISBN 9780786462254.
- West, Alexandra (2018). The 1990s Teen Horror Cycle: Final Girls and a New Hollywood Formula. McFarland. ISBN 9781476631288.
