= D'You Know What I Mean? =

1997 single by Oasis

Single by Oasis

from the album Be Here Now
- B-side: "Stay Young"; "Angel Child" (demo); "'Heroes'"
- Released: 7 July 1997
- Genre: Britpop; rock
- Length: 7:42 (album version); 7:22 (single version)
- Label: Creation
- Songwriter: Noel Gallagher
- Producers: Owen Morris; Noel Gallagher

Oasis singles chronology
"Champagne Supernova" (1996)	"D'You Know What I Mean?" (1997)	"Stand by Me" (1997)

Music video
- "D'You Know What I Mean?" on YouTube

Be Here Now track listing
- 12 tracks: 1. "D'You Know What I Mean?"; 2. "My Big Mouth"; 3. "Magic Pie"; 4. "Stand by Me"; 5. "I Hope, I Think, I Know"; 6. "The Girl in the Dirty Shirt"; 7. "Fade In-Out"; 8. "Don't Go Away"; 9. "Be Here Now"; 10. "All Around the World"; 11. "It's Gettin' Better (Man!!)"; 12. "All Around the World (Reprise)"

"D'You Know What I Mean?" is a song by English rock band Oasis. Written by Noel Gallagher, it was released on 7 July 1997 as the first single from their third album, Be Here Now (1997).

The song reached number one on the UK Singles Chart, the third Oasis song to do so. The single also claimed the number-one position in Finland, Ireland, and Spain, and it reached the top five in Italy, New Zealand, Norway, and Sweden. In the United Kingdom, it sold 162,000 copies during its first day of release and 370,000 copies by the end of the week. It has sold 745,000 copies in the UK, achieving platinum status in the process, and it was the 12th-biggest-selling single of 1997 there. In October 2011, NME placed it at number 77 on its list "150 Best Tracks of the Past 15 Years".

An edited, remixed and remastered version of the song was released on 14 October 2016 entitled "D'You Know What I Mean? (NG's 2016 Rethink)". The reissue formed part of the wider rerelease of the Be Here Now album to celebrate its 20th anniversary. This new version was intended to be part of a remix of the entire album, but Noel Gallagher reportedly lost interest in the project and stopped after the first track.

== B-sides ==
One of the B-sides, "Stay Young", has become a popular Oasis song, so much so that fans voted it onto the B-sides collection The Masterplan – one of only two B-sides from the Be Here Now period which made the album, although according to Noel, this is only because Liam requested the song be put on the album, as he is said to be a fan of it. The song was originally intended to be the "Digsy's Dinner" of Be Here Now (the lighthearted novelty track, such as "Digsy's Dinner" on Definitely Maybe and "She's Electric" on (What's the Story) Morning Glory?), until Noel set it aside in favour of "Magic Pie". Gallagher claims not to be particularly fond of the track. On 28 October 1998, "Stay Young" was released as a CD single in its own right by Epic Records Japan. One of the other B-sides is a cover of David Bowie's song "Heroes".

== Interview ==
In a 1997 interview promoting Be Here Now, Noel Gallagher had the following to say about the first single: "I was going to make up some profound statement in the chorus but I couldn't come up with anything that fitted. Then I just thought 'All my people right here, right now, d'you know what I mean? Yeah, yeah.' Very vague, very ambiguous, that'll do. Look in the mirror and wink while you're singing it and it's quite saucy. And I fucking love that line, 'Coming in a mess, going out in style'. We were a bunch of scruffs from Manchester and we're going out in a Rolls-Royce." In another 1997 interview, this time on BBC, Noel Gallagher said: "I can't believe I wrote it, it's going to blow people away."

"The morse code in the background was inspired by Strawberry Fairy by Tony Newley. We got hold of a code book and tried to tap out 'Bugger All' to follow that line 'Don't look back cos you know what you might see'. But if anyone can tell me what we really said, please let me know. Profound lagerisms..."

In an interview with the BBC for their documentary Seven Ages of Rock, Gallagher said of the song, "It's eight and a half minutes, the first single, the drums haven't fuckin' come in for two minutes—it's all feedback!" He also said that he expected someone to ask them to edit the introduction to the song down, but such was their status in Britain, nobody did. They even performed the song on Top of the Pops, omitting most of the lengthy introduction.

The lyrics reference two Beatles songs—"The Fool on the Hill" and "I Feel Fine"—as well as New Vaudeville Band albums and Bob Dylan's "Blood on the Tracks".

== Packaging ==
The single cover photograph, by Michael Spencer Jones and directed by Brian Cannon of Microdot, was taken in front of the 'Blind Steps', a staircase in Wigan so called because they run past the Blind Workshop, which can be seen to the left of the shot. The steps can still be found on Darlington Street. The shoot was shrouded in secrecy to protect mass media coverage, but newspaper The Wigan Evening Post got exclusive rights to cover the event and subsequently sold the photos to the Daily Mirror. At a lunchtime break, the band and sleeve designer Brian Cannon enjoyed a pint of beer in the nearby Crispin Arms pub by Birkett Bank.

== Critical reception ==
British magazine Music Week rated "D'You Know What I Mean?" five out of five, picking it as Single of the Week. They called the song "typically anthemic and catchy, but with a fuller, more layered production than they've previously offered. A number one, possibly the biggest of the year." NME also made it Single of the Week, with Johnny Cigarettes writing that "it's an exciting sound because it shows that Noel Gallagher is not entirely content to rest on his laurens and is prepared to experiment in order to achieve his grand vision."

In 2024, Rolling Stone ranked it the 13th best Oasis song, saying "While it may lack the melody of a 'Wonderwall', the anthem makes up for it with menace and swagger."

== Music video ==
The accompanying music video for "D'You Know What I Mean?", directed by Dom and Nic, is set in an apparently post-apocalyptic world and shows the band playing as a growing number of military helicopters fly overhead. Several of the helicopters land while a crowd gathers to watch the band play and throw coloured smoke grenades. At the end, the band members board one of the helicopters and fly away.

The video story's setting is unclear. It was filmed on location at Beckton Gas Works in London, which has also been used as a filming location by the Smiths and Stanley Kubrick among others. The phrases "Do you know what I mean?" and "Be here now" can be seen painted in Czech on one of the surrounding buildings. Liam Gallagher wears a snorkel parka and sports a unique pair of tailor-made sunglasses.

The helicopters used were British Army Westland Lynx AH.7s. One is an AH.7(DAS) variant, notable for the distinctive ALQ-144 (disco ball) infra-red jammer under the tail. The other is a straight AH.7, albeit with a TOW antitank missile sight mounted over the left-hand front seat. Although only two helicopters were used, post-production techniques such as split screen editing, and clever camera angling produced the numerous helicopters seen in the video.

The band was later accused of hypocrisy for hiring the helicopters for the video. In 2002, the band had forced the British Army to pull a recruiting video that used "Morning Glory" as background music, stating their vehement opposition to war and the military.

== Track listings ==
All songs were written by Noel Gallagher except where noted.

- UK CD single
1. "D'You Know What I Mean?"
2. "Stay Young"
3. "Angel Child" (demo)
4. "'Heroes'" (David Bowie, Brian Eno)
- UK 7-inch and cassette single
1. "D'You Know What I Mean?"
2. "Stay Young"
- UK 12-inch single

A1. "D'You Know What I Mean?"
B1. "Stay Young"
B2. "Angel Child" (demo)

== Personnel ==
Oasis

- Liam Gallagher – lead vocals, tambourine
- Noel Gallagher – lead guitar, acoustic guitar, backing vocals, string arrangements
- Paul "Bonehead" Arthurs – rhythm guitar
- Paul "Guigsy" McGuigan – bass
- Alan White – drums

Additional musicians

- Mark Coyle – backwards guitar

== Charts ==
=== Weekly charts ===
Chart (1997)	Peak position
Australia (ARIA)	16
Austria (Ö3 Austria Top 40)	38
Belgium (Ultratop 50 Flanders)	32
Belgium (Ultratop 50 Wallonia)	25
Canada Singles Sales (The Record)	3
Canada Contemporary Hit Radio (The Record)	39
Canada Top Singles (RPM)	28
Canada Rock/Alternative (RPM)	1
Denmark (IFPI)	6
Europe (Eurochart Hot 100)	6
Finland (Suomen virallinen lista)	1
France (SNEP)	37
Germany (GfK)	27
Iceland (Íslenski Listinn Topp 40)	9
Ireland (IRMA)	1
Israel (IBA)	13
Italy (Musica e dischi)	3
Italy Airplay (Music & Media)	1
Netherlands (Dutch Top 40)	25
Netherlands (Single Top 100)	31
New Zealand (Recorded Music NZ)	4
Norway (VG-lista)	3
Scottish Singles Sales (Official Charts)	1
Spain (AFYVE)	1
Sweden (Sverigetopplistan)	2
Switzerland (Schweizer Hitparade)	20
UK Singles (Official Charts)	1
UK Indie (Music Week)	1
US Radio Songs (Billboard)	49
US Alternative Airplay (Billboard)	4
US Mainstream Rock (Billboard)	36

=== Year-end charts ===
Chart (1997)	Position
Canada Top Singles (RPM)	82
Canada Rock/Alternative (RPM)	13
Europe (Eurochart Hot 100)	73
Iceland (Íslenski Listinn Topp 40)	70
Sweden (Topplistan)	42
UK Singles (OCC)	12
US Modern Rock Tracks (Billboard)	39

== Certifications ==
Region	Certification	Certified units/sales
New Zealand (RMNZ)	Gold	5,000^{*}
Norway (IFPI Norway)	Gold	
Sweden (GLF)	Gold	15,000^{^}
United Kingdom (BPI)	Platinum	745,000
^{*} Sales figures based on certification alone.^{^} Shipments figures based on certification alone.

== Release history ==
Region	Date	Format(s)	Label(s)	Ref(s).
Japan	7 July 1997	CD	Epic	
United Kingdom	7 July 1997	7-inch vinyl; CD; cassette	Creation	
United States	8 July 1997	Contemporary hit radio	Epic	
