= Haunting Me (Stabbing Westward song) =

Single by Stabbing Westward

from the album Darkest Days and The Faculty Original Motion Picture Soundtrack
- Released: 1999
- Recorded: 1997 at Eldorado Studios and NRG Recording Studios, North Hollywood
- Genre: Alternative metal; industrial metal
- Length: 3:36
- Label: Columbia
- Songwriters: Mark Eliopulos; Walter Flakus; Christopher Hall; Andy Kubiszewski; Jim Sellers
- Producers: Stabbing Westward; Dave Jerden; Ulrich Wild

Stabbing Westward singles chronology
"Save Yourself" (1998)	"Haunting Me" (1999)	"So Far Away" (2001)

Professional ratings
Review scores
Source	Rating
AllMusic	1.5/5 stars

"Haunting Me" is a song by American industrial rock band Stabbing Westward. The song was released as the third and final single from the 1998 album Darkest Days. The song was featured in the 1998 film The Faculty.

== Track listing ==
No.	Title	Length
1.	"Haunting Me" (Clean Version)	3:36
2.	"Haunting Me" (Album Version)	3:36
3.	"Haunting Me" (Callout Hook #1)	0:10
4.	"Haunting Me" (Callout Hook #2)	0:05
Total length:		7:27

== Charts ==
Chart	Peak position
US Modern Rock Tracks (Billboard)	34
US Mainstream Rock Tracks (Billboard)	19

== Personnel ==
- Christopher Hall – vocals
- Marcus Eliopulos – guitar
- Jim Sellers – bass
- Walter Flakus – keyboards
- Andy Kubiszewski – drums
