= Save Yourself (True Blood) =

- True Blood episode
- Episode no.: Season 5 Episode 12
- Directed by: Michael Lehmann
- Written by: Alan Ball
- Production code: 512
- Original air date: August 26, 2012
- Running time: 50 minutes

Episode chronology
← Previous "Sunset"	Next → "Who Are You, Really?"
- True Blood (season 5)

"Save Yourself" is the twelfth and final episode of HBO's fifth season of the Vampire TV series True Blood, while the 60th episode overall. The episode focuses on Eric's last attempt at trying to rid Bill of Lilith's madness as well as planning his escape with Nora; Sookie and the faeries fight against Steve Newlin and Russell Edgington. The season is loosely based on The Sookie Stackhouse Series' fifth book Dead as a Doornail, although much more of the book and its successors are incorporated than in previous seasons. The episode is preceded by Sunset and is followed by the season 6^{1} premiere episode. The episode has mostly had good reviews, surpassing its predecessors in viewers, except for Turn, Turn, Turn! which remains with the highest number of viewers, with 5.20.

== Plot ==
After the fae club is left vulnerable, leaving Russell to feed on them at will, the faeries start using their magic, which makes him more hungry. Sookie and the others are then saved by Eric, who kills Russell.

Sookie checks on Jason, who has been zapped by faerie magic and has visions of his parents telling him to hate vampires, which he later begins to do. Sookie's faerie scent strongly tempts Nora. Eric intervenes, forcing Nora to promise to not eat Sookie. Eric then asks for Sookie's help in rescuing Bill and defeating the Vampire Authority and convinces Sookie, Tara, and Jason to help.

Bill has gone more into darkness, going so far as to control the Authority and injure Jessica and put her in a cage.

After much reconnaissance Sam finds Luna Garza's daughter Emma and comes up with an escape plan. Luna transforms into Steve Newlin and gathers Emma, still in wolf cub form from the cage. Steve NewLuna walks out of the compound and is nearly out before she is stopped by an angry Rosalyn Harris. Rosalyn demands that Steve go on live television to control the damage caused by his and Russell's Greek night. Sam shapeshifts into a housefly and follows Rosalyn, Steve NewLuna and Emma to the studio. Luna loses control during the interview and shifts back into herself on live TV. She outs the Authority's plan for the planet before Rosalyn is able to cut the feed by knocking over the camera. Sam flies into Rosalyn's mouth and shifts back into human form exploding and killing Rosalyn.

Meanwhile, Alcide fights J.D. in a rematch and is able to defeat and kill J.D. with the help of V given to him by his father. He proclaims himself pack master, declares new rules of conduct and orders any non-followers to leave.

Andy decides to tell Holly about his pregnant faerie "girlfriend" and just as he does she goes into labor and delivers 4 baby girls on the Merlotte's pool table with Holly acting a nursemaid. Once the babies are delivered their mother leaves them with Andy, noting his obligation as part of the light contract that he must ensure at least half of the children reach adulthood, Andy asks Holly if she could help him take care of the kids which she agrees to do.

After successfully entering the Authority, Jason, Tara, Nora and Eric kill many guards. Sookie and Tara then rescue Pam and Jessica from the cages, and Pam and Tara share a kiss^{3}. Once the entire group has regrouped at the elevator Jessica reveals her strong feelings for Jason, who rejects her due to his visions and new vampire hate. Sookie and Eric send the group out of the compound while they return to try and retrieve Bill Compton.

Salome drinks from the vial containing Lilith's blood only to discover that Bill has tricked her into drinking blood laced with silver. Bill then stakes Salome who admits to herself of not being worthy. After she dies, Bill is about to drink the true Lilith blood but is stopped by Eric and Sookie. Sookie and Eric try to reason with Bill but Bill dismisses Eric and suggests to Sookie he faked his feelings for her and claiming to have planned everything out to get to Lillth’s blood, leaving Sookie to believe he’s in denial, Bill reminds her of the first night they met, when he told her about how vampires usually turn on the people they love the most. Bill drinks the Lilith blood, he grins, but is killed within seconds by the blood^{4}. Sookie starts crying. They believe Bill to be dead but he reforms in the style of Lilith. Eric shouts "RUN!" at Sookie and they both run.

== Critical reception ==
Critical response has been mixed to positive.

=== Viewers ===
Save Yourself is the second highest viewed episode of the season with 5.05 million viewers. This puts it behind only the season premiere, Turn! Turn! Turn!, which drew 5.20 million viewers.

== Season Six ==
Shortly before the fifth season's release, it was reported that HBO had renewed True Blood for a sixth season. The sixth season was later revealed to be based on the sixth book in the series, Definitely Dead, and will continue the fifth season's events. Filming was reported to begin late 2012, but was postponed after news that Anna Paquin was pregnant.^{5} Filming was later rumored to begin early 2013. This was later officially confirmed towards the fifth season's finale. The season will premiere during the summer of 2013, late June. It is implied that the sixth season will feature Warlow and 'Billith'^{2} while going on with the season's events. It was revealed that this season would be two episodes shorter than the usual 12 episodes (there will only be 10 episodes in all). This was later revealed to be due to Paquin's pregnancy.

== Notes ==
1. Before the fifth season aired on TV, it was announced that True Blood had been renewed for a sixth season. While season six presumably continues the events of the fifth season, while being based on Definitely Dead, though after the opening of the season finale it is possible a Warlow subplot might be created in the sixth season.
2. After the fifth-season finale, Save Yourself, many fans and others have cited and nicknamed Bill, whom in the episode reforms like Lilith, "Billith" which is being commonly used for recaps etc.
3. While it is never seen or shown before, in this episode, Pam and Tara seem to have strong feelings for each other, while Pam is also seen to have feelings for Eric, implying, like in the novels, she is bisexual.
4. Bill's death was rumored before the season's release, though this was later denied true, however, it is assumed Alan Ball and the novels' author had planned this death, though it was stated Ball "accidentally let it slip." However it may be, it was never stated or revealed that Bill would become 'Billith'.
5. Actress, Anna Paquin later revealed to the public she was pregnant with husband and co-star, Stephen Moyer, due to this season six filming was postponed until February, 2013 so the season could be released during the summer.
