= Primrose Hill set =

Nickname for group of British celebrities

The Primrose Hill set is a name applied to a group of celebrities in the 1990s, who were based in Primrose Hill, near Camden Town in North London, and had, in the words of Andrew Johnson writing in The Independent in 2010, a reputation for "having a whale of a time with drink, drugs and bed-hopping".

== History ==
The core members of the group had lived close to each other in the Primrose Hill area of north London, as well as in neighbouring Belsize Park and Hampstead; however, the social focus for the group was really the Notting Hill area, several miles away in west London. The term grew in use in the British media to identify the group as socially homogeneous and also as a convenient label, similar to the Young British Artists and Britpop labels of the same period. Supernova Heights, Noel Gallagher's Steele's Road home, was associated with the Primrose Hill set, and gained a reputation as a place of non-stop parties, and excess.

Many of the group's members appeared with each other in film and television productions in the mid-nineties, and later cast each other in their own productions. The films Final Cut and Love, Honour and Obey both comprised several 'Primrose Hill set' members, although these films were neither critical nor commercial successes. Several members of the 'set' formed production company Natural Nylon in 1997. This went on to produce several films, notably David Cronenberg's eXistenZ in 1999, Nora in 2000, Owning Mahowny and To Kill a King in 2003, and Sky Captain and the World of Tomorrow in 2004, the final film production of the company. While some of the Natural Nylon films received good notices, there were no notable box office successes. The company enjoyed some success with theatrical productions, co-producing an acclaimed adaptation of Dr Faustus at the Young Vic in 2002.

The 'set' began to break up in 2003, with the acrimonious break up of the marriage of key members Jude Law and Sadie Frost. With the 'set' splintered, Natural Nylon then also folded in 2003. The demise of Natural Nylon, and with collaborations between the 'set' falling off, the term 'Primrose Hill set' went into decline, to be revived from around 2017 on, under headlines of the 'new Primrose Hill set', featuring offspring of the original 'set'.

== Members ==
=== Core members ===
- Sadie Frost
- Jude Law
- Kate Moss
- Johnny Depp
- Liam Gallagher
- Noel Gallagher
- Danny Goffey
- Rhys Ifans
- Patsy Kensit
- Jonny Lee Miller
- Ewan McGregor
- Sienna Miller
- Dani Behr

=== Other members ===
- Donna Air
- Chris Martin
- Gwyneth Paltrow
- Pearl Lowe
- Meg Mathews
- Jeremy Crawford
- Nellee Hooper
- Lisa Moorish
- Holly Davidson
- Sean Pertwee
- Gavin Rossdale
- Davinia Taylor
- Annabelle Neilson
