= Sean Rowley =

British disc jockey on BBC Radio Kent

Sean Rowley is a British disc jockey and television and radio presenter.

He started his DJ career in the mid-1990s touring with the likes of Paul Weller and Oasis. He came up with a concept for the radio show All Back to Mine, which saw him delve into the record collections of music loving celebrities. Guests included the Chemical Brothers, Fatboy Slim, Damon Albarn and Paul Weller. The first show was recorded at Supernova Heights with Noel Gallagher and broadcast on BBC Radio 1 on Christmas Day 1997.

All Back to Mine transferred to television and was broadcast on Channel 4 in 1998. It ran for two series (9 episodes) with Rowley presenting and guests including Lemmy from Motörhead, Gil Scott Heron, Frankie Knuckles, Moby and James Dean Bradfield from Manic Street Preachers.

Rowley also presented the 13 part BBC TV series Head to Toe, in 2000, a history of modern menswear.

By 2001, Rowley was hosting a weekly show on BBC Radio London which ran for eight years. In 2009, the show moved to BBC Kent, where in 2012 he won the silver Sony Radio Academy Award for Music Broadcaster of the Year.

Rowley devised the Guilty Pleasures concept as a slot on his former BBC London radio show, to attempt to 'reclaim' songs that are viewed as "slightly shameful to love". His club Guilty Pleasures took place at KOKO in Camden Town, and has spawned five compilation albums, a radio show on BBC London 94.9, and a television show on ITV1 hosted by Fearne Cotton on which established performers including Sophie Ellis-Bextor, Craig David, Supergrass and KT Tunstall performed cover versions of Guilty Pleasures favourites.

Under the banner of the Guilty Pleasures brand, Rowley has hosted & DJ’d at events around the world and across many major UK festivals, headlining stages at Glastonbury, Latitude, The Big Chill and Bestival.

In 2016, Rowley co-founded the Mighty Hoopla festival, which saw Guilty Pleasures join forces with like minded pop brands & host a weekender event at Butlins in Bognor Regis. This grew into a one day festival in Victoria Park, London in 2017 and has now upgraded to two days in Brockwell Park, South London. Headline acts have included Years & Years, TLC, Chaka Khan, En Vogue and Sugababes in 2022.

Rowley appears on the cover of the Oasis album (What's the Story) Morning Glory?.
