= The Same Old Blues =

Studio album by Proud Mary
- Released: June 18, 2001
- Recorded: November 2000
- Studio: Wheeler End Studios
- Genre: Rock
- Label: Sour Mash
- Producers: Noel Gallagher, Gem Archer

Proud Mary chronology
The Same Old Blues (2001)	Love and Light (2004)

The Same Old Blues is the debut album from UK rock group Proud Mary. The album was recorded at Wheeler End Studios in November 2000 over a period of 7 days and released on Noel Gallagher's Sour Mash label. The album was produced by Noel Gallagher assisted by Gem Archer, engineered by Stan Kybert and mixed by Mark "Spike" Stent at Olympic Studios in London. The album was released in June, 2001 and reached #94 on the UK album charts.

== Track listing ==
1. "Give a Little Love"
2. "Very Best Friend"
3. "Dont it all Look Ugly"
4. "All Good Things"
5. "Somewhere Down the Line"
6. "Time on Our Hands"
7. "Just for You"
8. "Salt of the Earth" (Mick Jagger, Keith Richards)
9. "Same Old Blues"

== Personnel ==
- Greg Griffin – vocals
- Paul Newsome – guitars, vocals, harmonica
- Adam Gray – guitars, pedal steel
- Noel Gallagher – bass, guitars, vocals, percussion
- Terry Kirkbride – drums, vocals, percussion
- Mikey Rowe – piano, organ
- Andy Bell – guitar
- Gem Archer – guitar
