= Salt of the Earth (song) =

Song by the Rolling Stones

from the album Beggars Banquet
- Released: 6 December 1968
- Recorded: May 1968
- Genre: Country blues; country rock; gospel
- Length: 4:47
- Label: Decca/ABKCO
- Songwriter: Jagger/Richards
- Producer: Jimmy Miller

"Salt of the Earth" is the final song from English rock band the Rolling Stones album Beggars Banquet (1968). Written by Mick Jagger and Keith Richards, the song includes an opening lead vocal by Richards. It is the second official track by the group to feature him on lead vocal (the first being "Something Happened to Me Yesterday" from Between the Buttons).

== Composition and lyrics ==
The song was reportedly inspired by John Lennon, with Jagger attempting to write a working class anthem. The lyrics were written primarily by Jagger and salute the working class:

Say a prayer for the common foot soldier
Spare a thought for his back breaking work
Say a prayer for his wife and his children
Who burn the fires and who still till the earth

In a twice-repeated stanza, the singer professes a distance from his subject that seemingly belies the sentiment of the verses:

And when I search a faceless crowd
A swirling mass of grey and black and white
They don't look real to me
In fact, they look so strange

The song uses a quote that refers to a passage in the Bible where Jesus is trying to encourage people to give the best of themselves

You are the salt of the earth; but if the salt loses its savour, how shall it be seasoned ? It is then good for nothing but to be thrown out and trampled underfoot by men – Matthew 5:13

"Salt of the Earth" features the acoustic work of Richards, typical of most songs from Beggars Banquet. Richards also performs the slide guitar throughout the song (Brian Jones, who often played slide on previous songs, was absent from these sessions). While some songs from Beggars Banquet were recorded by Jagger and Richards using a personal tape recorder, "Salt of the Earth" was recorded at London's Olympic Sound Studios in May 1968.

Featuring on the song are the Los Angeles Watts Street Gospel Choir and a piano performance by Nicky Hopkins. These additions, and their prominence near the end of the song, are further developed on their next album Let It Bleed's closing song, "You Can't Always Get What You Want".

== Critical reception ==
Jim Beviglia ranked "Salt of the Earth" the 25th best Rolling Stones song in Counting Down the Rolling Stones: Their 100 Finest Songs. Paste called it "a simple ode to the proletariat" and ranked it 37th in its Top 50 Rolling Stones songs. Rolling Stone ranked it 45th in its countdown of the band's top 100 songs, praising Richards' vocals and "gospel reverie".

In his 1969 ballot for Jazz & Pop magazine's annual critics poll, Robert Christgau ranked "Salt of the Earth" as the best pop song of the year.

Classic Rock History critic Matthew Pollard rated it as the Rolling Stones' 6th best deep cut, noting that "It starts as a tinkling acoustic composition before shifting into an almost gospel-like intensity."

== Cover versions ==
- 1969: Rotary Connection on their album, Songs.
- 1970: Jamaican reggae band the Cables as a single, released on Trojan Records in the UK.
- 1971: Dandy Livingstone as a single, also on Trojan.
- 1971: Joan Baez on the studio album, Blessed Are... Baez included the song in her set during her October 2011 performance for Occupy Wall Street protesters in Manhattan.
- 1975: Judy Collins on the studio album, Judith.
- 1984: Johnny Adams soul version on his album From the Heart (1984).
- 2001: Proud Mary on the studio album, The Same Old Blues
- 2010: Bettye LaVette on her 2010 album, Interpretations: The British Songbook.

== Personnel ==
- Mick Jagger – vocals
- Keith Richards – acoustic guitar, slide guitar, vocals
- Bill Wyman – bass guitar
- Charlie Watts – drums
- Nicky Hopkins – piano
- Watts Street Gospel Choir – background vocals

== Bibliography ==
- Stephen, Davis. Watch You Bleed: The Saga of Guns N' Roses. New York: Penguin Group, 2008.
