= Terry Kirkbride =

English drummer

- Genres: Rock, Britpop
- Occupation(s): Drummer, percussionist, singer songwriter
- Instrument(s): Drums, percussion, vocals
- Years active: 1988–present

Terry Kirkbride is an English drummer. He is known for being a former member of Proud Mary and for playing in the Oasis frontman Noel Gallagher's live band (before the High Flying Birds). He also played for Oasis occasionally, and has performed live and in studio for many artists including Paul Weller, The Who's Roger Daltrey, The Verve's Richard Ashcroft, and Ambershades.

Kirkbride started writing his own songs with NaoKo TakaHashi in 2009 and formed a band, The Marbles Jackson.

== Discography ==
=== With The Sandkings ===
- Welcome to England (1992) – London Records

=== With Proud Mary ===
- The Same Old Blues (2001) – Sour Mash

=== With Oasis ===
- Don't Believe the Truth (2005) – Big Brother Recordings (Drums on "Mucky Fingers")
- Goal!: Music from the Motion Picture (2006) – Big Brother Recordings (Drums on "Who Put the Weight of the World On My Shoulders?" and "Cast No Shadow")

=== With Noel Gallagher (and Gem Archer) ===
- Sitting Here in Silence (2006)
- The Dreams We Have as Children (Live for Teenage Cancer Trust) (2007) – Big Brother Recordings

=== With Ambershades ===
- Clap Clap Clap (2003) (single)
