= Bradley Adams (disambiguation) =

Brad(ley) Adams may refer to:

- Brad Adams, American human rights activist
- Bradley Adams, British film producer
- Brad Adams (racing driver) in 2010 SCCA Pro Racing World Challenge season

== See also ==
- Peter Bradley Adams
