= Meg Mathews =

English columnist (born 1966)

- Born: 14 March 1966 (age 60); Guernsey, Channel Islands
- Occupations: Columnist, activist, businesswoman
- Years active: 1984–present
- Spouse: Noel Gallagher (m. 1997; div. 2001)
- Partner: Peter Sidell (2008–2010)
- Children: Anaïs Gallagher

Meg Mathews (born 14 March 1966) is an English columnist, activist and businesswoman. She became known through her former marriage to the musician Noel Gallagher. She is the mother of the model and photographer Anaïs Gallagher.

== Early life ==
Meg Mathews was born in Guernsey, Channel Islands, on 14 March 1966, the only child of Stanley Mathews, a builder, and his wife, Christine, a secretary. The family emigrated when she was nine years old to South Africa, where she grew up on a winery outside Stellenbosch in the Western Cape.

Mathews attended Sibford School, a Quaker boarding school, from the age of 12, where her friends included Guy Ritchie.

== Career ==
Mathews started her career as a cashier in a branch of the high-end clothes shop Joseph. She was subsequently promoted to manager. She founded her own fashion PR company at the age of 21. She rose to fame in the Britpop scene while working in music management. She has also worked as an interior designer.

Mathews appeared on the thirteenth episode in the final series of the ITV cookery reality show Hell's Kitchen in 2009.

Mathews appeared on the Channel 4 entertainment programme Time Crashers in 2015. The programme, presented by Tony Robinson and Cassie Newland, sees Mathews, with nine other celebrities, transported to different historical settings where they experience the life of the 'lower' classes and are set tasks relating to that era.

Mathews launched MegsMenopause, a platform dedicated to breaking the stigma around the menopause, in 2018.

Mathews wrote her first book, The New Hot: Taking on the Menopause with Attitude and Style (ISBN 9780593129364), which was published by Ebury Publishing in October 2020.

== Personal life ==
Mathews married the musician Noel Gallagher in a secret ceremony at the Little Church of the West, the oldest wedding chapel on the Las Vegas Strip, on 5 June 1997. Her brother-in-law was the singer and songwriter Liam Gallagher. The pair met in 1994 through her roommate, the MTV presenter Rebecca de Ruvo, whom Gallagher was dating at the time and whom he left for Mathews. They lived at Supernova Heights on Steele's Road in Belsize Park. Their only child, a daughter, Anaïs Gallagher, was born at Portland Hospital in Westminster, Greater London, on 27 January 2000. She named their daughter after the writer Anaïs Nin. The couple separated in September 2000 and divorced on 19 January 2001, after three-and-a-half years of marriage, on the grounds of Gallagher's adultery with the Scottish publicist Sara MacDonald, whom Gallagher met at the Ibiza nightclub Space in June 2000. After their divorce was finalised, Gallagher said that he had never actually been unfaithful and had only said he had cheated on Mathews to speed up the divorce process.

Mathews was a member of the Primrose Hill set. Her daughter is considered to be a member of the next generation Primrose Hill set.

Mathews announced her engagement to Peter Sidell, who is the owner of Knightsbridge menswear shop The Library and an arts professor at the Royal College of Art, in May 2009, after a six-month relationship. He proposed on top of the Empire State Building in Manhattan, New York City. She was planning their wedding for 2010. The couple separated in November 2010.

Mathews lives in Newquay, Cornwall.

On 7 July 2023, Mathews was arrested on charges of drink-driving after she crashed her yellow Jeep Wrangler into a parked car following a book signing in Nansledan. She was breathalyzed at the scene of the crash, which caused minor damage, and found to be over the legal limit. She appeared before Cornwall Magistrates' Court in Bodmin, where she pleaded guilty to a charge of driving a motor vehicle with an alcohol level above the limit. She was banned from driving for 20 months, fined £440, and ordered to pay a £176 surcharge and £85 prosecution costs.

== Filmography ==
Year	Title	Notes
1996	Oasis: Mad for It!	2 episodes
1998	Omnibus	Episode: "Alan McGee: The Man Who Discovered Oasis"
2002	The Art Show	Episode: "Revolt in Fashion"
2007	Deadline	Episode: "Episode #1.2"
2007	The Wright Stuff	Episode: "14/05/2007"
2009	Hell's Kitchen	Episode: "Episode #4.13"
2015	Time Crashers	6 episodes
2018	Jeremy Vine	Episode: "Episode #1.43"

== Bibliography ==
- Mathews, Meg (2020). The New Hot: Taking on the Menopause with Attitude and Style. Ebury Publishing. ISBN 9780593129364.
