= NaoKo TakaHashi =

Japanese-British artist

NaoKo TakaHashi (高橋 尚子, born 1973 in Niigata, Japan) is a London-based artist. Her works include performances and installations highlighting the ambiguities and confusions of national and individual identities played out through language, focusing on dislocation, re-location and representation in a multi-cultural, multi-lingual society.

Solo exhibitions include Stubbornly Persistent Illusion Chapter 1: Red Planet and An Exploration of Perforated Space in Four Segments of Words both at IMT Gallery, London, in 2013 and 2010 respectively, and A Tale of Two States at the Al Ma’mal Foundation for Contemporary Art, Jerusalem and the Al-Kahf Gallery, International Centre of Bethlehem, Palestine between 2008 and 2009.

Major group exhibitions include the 2012 triennial of contemporary art at the Palais de Tokyo, the Thessaloniki Biennale of Contemporary Art and the 2009 Marrakech Biennale.

Her film, Good Morning At Night (2005), has been shown at Nikolaj Copenhagen Contemporary Art Centre and the 24th Uppsala International Short Film Festival. In 2001, whilst studying at the Slade School of Fine Art, she was shortlisted for the Beck's Futures Student Film & Video Awards. In 2007, Book Works published her experimental text Not So Too Much of Much of Everything. In 2011, she worked on a musical project with Terry Kirkbride called the Marbles Jackson.
