= Nora (2000 film) =

- Theatrical release poster
- Directed by: Pat Murphy
- Written by: Gerard Stembridge; Pat Murphy
- Produced by: Bradley Adams; Damon Bryant; Tracey Seaward
- Starring: Susan Lynch; Ewan McGregor
- Cinematography: Jean-François Robin
- Edited by: Pia Di Ciaula
- Music by: Stanislas Syrewicz
- Production company: Natural Nylon
- Distributed by: Advanced (Germany); Momentum Pictures (UK)
- Release dates: April 21, 2000 (Ireland); May 19, 2000 (United Kingdom)
- Running time: 106 minutes
- Countries: Germany; Italy; Ireland; United Kingdom
- Language: English
- Box office: $15,120

Nora is a 2000 film directed by Pat Murphy about Nora Barnacle and her husband, Irish author James Joyce. It stars Ewan McGregor as Joyce and Susan Lynch in the title role.

== Plot ==
In Dublin, 1904, James Joyce walks down Nassau Street and meets Nora Barnacle, a young woman from Galway. Joyce, immediately in love, offers to 'show her the city'. Nora coldly states that she has to work. The film then proceeds to examine the relationship between the two.

== Cast ==
Actor	Role
Susan Lynch	Nora Barnacle
Ewan McGregor	James Joyce
Andrew Scott	Michael Bodkin
Peter McDonald	Stanislaus Joyce
Roberto Citran	Roberto Prezioso
Vinnie McCabe	Uncle Tommy
Veronica Duffy	Annie Barnacle
Pauline McLynn	Miss Kennedy
Aedin Moloney	Eva Joyce

=== Reception ===
Nora received an extremely limited release, in 8 cinemas, from May 4 to the 6th, 2000. It grossed only $15,120.

== Awards ==
=== Won ===
- Cherbourg-Octeville Festival of Irish & British Film (2000): Best Actress - Susan Lynch
- Irish Film and Television Awards (2000): IFTA Award Best Actress - Susan Lynch

=== Nominated ===
- Irish Film and Television Awards (2000): IFTA Award Best Actor - Ewan McGregor
- Cherbourg-Octeville Festival of Irish & British Film (2000): Best Film - Pat Murphy
- Irish Film and Television Awards (2000): IFTA Award Best Craft Achievement - Consolata Boyle (costume design)
- Irish Film and Television Awards (2000): IFTA Award Best Craft Achievement - Jean-François Robin (cinematography)
- Irish Film and Television Awards (2000): IFTA Award Best Feature Film
- Irish Film and Television Awards (2000): IFTA Award Best Screenplay Pat Murphy and Gerard Stembridge
- Karlovy Vary International Film Festival (2000): Crystal Globe - Pat Murphy
