= Time Crashers =

- Genre: Entertainment
- Presented by: Tony Robinson; Cassie Newland
- Country of origin: United Kingdom
- No. of series: 1
- No. of episodes: 6

Production
- Running time: 47 minutes (excluding adverts)
- Production companies: Wall to Wall Media and GroupM Entertainment

Original release
- Network: Channel 4
- Release: 23 August – 27 September 2015

Related
- Time Signs

Time Crashers is a British entertainment television programme co-produced by Wall to Wall Media and GroupM Entertainment for Channel 4. The programme's format sees ten celebrities transported to different historical settings where they experience the life of the 'lower' classes and are set tasks relating to that era. It is presented by Tony Robinson and historian Cassie Newland.

The first series premiered on Channel 4 on 23 August 2015. The series contained six episodes that were broadcast on consecutive Sundays at 8pm for six weeks.

== Production ==
The production of the first series of Time Crashers was announced by Channel 4 in August 2014. It was initially described being a week-long celebrity game show with an ultimate winner crowned at the end of the series. By August 2015, Channel 4 described the programme's genre as "entertainment" and the competitive game show element was dropped. Instead, each episode would feature historical "tasks" for the celebrities to fulfil.

In production, the Channel 4 factual commissioning department worked alongside the entertainment team to make sure the programme was historically accurate.

== Participants ==
The following individuals were the participants in the premier run of the show:

- Keith Allen
- Kirstie Alley
- Fern Britton
- Charlie Condou
- Meg Mathews
- Jermaine Jenas
- Louise Minchin
- Chris Ramsey
- Greg Rutherford
- Zoe Smith

== Episodes ==
Each episode focuses on a different period in British history.

=== Series 1 ===
No.	Title	Original release date
1	"Episode 1"	23 August 2015
In the first episode of the series, the celebrities experience life as servants in an Elizabethan era 1588 country house. The episode was filmed in Haddon Hall, Derbyshire.
2	"Episode 2"	30 August 2015
The celebrities are split into two teams and are assigned to work for two knights as they prepare for a 1468 Jousting tournament.
3	"Episode 3"	6 September 2015
The celebrities become servants in a 1913 country house which is holding a shooting party.
4	"Episode 4"	13 September 2015
The celebrities are transported to a Georgian era 1796 manor house. The women celebrities experience life in the manor house kitchen while the men work on the landowner's farm.
5	"Episode 5"	20 September 2015
The celebrities begin this episode by an estuary in Suffolk where they experience being 1885 Victorian era oystermen and fishwives. The episode sees the celebrities fulfil an order of fish for Billingsgate Fish Market, London.
6	"Episode 6"	27 September 2015
The final episode of the series is set in the Iron Age in 43 AD where the celebrities have two days to prepare a Celtic feast. The celebrities elect Greg Rutherford and Meg Mathews as their tribe leaders.

== Reception ==
The first episode of Time Crashers attracted 1.33 million viewers on the Channel 4 HD and SD channels. The second episode attracted 730,000 viewers, and each subsequent episode attracted fewer than 790,000 viewers.

Julia Raeside of The Guardian positively reviewed the first episode and described it as "simple entertainment perfection". She also praised the casting as "outstanding [...] These are proper people all and quite the mix." Amy Burns of The Independent also gave a positive review of the first episode, calling the programme's format "truly engaging".

Michael Hogan of The Telegraph gave the first episode two out of five stars, saying the programme "wasn’t educational, nor entertaining, and felt stitched together for novelty value".

Time Crashers was featured in Series 6 Episode 1 of the Channel 4 reality show Gogglebox.
