= Dates (TV series) =

British television series

- Genre: Drama
- Written by: Bryan Elsley
- Directed by: John Maybury
- Opening theme: "Chloe" by Hannah Peel
- Country of origin: United Kingdom
- Original language: English
- No. of series: 1
- No. of episodes: 9

Production
- Producer: Bradley Adams; Chris Clough; Harry Enfield
- Production location: London
- Running time: 30 min
- Production company: Balloon Entertainment Ltd.

Original release
- Network: Channel 4
- Release: 10 June – 3 July 2013

Dates is a British television romantic drama series created by Bryan Elsley, who also created Skins, which first aired on Channel 4 on 10 June 2013, at 22:00 (BST), as part of its "Mating Season" programming, illustrating a series of first dates between online dating service users. The show's target audience is "ABC1".

== Plot ==
Set in London, each episode focuses on one date.

== Production ==
Creator Bryan Elsley conceived the idea of Dates between December 2011 and January 2012, stating "a date is a very complex and grown up interaction between two people. It's a complex language that everyone understands. Everyone knows the difficulty of spending an hour or so in someone's company that you haven't met before. It seemed to be that there was an almost infinite range of possibilities that could flow from that. So dramatically it became very attractive". Dates was commissioned and approved by Channel 4 in September 2012.

Dates was filmed in London during the first quarter of 2013.

== Cast ==
- Will Mellor as David
- Oona Chaplin as Mia ("Celeste")
- Sheridan Smith as Jenny
- Neil Maskell as Nick
- Ben Chaplin as Stephen
- Katie McGrath as Kate
- Gemma Chan as Erica
- Montanna Thompson as Ellie
- Greg McHugh as Callum
- Sian Breckin as Heidi
- Andrew Scott as Christian
- Jamie Di Spirito as Jason

Dates features numerous up-and-coming and more established British and Irish actors and actresses.

To promote the series and to provide further background knowledge, Channel 4 has created a series of fake online dating profiles for each of the main characters.

== Episodes ==
No.	Title	Directed by	Written by	Original release date	UK viewers (millions)
1	"Mia and David"	John Maybury	Bryan Elsley	10 June 2013	2.19
Northern lorry driver David arrives at a restaurant to meet Celeste with whom he has arranged a date via the Internet. 'Celeste' arrives but is actually called Mia and proceeds to be offensive to him and the waitress. She eventually drops her guard and finds herself enjoying herself with David whilst he talks about himself. He discloses that he has 4 children, and his wife has died. Mia excuses herself and leaves for the toilet but leaves the restaurant without telling him. Later, David bumps into her as she is hailing a taxi where they kiss before she flees.
2	"Jenny and Nick"	Charles Sturridge	Nancy Harris	11 June 2013	1.62
Jenny, a shy teacher from Rotherham, meets super-confident city trader Nick in a London wine bar. She is nervous and talkative, he is bluff and full of himself though he does confess that his promiscuity wrecked his marriage. Then he takes a phone call from work and leaves the room. He is gone a long time so Jenny follows and discovers him having sex with the waiter in the toilet. She gets her revenge by stealing his wallet.
3	"Mia and Stephen"	John Maybury	Ben Schiffer	12 June 2013	1.38
Mia meets another date, superficially self-assured surgeon Stephen, though she shocks him by telling him that when she was an escort girl, he paid her for sex. Stephen wants to leave but Mia reminds him that they are on a date and as the date progresses, they wind up having sex in an alley before moving on to a pub. He gets a call from his hospital to say that he is needed and takes Mia with him, her unexpected kindness to a dying patient leaving him feeling confused.
4	"Erica and Kate"	Philippa Langdale	Jamie Chan	18 June 2013	1.46
Erica, a closeted lesbian who cannot tell her traditional Chinese family, meets the openly gay Kate in a bar and, although Kate is annoyed to find that Erica has been with men, they go to a hotel for sex. Next morning Kate is scathing when Erica tells her she is afraid to come out to her family, but they still agree to meet for brunch. During the argument Erica takes a call from her brother and as the two women make their next date Erica realises she had never hung up on her brother. The episode ends with her brother telling her that she cannot do what she is doing.
5	"David and Ellie"	Sarah Walker	Laura Hunter	19 June 2013	1.28
On his thirty-fourth birthday David meets Ellie and they go out to dinner. However, Ellie appears to be much younger than she claims to be. Later, when a friend from university comes over to speak to her, she tells David that she is only (nineteen-year-old) student. She is nonetheless very mature for her age and, having heard David talking about Mia, makes contact with her and eventually takes David to her flat, where Mia and David reconcile.
6	"Erica and Callum"	Philippa Langdale	Jamie Brittain	25 June 2013	1.13
Erica meets Callum in a Chinese restaurant. He is a brash, self-opinionated slob who thinks she should fancy him. However, when she tells him that she is gay and only went on the date to please her brother Tony, who wants to 'turn' her straight he is sympathetic and they get drunk together - so drunk in fact that Callum gets out of hand and Erica calls Tony. Tony pays off the restaurant staff to not file any charges against Callum and Callum gets up to leave. Before he goes he urges Erica to stand up for herself. The episode ends with Erica more forcefully telling her brother she is gay and going for a drink with Callum in a happier mood.
7	"Stephen and Mia"	Paul Andrew Williams	Bryan Elsley	26 June 2013	1.03
Stephen arranges to meet Mia for afternoon sex at a hotel but she rings to say she is not coming. He falls in with a conference of local government officers and is mistaken for a speaker from Scotland. While maintaining the pretence he befriends Heidi. Stephen separates Heidi from the group and while flirting with one another she informs Stephen that she is separated from her husband. They embark on a playful swim in the hotel pool which almost turns into sex before Stephen gets a phone call from his hospital. Heidi learns of his ruse and gets up to leave. The episode ends with Stephen being told he is a good kisser and Stephen telling Heidi she looks hot.
8	"Jenny and Christian"	Charles Sturridge	Nancy Harris	2 July 2013	1.00
Jenny goes on another date and appears to hit it off with Christian as they both find the exhibits in the art gallery very pretentious. He is sympathetic as she recalls doomed previous dates and her ex-fiancé's marriage. Although he belongs to a religious group and she is an atheist she finds him wholly charming, and they return to his flat for afternoon sex. Unfortunately, he has omitted to tell Jenny something very important about himself - as she discovers when his wife walks in on them. The episode ends with Christian begging Jenny to let him stay in her apartment overnight. Jenny pushes back and walks away from Christian feeling happier in herself.
9	"Mia and David"	Charles Sturridge	Ben Schiffer	3 July 2013	0.90
Mia is supposed to meet David's kids for the first time, but she arrives late irking David and she discloses she's unprepared to meet his family. David storms off and Mia rings Stephen who surprisingly arrives with his eleven-year-old son. Stephen convinces Mia to stay, and they all play Jenga together. She enjoys herself and when Stephen's son leaves, the couple returns to her apartment where they find a drunken injured David. Stephen fixes David's injury and then departs after kissing Mia. David comes clean to Mia that he has feelings for her, after which she reveals personal stories from her life. The episode ends with David agreeing with Mia that it was too soon to meet his children and to keep the relationship on a fun level.

== Reception ==
Dates has been critically well received thus far. Tom Sutcliffe from The Independent wrote, "the writer who wants to leave an impression behind will always be tugged towards a gratifying finish. Credit due to Bryan Elsley, then, for ending the first of Dates, a series of dramas about modern relationships, with an ambiguity".

Of the first episode, Gerard O'Donovan of The Telegraph wrote, "It was enjoyable, I didn't just want more, I couldn't wait to see how successive episodes would link and weave into a format so unforgivingly dependent on great writing and acting. Suffice to say, in a game of snog, marry or avoid, Dates is definitely a keeper".

Lucy Mangan of The Guardian called the first episode "a little nugget of bliss" and commended the show for its realism and its "beauty" in its screenplay and acting.

Paul Naylor of Express & Star deemed that the execution of the first episode was "classy".

Of the first three episodes, The Scotsman wrote, "Elsley is attempting to say something meaningful about the guises we adopt at our most vulnerable and desperate. It's an unedifying portrait of human nature at somewhere near its worst: a cynical blast of rotten candour. Whether Elsley and his fellow writers actually like their characters is a moot point, but I can't deny the voyeuristic impact of these superbly performed chamber pieces".

Writing for The Spectator, Clarissa Tan said that the show's "smartness gets wearying after a while". She criticised episode four on the basis that a lesbian coming out narrative "is quite thin as plots go, but not as thin as the sheets that she and her new lover Kate are under for most of the show". Tan concluded that the characters are "tropes rather than people", "a congregation of characteristic, a multitude of attitudes".

== International broadcast ==
In Australia, the series premiered on 16 February 2015 on BBC First and was watched by 21,000 viewers.

=== U.S. Ratings ===
The CW aired nine episodes of the show in 2015.

Season 1

Episode	Air date	A18-49 Rating/Share	Viewers (Millions)
Mia and David	9 July 2015	0.2/1	0.69
Jenny and Nick	9 July 2015	0.1/1	0.51
Mia and Steven	16 July 2015	0.1/1	0.54
Erica and Kate	16 July 2015	0.1/0	0.47
David and Ellie	23 July 2015	0.1/0	0.55
Erica and Callum	23 July 2015	0.1/0	0.53
Stephen and Mia	30 July 2015	0.1/1	0.55
Jenny and Christian	30 July 2015	0.2/1	0.55
Mia and David	6 August 2015	0.2/1	0.45

== Spin-offs and adaptations ==
Entertainment One and Bryan Elsley have partnered to release a companion e-book to the television series.

In 2015 Cites, a Catalan-language adaptation was first broadcast by TV3. Like its British predecessor, it follows encounters between couples who meet through an online dating app. However, the 45-minute episodes feature two separate dates, distinguishing it from Dates, which focuses on a single couple per episode. With the exception of three episodes, the scripts in Cites are original. A second season aired in 2016.

In October 2022, Prime Video, in collaboration with TV3, announced a third season under the title Cites Barcelona, which was released in June 2023 with six episodes. Series creator Pau Freixas returned as executive producer and director. A fourth season was confirmed in March 2024.
