= Paul Newsome =

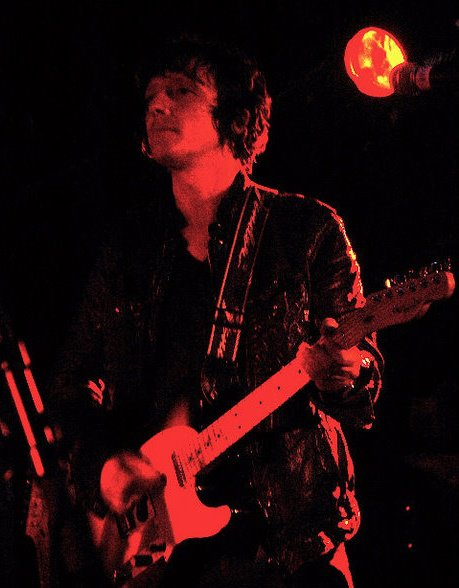
- Paul Newsome on stage in Los Angeles 2010

Background information
- Born: Royton, England
- Genres: Rock, Indie, Singer Songwriter
- Occupation: Musician
- Instruments: Vocals, Guitar, Harmonica
- Years active: 2001–present
- Website: http://www.paulnewsomemusic.com/

Paul Newsome (born 1977) is a gold selling musician originally from Royton, Oldham, England and living in Los Angeles. He is the guitarist/songwriter for UK rock group Proud Mary. He has written several films scores including the movie "Hide Away". "Blackbird" and "Mind Games" starring Robert Evans Paul has recorded and toured extensively with artists including Neil Young, The Who, The Buzzcocks, David Bowie, Stereophonics, The Black Crowes, Ryan Adams, Paul Weller, Ocean Colour Scene, The Happy Mondays and Oasis to name a few (Proud Mary were the first signings to Noel Gallagher's Sour Mash label and Gallagher produced their first album.)

Paul started his career with Manchester band The Ya Ya's who were touring buddies with a then unknown Oasis. They played their first London gigs together and continue their friendship until today. Noel Gallagher described Paul's songs as "a cross between the Stones, Neil Young and the Band. It's a lesson in songwriting." Paul can be seen playing piano in the videos for Noel Gallagher's High Flying Birds single "In the heat of the moment" and "The Ballad of the Mighty I" Paul recently opened up for Noel around Europe and his concert at Düsseldorf Mitsubishi Arena was broadcast in Germany on legendary TV show Rockpalast

== Discography ==
=== Albums and EPs ===
Year	Information	UK Albums Chart Position
2015	Electric and Palms: Debut Solo album	
