= Supernova Heights =

Coordinates: 51.5454°N 0.1595°W

General information
- Type: Semi-detached house
- Architectural style: Victorian
- Location: 9 Steele's Road; London, NW3, UK
- Completed: 1870s

Supernova Heights is a Victorian semi-detached house at 9 Steele's Road in the Belsize Park area of the London Borough of Camden. The semi-detached property is most known for being the home of Oasis singer-songwriter Noel Gallagher in the late 1990s and as a place of 'non-stop party' during that time. The house was named in allusion to Oasis's song "Champagne Supernova".

== History ==
Gallagher bought the house on Steele's Road on 27th September 1996 for £960,000 and lived at the property for two and a half years. He subsequently described it as a "big, fucking heavy house". The home became the constant site of paparazzi photographers during Gallagher's occupancy. Fans of Oasis would regularly congregate outside the residence, and the house became notorious locally for raucous parties.

Gallagher described the home at this time as like a "bad advert for drugs if you went inside it". Gallagher's wife at the time, Meg Mathews, remembered one of the members of the band The Charlatans falling down the house's limestone staircase and breaking his leg. The supermodel Kate Moss lived at the residence for several weeks. Sean Rowley interviewed Gallagher at the house for his BBC Radio programme, "All Back to Mine", which was broadcast on Christmas Day in 1997. Gallagher had soundproofing put in the house, which led his neighbour Bob Hoskins to describe him as the "quietest neighbour in Europe".

In a 2000 interview, Gallagher said that the home had "turned into a nightclub...The bar was always open, the door was always open, there were more people coming in and out than I ever got to know" and recalled "wasted years sitting there with the curtains closed" talking about conspiracy theories. An epiphany at the house in 1997 led to Gallagher's sobriety. Gallagher looked around the living room and realised that "20 to 30 people were there all the time. And none of them were my mates". Gallagher initially stopped drinking alcohol and taking recreational drugs for a week, which then became six weeks, and described himself as becoming "addicted to getting sober". He described the period between 1995 and 1997 as "mental and great. But unsustainable". "Supernova Heights was great for the time but then there came a point when I thought, 'I need to get out of this,'" Gallagher later told the Belfast Telegraph.

The next occupants were David Beckham’s business partner Dave Gardner and Davinia Taylor, an actress and denizen of the Primrose Hill set, in 1999, moving in "on the strength of a drunken early morning conversation", as described by Kate Moss's biographer Laura Collins.

The first change of ownership since the Gallagher purchase in 1996 occurred on 5th August 2005 when it was bought by the comedian and writer David Walliams for £2,975,000. Walliams stated that he planned to take a year to renovate the house and joked that he wanted to call the house 'Superduper Heights'. Walliams restored the facade of the property and created "double-and-triple-storey spaces". He then put the house up for sale in 2018 for £5.35 million, eventually selling the property on 12th April 2019 for £4.9m.
