= Love and Light (Proud Mary album) =

Studio album by Proud Mary
- Released: September 13, 2004
- Genre: Rock
- Label: Sour Mash
- Producer: Jan "Stan" Kybert, Paul Newsome, Wayne Edwards, Proud Mary

Proud Mary chronology
The Same Old Blues (2001)	Love and Light (2004)	Ocean Park (2010)

Love and Light is the second album from UK rock group Proud Mary. The album reached #172 in the UK album charts.

== Track listing ==
1. "Love to Love You"
2. "Hats Off!"
3. "Love and Light"
4. "Mexico"
5. "Rain on Me"
6. "Blues"
7. "Lady of the Country"
8. "Mundane Morning"
9. "She Don't Know"
10. "Never Good Night"
11. "Into Your Arms"
12. "The End"
