= The Dreams We Have as Children – Live at the Royal Albert Hall =

The Dreams We Have as Children

Live album by Noel Gallagher
- Released: 15 March 2009
- Recorded: 27 March 2007
- Genre: Acoustic rock
- Length: 70:19
- Label: Big Brother
- Producer: Alan Branch

Professional ratings
Review scores
Source	Rating
Pitchfork Media	6.2/10

The Dreams We Have as Children – Live at the Royal Albert Hall is a charity live album by singer/guitarist Noel Gallagher in support of Teenage Cancer Trust. Gallagher recorded the album at a charity concert at the Royal Albert Hall in London on 27 March 2007.

Gallagher, best known as guitarist, main songwriter and occasional vocalist of English Britpop band Oasis played a set composing of primarily Oasis songs and was joined by fellow Oasis musician Gem Archer on guitar for the performance. The album's title stems from a lyric in the Oasis song "Fade Away", and Gallagher-penned Oasis songs make up the bulk of the songs recorded on the album. Past collaborator and friend of Gallagher Paul Weller (formerly of The Jam/Style Council) joined Gallagher on stage for two songs during the performance, too.

Five of the songs were released over the course of five days as free downloads on iTunes, followed by a physical CD give-away with The Sunday Times, which contained another eleven recordings from the performance. The album, with the additional five tracks previously released on iTunes, then went on sale digitally in the UK in its entirety the following day. The American iTunes eventually released it on 5 May 2009. The album was ineligible to chart on the Official UK Album Chart due to the absence of a commercially sold physical release.

== Track listing ==
Digital Download Version

All songs written and composed by Noel Gallagher, except where noted.

All tracks are written by Noel Gallagher (except noted).

No.	Title	Writer(s)	Length
1.	"(It's Good) To Be Free"		3:33
2.	"Talk Tonight"		4:31
3.	"Fade Away"		5:06
4.	"Cast No Shadow"		4:42
5.	"Half the World Away"		4:04
6.	"The Importance of Being Idle"		3:35
7.	"The Butterfly Collector"	Paul Weller	4:25
8.	"All You Need Is Love"	Lennon–McCartney	3:26
9.	"Don't Go Away"		4:04
10.	"Listen Up"		4:48
11.	"Sad Song"		4:22
12.	"Wonderwall"		4:48
13.	"Slide Away"		6:15
14.	"There Is a Light That Never Goes Out"	Morrissey/Johnny Marr	4:48
15.	"Don't Look Back in Anger"		5:12
16.	"Married with Children"		3:23
Total length:			70:19

The Sunday Times CD Give-Away
No.	Title	Length
1.	"Fade Away"	5:06
2.	"Listen Up"	4:48
3.	"Half the World Away"	4:04
4.	"The Butterfly Collector (With Paul Weller)" (Paul Weller)	4:25
5.	"All You Need Is Love (With Paul Weller)" (Lennon–McCartney)	3:26
6.	"Don't Go Away"	4:04
7.	"Sad Song"	4:22
8.	"Wonderwall"	4:48
9.	"Slide Away"	6:14
10.	"There Is a Light That Never Goes Out" (Morrissey/Johnny Marr)	4:47
11.	"Married with Children"	3:22
Total length:		49:26

== Musicians ==
- Noel Gallagher – vocals, acoustic guitar
- Gem Archer – electric guitar, keyboard
- Terry Kirkbride – percussion
- Jane Oliver – cello
- Rosie Danvers – cello, strings arrangements
- Emma Owens, Sarah Chapman – viola
- Ellie Stanford, Hayley Pomfrett, Natalia Bonner, Sally Jackson – violin

with

- Paul Weller – acoustic guitar, vocals (Tracks 7 & 8)
- Julian House - cover art
- Gareth Johnson - mixing
- Tommy D. - strings producer
- Alan Branch - recording
- Bruce Johnston - sound technician
