= Book Works =

Book publisher and print studio

Book Works is a London-based publisher of books on contemporary visual arts, and print studio specialising in bookbinding, letterpress printing, boxmaking, and printmaking. Established in 1984, it has "the mission to disseminate visual art practice to as wide and diverse an audience as possible." It is a publicly funded organisation and a registered charity (registered number 1104148), its supporters including Arts Council England and The Henry Moore Foundation.

Artists whose work has been published by Book Works include Tacita Dean, Jeremy Deller, Simon Faithfull, Liam Gillick, Ahmet Ögüt, Cornelia Parker, Martin John Callanan, NaoKo TakaHashi, Sam Taylor-Wood and Mark Titchner.

Book Works regularly participate in book fairs and, since their inception, have set up one-off events that respond to contemporary art and its relationship to publishing. Between February and November 2011, Book Works undertook a series of five touring exhibitions titled 'Again, A Time Machine', which examined the concept of the archive. The exhibitions took place at Eastside Projects, Birmingham (26 February-16 April); Motto Berlin (6 May-2 June); The Showroom, London (14 June-5 July); Spike Island, Bristol (15 September-9 October); and White Columns, New York (22 October-19 November). Artists participating in the exhibition included Jonathan Monk, Slavs and Tatars, Stewart Home, Paul Buck, Pil and Galia Kollectiv, Laure Prouvost, Dora Garcia, and Kenneth Goldsmith.

The Book Works website has been selected for preservation by The British Library as part of the work of the UK Web Archiving Consortium.
