= Anaïs Gallagher =

English model and photographer (born 2000)

- Born: 27 January 2000 (age 26); Marylebone, London, England
- Education: Camberwell College of Arts
- Occupations: Model; photographer; social media influencer
- Parent(s): Noel Gallagher (father); Meg Mathews (mother)
- Relatives: Liam Gallagher (uncle)

Anaïs Gallagher (/əˈneɪ.ɪs/; born 27 January 2000) is an English model, photographer, presenter, editor and Internet personality. The daughter of Oasis musician Noel Gallagher and columnist Meg Mathews, she modelled for Accessorize, Reebok, H&M and Dolce & Gabbana, and presented Friday Download. She also filmed the music video for Inhaler's "My Honest Face" and has written for Teen Vogue and Tatler.

== Early life and education ==
Anaïs Gallagher was born on 27 January 2000 at the Portland Hospital in Marylebone, central London to Oasis musician Noel Gallagher and Meg Mathews and was named after Anaïs Nin. She grew up in Primrose Hill, North London. Her parents divorced when she was a toddler in 2001, but she remained close with both of them. She was kept out of the public eye for most of her childhood. She has two younger paternal half-brothers and is the niece of Liam Gallagher.

Gallagher boarded at Bedales School in Hampshire before switching to a day school in Hampstead. Gallagher, like her father, is dyslexic. She stated in December 2018 that she had been vegetarian since she was nine or ten and in October 2020 that she was teetotal owing to her parents' experiences with drugs. She became interested in photography aged six or seven after being given a disposable camera by her mother and graduated with a degree in photography from the Camberwell College of Arts.

== Career ==
In 2013, Gallagher modelled for People for the Ethical Treatment of Animals, having become involved with the charity after her mother began working for them. She judged a competition for them in 2016 which offered a designer a chance to design a shoe with vegan label Bourgeois Boheme and stated in October 2017 that her modelling career was entirely down to her father. In 2015, she modelled for fashion brand Accessorize under their younger range, Star. In August 2017, Gallagher modelled for Reebok in their Autumn/Winter campaign, which was photographed in Hampstead Heath, and then the following month she modelled for Dolce & Gabbana. In February 2018, Gallagher became the face of H&M's denim line. Later that year, she collaborated with Vauxhall Motors for their film "Twentyfive", celebrating twenty-five years of the Vauxhall Corsa.

In 2014, she began presenting Friday Download. She stated in a November 2016 interview with The Cut that she had soured on TV presenting as she felt she could do it with her eyes closed. In June 2017, she wrote a column for Teen Vogue lamenting that people her age were unable to vote in the 2017 United Kingdom general election. She was hired in May 2018 as fashion editor for Tatler. In 2019, Gallagher filmed the music video for Inhaler's song "My Honest Face". In 2020, after meeting him on a dating site, Gallagher moved into Instagram farmer Julius Roberts' farm for lockdown; she later featured on his 2022 programme A Taste of the Country.

In 2021, she shot several celebrities for a Coca-Cola campaign. On 4 June 2024, Noel Gallagher announced a four-episode docu-series, "The Making of the Council Skies", would be released on YouTube. It focused on the making of Noel Gallagher's High Flying Birds fourth album, Council Skies, coinciding with its first birthday. The series was filmed entirely by Anaïs and released on 25 June. In August 2024, Gallagher attracted press attention for a TikTok post accusing some long-term Oasis fans of ageism and sexism for complaining that they were losing out on tickets to Oasis Live '25 Tour to younger female fans.
