= Natural Nylon =

Former British production company

Natural Nylon was a British film and theatre production company, in operation from 1997 to 2003.

It was officially formed in 1997 by Jude Law, Sadie Frost, Jonny Lee Miller, Ewan McGregor, Sean Pertwee, Damon Bryant, Bradley Adams, and Geoff Deehan, although the history of the group goes back a few years earlier. Natural Nylon was formed with the aim of giving those involved more control over their careers, 'supporting British acting talent, and keeping it in the UK'.

Bryant had quit his job as cameraman in 1991 and, together with his wife, opened a club on Beak Street in London's Soho. He struck up a friendship with TV producer Bradley Adams, whose wife introduced them to Frost, who was going out with Law after meeting him on the set of Shopping. McGregor and Pertwee had also met Law through this film - Pertwee also appeared in it and McGregor read for the part that went to Law. Completing the line-up was Miller, a friend of Law since they met at the National Youth Music Theatre in their late teens. The majority of the group lived in the Primrose Hill area, and were part of the Primrose Hill set.

Natural Nylon was formed in the late 90s, and the first film to be produced by Natural Nylon was David Cronenberg's eXistenZ (1999) which was followed by Nora (2000), XX/XY (2002), Owning Mahowny (2003), To Kill a King (2003), and Sky Captain and the World of Tomorrow (2004). They co-produced an acclaimed adaptation of Dr Faustus at the Young Vic in 2002.

Bryant and McGregor left the company in 2002, and Law resigned as director in January 2003, with the reason given as the taking off of the Hollywood careers of McGregor and Law. As the company was effectively wound down in early 2003, Variety wrote "Natural Nylon never lived up to its Britpack hype. Founded seven years ago amid claims by the actor partners that it would enable them to take greater control over their careers, it only managed to get its name on four films — 'eXistenZ,' 'Nora' and the upcoming 'To Kill a King' and 'Owning Mahowny.'"

== See also ==
- Primrose Hill set
