= Cassie Newland =

British archaeologist, public historian and academic

Dr Cassie Newland
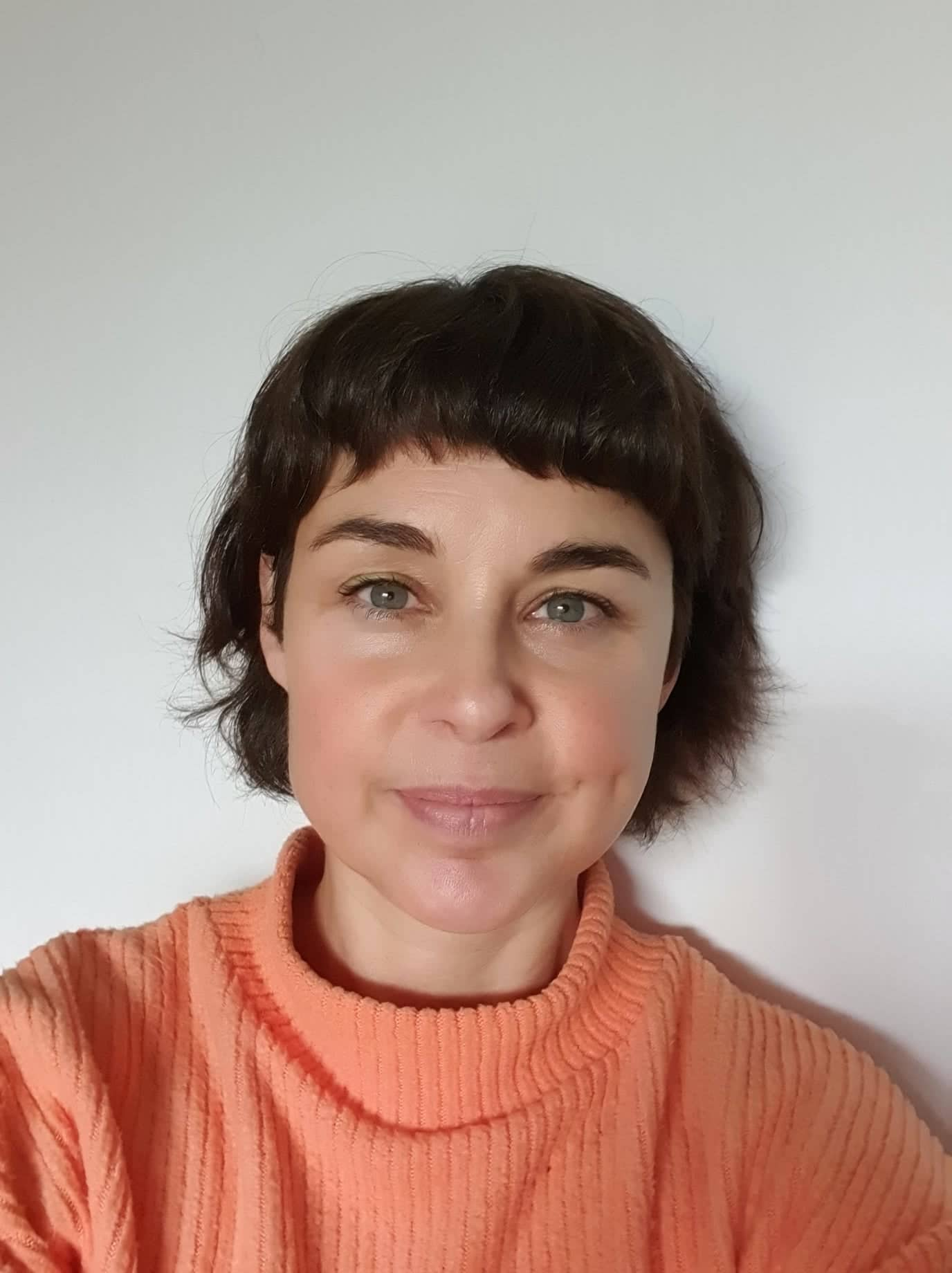
- Occupations: Historian, Public historian, Archaeologist, Academic

Academic background
- Education: University of Bristol (MA) (PhD)

Academic work
- Discipline: Historical Archaeology
- Institutions: Cultural Heritage Institute (RAU)

Cassie Newland is a British archaeologist, public historian and academic. She is Associate Professor in Cultural Heritage and Director of the Cultural Heritage Institute at the Royal Agricultural University (RAU) in Swindon. She was previously Senior Lecturer in Heritage and Public History at Bath Spa University and Research Associate at King's College London. She regularly appears on historical and science broadcast media as a resident expert, including Time Team, Time Crashers, and Coast.

== Education and interests ==
Cassie Newland completed her master's in historical archaeology and PhD in archaeology in at the University of Bristol. Her research specialisms include nineteenth century technological colonialism, slavery and the Atlantic world, and industrial and contemporary archaeology. Her other historical interests include mobile phones, telegraphy, wireless and radar.

In 2016, Newland was curator for the exhibition Victorians Decoded: Art & Telegraphy at the Guildhall Art Gallery, London. It included a manifestation of The Great Automatic Grammatizator, a fictional machine invited by author Roald Dahl.

== Broadcast ==
Newland has been a presenter and contributor on a variety of television and radio programmes. She has received awards for the public presentation of science.

Years	Title	Platform
2006–2013	Time Team	Channel 4
2006–present	Coast	BBC Two
2010	A History of the World	BBC South West
2010–2012	Nick Knowles' Original Features	UKTV
2012	Urban Secrets	Sky Atlantic
2012–2013	Wittgenstein's Jet	BBC Radio 3
2012–2013	New Archaeologies	BBC Radio 3
2013	The Genius of Invention	BBC Two
2013	The Great War Begins	BBC and The Open University
2015	Time Crashers	Channel 4
2017	Impossible Engineering	UKTV, Yesterday
2019	Impossible Railways	UKTV, Yesterday
2020	Ancient Engineering	Sky Atlantic, Discovery
Ongoing	The One Show	BBC One

== Selected works ==
=== Articles ===
- Bailey, G, Newland, C, Nilsson, A and Schofield, J (2009). 'Transit, transition: excavating J641 VUJ.' Cambridge Archaeological Journal, 19 (1). pp. 1–28.
- Schofield, J, Newland, C, Bailey, G and Nilsson, A (2009). 'Sic transit gloria mundi.' British Archaeology, 92. pp. 16–21.

=== Chapters ===
- Newland, C (2020) 'Economic objects.' In: White, C.L, ed. A cultural history of objects: in the age of industry - volume 5. Bloomsbury, London, pp. 57–76.
- Newland, C (2016) Sections on 'Chatterton's Compound', 'Gutta percha', 'Telegraphic Copper', 'The Marine Galvanometer', 'Sir Charles Wheatstone's Notes', '1866: The Year Communication Changed Forever'. In: Arscott, C., & Pettit, C. ed Exhibition catalogue for the exhibition Victorians Decoded: Art and Telegraphy. London: The Courtauld Institute of Art & King’s College London.
- Newland, C (2012) 'Mr Hopgood's Shed: an archaeology of Bishop’s Cannings wireless station’ in Beyond the Dead Horizon: Studies in 20th-Century Conflict Archaeology, Nicholas Saunders (ed.). British Archaeological Reports. Archaeopress, Oxford.
- Newland, C (2009) 'Marconi's first transatlantic wireless transmission.' In: Schofield, J, ed. Defining moments: dramatic archaeologies of the twentieth-century. Archaeopress (BAR), Oxford, pp. 9–18.

=== Excavations ===
- 2009. Turbo Island: an archaeology of Homelessness. Public archaeology project run as drop-in site for students and public alike. Part of a larger English Heritage funded project exploring the archaeology of contemporary homelessness.
- 2006. The Van Project. The now infamous excavation of a 1991 Ford Transit van. Successful experimental exercise into the archaeology of vehicles.
