= Bradley Adams =

British film producer

Bradley Adams is a film and television producer who won with fellow producer Stuart Urban the British Academy Television Award for Best Single Drama for producing the Falkland War television film An Ungentlemanly Act (1992). He is also one of the founders of the Natural Nylon film company and chairman of Union Pictures. In 1997, he received the BAFTA Scotland award for Best Drama Series or Serial for producing the television series The Crow Road (1996). Adams was the executive producer of the television drama series Rockface (2002). In 2013, he produced the romantic drama television series Dates.
