= Proud Mary (band) =

British band

- Origin: Manchester, England
- Genres: Rock, blues
- Years active: 1998 - present
- Labels: City of Angels, Sour Mash, Redemption, Proud Mary Records
- Members: Greg Griffin; Paul Newsome; Nathan Birkett; Tony Auton; Hani Abbasi

Proud Mary are an English blues/rock band formed in 1998 in Manchester, England. The current line up consists of Greg Griffin (lead vocals), Paul Newsome (guitars, vocals), Tony Auton (lead guitar), Nathan Birkett (bass, guitars), and Hani Abbasi (drums). Proud Mary released their fifth studio album Songs from Catalina on 26 June 2020.

Centered around Paul Newsome (Formerly of Manchester Indie band The YA YA'S), and Greg Griffin, Proud Mary were the first signing to Sour Mash Records by label founder Noel Gallagher (Oasis, Noel Gallagher's High Flying Birds) in 2000. Releasing debut album The Same Old Blues to wide critical acclaim in 2001.

The Same Old Blues was recorded at Wheeler End Studios and produced by Noel Gallagher, featuring top 40 singles "All Good Things" and "Very Best Friend", and was predominantly written by Paul Newsome. A gruelling touring schedule followed the release, alongside tour support for among others Oasis, Paul Weller, Stereophonics, The Black Crowes, and Neil Young. The touring line up included Gary Whelan (Happy Mondays) on drums.

Love and Light their second studio album was released in 2004 on Redemption Records, again predominantly written by Paul Newsome, and recorded at Wheeler End with other songs being written by Greg Griffin. Two tours followed the release, alongside supporting Ryan Adams, and a MainStage appearance at The Isle of Wight Festival. The album includes fan favourites "Hats Off", "The Blues" and "Mexico". The album featured Andy Rourke (The Smiths) on bass. Mainly due to the heavy touring schedule and Newsome's relocation to Los Angeles, a hiatus followed. During this period, amid inaccurate rumours the band had broken up, both Greg Griffin and Paul Newsome wrote and released solo albums, Glass Bottom Boat (Griffin) and Electric and Palms (Newsome), with Newsome now living in Los Angeles also writing several film scores and commercials.

In 2010, Proud Mary released Ocean Park, recorded and produced in Los Angeles and showcasing the writing of both Newsome and Griffin, followed by Pilgrim Fields in 2013. Following this release Greg Griffin relocated to San Diego, California and formed the band 'Midnight Clergy' writing and releasing the album One with collaboration from Marc Ford (The Black Crowes).

In 2015, Paul Newsome was announced as the main headline support in Europe for Noel Gallagher's High Flying Birds, following the release of their album Chasing Yesterday. Newsome can be seen playing keyboards in live band performances on the videos for the singles "In The Heat of the Moment" and "Ballad of the Mighty I".

In 2018, Proud Mary released the single, "Hollywood". On 1 May 2020, Proud Mary released the single "Lazy Days and Loaded Nights" from the forthcoming album Songs from Catalina. The album was recorded over a five-month period in the Santa Catalina area of Palma, Majorca and was released on 26 June 2020.

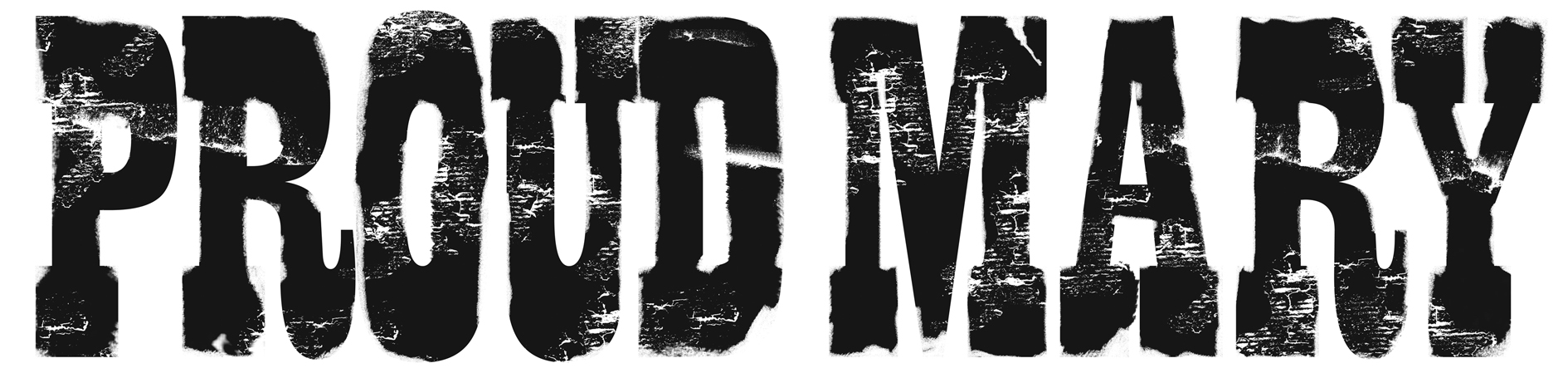
Proud Mary Logo

== Discography ==
=== Albums ===
Year	Information	UK Albums Chart Position
2001	The Same Old Blues: Debut studio album; Formats: CD, Download, Vinyl; Released: 18 June 2001	#94
2004	Love and Light: Second studio album; Formats: CD, Download; Released: 13 September 2004	#172
2010	Ocean Park: Third studio album; Formats: CD, Download; Released: 24 July 2010	–
2013	Pilgrim Fields: Fourth studio album; Formats: CD, Download; Released: 10 March 2013	–
2020	Songs from Catalina: Fifth studio album; Formats: CD, Download, Vinyl; Released: 26 June 2020	–

=== Singles ===
Year	Single	UK Singles Chart Position	Album
2001	"Very Best Friend": Released: 16 April 2001	–	The Same Old Blues
2001	"All Good Things": Released: 28 May 2001	#105	The Same Old Blues
2001	"Very Best Friend" (re-issue): Released: 13 August 2001	#75	The Same Old Blues
2009	Dust and Diamonds: Promotional EP; Released: 27 August 2009	–	Ocean Park
2018	"Hollywood": Released: 1 June 2018	–	Songs from Catalina
2020	"Lazy Days and Loaded Nights": Released: 1 May 2020	–	Songs from Catalina
2020	"Keep It Moving": Released: 9 October 2020	–	Songs from Catalina
2026	"Rabbit Hole and Thunder" / "Come Around Again": Released: 5 May 2026	–	

== Members ==
=== Current ===
- Paul Newsome – Guitar, Vocals
- Greg Griffin – Vocals
- Nathan Birkett – Bass
- Hani Abbasi – Drums
- Tony Auton – Lead Guitar
