= Noel Gallagher =

English musician (born 1967)

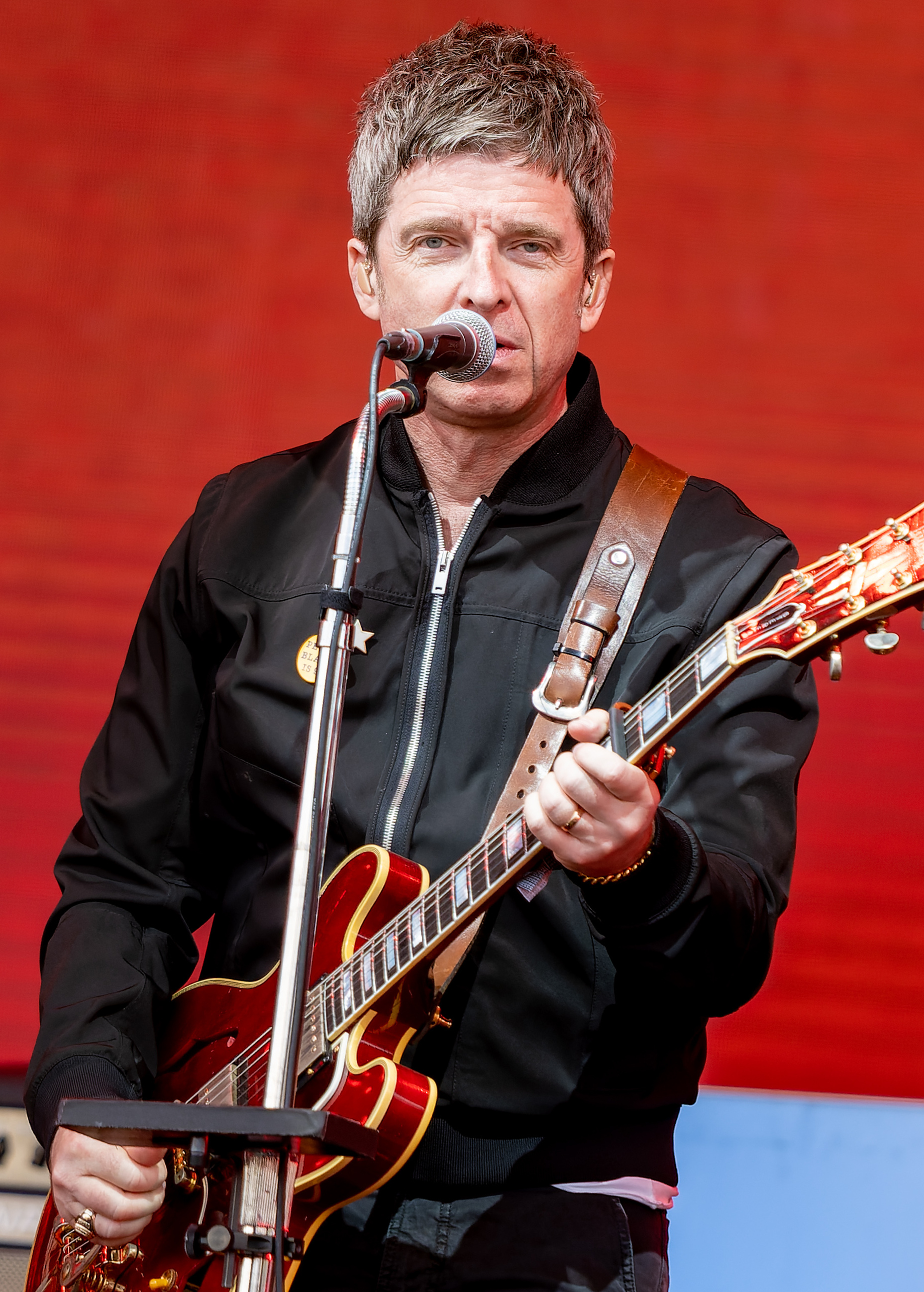
- Gallagher performing at Glastonbury Festival 2022
- Born: Noel Thomas David Gallagher; 29 May 1967 (age 59); Manchester, England
- Citizenship: United Kingdom; Ireland
- Occupations: Musician; singer; songwriter
- Spouses: Meg Mathews (m. 1997; div. 2001) Sara MacDonald (m. 2011; div. 2023)
- Children: 3, including Anaïs
- Relatives: Liam Gallagher (brother)
- Musical career
- Genres: Rock; Britpop; alternative rock; psychedelic rock
- Instruments: Vocals; guitar; bass guitar; keyboards
- Years active: 1991–present
- Labels: Creation; Big Brother; Epic; Sour Mash; Mercury
- Member of: Oasis; Noel Gallagher's High Flying Birds
- Website: noelgallagher.com

Noel Thomas David Gallagher (born 29 May 1967) is an English musician, singer and songwriter. Gallagher is best known as the lead guitarist, primary songwriter, and secondary vocalist of the rock band Oasis. After leaving Oasis, he formed Noel Gallagher's High Flying Birds. Gallagher is one of the most successful songwriters in British music history, with nine UK number-one singles and twelve UK number-one albums (eight with Oasis and four with the High Flying Birds). He became the first artist in UK chart history to reach number one with ten consecutive studio albums. He is widely considered to be one of the most influential songwriters in the history of British rock music, cited by numerous major subsequent artists as an influence.

Gallagher began playing the guitar at the age of twelve, and became a roadie and technician for Inspiral Carpets when he was 21. He learnt that his younger brother Liam had joined a band called the Rain, which Liam subsequently renamed to Oasis; Liam invited him to join the group as manager. After rejecting the offer, Gallagher agreed to join the band, on the condition that he would take creative control of the group and become its sole songwriter and lead guitarist. He became the band's de facto leader and he was the sole credited writer for the band's first three studio albums.

The band's debut album, Definitely Maybe (1994), was a widespread critical and commercial success. Their second album, (What's the Story) Morning Glory? (1995), reached the top of the album charts in many countries, and their third studio album, Be Here Now (1997), became the fastest-selling album in UK chart history. They released the acclaimed B-side compilation album The Masterplan in 1998 before taking a two year break. During this time Britpop eventually declined in popularity, but Oasis continued to have great success having five more UK number one albums (four studio and one compilation album) and four more UK number one singles in the years that followed, and the band's return to form was highlighted by their final two studio albums, Don't Believe the Truth (2005) and Dig Out Your Soul (2008), which were hailed as their best efforts in over a decade. In August 2009, following an altercation with his brother, Gallagher announced his departure from Oasis. He went on to form Noel Gallagher's High Flying Birds, with whom he has released four studio albums.

Oasis's time was marked by turbulence, especially during the peak of Britpop, during which Gallagher was involved in several disputes with Liam. Their conflicts and wild lifestyles regularly made tabloid headlines. The band had a rivalry with fellow Britpop band Blur. Gallagher himself was often regarded as a pioneer and spearhead of the Britpop movement. Many have praised his songwriting, with the Beatles producer George Martin calling him "the finest songwriter of his generation". Gallagher has won many awards during his career, including seven Brit Awards and two Ivor Novello Awards for songwriting, all of which he received while he was in Oasis. Conversely, he was voted the most overrated guitarist of the last millennium in a 1999 poll, which he named as the accolade he most enjoyed receiving, and the ninth-most-overrated ever in a 2002 listener survey.

== Early life ==
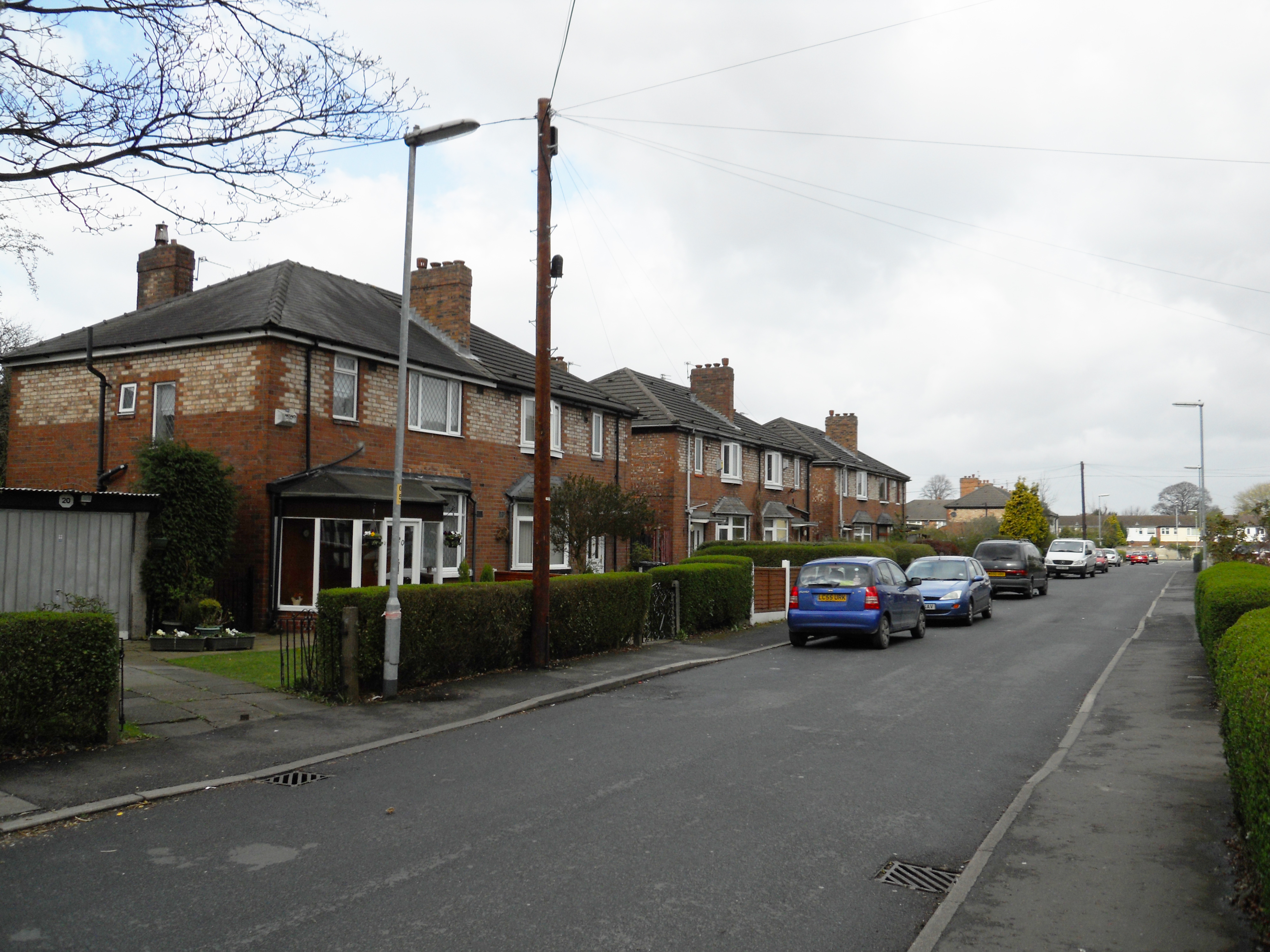
Cranwell Drive in Burnage, where the Gallaghers lived

Noel Thomas David Gallagher was born on 29 May 1967 in the Longsight area of Manchester, to Irish Catholic parents Peggy (née Sweeney) and Thomas Gallagher. Aside from Liam, he also has an older brother named Paul. Shortly after Liam's birth in 1972, the family moved to Ashby Avenue and then Cranwell Drive in the Manchester suburb of Burnage. As the eldest child, Paul was given his own bedroom while Noel had to share his bedroom with Liam.

Described as "the weirdo in the family" by Liam, he was known to be a daydreamer and a loner who was often reclusive due to his unhappy childhood. Both he and Paul were beaten regularly by their alcoholic father. In the documentary Supersonic, Noel quipped that his father "beat the talent into him", and that he had never acknowledged or discussed the abuse with a mental health doctor or in a therapeutic setting. Both he and Paul struggled with stammers which were made worse by their father's abuse and were resolved with weekly sessions in four years of speech therapy.

In 1976, Peggy acquired legal separation from Thomas, and in 1982 she left him, taking her three sons with her and continuing to raise them alone as a single mother. Gallagher said to Peggy that "If you don’t get out of here and leave him, I am going to kill him!" Peggy then responded by saying, "Oh Jesus, you can't be doing time for the likes of him."

As teenagers, the Gallagher brothers were regular truants, often getting into trouble with the police. When his mother took a job in the school canteen, Gallagher ensured that he stopped by to visit her during lunch before skipping the rest of the day. He was expelled from school at the age of 15 for allegedly throwing a flour bomb at a teacher, though he has since said that he did not do it and that he was merely present in the classroom when it happened. He used to hang around with the Manchester City hooligan firms Maine Line Crew, Under-5s, and Young Guvnors in the 1980s, and received six months' probation at the age of 14 for robbing a corner shop. It was during this period of probation, with little else to do, that he first began to teach himself to play guitar, a gift from his mother. He would play his favourite songs from the radio, and was particularly inspired by the debut of the Smiths on Top of the Pops in 1983, performing their single "This Charming Man". He later said that, from that day on, he "wanted to be Johnny Marr". He also appeared (and scored) for Manchester Gaelic football team CLG Oisín at Croke Park in Dublin in 1983.

As teenagers, the Gallagher brothers maintained limited contact with their father and secured jobs in construction, but the relationship between father and sons continued to be tempestuous; Gallagher said, "Because we were always arguing, we'd still be working at nine o'clock every night." Having left his father's building company, he took a job at another building firm sub-contracted to British Gas. He sustained an injury when a heavy cap from a steel gas pipe landed on his right foot. Following a period of recuperation, he was offered a less physically demanding role in the company's storehouse, freeing up time for him to practise the guitar and write songs. He said he had written at least three of the songs on Definitely Maybe in this storehouse, including "Live Forever". He later called the storehouse "The Hit Hut" and claimed the walls were painted gold. Much of the late 1980s found Gallagher unemployed and living in a bedsit, occupying his time by using recreational drugs, writing songs, and playing the guitar.

In May 1988, Gallagher met guitarist Graham Lambert of Inspiral Carpets during a Stone Roses show. The two became acquainted and Gallagher became a regular at Inspiral Carpets shows. When he heard singer Steve Holt was leaving the band, he auditioned to be the new vocalist. He was unsuccessful, but became part of the band's road crew for the next two years. He struck up a friendship with monitor engineer Mark Coyle over their love of the Beatles, and the pair spent soundchecks dissecting the group's songs.

Around the time of his work with the Inspiral Carpets, Gallagher—who had already begun writing his own songs—answered an advert in a local newspaper asking for a collaborator and to record some demos. These recordings (featuring tracks such as "Baj", "What's It Got to Do with You?" and "Womb to Tomb") were Gallagher's first steps into recording his own music.

== Career ==
=== Oasis ===
In 1991, Gallagher returned from an American tour with Inspiral Carpets to find that his brother Liam had become a singer with a local band called the Rain. He attended one of their concerts at Manchester's Boardwalk but was unimpressed by the group's act. After rejecting an offer from Liam to be the band's manager, Gallagher agreed to join the band, on the condition that he would take creative control of the group and become its sole songwriter. According to another source, Noel told Liam and the rest of the group after having heard them play for the first time: "Let me write your songs and I'll take you to superstardom, or else you'll rot here in Manchester". His control over the band in its early years earned him the nickname "The Chief".

In May 1993, the band heard that a record executive from Creation Records would be scouting for talent at King Tut's in Glasgow. Together, they found the money to hire a van and make the six-hour journey. When they arrived, they were refused entry to the club because no one notified the venue that Oasis had been added to the bill. The band eventually secured the opening slot and played a four-song set that impressed Creation founder Alan McGee.

McGee then took the Live Demonstration tape to Sony America and invited Oasis to meet with him a week later in London, at which point they were signed to a six-album contract. Gallagher has since claimed that he only had six songs written at the time, and has put his success in the interview down to "bullshitting". McGee believes that when they met, Gallagher had fifty or so songs written, and merely lied about how prolific he had been following the contract. Richard Ashcroft was so impressed with Oasis during the time that he invited them to tour with his band the Verve as an opening act.

Gallagher said he wrote Oasis' first single, "Supersonic", in "the time it takes to play the song". "Supersonic" was released in early 1994 and peaked at No. 31 on the official UK charts. The single was later followed by Oasis' debut album Definitely Maybe, which was released in August 1994 and was a critical and commercial success. It became the fastest-selling debut album in British history at the time and entered the UK charts at number one. Despite their rapidly growing popularity, Gallagher briefly left Oasis in 1994 during their first American tour. The conditions were poor, and he felt the American audience—still preoccupied with grunge and metal—did not understand the band. Gallagher stated that his early songs, especially "Live Forever", were written to refute grunge's pessimism. Tensions mounted between him and Liam, culminating in a fight after a disastrous gig in Los Angeles. Having effectively decided to quit the music industry, he flew to San Francisco without telling the band, management or the crew. It was during this time that Gallagher wrote "Talk Tonight" as a "thank you" for the girl he stayed with, who "talked him from off the ledge". He was tracked down by Creation's Tim Abbot, and during a trip by the pair to Las Vegas, Gallagher decided to continue with the band. He reconciled with his brother and the tour resumed in Minneapolis.

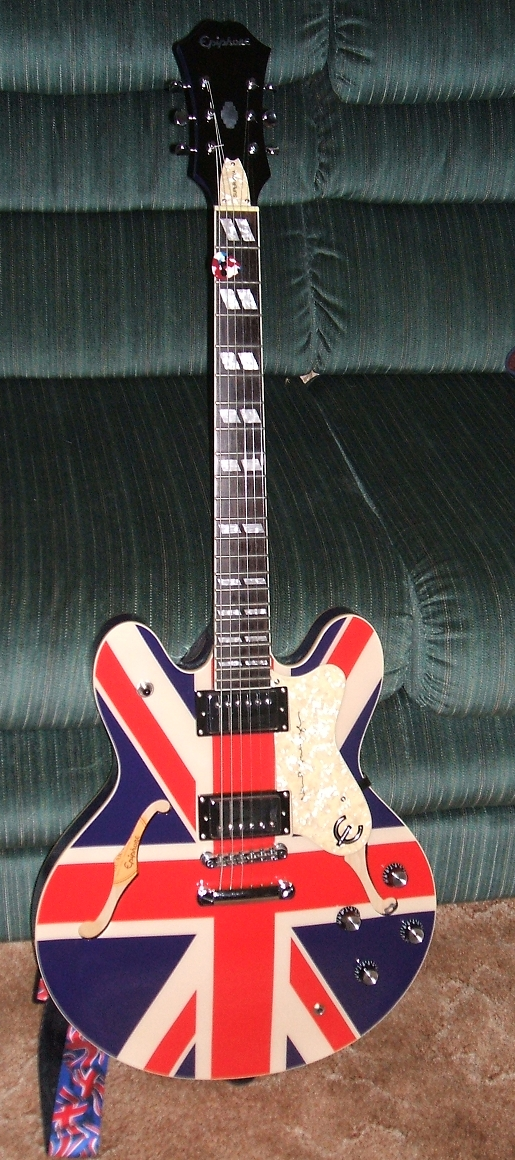
Gallagher first played a customised Sheraton guitar with Union Jack paintwork—commercially sold as Supernova—in late 1995 during the (What's the Story) Morning Glory? Tour.

Gallagher followed up the debut in 1995 with Oasis' first UK number-one single in "Some Might Say". This preceded their second album, (What's the Story) Morning Glory?, released later that year. Though it suffered initial critical apathy, the album became the second fastest-selling album ever in the UK, entering the UK album charts at number one and peaking at number four on the US Billboard 200 chart.

The success of Oasis and his newfound fame and fortune were not lost on Gallagher, and both he and his brother became famous for their "rock and roll lifestyle". They drank heavily, abused drugs, fought fans, critics, peers, and each other, and made celebrity friends such as Ian Brown, Paul Weller, Mani, Mick Jagger, Craig Cash, Kate Moss and Johnny Depp. Gallagher spent extravagantly, buying various cars and a swimming pool despite the fact he can neither drive nor swim. He named his house in Belsize Park in London Supernova Heights (after the song "Champagne Supernova"), and his two cats "Benson" and "Hedges" after his favourite brand of cigarettes.

Oasis went on to have greater success with their next two singles, "Wonderwall" and "Don't Look Back in Anger", charting at number two and number one, respectively, the former becoming their sole top 10 hit in the US. Originally, Noel had wanted to take lead vocals on "Wonderwall", but Liam insisted on singing it. As compensation, Noel decided he would sing lead vocals on "Don't Look Back in Anger". 1995 also saw Gallagher play two songs for the charity album Help!: "Fade Away", accompanied by friend and Oasis fan Johnny Depp and Depp's then-girlfriend Kate Moss; and the Beatles' 1969 hit "Come Together", along with Paul Weller, Paul McCartney and others in a supergroup called Smokin' Mojo Filters. He began collaborating with the Chemical Brothers, Ian Brown, the Stands, the Prodigy and Weller, amongst others. Gallagher became so influential that a June 1996 NME article argued that "if Noel Gallagher, the most successful songwriter of his generation, champions a group, then said group are guaranteed more mainstream kudos and, quite possibly, more sales. And since Noel has taken to championing only five or six groups, then it's a powerful cabal he's promoting." The NME article grouped the bands Gallagher praised, including the Boo Radleys, Ocean Colour Scene, and Cast, under the banner of "Noelrock". John Harris typified these bands, and Gallagher, of "sharing a dewy-eyed love of the 1960s, a spurning of much beyond rock's most basic ingredients, and a belief in the supremacy of 'real music'".

In March 1996, Gallagher and his brother Liam met their father again when the News of the World paid him to go to their hotel during a tour. He left for his room, later commenting "as far as I'm concerned, I haven't got a father. He's not a father to me, y'know? I don't respect him in any way whatsoever". In August 1996, Oasis sold out two nights at Knebworth, playing to over 250,000 fans. Following the worldwide success of Morning Glory?, Be Here Now (1997) became Oasis' most eagerly anticipated album to date. As with the previous two albums, all the tracks were written by Gallagher. After an initial blaze of publicity, positive critical reviews, and commercial success, the album failed to live up to long-term expectations, and public goodwill towards Be Here Now was short-lived. The album was ultimately regarded by many as a bloated, over-indulgent version of Oasis, which Gallagher has since blamed on the drug-addicted state and indifference of the band at the time. While the album was a recordbreaker, selling 813,000 copies in seven days, Gallagher has been critical of the album's popularity, saying: "Just because you sell lots of records, it doesn't mean to say you're any good. Look at Phil Collins."

Gallagher began to have drug-induced panic attacks during this period. His depression and paranoia inspired the song "Gas Panic!", subsequently included on the 2000 album Standing on the Shoulder of Giants. He said he stopped using illicit drugs on 5 June 1998. Gallagher stated in 2001, "I liked drugs, I was good at them. But I'd had panic attacks for about a year and I stopped because I wanted to. After you make the decision, it is quite easy." Of the period between 1993 and 1998, Gallagher said, "I can hardly remember a thing." In a 2020 interview Gallagher said that once, during that period, he ended up in a hospital in Detroit for an overdose, and that the doctors did not understand the situation because of their misunderstanding for Gallagher's accent. He told about the experience: "You know, imagine having the psychosis and going to a hospital and having to go through a metal detector and someone asking you what's wrong with you? And they don't understand the words you're saying because of your accent. They're just like, 'Okay, I'm gonna go get someone else. Hang on a minute'".

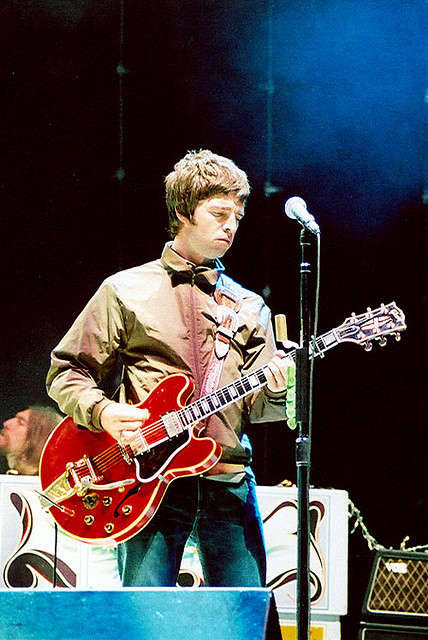
Gallagher performing with Oasis on 18 September 2005

After the hype surrounding the release of Be Here Now had started to wane, critical response to the band became calmer and more considered, leading to a media backlash. In 1997, Gallagher was criticised for attending a high-profile and well-publicised media party at 10 Downing Street, hosted by the new Prime Minister, Tony Blair, along with other celebrities and industry figures who had supported New Labour in the run-up to that year's general election. Liam and Blur's Damon Albarn declined their invitations, with Albarn commenting "Enjoy the schmooze, comrade". The perception of Gallagher as someone now mixing with politicians and a famous photograph of him sipping champagne with Blair conflicted with the "working class hero" status championed through songs such as "Up in the Sky". Gallagher was also banned from visiting China in 1997 after his solo performance at the Tibetan Freedom Concert.

In 1999, rhythm guitarist Paul "Bonehead" Arthurs quit the band, with bassist Paul McGuigan following soon afterwards. As a result, the fourth studio album, Standing on the Shoulder of Giants, was recorded by just the Gallaghers and drummer Alan White, with Noel playing all guitar parts. He later commented on Bonehead's departure, "It's hardly Paul McCartney leaving the Beatles, is it?". After the recording sessions were completed, Gallagher selected Gem Archer to join in place of Bonehead.

Later that year Alan McGee decided to leave Creation and sold the rest of his 51% stake in the label to Sony. Gallagher took this opportunity to set up Big Brother Recordings, which took over Oasis' distribution in the UK, but Sony imprint Epic Records continued to handle the band's international distribution. Around the time of the album's release, Andy Bell, formerly of Ride, joined the band as bassist. In 2001, Gallagher formed his label, Sour Mash Records, which released records by the likes of Shack and Proud Mary. The incorporation of the label followed Gallagher's debut as a producer, working with Proud Mary on their debut, The Same Old Blues. In 2003, Gallagher received a songwriting credit on the Girls Aloud single "Life Got Cold" due to the song's guitar riff being similar to "Wonderwall".

In late 2006, Gallagher toured the UK, Europe, Japan, America and Australia in a series of acclaimed intimate semi-acoustic gigs accompanied by Gem Archer and Terry Kirkbride on percussion. The show proved successful and a further series of sets took place in 2007. March 2007 saw Gallagher perform in Moscow—the first time an Oasis member has performed in Russia. Gallagher dismissed claims that he was planning to embark on a solo career. In early 2007, Gallagher joined the rest of Oasis to collect the "Outstanding Contribution to Music" Award at the Brit Awards 2007.

Gallagher, along with the band recorded their seventh studio album between 2007 and the next year at Abbey Road Studios and in Los Angeles. At the end of the summer of 2008 the band began a tour that lasted 12 months. In March 2009, The Times in conjunction with iTunes released a selection of live recordings by Noel Gallagher taken from his semi-acoustic performance at the Royal Albert Hall on 27 March 2007 in aid of Teenage Cancer Trust. The Dreams We Have as Children features classic and rare tracks from the Oasis canon along with several cover versions of some of Gallagher's favourite artists.

On 28 August 2009, Gallagher quit Oasis after a fight with his brother, Liam. Shortly before midnight, Gallagher posted a statement on his message board called "Tales from the Middle of Nowhere" on the band's website announcing his departure.

The band announced a 2025 reunion world tour in August 2024.

=== Solo career and High Flying Birds ===
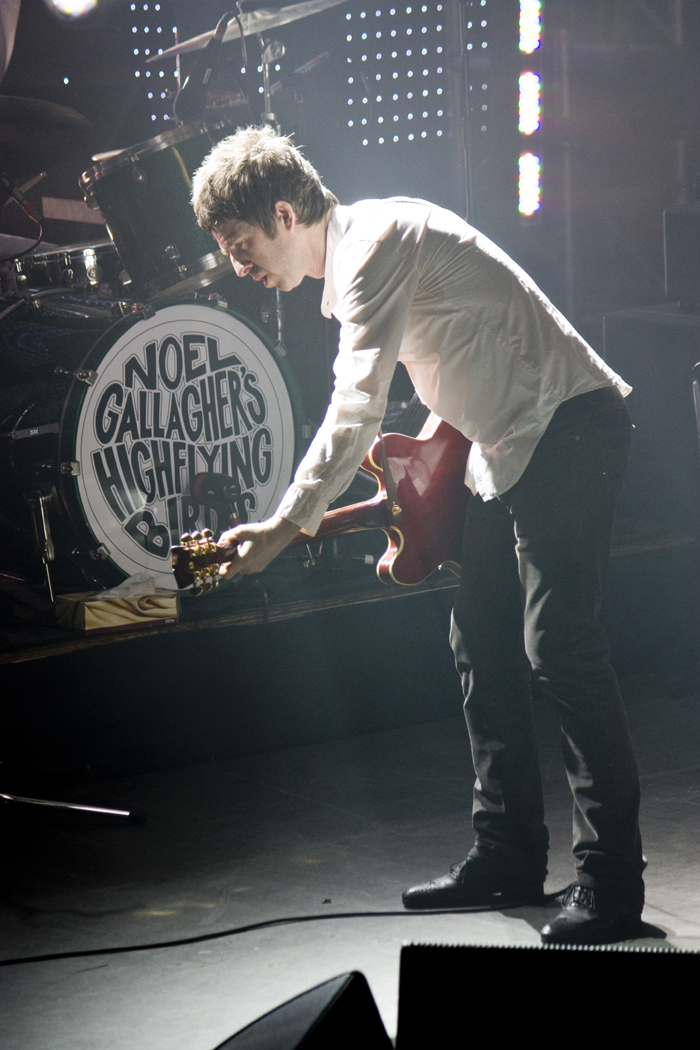
Noel Gallagher's High Flying Birds performing March 2012

Gallagher's first concerts without Oasis were announced on 1 February 2010 to be at London's Royal Albert Hall on 25 and 26 March 2010 for Teenage Cancer Trust. He was supported by the Courteeners and Plan B, respectively. Terry Kirkbride and Gem Archer joined him on-stage, as did Jay Darlington, all of whom Gallagher had previously worked with while he was still a member of Oasis. He played a mostly acoustic set, and played a variety of Oasis album tracks and B-sides. It was almost the same set he played at the Royal Albert Hall in 2007. Gallagher also joined his friend Paul Weller onstage in London on 21 April 2010, playing the Oasis song "Mucky Fingers" and a song he co-wrote with Weller, "Echoes Round the Sun".

Gallagher confirmed that he would be returning to the studio in August 2010 to record drums for an unnamed artist, later confirmed to be Weller. He also denied rumours that he would be the Best Man for Russell Brand's marriage to Katy Perry. In August, it was mentioned on a UK Music blog, Sourmash Music, that Gallagher had been working with Liverpool group the Sand Band. Lead singer David McDonnell has been co-writing with Gallagher and are looking to collaborate on future solo projects together.

On 24 November 2010, Miles Kane revealed that Gallagher sang on a track from his debut solo album titled My Fantasy. Kane also revealed that he will appear on Gallagher's forthcoming album, playing guitar.

On 10 February 2011, Gallagher stated he had "not even started" his first solo record, despite Liam rumouring that he 'swiped' material from the Dig Out Your Soul sessions. "I am not recording new stuff, not just yet," he said to Talksport. "It'll be out when it's finished I guess. Well I've not even started it, so I don't know."

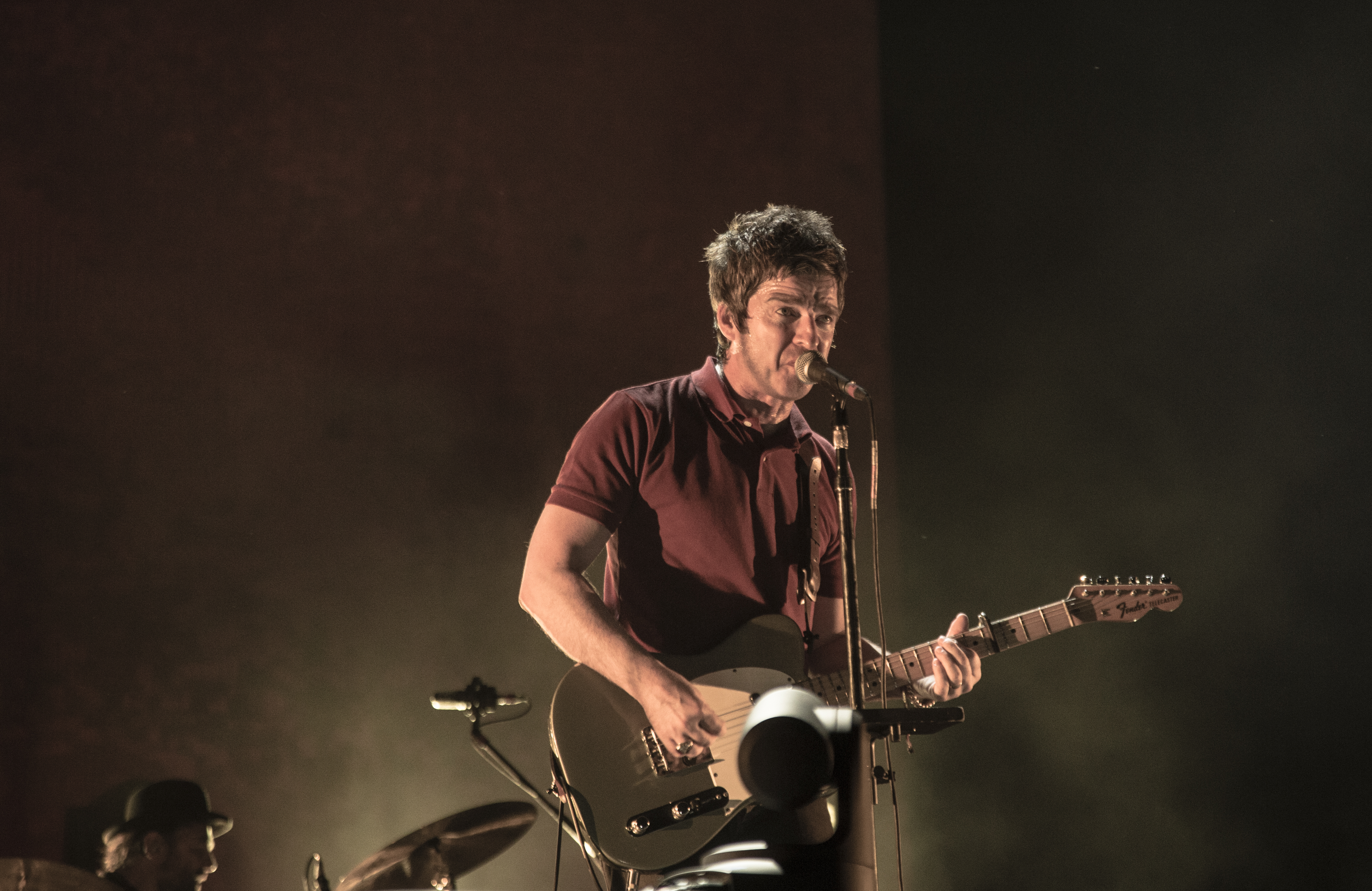
Noel Gallagher during FIB 2015

Noel Gallagher's High Flying Birds released a self-titled album on 17 October 2011; a collaboration album with Amorphous Androgynous was to be released in 2012 but has now been shelved indefinitely. He began touring in Dublin on 23 October 2011. The touring band announced for Noel Gallagher's High Flying Birds comprised David McDonnell (guitar), Russell Pritchard (bass), Mikey Rowe (keyboards) and Jeremy Stacey (drums); McDonnell left during rehearsals and was replaced before the tour with Tim Smith who had played with Rowe and Stacey previously in Sheryl Crow's band. On 20 July 2011, Gallagher released a 47-second trailer of his first single "The Death of You and Me". The video for the debut single was released on 25 July at 8:21 am (GMT).

Following the self-titled debut, Noel Gallagher's High Flying Birds released their second album Chasing Yesterday 2 March 2015. In 2016 Gallagher co-wrote "Birth of an Accidental Hipster" with Paul Weller for the Monkees. In June 2015, Gallagher confirmed he was working on a third High Flying Birds album, later announced to be titled Who Built the Moon? and released on 27 November 2017. On 9 September 2017, Gallagher along with his band served as the headline act of "We Are Manchester", a benefit concert to mark the reopening of Manchester Arena (following a terrorist attack there in May).

On 2 May 2019, the band released "Black Star Dancing", the title track of their EP, which was released on 14 June 2019. On 5 August 2019, Gallagher's band released the title track "This Is The Place" for a second EP which was released on 27 September 2019. The same month, Gallagher toured the United States with the Smashing Pumpkins. Gallagher appeared on First We Feast's Hot Ones in October 2019. On 14 November 2019, Noel released a new single 'Wandering Star'. The single was released in promotion of his studio EP 'Blue Moon Rising'. The EP also featured reflex and 7" mixes of the title track, released on 6 March 2020.

On 29 April 2021, Gallagher announced the release of the band's first greatest hits album, Back the Way We Came: Vol. 1 (2011–2021). The album is a double release, which along with 16 previously released tracks, features two new songs; "We're On Our Way Now" and "Flying On the Ground", the former of which was released as a single the same day as its announcement. It was released on 11 June 2021. In an interview with Apple Music, Gallagher said that Best of Bee Gees is one of his favourite albums and that it inspired the cover of Back The Way We Came. Seven days after its release, Back the Way We Came became Gallagher's 12th UK No. 1 album.

In January 2023, Gallagher announced that his fourth studio album with the High Flying Birds, Council Skies, would be released on 2 June. The album was previewed with the single "Easy Now", which is accompanied by a video starring Milly Alcock of House of the Dragon fame. The album sees Gallagher pay homage to his formative years and Mancunian roots. He acknowledges that the title Council Skies was inspired from the title of a book by Sheffield artist Pete Mckee.

February 2023 saw the announcement of a North American co-headline tour by the High Flying Birds and Garbage. The 24 date tour began on 2 June in Auburn, WA and ended on 15 July in Boston. An autumn UK arena tour was announced in March 2023, playing venues in Hull, London, Birmingham, Cardiff, Leeds, Glasgow and Liverpool.

=== Other projects ===
Gallagher has participated in numerous radio specials and one-offs. On 10 September 2011, Gallagher alongside Matt Morgan and others, stood in for Dermot. In April 2009, Gallagher, along with Russell Brand, presented a one-off radio show on Talksport. O'Leary on his BBC Radio 2 show. In March 2013, Gallagher, along with Brand, Morgan and Mr Gee, hosted a one-off radio show on XFM in aid of Teenage Cancer Trust. In February 2016, Gallagher and Morgan hosted a one-off show for Absolute Radio. On 29 May 2021, Gallagher stood in for Paul Gambaccini on BBC Radio 2's long running show Pick of the Pops. From 8 to 22 August 2021, Gallagher presented The Radio X Residency with Morgan every Sunday evening throughout on Radio X.

In 2004, Gallagher featured on Ricky Gervais's "Free Love Freeway".

In an interview with NME in 2014 whilst promoting his solo debut album Everyday Robots, Damon Albarn hinted at a collaborative project with Gallagher. Despite the years of animosity during Blur and Oasis' respective heyday, Albarn said: "We're talking. It's not anything to get excited about yet. I mean, he's doing his thing. He's finishing a new record. I've got my record coming out, but the principle of us making music together is something, you know. It would be fair to say, we have discussed it at least once."

In March 2015, Gallagher revealed that he was considering retirement from live shows within the following 10 years. He stated: "It's not fun being on a bus for six weeks in America. It's fine when you're young, but I'm almost 50."

In March 2017, Albarn's animated band Gorillaz released the track "We Got the Power" featuring Gallagher on backing vocals.

Gallagher is among those interviewed for the documentary film If These Walls Could Sing directed by Mary McCartney about the recording studios at Abbey Road.

In January 2024, Gallagher shared plans to record a new, entirely acoustic album, adding that the project was "for the fans". Later that year Gallagher confirmed that he had scrapped the idea.

Gallagher co-wrote three tracks with the Black Keys for their April 2024 album Ohio Players, providing backing vocals and guitar on all three.

== Personal life ==
=== Relationships ===
Gallagher became engaged to his girlfriend Diane at the age of 18, but they never married and eventually separated. In 1988, he moved out of his family home to live with Louise Jones in India House, central Manchester. He described her as his "soulmate" and wrote "Slide Away" for her. They had an on-off relationship before separating in June 1994, with Gallagher stating: "I don't think I'll ever get over it."

In June 1997, Gallagher married Meg Mathews in Las Vegas. He had met her in 1994 through her roommate, MTV presenter Rebecca de Ruvo, whom he was dating at the time and whom he left for Mathews. Mathews gave birth to a daughter, Anaïs Gallagher, on 27 January 2000. Gallagher and Mathews divorced in January 2001 on the grounds of his adultery with Scottish publicist Sara MacDonald, whom he met at Ibiza nightclub Space in June 2000. After the divorce was finalised, Gallagher said that he had never actually been unfaithful and had only said he had cheated on Mathews to speed up the divorce process.

Gallagher then began a relationship with MacDonald, and wrote "Waiting for the Rapture" about their meeting. They have two sons, one born in September 2007, and the second in 2010. They were married on 18 June 2011 in a private ceremony at the Lime Wood Hotel in New Forest National Park. His close friend Russell Brand was the best man. They lived in Hampshire. In January 2023, the couple announced that they would be divorcing after 11 years of marriage, stating: "When you get to your mid 50s you do come to some kind of crossroads in your life. It's not uncommon for people who have been in long-term relationships to go their separate ways in their 50s."

Gallagher is friends with Richard Ashcroft (to whom he dedicated the Oasis song "Cast No Shadow"), the Chemical Brothers, John Lydon, Steve Jones, Kasabian, Andy Nicholson, Ricky Hatton, Paul McCartney, Jamie Carragher, Chris Martin, Jonny Buckland, Johnny Marr, Damon Albarn, Morrissey, Bono, Paul Weller, Johnny Depp (who played slide guitar on the Oasis song "Fade In-Out"), and Kate Moss (who used to stay with him when she was visiting London), and was friends with Gary Mounfield. Around the time that actor Ewan McGregor found out he had been cast as Obi-Wan Kenobi, Gallagher (his next-door neighbour) challenged him to a battle with toy lightsabers in his garden the morning after a party.

=== Other ===
In a 1996 interview for Q magazine, Noel mentioned being dyslexic and it being a family trait.

In 1998, Gallagher made a cameo appearance as himself in an episode of The Young Person's Guide to Becoming a Rock Star. He is also a regular on the sports radio station Talksport.

In 2001, Gallagher was reported to have an estimated personal fortune of £25 million. In 2009, The Sunday Times Rich List estimated his and Liam's combined personal fortune at £52 million.

Gallagher is a lifelong Manchester City F.C. supporter, admitting he "cried like a baby" when they won the 2011–12 Premier League. He is a friend of the team's former midfielder Joey Barton, as well as Italian striker Alessandro Del Piero, who described Gallagher as Italy's "lucky mascot" during the 2006 FIFA World Cup and appeared in the video for Oasis' "Lord Don't Slow Me Down". Gallagher and Kasabian lead guitarist Sergio Pizzorno took part in drawing teams for the FA Cup third round in 2011. Coincidentally, Pizzorno drew his hometown team Leicester City with Gallagher's Manchester City for the third round tie, in which both teams drew 2–2 and Manchester City proceeded to win 4–2 in the replay. He participated in the unveiling of Umbro-sponsored football kits with captain Vincent Kompany. In the advertising campaign, the two men are pictured wearing the new Manchester City home and away shirts for the 2012–13 season. Formerly, Kompany had introduced Gallagher to 80,000 fans during the Rock Werchter music festival in Belgium. Gallagher also supports Scottish football team Celtic F.C.

The son of Irish immigrants, Gallagher has described himself as Irish, although he considers himself equally British and Irish. After the UK voted to leave the European Union in 2016, Gallagher applied for an Irish passport. In an interview with the Irish Independent in 1994, Gallagher said, "I hope we're not seen as snotty English upstarts. We're really snotty Irish upstarts". Gallagher supports the Irish national football team and has said that he does not consider himself "to be English at all", but he did serve as an official ambassador for England's bid to host the 2018 FIFA World Cup. Gallagher is also a fan of the National Football League, noting in an ESPN interview: "I love the NFL. I don't have a team per se, but I'm into it. NFL comes on late night in the UK when I'm up. I love the colour and energy of it all. There's so many things going on in American football. It took me a while to get it, but I like it a lot."

Gallagher stated in a 2006 radio interview with Russell Brand that he does not believe in "God or an all-guiding force". Despite this, many of his songs have mentioned God (such as "The Hindu Times" and "Little by Little"), and all the tracks he had contributed to Dig Out Your Soul (as well as the other bandmates' songs) have lyrics and references to God and other biblical terms. Dig Out Your Soul has been described by Gallagher as a "religious Armageddon". In 2009, he stated, "See, I don't know what I am. If I was an atheist I'd just write songs about not believing in God—but I don't know what I am." In 2017, he reaffirmed his lack of belief in God in an "Actually Me" segment for GQ.

In 1999, Gallagher bought a home in Ibiza from Mike Oldfield for £2.5 million, but in 2008 Gallagher sold it, reportedly because James Blunt was a neighbour and he could not "stand living there in the knowledge that Blunt is nearby making terrible music".

Gallagher was reportedly asked by Simon Cowell to be a judge on The X Factor after Dannii Minogue, Cheryl Cole, and Cowell himself declined to participate in series 8, but he declined.

In 2012, Gallagher was among the British cultural icons selected by Peter Blake to appear in a new version of his most famous artwork, the Beatles' Sgt. Pepper's Lonely Hearts Club Band album cover, to celebrate the British cultural figures of his life.

== Songwriting and musicianship ==
=== Style and abilities ===
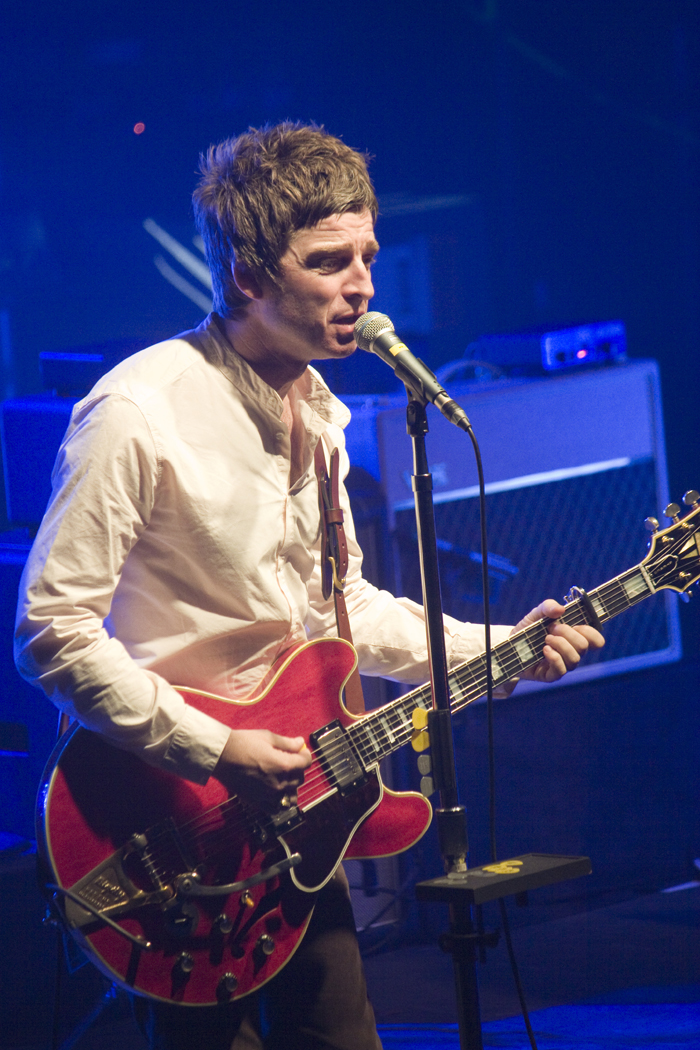
Gallagher performing in Spain in March 2012

Gallagher was the primary songwriter in Oasis, and the sole songwriting contributor on the group's first three albums. He is often criticised for the praise he gives to his own songs, to which he quipped, "If you'd written 'Live Forever', you'd be walking to a different tune the next day too." He has often been accused by critics of plagiarising the music of his heroes, but he has maintained that outright homages in his music are intentional. In a 1996 Guitar World interview, he described himself as "a fan who writes songs" and stated, "I'm not saying, 'I'm the greatest songwriter in the world. Listen to me.' Usually, I'm saying, 'These are the greatest songwriters in the world. And I'm gonna put them all in this song.'" His response to critics on the topic of "blatantly" stealing riffs was, "No, I don't feel guilty. But you feel pissed off because you didn't do it first." He added, "When I'm making a record, I've always been of the notion that if a song sounds like T. Rex, well, fuck it, let's make it sound more like T. Rex! I know there's bands that might write something that sounds like the Smiths, and they'll go, 'Oh, it sounds like the Smiths, we've got to make it sound not like the Smiths.' If I'm writing a song and I say to myself, 'Oh, hey, it sounds like the Kinks,' then I'm going to turn it into a Kinks track."

Gallagher has commented on his musical ability:

I've got a certain style and I've got no control over what I write. I'm not technically proficient enough to attempt all kinds of music. I wish I could write a fucking record like Raw Power or Wish You Were Here, or have the ability of a musical chameleon. But fuck it, I'm not. I just write these songs because they're real to me and they're coming from a place of truth. And that's it. I don't give a shit about being different. I want to be the same. And that in itself makes me different.

Comparing himself to other guitarists, Gallagher stated, "I can barely play like Peter Green, let alone fucking Jeff Beck." He also said, "I'm unfortunate enough that two of my best mates are Johnny Marr and Paul Weller. Those two are virtuosos to me although neither of them would admit it. On the electric guitar they're it. So if you're asking me how do I compare to those two—and I like to compare myself to the greats—I'm average at fucking best." Weller described Gallagher's ability as a guitarist as "rudimentary", saying, "Noel doesn't pretend to be a guitar god. He's very good at putting chords together and he's got a distinctive style in terms of his chord sequences and his rhythm playing. It's recognisable." Gallagher was voted the most overrated guitarist of the last millennium in a 1999 poll, which he named as the accolade he most enjoyed receiving. Though naturally left-handed, Gallagher plays guitar right-handed, which he said is the only thing he can do with his non-dominant hand.

Gallagher has said he sometimes does not understand his own lyrics, commenting in 2005, "When I'm halfway through 'Don't Look Back in Anger' I say to myself, 'I still don't know what these words mean!'" By 2017, he had reflected, "There is a bit of truth in that statement. Like the bit in 'Champagne Supernova' about 'slowly walking down the hall faster than a cannonball'. What does that mean? And the answer is, I don't know what it means. I don't care what it means. It must mean something, though, because I play it to a sea of people every night and they seem to understand it. That's all that matters, I guess." He has stated that he is dyslexic, which slows down the process of his songwriting, and that he can neither read nor write music notation.

=== Changing band dynamic ===
Gallagher's role as a chief songwriter for Oasis changed over time as he allowed a greater level of lyrical input from the other band members. Standing on the Shoulder of Giants included Oasis' first-ever album track written by his brother Liam. Heathen Chemistry included a further three tracks by Liam (including "Songbird"), one by Gem Archer, and one by Andy Bell. The album Don't Believe the Truth featured another three tracks by Liam (one of them, "Love Like a Bomb", co-written with Archer), one from Archer, and two from Bell. The latter two albums have been greeted with increasing critical and commercial success in the UK, particularly Don't Believe the Truth. The second single from Don't Believe the Truth, "The Importance of Being Idle", became the second Oasis track sung by Noel to top the UK charts and was named 2005's finest track by Q magazine, as well as being nominated for the NME's "Best Song of 2005" award. On the final Oasis albums, Noel's increasing role as lead singer, apparently to compensate for his diminished role as songwriter, caused some tension with Liam.

Zak Starkey, son of the Beatles drummer Ringo Starr and previous drummer for the Who and Johnny Marr, replaced long-time drummer Alan White during the recording sessions for Don't Believe the Truth. The loss of White prompted Gallagher to comment in a 2005 interview that he credits Oasis' trouble with drummers, in part, to the fact that he is himself a talented drummer: "I get a lot of stick for it, but I'm the best drummer in the group."

== Feuds ==
Gallagher is known for his controversial and blunt statements in the press, including those about other public figures; he acknowledged his tendency for faux pas in the song "My Big Mouth" on the album Be Here Now. He has defended himself, saying, "People think [I'm] controversial for the answers [I] give to silly questions in interviews, but ... I'm not thinking about insulting people; I say what I genuinely feel is in my heart. My conscience is clean, d'you know what I mean? Y'know, I'm true to myself—fuck everybody else." On-stage at the 1996 Brit Awards, where INXS singer Michael Hutchence presented Oasis' "Best Video" award for Wonderwall, after receiving the award from Hutchence, Gallagher pointed his award to Hutchence and said, "Has-beens should not be presenting awards to gonna-be's." referring to INXS' popularity declining. Those words devastated Hutchence.

=== Damon Albarn and Blur ===
In a 1995 interview with The Observer, he expressed a wish for Damon Albarn and Alex James of rivals Blur to "catch AIDS and die". He quickly apologised for the comment and stated that "AIDS is no laughing matter". This statement was preceded by the success of (What's the Story) Morning Glory?, and a well-documented feud with Blur. The differing styles of the bands, coupled with their prominence within the Britpop movement, led the British media to seize upon the rivalry between the bands. Both groups played along, with the Gallaghers taunting Blur at the 1996 BRIT Awards by singing a rendition of "Parklife" when they collected their "Best British Band" award, with Liam changing the lyrics to "shite-life".

Gallagher maintains that the rivalry was conceived by the magazine NME and members of Blur's entourage as a ploy to raise their respective profiles, and that he has had no respect for either party ever since. Albarn has suggested the roots of the feud were much more personal. Tension between the two had largely cooled by 2007, and Gallagher said in an NME interview, "I've got a lot of respect for Damon, I really do mean it. Because I'm indifferent to Damon he thinks that I think he's a cunt. Our Liam will talk to him, I won't because he's just another singer in a band to me, but I don't think he's a cunt." On 23 March 2013, Gallagher, Albarn, Graham Coxon, and Paul Weller performed the Blur hit "Tender" at the Teenage Cancer Trust. Gallagher and Coxon later provided backing vocals on the song "We Got the Power" on Albarn's Gorillaz album Humanz. In 2019, he confirmed in an interview with Dermot O'Leary on BBC Two that he and Albarn had become friends.

Robbie Williams

When Williams left Take That in 1995, he became friends with Noel's brother Liam and they used to hang together and go to Glastonbury. However, after Oasis sold two nights at Knebworth Park in 1996, only to being beaten by Willams later in that same year with three nights in a row, Williams allegedely sent Noel a pair of tap dancing shoes with a message that said "Dear Mr. N Gallagher, you said two nights at Knebworth is history. Well, I guess three is just greedy. Yours, Rob" "P.S: Finding it difficult to find adequate support for my show. What are you doing on the 1st and 2nd? Oh, and the 3rd? So petty we cant cope" after which Noel publicly said that he remembered Williams only for being the "fat dancer from Take That". When on stage at the 2000 Brit Awards, Williams asked the viewers if the wanted to see him fight with Liam, later, both of them encountered at the Q Awards, and after Oasis won one of them he told Williams that "he better understand the letter Q".

=== Liam Gallagher ===
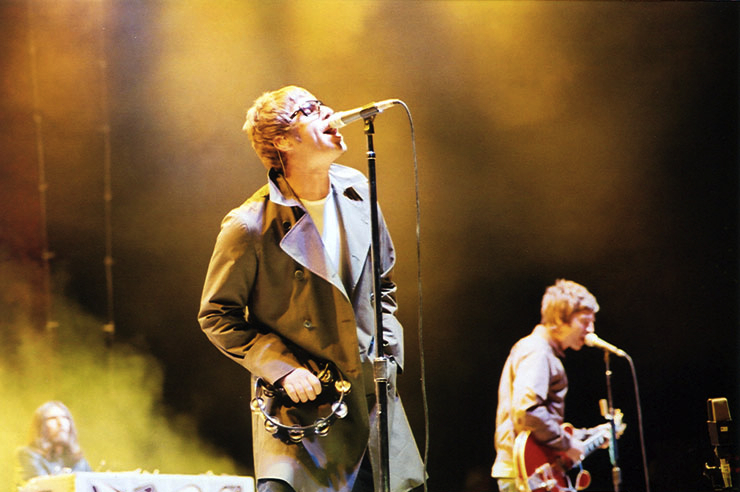
Gallagher (right) performing with his brother in September 2005

During recording sessions for (What's the Story) Morning Glory?, the brothers had a violent fight involving a cricket bat when Liam invited everyone from a local pub into the studio while Noel was trying to work. In 1995, Noel sang "Wonderwall" on Later... with Jools Holland when Liam failed to turn up.

In 1996, Noel provided lead vocals at a performance for MTV Unplugged when Liam backed out minutes before the set was due to start. Liam claimed to have been struck down with a "sore throat", but the band later found out that Liam did not like performing acoustically.

While on tour in Barcelona in 2000, Oasis were forced to cancel a gig when Alan White's arm seized up, and the band spent the evening drinking instead. Liam made a crude remark about Gallagher's then-wife Meg Mathews and attempted to cast doubt over the legitimacy of his daughter Anaïs, causing Noel to headbutt him. Following this, he declared he was quitting overseas touring, but returned for an Oasis gig in Dublin on 8 July 2000. During the performance, the two brothers shook hands at the end of "Acquiesce".

During the final tour in 2009, the only time that they ever directly spoke to each other was when onstage. Noel would later reveal that while they were in Oasis, the two "never hung out together outside of the band, ever".

The relationship between the two brothers again became strained throughout that year, eventually leading to a last-minute cancellation of an Oasis concert scheduled to take place on 28 August in Paris due to an "altercation within the group". Later that evening, Gallagher confirmed he had left Oasis as he "simply could not go on working with Liam a day longer". Through the Oasis website, he said, "It's with some sadness and great relief to tell you that I quit Oasis tonight." On 29 August, he expanded further on his blog: "The level of verbal and violent intimidation towards me, my family, friends and comrades has become intolerable. And the lack of support and understanding from my management and band mates has left me with no other option than to get me cape and seek pastures new."

When asked in 2012 about his brother and an Oasis reunion, Noel said, "I last texted Liam at Christmas after the City match. I don't think it's gonna happen. It would be great for everyone else except me. It'd be mega for the millions and millions and for everybody else it would be brilliant, but I wouldn't be very happy about it. I guess you don't know what you're gonna feel like in 20-odd years but right now, I mean I was in Oasis for nearly 20 years. I've been doing what I'm doing now for one year and I'd like to see what it's like to do it for longer. I don't think anyone is pushing for a reunion either. Nobody ever brings it up in any seriousness; I mean Liam does publicly but he says a lot of things publicly. I wouldn't take anything he says seriously." After their performance of "Wonderwall" at the London Olympics Closing Ceremony, which Noel had originally turned down, he referred to Liam's band Beady Eye as "Stratford's finest Oasis tribute band".

In December 2017, during an interview with an Australian newspaper, Liam claimed that he and Noel had declared a "truce". In February 2018, Liam revealed that the truce did not happen and that it was just "in his head" after "a couple of drinks". In a 2019 interview in Norwegian-Swedish talk show Skavlan, Noel said that Liam was spreading a false rumour online that Oasis would get back together if Noel's wife would let him, and that she was receiving a lot of abuse after the fact. In 2024, the brothers announced that they will reform Oasis for a tour starting the following year. The brothers later both separately confirmed that there is no animosity between them anymore.

=== Jay-Z ===
Gallagher criticised the organisers of the 2008 Glastonbury Festival for scheduling American hip-hop artist Jay-Z as a headliner for the traditionally rock-focused festival: "If it ain't broke don't fix it. If you start to break it then people aren't going to go. I'm sorry, but Jay-Z? No chance. Glastonbury has a tradition of guitar music and even when they throw the odd curveball in on a Sunday night you go, 'Kylie Minogue?' I don't know about it. But I'm not having hip-hop at Glastonbury. It's wrong." Emily Eavis, the organiser of the festival, said she was honoured Jay-Z was headlining the event: "He's absolutely the right act for our festival. There's no reason why we should not have the greatest living hip-hop artist on at Glastonbury." Eavis also reminded Gallagher that the Roots, Cypress Hill, and De La Soul had all previously performed at Glastonbury. Jay-Z said, "We don't play guitars, Noel, but hip-hop has put in its work like any other form of music. This headline show is just a natural progression. ... We have to respect each other's genre of music and move forward."

Jay-Z opened his Glastonbury set with a cover of Oasis' song "Wonderwall". When Gallagher was asked about the incident, he replied:

The way it's played itself out is that I said Jay-Z had no right to play Glastonbury, which is a crock of horseshit. I got off a plane and someone asked me about the fact that Glastonbury hadn't sold out for the first time in years, and if it was because of Jay-Z. From there it grew into this crap that I was standing on an orange crate at Speakers' Corner saying, "Gather round, brothers and sisters. Have you heard what's happening at Glastonbury this year?" I have a certain turn of phrase. So if I say, "Chicken sandwiches in McDonald's are just plain fucking wrong," it doesn't mean I'm attacking all chickens or all sandwiches. I've hung out with Jay-Z in Tokyo. I've seen his show. It's not my bag, but it's all right. We have a mutual friend in Chris Martin. ... I don't dislike rappers or hip-hop or people who like it. I went to the Def Jam tour in Manchester in the '80s when rap was inspirational. Public Enemy were awesome. But it's all about status and bling now, and it doesn't say anything to me.

When Jay-Z was asked about Gallagher's comments, he said, "I haven't spoken to [Gallagher], I heard he was reaching out. I don't bear any grudge, it's all good. I just believe in good music and bad music, I've always said that. You look at any interview from the beginning of time, I've always stated that I don't believe in the lines and classifications that people put music in so they can easily define it." When asked who he would be interested in collaborating with, he said, "Anyone. Oasis as well. It doesn't matter to me."

=== Phil Collins ===
Gallagher has frequently criticised Phil Collins, saying his music is bland and the opposite of what he stands for. He was quoted as saying, "People hate fucking cunts like Phil Collins, and if they don't, they fucking should!" He also called Collins the "Antichrist". Prior to the 2005 UK election, he stated that he was still supporting the Labour government partly because of his concern that "Phil Collins is threatening to come back and live here [if the Conservatives win] and let's face it, none of us want that". Collins responded by saying that Gallagher "loves slagging me off". He also denied that he was a Conservative Party supporter in an interview in The Guardian. He appeared on the BBC television series Room 101 and nominated to banish the Gallagher brothers, describing them as "rude and not as talented as they think they are". In his 2016 autobiography, Not Dead Yet, Collins recalled meeting Gallagher in 1996 at a bar in Mustique. Gallagher declined Collins' request to jam with him.

== Political views ==
Gallagher has spoken about his political views on several occasions. He was quoted: "Politics is like football for me. Labour is my team and even if you don't like a striker you don't give up supporting the whole team. Labour is the lesser of two evils. What else should we have? Anarchy? Someone has to be responsible." In 1997, he visited the recently appointed Prime Minister Tony Blair at 10 Downing Street. In an interview that year, when he was asked about why he visited Blair, he replied:

I've taken a lot of flack for going to No. 10 Downing Street but the thing about that is, I never considered myself a rebel anyway. I wasn't going there representing the 'Indie community'. I wasn't representing anyone. I was going there for me. You have to understand that from when I went to school and from when I was born all we ever knew was Conservative, Tory, right-wing government. What people don't mention is, they say 'He went to meet Tony Blair.' No. I went to meet the Labour prime minister. Our parents always drummed into us that the Labour Party was for the people and the Tory Party was not. I went to meet the Labour prime minister.

Gallagher remained supportive of New Labour despite the Iraq War, but criticised subsequent Labour leaders Ed Miliband and Jeremy Corbyn, describing them as communists.

In 1997, Gallagher played a five-song set at the Tibetan Freedom Concert in New York City. As a result, Oasis were deemed "unsuitable" by the Chinese government, forcing a planned tour of the country in 2009 to be cancelled.

In a 2015 interview with Rolling Stone, Gallagher expressed support for same-sex marriage. He said "If a man wants to marry another man, that’s up to you. If you both want to recognize each other and go through the fuckin’ pain of divorce, fuckin’ good, ’cause the rest of us do, so join the fuckin’ club." He also criticised the religious right in the United States, saying, "You have the religious fuckin' thing in this country and it's fuckin' insane. It's insane. The religious right would go back to stoning doctors in the street who perform abortions. That's fucked up!"

Gallagher said he did not vote in the 2016 EU referendum, but he thought the UK should have remained part of the European Union. In 2017, he criticised remainers who were not accepting the result. In 2023, he described Brexit as a "fucking absolute unmitigated disaster".

During the COVID-19 pandemic in 2020, Gallagher garnered attention for refusing to wear a face covering while shopping. He explained during Matt Morgan's podcast, "I choose not to wear one and if I get the virus it's on me, it's not on anyone else."

In July 2024, in response to political statements made by artists at the Glastonbury Festival, including pro-Palestinian comments from Damon Albarn and Kneecap, Gallagher characterised the festival as "a bit woke now" and "kind of preachy and a bit virtue signalling". He further criticised the trend, stating: "I don't like it in music—little f–king [sic] idiots waving flags around and making political statements and bands taking the stage and saying, 'Hey guys, isn't war terrible, yeah? Let's all boo war. F–k [sic] the Tories man,' and all that."

== Musical equipment ==
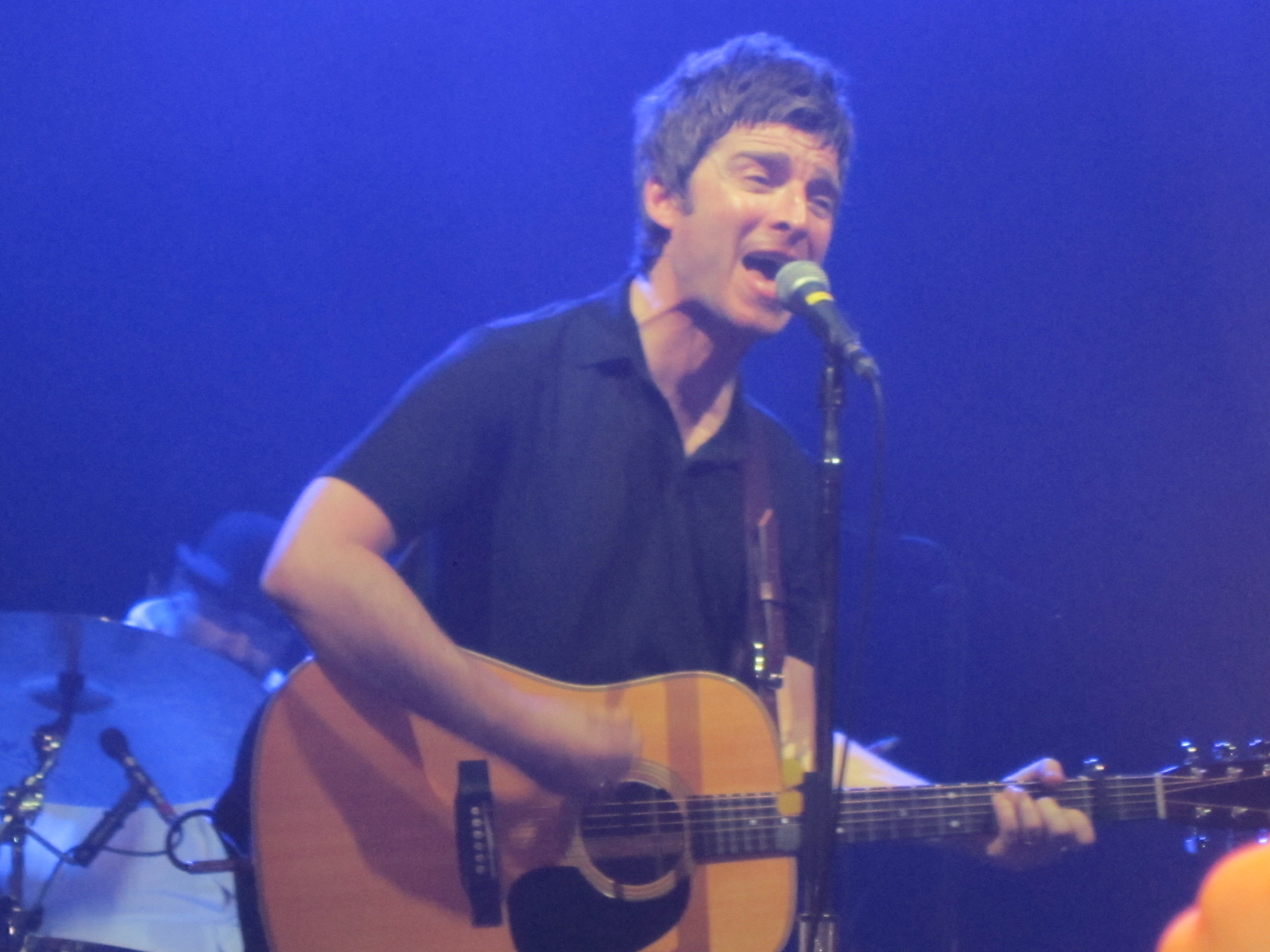
Noel Gallagher playing a Martin acoustic guitar in Rome on 13 March 2012

Throughout his career, Gallagher has used a wide range of different guitars, effect pedals and amplifiers from his large collection. Most of it emerged from the Standing on the Shoulder of Giants sessions, where he decided to drop the equipment used in the three previous albums and instead buy "loads of really weird pedals, old guitars, and small amps", as the lack of a deadline to deliver the album allowed Gallagher to "take quite a few days just messing around".

=== Guitars ===
Electric guitars

- Epiphone Les Paul – Gallagher played a cherry sunburst model in the early years of Oasis.
- Gibson Les Paul – A sunburst Les Paul was given to Gallagher by Johnny Marr, formerly of the Smiths, in the early days of Oasis. He used this guitar to compose "Cigarettes & Alcohol" and "Slide Away". Before Johnny Marr owned it, it belonged to Pete Townshend. When this Les Paul was severely damaged, Marr gave him another Les Paul, used prominently on the Smiths' album The Queen Is Dead.
- Fender Telecaster – Gallagher uses several, one of which, a 1960s model, was given to Noel by Johnny Depp as a birthday present.
- Epiphone Casino
- Gibson ES-355 Vintage Model – Since 2001, this has become Gallagher's main stage guitar.
- Epiphone Sheraton – Gallagher used two Epiphone Sheratons, a sunburst one and one with a Union Jack painted on the front which Epiphone sold as a signature model named 'Supernova'.
- Epiphone Riviera – Gallagher used a dark wine red Riviera throughout 1995.
- Gibson Noel Gallagher Les Paul Standard – Gallagher and Gibson spent 18 months developing this guitar, which was then used on Oasis' Live '25 reunion tour. It has an ebony finish, soapbar P-90 pickups, and SlimTaper neck. Gibson initially released a 25-piece limited run, followed by a full production run.

=== Effect pedals ===
In the early days of Oasis, Gallagher did not use pedals: "I used to just turn up the amps as full as I could get them." Since then, he has begun using a large number of effects, but singled out the Ibanez Tube Screamer.

=== Amplification ===
Gallagher has said that he used only 100-watt Marshalls early in his career. After Definitely Maybe, he began using smaller amps, singling out Fenders (Princeton and Bandmaster), and also a combo made by Clark Amplification, which builds amplifiers based on vintage Fender and Marshall amps. While recording What's the Story Morning Glory?, Gallagher also used Orange and Vox amps. Orange later made Gallagher a custom amplifier, which was later sold online for £6,800.

== Discography ==
=== Solo ===
Live albums

- The Dreams We Have as Children – Live at the Royal Albert Hall (2009)

Other appearances

List of non-single guest appearances, with other performing artists, showing year released and album name
Title	Year	Other artist(s)	Album
"Talk Tonight" (live, with Paul Weller)	1996	Various artists	The White Room Album
"Cast No Shadow" (live)	1997	Various artists	Tibetan Freedom Concert
"Teotihuacan"	1998	Various artists	The X-Files: The Album
"To Be Someone"	1999	Various artists	Fire & Skill: The Songs of the Jam
"Don't Look Back in Anger" (live)	2002	Various artists	The Very Best of MTV Unplugged

=== Other charted songs ===
Year	Single	Peak chart positions	Album
Year	Single	UK	Album
2009	"Don't Look Back in Anger" (Live for Teenage Cancer Trust)	101	The Dreams We; Have as Children: Live at the Royal; Albert Hall
2009	"Talk Tonight" (Live for Teenage Cancer Trust)	119	The Dreams We; Have as Children: Live at the Royal; Albert Hall
2009	"Cast No Shadow" (Live for Teenage Cancer Trust)	120	The Dreams We; Have as Children: Live at the Royal; Albert Hall
2009	"(It's Good) To Be Free" (Live for Teenage Cancer Trust)	121	The Dreams We; Have as Children: Live at the Royal; Albert Hall
2009	"The Importance of Being Idle" (Live for Teenage Cancer Trust)	141	The Dreams We; Have as Children: Live at the Royal; Albert Hall

=== As featured artist ===
Year	Single	Peak chart positions	Album
Year	Single	UK	Album
1995	"Come Together" (The Smokin' Mojo Filters)	19	The Help Album
1996	"Setting Sun" (The Chemical Brothers featuring Noel Gallagher)	1	Dig Your Own Hole
1998	"Temper Temper" (Goldie featuring Noel Gallagher)	13	Saturnz Return
1998	"All I Want to Do Is Rock" (Live Version) (Travis featuring Noel Gallagher)	16	More Than Us E.P.
1999	"Let Forever Be" (The Chemical Brothers featuring Noel Gallagher)	9	Surrender
2004	"Keep What Ya Got" (Ian Brown featuring Noel Gallagher)	18	Solarized
2020	"Not Over Yet" (CamelPhat featuring Noel Gallagher)	–	Dark Matter
2021	"Just One Kiss" (Imelda May and Noel Gallagher featuring Ronnie Wood)	–	11 Past the Hour

=== As session musician ===
- 1995: Stanley Road by Paul Weller, acoustic guitar on "I Walk on Gilded Splinters"
- 1998: Saturnz Return by Goldie, guitar on "Temper Temper"
- 2000: Tailgunner by Tailgunner, drums
- 2001: The Same Old Blues by Proud Mary, production, plus additional vocals, guitars, bass and percussion
- 2002: Illumination by Paul Weller, drums, percussion & bass on "One X One"
- 2003: Polaris by North Mississippi Allstars, vocals on "One To Grow On" & "Polaris"
- 2003: Live at the Royal Albert Hall by the Who, guitar, backing vocals on "Won't Get Fooled Again"
- 2004: Always Outnumbered, Never Outgunned by the Prodigy, bass on "Shoot Down"
- 2004: All Years Leaving by the Stands, guitar on "Some Weekend Night"
- 2008: 22 Dreams by Paul Weller, bass, piano, mellotron and Wurlitzer on "Echoes Round the Sun"
- 2011: Colour of the Trap by Miles Kane, backing vocals on "My Fantasy"
- 2015: A Head Full Of Dreams by Coldplay, guitar on "Up&Up"
- 2017: "We Got the Power" by Gorillaz, additional vocals
- 2018: True Meanings by Paul Weller, pump organ
- 2020: Walls by Louis Tomlinson, writing credits on "Walls"
- 2020: Where's My Family Gone? by Andrew Cushin, production, guitar, bass, keys, backing vocals on "Where's My Family Gone?"
- 2024: Ohio Players by the Black Keys, co-writer and backing vocalist on "On The Game" (also electric guitarist), "Love Only Matters" and "You'll Pay".

=== Other ===
- 2004: "Free Love Freeway" – Ricky Gervais feat. Noel Gallagher; credited as a "special guest" on backing vocals for The Office Christmas Special DVD, on which the video of the recording session featuring Noel and Ricky is available
- 2011: Well ... All Right! – compilation album compiled by Gallagher, released covermount into Mojo magazine

=== Oasis ===
- Definitely Maybe (1994)
- (What's the Story) Morning Glory? (1995)
- Be Here Now (1997)
- Standing on the Shoulder of Giants (2000)
- Heathen Chemistry (2002)
- Don't Believe the Truth (2005)
- Dig Out Your Soul (2008)

=== Noel Gallagher's High Flying Birds ===
- Noel Gallagher's High Flying Birds (2011)
- Chasing Yesterday (2015)
- Who Built the Moon? (2017)
- Council Skies (2023)
